= List of beaches of the Isle of Wight =

This is a list of beaches of the Isle of Wight:

== A ==
- Alum Bay

== B ==
- Bembridge Beach
- Binnel Bay
- Binstead
- Bouldnor
- Brighstone Bay
- Brook Bay

== C ==
- Castle Cove
- Chale Bay
- Colwell Bay
- Compton Bay
- Cowes

== F ==
- Fort Victoria
- Freshwater Bay

== G ==
- Gurnard Bay

== H ==
- Horseshoe Bay

== L ==
- Luccombe Bay

== M ==
- Monks Bay
- Mount Bay

== N ==
- Newtown Bay

== O ==
- Orchard Bay
- Osborne Bay

== P ==
- Palmer's Brook
- Priory Bay
- Puckpool

== R ==
- Reeth Bay
- Ryde Beach

== S ==
- Sandown Bay
- Scratchell's Bay
- Seagrove Bay
- Steel Bay
- St Helen's Duver

== T ==
- Thorness Bay
- Totland Bay

== V ==
- Ventnor Beach

== W ==
- Watcombe Bay
- Watershoot Bay
- Wheelers Bay
- Whitecliff Bay
- Woodside Beach
- Woody Bay

== Y ==
- Yaverland Beach

== See also ==
- List of tourist attractions in the Isle of Wight
