= List of museums on the Isle of Wight =

This list of museums on the Isle of Wight, England contains museums which are defined for this context as institutions (including nonprofit organizations, government entities, and private businesses) that collect and care for objects of cultural, artistic, scientific, or historical interest and make their collections or related exhibits available for public viewing. Also included are non-profit art galleries and university art galleries. Museums that exist only in cyberspace (i.e., virtual museums) are not included.

| Name | Image | Town/City | Region | Type | Summary |
|---|---|---|---|---|---|
| Bembridge Heritage Centre | | Bembridge | East | Local | local history, culture, model railway, restored Operation Pluto pump |
| Bembridge Windmill | | Bembridge | East | Mill | Operated by the National Trust, 18th-century tower windmill |
| Blackgang Chine | | Blackgang | South | Multiple | Amusement park with an exhibit based on the BBC 2 television series Coast about coastal erosion, and a reconstruction of a Victorian water-powered sawmill with displays of country trades and early working engines |
| Brading Roman Villa | | Brading | East | Archaeology | Excavated Roman villa, preserved mosaic floors, coins, pottery, tools |
| Brighstone Village Museum | | Brighstone | South | Local | information, local 19th century village life |
| Calbourne Water Mill | | Calbourne | West | Mill | 17th century working water mill, small period rural activity displays including a kitchen, shed, dairy, laundry, fire station and bakery |
| Carisbrooke Castle | | Carisbrooke | Central | History | Operated by English Heritage, historic motte-and-bailey castle where Charles I was imprisoned, exhibits about the castle, Charles I and local history |
| Classic Boat Museum | | East Cowes | Central | Maritime | History of boat building, sailing, yachting, cruising and racing |
| Conflict, History and Remembrance Museum | | Cowes | Central | Military | also called C.H.A.R.M, military vehicles, hardware, uniforms, weapons |
| Cowes Maritime Museum | | Cowes | Central | Maritime | Model boats, located within Cowes Library |
| Dimbola Lodge | | Freshwater | West | Art | Photography exhibits, home and works of celebrated Victorian photographer Julia Margaret Cameron |
| Dinosaur Expeditions, Conservation and Palaeoart Centre | | Brighstone | South | Natural history | fossils, palaeoart, children's activities |
| Dinosaur Isle | | Sandown | East | Natural history | Fossils and life-sized models of the island's dinosaurs |
| East Cowes Heritage Centre | | East Cowes | Central | Local | local history, operated by the Isle of Wight Society |
| Ferguson Family Museum | | Freshwater | West | Biographical | inventor and engineer Harry Ferguson whose works are found in agriculture, aviation and motor racing, open by appointment |
| Fort Victoria Model Railway | | Yarmouth | West | Railroad | located in Fort Victoria, model railroad layout |
| Isle of Wight Bus & Coach Museum | | Newport | Central | Transportation | Buses and memorabilia |
| Isle of Wight Natural History Centre | | Godshill | Central | Natural history | May not be open, includes shells, minerals, local fossils and dinosaur bones, stuffed birds and animals from Australia, butterflies and other insects, small British mammals, aquarium, crystal replica of Queen Elizabeth II's crown jewels |
| Isle of Wight Postal Museum | | Newport | Central | Philatelic | post boxes and postal equipment |
| Isle of Wight Steam Railway | | Havenstreet | Central | Transportation | Heritage railroad and railway museum |
| Lilliput Antique Doll and Toy Museum | | Brading | East | Toy | dolls, toys, dolls houses, rocking horses, tin plate toys, trains, teddy bears |
| Museum of Island History | | Newport | Central | Local | island history, culture, fossils |
| Needles Battery | | Totland | West | Military | Operated by the National Trust, mid 19th century military battery |
| National Poo Museum | | Mobile | | Zoology | Dedicated to the preservation and display of faeces |
| Newport Roman Villa | | Newport | Central | Archaeology | Reconstructed Roman villa with kitchen, garden, preserved bath suite with hypocaust underfloor heating |
| Newtown Old Town Hall | | Newport | Central | Multiple | Operated by the National Trust, 17th century former town hall, exhibits of local and island political history, changing art and photography exhibits |
| Nunwell House | | Nunwell | East | Historic house | Jacobean house where Charles I spent his last free night, military collections, gardens |
| Osborne House | | East Cowes | Central | Historic house | Operated by English Heritage, former royal residence built for Queen Victoria and designed by Prince Albert, extravagant interiors, gardens, hothouses, Swiss cottage |
| Quay Arts Centre | | Newport | South | Art | Arts centre with exhibit galleries |
| Shipwreck Centre and Maritime Museum | | Arreton | Central | Maritime | diving equipment, artifacts recovered from shipwrecks, lifeboat, smuggling and fishing displays |
| Sir Max Aitken Museum | | Cowes | Central | Maritime | located in an 18th-century sail maker's loft, houses nautical artifacts, marine paintings, models |
| St. Catherine's Lighthouse | | Niton | South | Maritime | 19th century lighthouse open for tours |
| Ventnor Heritage Museum | | Ventnor | South | Local | information, local history, culture, antiques |
| Wight Military and Heritage Museum | | Northwood | Central | Military | tanks, artefacts, other vehicles, small arms and uniforms from the 1940s to the present day |
| Yarmouth Castle | | Yarmouth | West | Military | Operated by English Heritage, one of Henry VIII's Device Forts, exhibits depicting its use in the 16th century and shipwrecks |

== Defunct ==
- Arreton Manor, now closed to the public
- The Brading Experience, also known as the Isle of Wight Waxworks,
- Dinosaur Farm Museum, Brighstone
- Isle of Wight Coastal Visitors Centre, Ventnor
- Sunken Secrets now Shipwreck Centre and Maritime Museum at Arreton

Albany Steam Museum.

== See also ==
- List of beaches of the Isle of Wight
- List of tourist attractions in the Isle of Wight
