= St Lawrence, Isle of Wight =

Coordinates: 50°35′19″N 1°14′23″W

St Lawrence
- Village
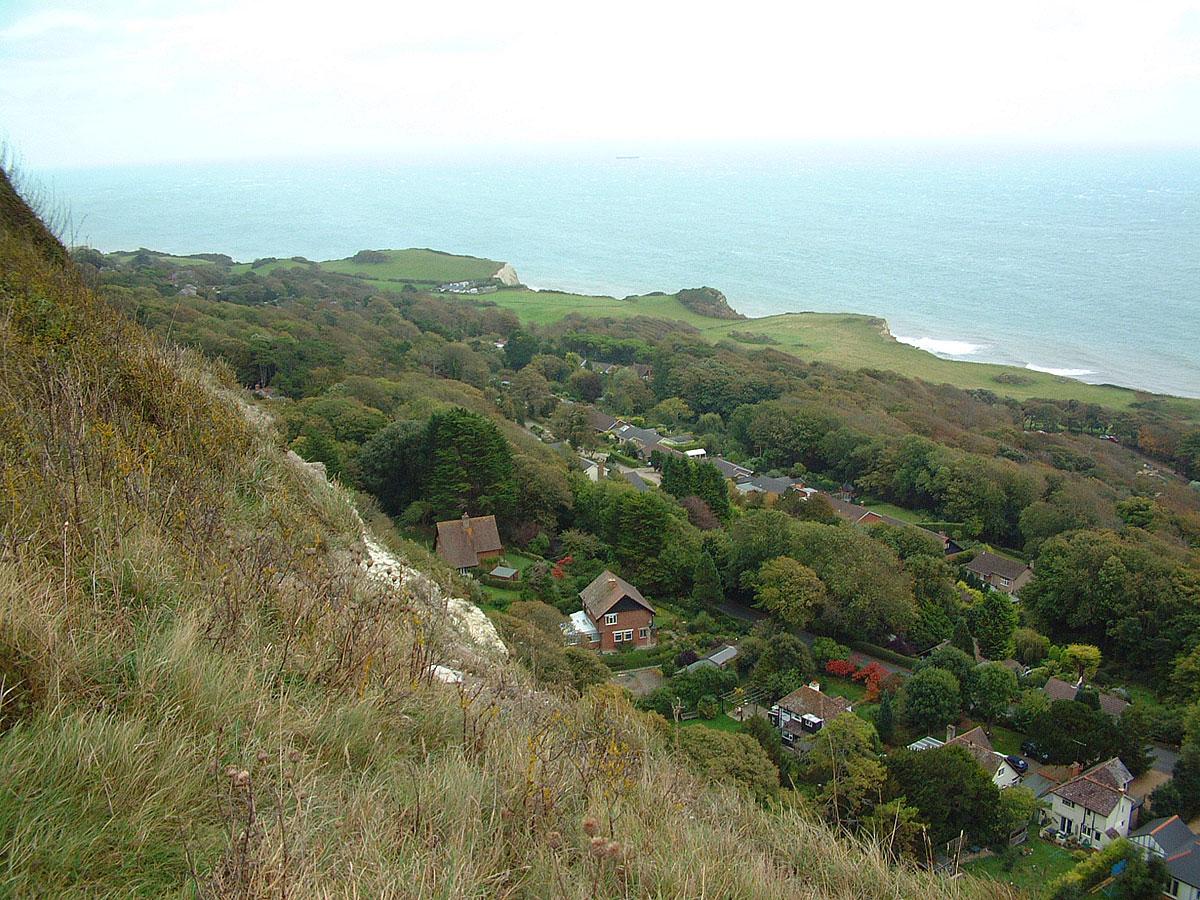
- The Undercliff area of St Lawrence

- Location within the Isle of Wight
- Area: 0.51 sq mi (1.3 km^{2})
- OS grid reference: SZ562775
- Civil parish: Ventnor
- Unitary authority: Isle of Wight
- Ceremonial county: Isle of Wight
- Region: South East
- Country: England
- Sovereign state: United Kingdom
- Post town: VENTNOR
- Postcode district: PO38
- Dialling code: 01983
- Police: Hampshire and Isle of Wight
- Fire: Hampshire and Isle of Wight
- Ambulance: Isle of Wight
- UK Parliament: Isle of Wight East

St Lawrence is a village and former civil parish, now in the parish of Ventnor, on the south (English Channel) coast of the Isle of Wight, in southern England. It is located to the west of the town of Ventnor, in the Undercliff, which is subject to landslips. The Undercliff lies between the original high cliff and the sea, formed over thousands of years, since the last Ice Age, from accumulated landslips. Several rocky coves can be accessed from the coastal path, which affords fine views of some prominent Victorian villas, set in a wooded landscape below the great rock wall of the original sea cliff: Woody Bay, Mount Bay and Orchard Bay. The area of the parish was around 329 acres (133 ha) in size. In 1931 the parish had a population of 329. On 1 April 1933 the parish was abolished and merged with Ventnor.

== History ==
St. Lawrence is much older than Ventnor dating back to at least the Middle Ages. The Old Church of St. Lawrence dates from the 12th century. When first built it was only 20 feet long and 12 feet wide, considered at the time to be the smallest church in England. In 1842 it was lengthened by the addition of a ten-foot chancel. Although there are undoubtedly smaller chapels including the tiny church at Les Vauxbelets on Guernsey, this arguably remains the smallest to be built as a parish church — although this role has long since been supplanted by a larger, Victorian church in the village.

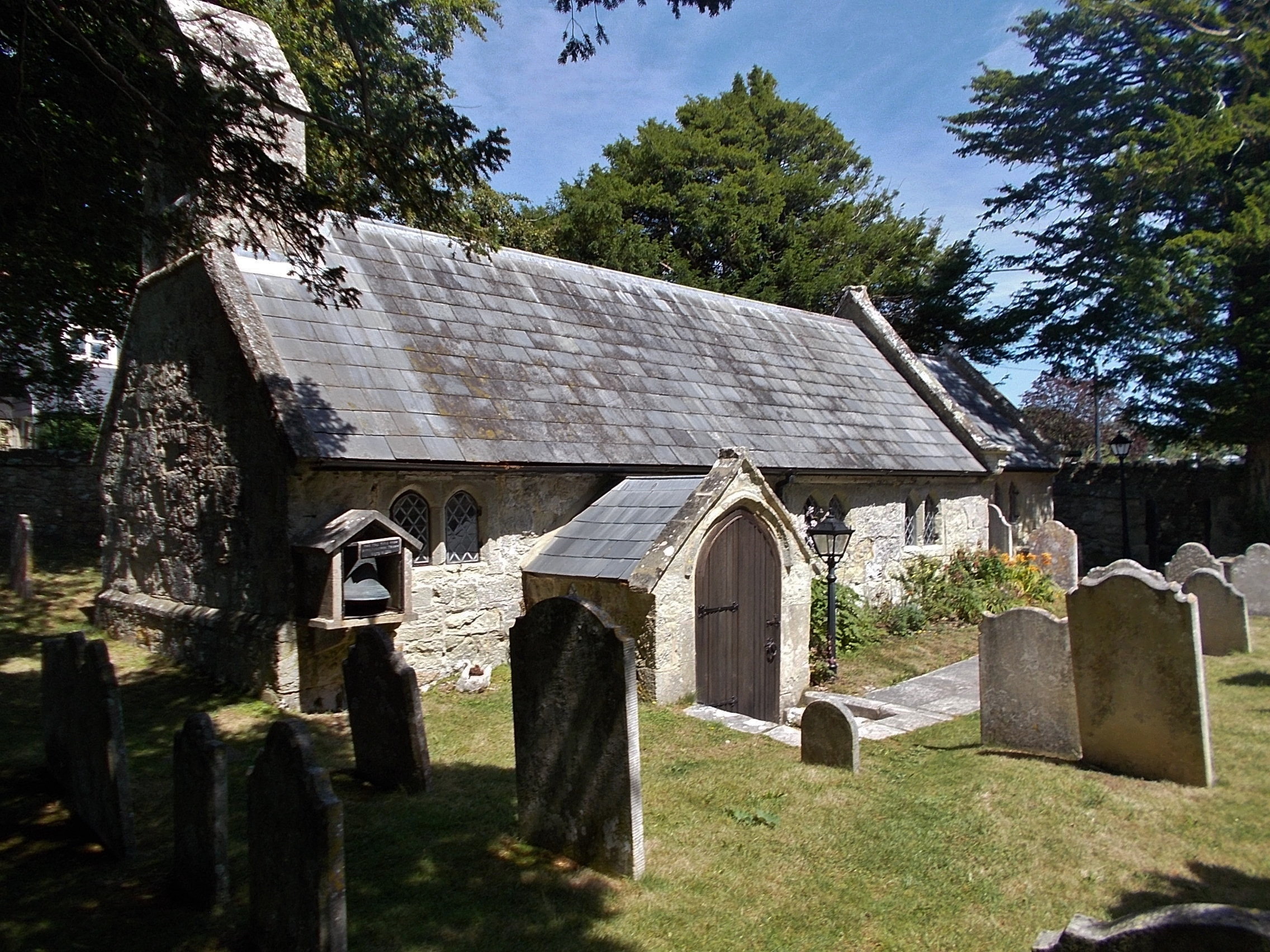
St Lawrence Old Church.

The old church has a 15th-century baptismal font - a stoup that is about 500 years old and a series of 18th-century hat pegs. The piscina niche is almost the same age as the church. The church was refurbished in 1926–7. A larger church, St Lawrence's Church, St Lawrence, is situated 200 yards (180 m) away from the Old Church dates from the 19th century. It also has a 17th-century altar and a chest that dates from 1612.

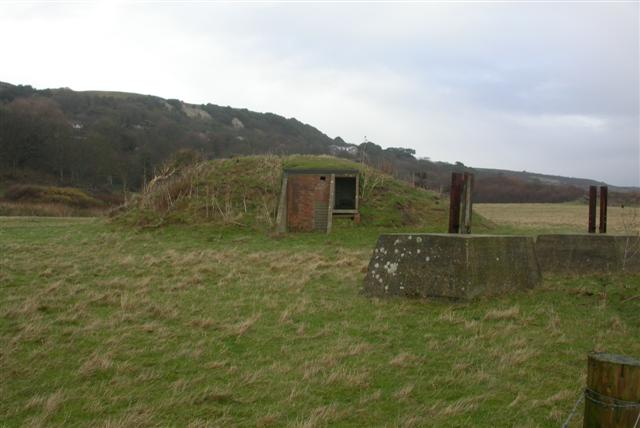
RAF St. Lawrence. Remains of a buried reserve CH radar site

Historical Population of St. Lawrence

Year	Pop.	±%
1801	76	—
1811	101	+32.9%
1821	96	−5.0%
1831	78	−18.8%
1841	114	+46.2%
1851	111	−2.6%

Year	Pop.	±%
1881	249	+124.3%
1891	318	+27.7%
1901	361	+13.5%
1911	366	+1.4%
1921	310	−15.3%
1931	329	+6.1%

Source data

In the 1870s the village was described in the Imperial Gazetteer of England and Wales as consisting of "ivy mantled thatched cottages, with orchards" with many Juniper trees nearby.

During World War II the village was home to RAF St Lawrence. Originally a temporary base for RAF Ventnor and RAF Thorney Island, by 1942 it was a fully active radar base in its own right. The base had two 120-foot-tall (37 m) masts approximately 200 yards apart. The base ceased operations in 1947 and in 1994 a memorial plaque was placed at the site.

On 8 August 1940, a Junkers Ju87b Stuka crashed at The Shute, a road in St Lawrence. It was piloted by Unteroffizier (Uffz) Fritz Pittroff and Uffz Rudolph Schubert.

== William Spindler ==
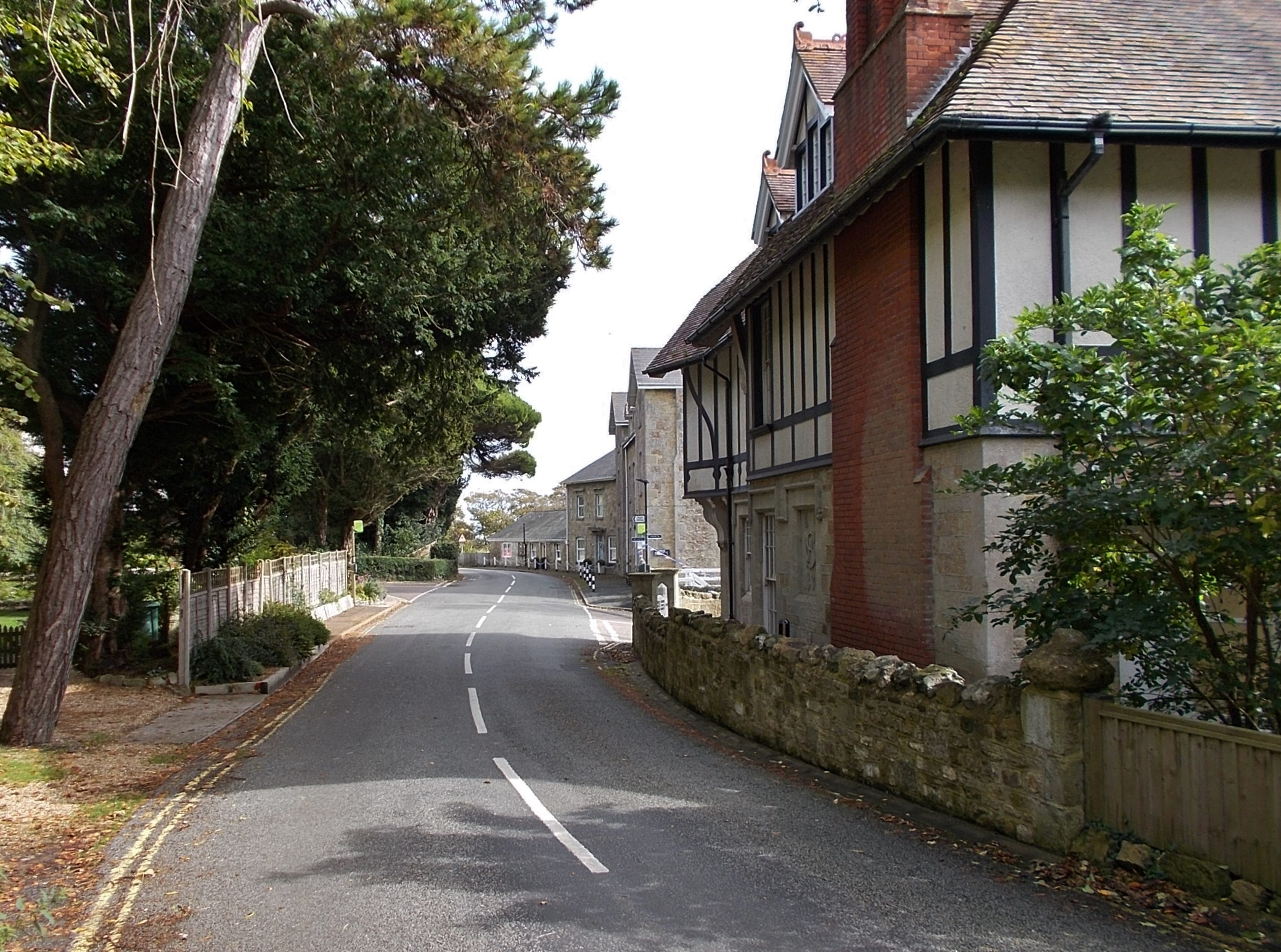
St Lawrence village

St Lawrence was in the nineteenth century the subject of an ambitious plan by a German developer and philanthropist, named William Spindler (who had made his fortune as a chemist in Berlin), to develop St Lawrence as a resort to rival Ventnor. He lived at Old Park, a mansion near Binnel Bay, from 1881 to his death in 1889 and is buried in Whitwell churchyard. During his time in St. Lawrence, he had an enormous influence there and on the surrounding areas. He possibly alienated local opinion with a series of "improving pamphlets" criticising local perceived laziness. He decried the lack of woodland in the area and employed local men to plant a million trees. He paid a large part of the money needed to supply St Lawrence and Whitwell with drinking water. You can see red-painted hydrants bearing lions' heads dotted about Whitwell's streets, and the occasional black-painted St Lawrence hydrants, one of which stands beside Seven Sisters Road, in the heart of the old village. Several huge pieces of masonry in Binnel Bay, all that is left of a harbour, are known locally as "Spindler's Follies".

== Amenities ==
The village has a post office, two churches and a village hall. A building at Old Park, where William Spindler lived, houses artists' studios, open to the public once a year over the August bank holiday weekend, together with The Bunker art gallery, housed in a Second World War radar station nearby.

Pelham Wood Nature Reserve is situated beside the Undercliff Drive and is open to the public. On the other side of the main road is a turning leading to St Lawrence Well, with its ornate Victorian well housing.

Close to the newer church is the entrance to the Rare Breeds Park, which closed down due to loss of revenue from legally enforced closure during the foot and mouth epidemic of 2001.

== Transport ==
The Undercliff Drive, the main road between Ventnor and Niton, was closed beyond St Lawrence in February 2014 by a landslip. Access was later restored for pedestrians and cyclists via a footbridge, the lack of through motorised traffic making this stretch of road much safer and quieter for walkers and cyclists than before. Due to the road closure, St Lawrence is now only served by local bus Number 31, operated by Minibus Plus.com on Tuesdays, Thursdays and Fridays.

== Notes ==
1.Published in Worsley, Sir Richard, History of the Isle of Wight, London, 1781
