= Bierley =

Bierley may refer to:

- Bierley, Isle of Wight, a hamlet in England
- Bierley, West Yorkshire, an area in City of Bradford, West Yorkshire, England
- Paul E. Bierley (1926–2016), an American music historian

== See also ==
- East Bierley, an area in Kirklees, West Yorkshire, England
