= Whitwell, Isle of Wight =

Village on the Isle of Wight, England

Coordinates: 50.596439°N 1.26302°W

Whitwell
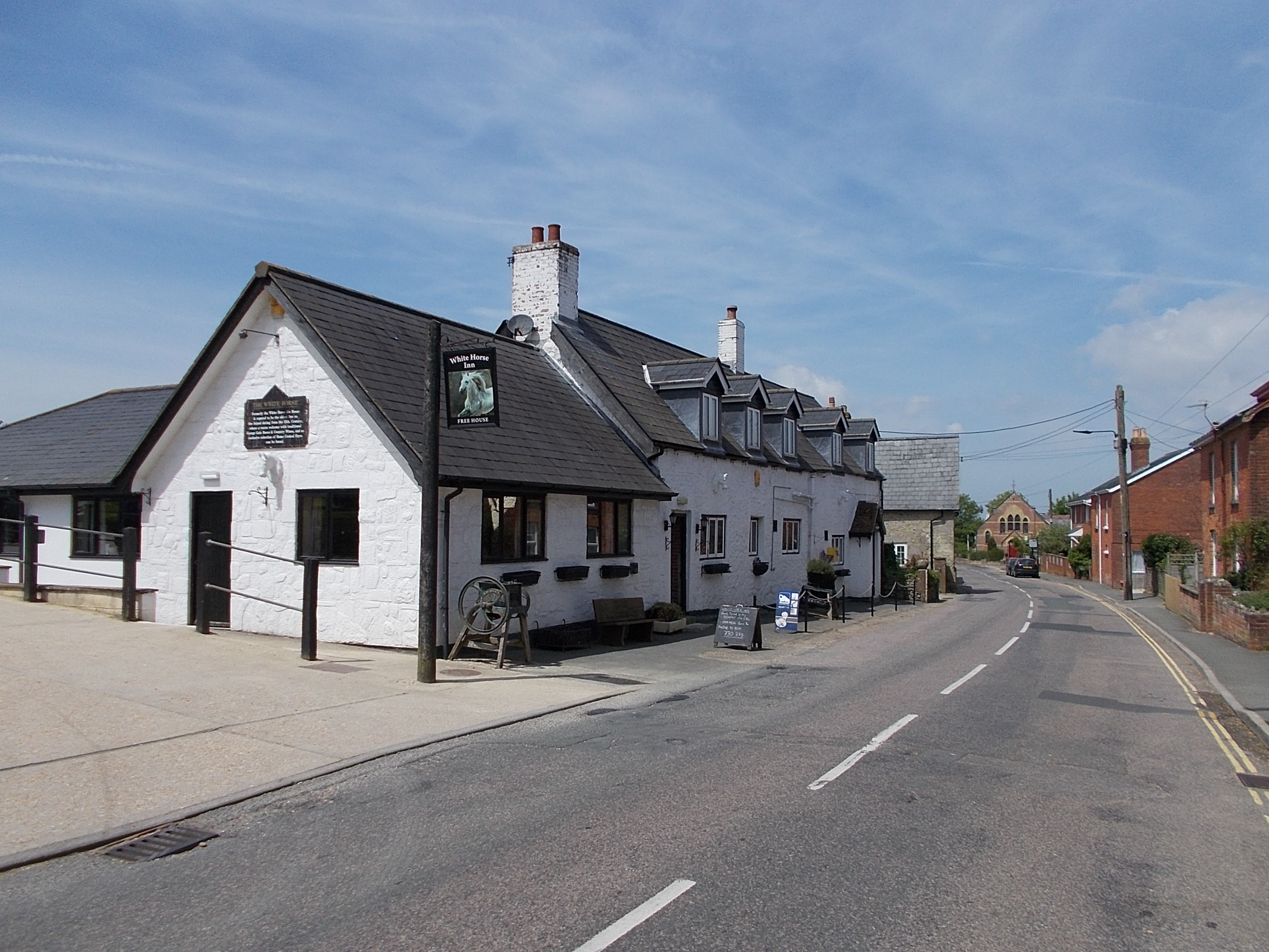

- Location within the Isle of Wight
- Population: 578 (2001 census)
- OS grid reference: SZ520770
  - London: 95.13 miles (153.10 km)
- Civil parish: Niton and Whitwell
- Unitary authority: Isle of Wight
- Ceremonial county: Isle of Wight
- Region: South East
- Country: England
- Sovereign state: United Kingdom
- Post town: VENTNOR
- Postcode district: PO38
- Dialling code: 01983
- Police: Hampshire and Isle of Wight
- Fire: Hampshire and Isle of Wight
- Ambulance: Isle of Wight
- UK Parliament: Isle of Wight West

Whitwell is a small village and former civil parish, now in the parish of Niton and Whitwell, on the south of the Isle of Wight, England, approximately 5 kilometres north-west of Ventnor, the village's nearest town. In addition to this, it is about five minutes away from its neighbouring small villages of Godshill and Niton. According to 2001 census data, the total population of the village was 578. There is a variety of stone and thatched housing, as well as some more modern housing, the most recent of which was completed in 2006.

Whitwell's small size has led it to become a very close-knit community with a range of amenities including a garage, a 700-year-old church, the oldest pub on the island, dating back from the 15th century and a post office, which was recently re-located to a new premises inside the church bell tower. A trout farm is located towards Nettlecombe, with three lakes covering 1.5 acres (0.61 ha). The waters are well stocked with carp, roach and tench.

Whitwell is named after the "White Well" inside the village. The well was visited by many during medieval times on pilgrimages, and now well dressing occurs annually each summer. Across Whitwell, six more old water standards can be seen. They were built in 1887 by William Spindler. Half the cost of installing the wells was covered by William Spindler himself, the remainder by people of the village. The water was supplied by Mr Granville Ward from a spring on his land at Bierley.

== History ==
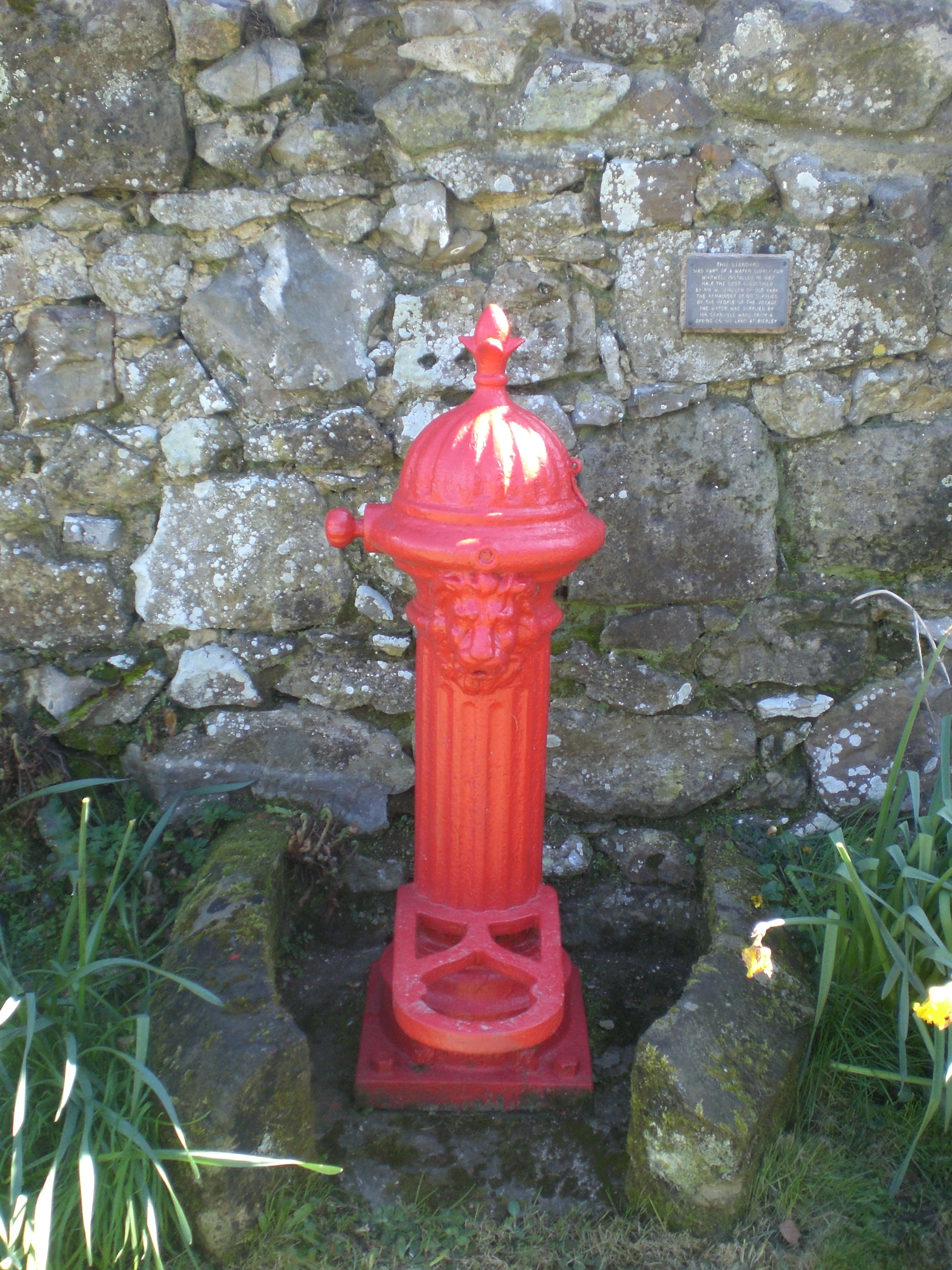
One of six red iron water pumps in the village.

"White" is derived from an Old English word meaning clean or pure, and the village of Whitwell is likely to take its name from a well or spring with a reliable supply of fresh water. The original White Well, located towards the south end of the village was once a place of veneration as a 'holy well' and a site of pilgrimage in the Middle Ages. The waters of the well were believed to contain healing powers for the infirm. The tradition of Well Dressing was started and now occurs annually at the site of the well. Each year the well is dressed and blessed by the local vicar giving thanks for water and a blessing for the village.

In the village, six red iron water pumps can be seen at various intervals. These were built in 1887 by William Spindler of St Lawrence whose tomb now lies in Whitwell Graveyard. One is located next to the White Well in Ventnor Road, two along Kemming Road, two along the High Street, and one on Nettlecombe Road.

Many of the village's buildings such as the White Horse pub, date back to the 15th century. The Church has portions dating back to as far as the 12th century, with newer additions built in the 13th, 15th and 16th centuries. In comparison to this and the rest of the village, new housing has been built relatively recently along Bannock Road. The latest new housing was completed in 2006.

In 2009 Whitwell won the award for the best kept large village, in addition to the award for the overall island's best kept village, an award it has previously won in 2003. Judges from the competition were impressed by maintenance of bus stops, verges seats, commercial premises and gardens and the success of the new post office.

== Governance ==
Whitwell lies within the parliamentary constituency of the Isle of Wight West with the seat held by Labour member Richard Quigley since 2024, and within the area of the Isle of Wight Council. Together with Niton, the village forms a civil parish, chaired by Councillor Tim Addison. The Parish Council has ten members, six for the Niton ward and four for the Whitwell ward, and meets ten times annually.

In 1931 the parish had a population of 636. On 1 April 1933 the parish was abolished and merged with Niton and Ventnor.

== Geography ==
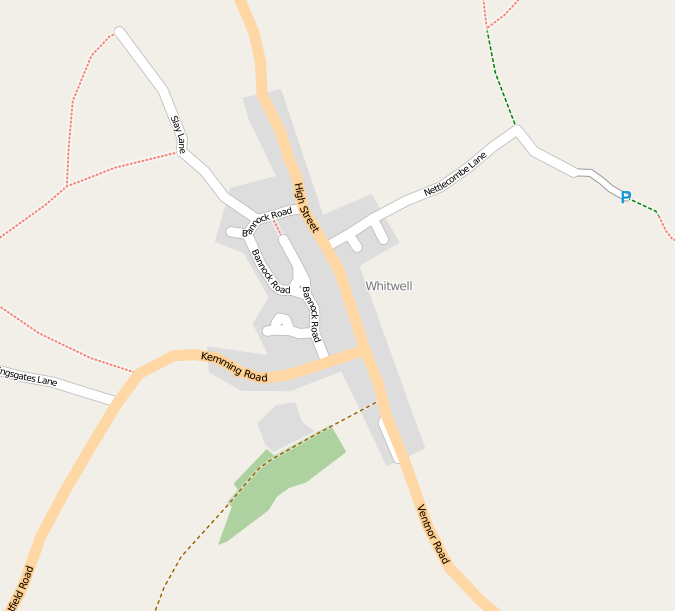
A map of Whitwell and the surrounding area

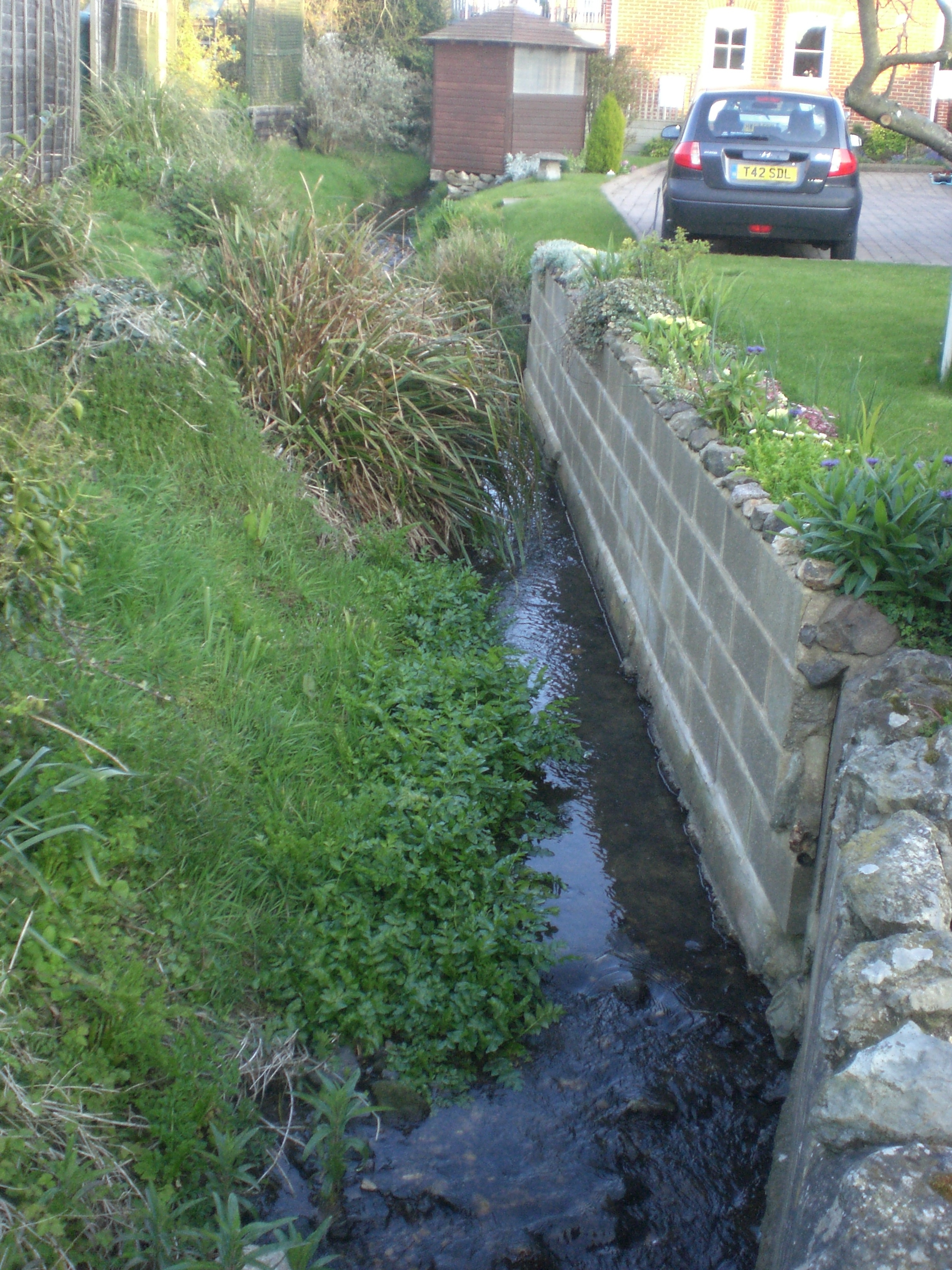
The River Yar's infant tributary in Whitwell

Whitwell is located in the south of the Isle of Wight, slightly to the south of Godshill, and extends to the southern end. The nearest town is Ventnor, about 5 kilometres South of the village. Niton is the nearest village about 2 miles (3.2 km) away, which together, Whitwell and Niton form a civil parish. Also close to the village, is Nettlecombe, the site of a lost medieval village located slightly to the north east. The entire village is surrounded mainly by fields and classed as an 'Area of Outstanding Natural Beauty, forming part of the Isle of Wight AONB.' The relief is mainly flat, with some slight hills. It contains 1,910 acres (7.7 km^{2}) of land, 687 acres (2.78 km^{2}) in 1905 being arable land, 775½ acres permanent grass, and 74½ acres woodland.

With the villages co-ordinates at N 50.60223 W 1.29967, its climate is warm, with a sea breeze coming in from the coast. It benefits from Ventnor's micro-climate as a result of being in a sheltered location on the cliff of the island's south coast. This offers the village more sunny days than much of the British Isles, and fewer frosts.

The Eastern Yar, with its mouth in the north-east of the island, extends an infant tributary to Whitwell and at one point, a stone sheep wash is still present. The River Yar Trail was set up on 24 May 2002, with a milestone outside the White Horse in Whitwell.

Whitwell's built environment is characterised by its mixture of stone and thatched housing. There is a mixture of single and two-story houses, with most single-story housing on Bannock Road, recently developed with a small estate of bungalows. Terraced housing features in the centre of the village. The most notable house in the village is The Old Rectory, close to the church and was formerly a bed and breakfast.

== Church ==
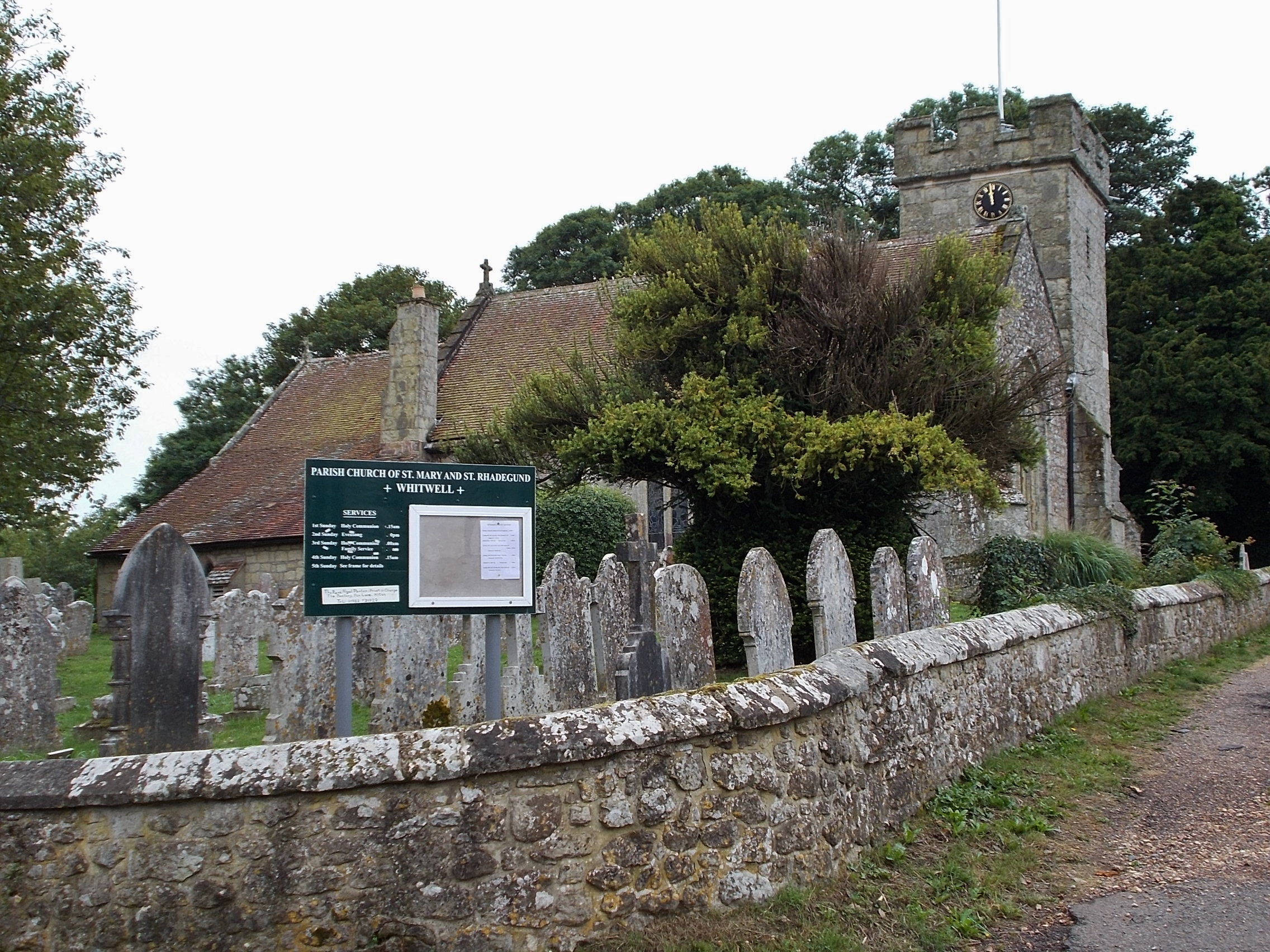
Whitwell parish church, with its unusual dedication to St Rhadegund

The Church of St. Mary and St. Radegund is a Church of England church, located at the south end of the village, adjoining the rectory. It is the only church in the village. Parts of the church date back to different centuries, the earliest being 12th, with later parts added in the 13th, 15th and 16th century. In April 2007, the village's post office was relocated inside the church's bell tower, the first of its kind to actually be located inside the church.

== Amenities ==
The village used to have a wide range of facilities used by local residents. However over the years, many of these have gone. These include two shops, a playgroup, its Methodist church, the forge, a nursing home and youth hostel. The facilities left include:

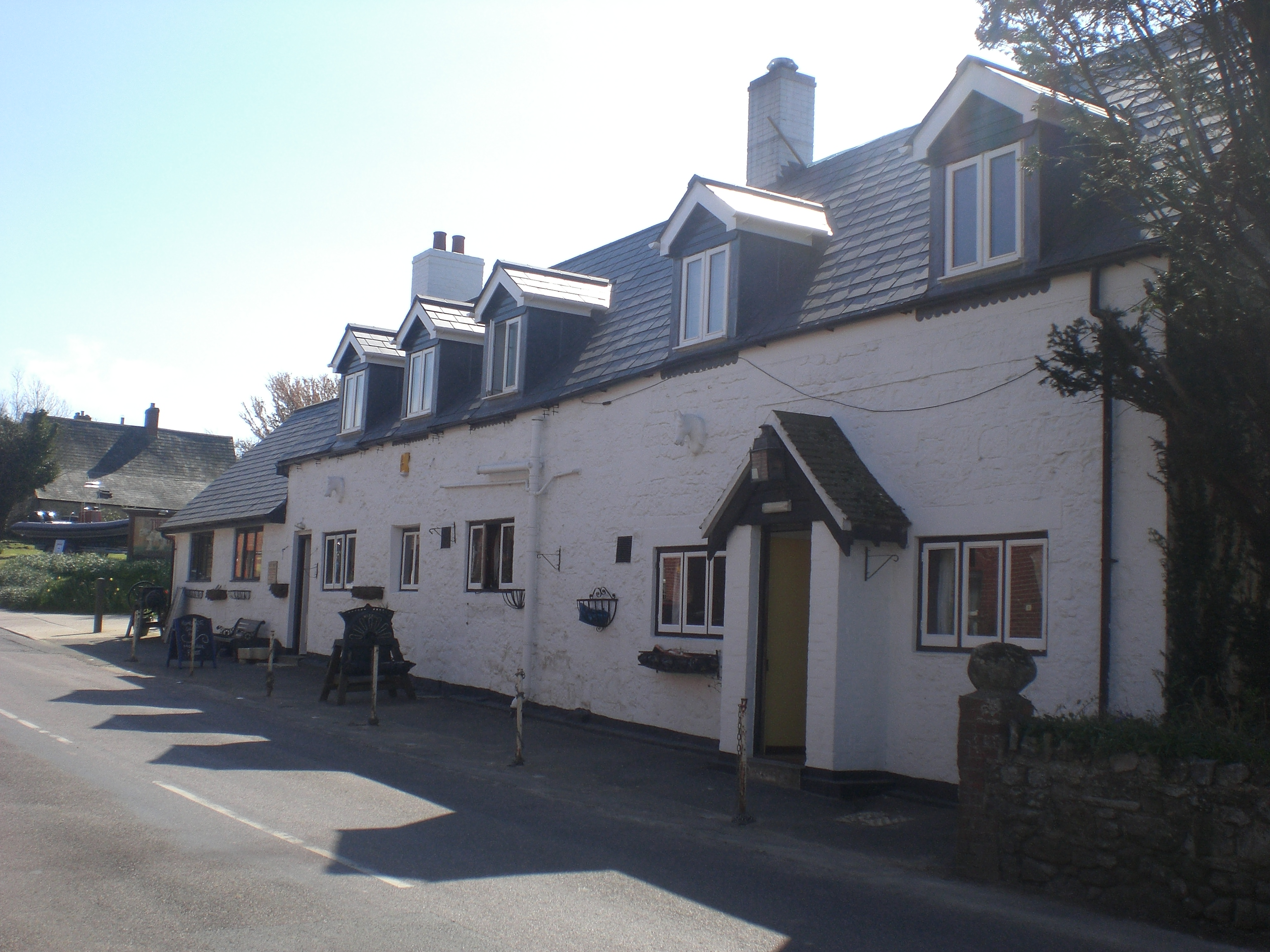
The White Horse

- Post Office – The village used to have its own, family owned post office. This was closed in 2006, however later in 2007 was relocated onto a new premises inside the church.
- Village hall – It is used to host a variety of activities, as well as the Whitwell Village Show, which takes place annually each summer.

Due to the village's small size and small population of 578, most amenities are located outside the village. Many are located in the slightly larger neighbouring village of Niton, such as a Pharmacy and doctor's surgery. Others are located in the nearby town of Ventnor.

== Events ==
=== Whitfun ===
In 2012, Whitwell held a traditional street party in celebration of the Queen's Diamond Jubilee. The Kemming Road was closed to traffic for the day between the High Street and Bannock Road. It was a great success with over 100 children at the street party which was followed by games in the grounds of the Old Rectory and a party, with a hog roast, live music and the 'Red Gun bar', at Prospect Cottage. It was agreed to hold a similar event the following year - as a village party called Whitfun ( it was in Whitwell and held on the Whitsun Bank Holiday weekend). This has been held each year on the Saturday of the Spring Bank Holiday (traditionally Whitsun), moving from the garden of Prospect Cottage to the garden of the White Horse Inn in 2015. It still features a programme of live music and the 'Red Gun bar', despite being in the pub garden.

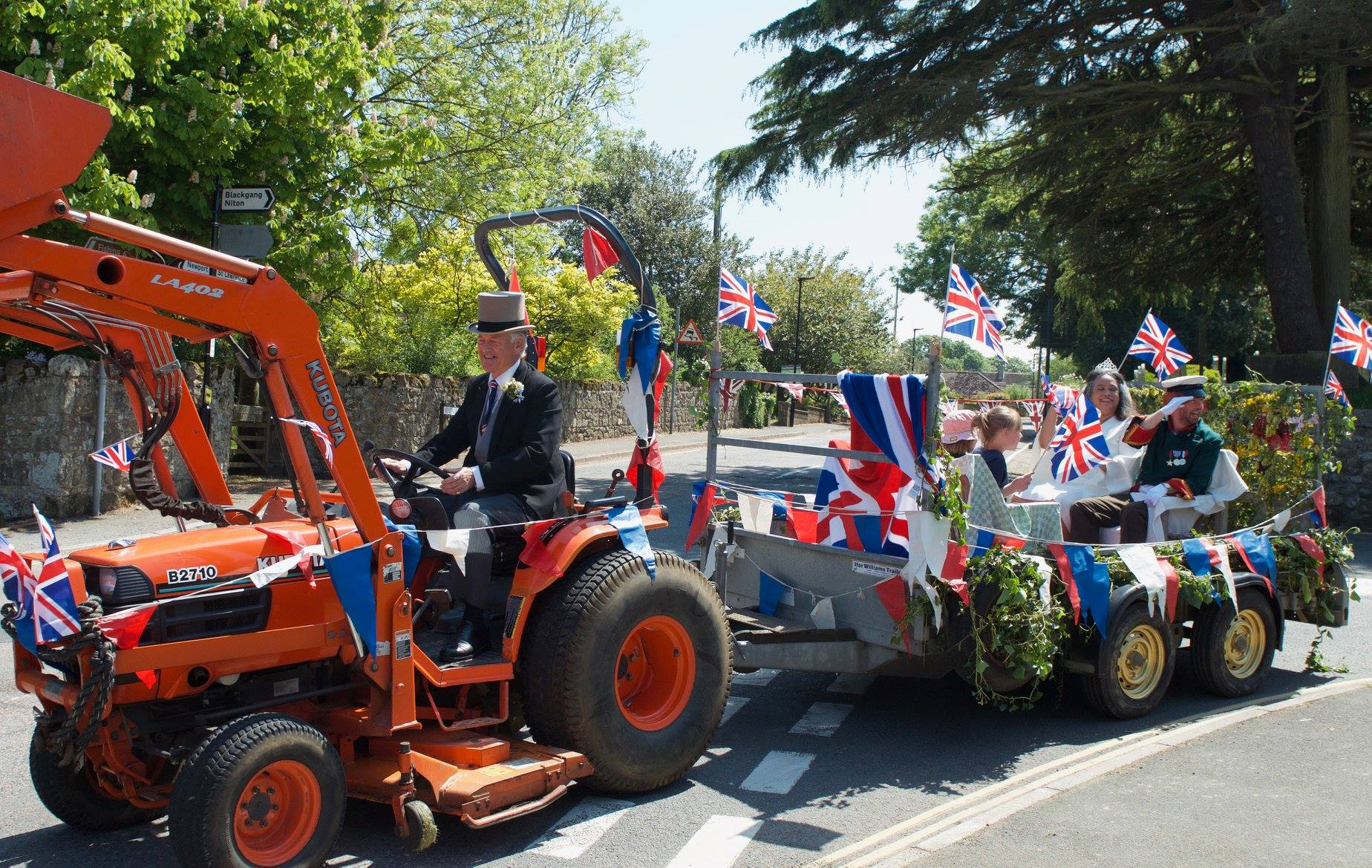
Royal wedding 'carriage procession' at Whitfun 2018

In 2018, Whitfun moved to 19 May to celebrate the royal wedding of Prince Harry and Meghan Markle.

=== Whitwell Church Fete ===
Each summer the village holds a fete, normally in July, in aid of church funds. This has been held in a number of locations including, in recent years, the Old Rectory grounds and Whitwell Manor Farm.

== Transport ==
=== Rail ===
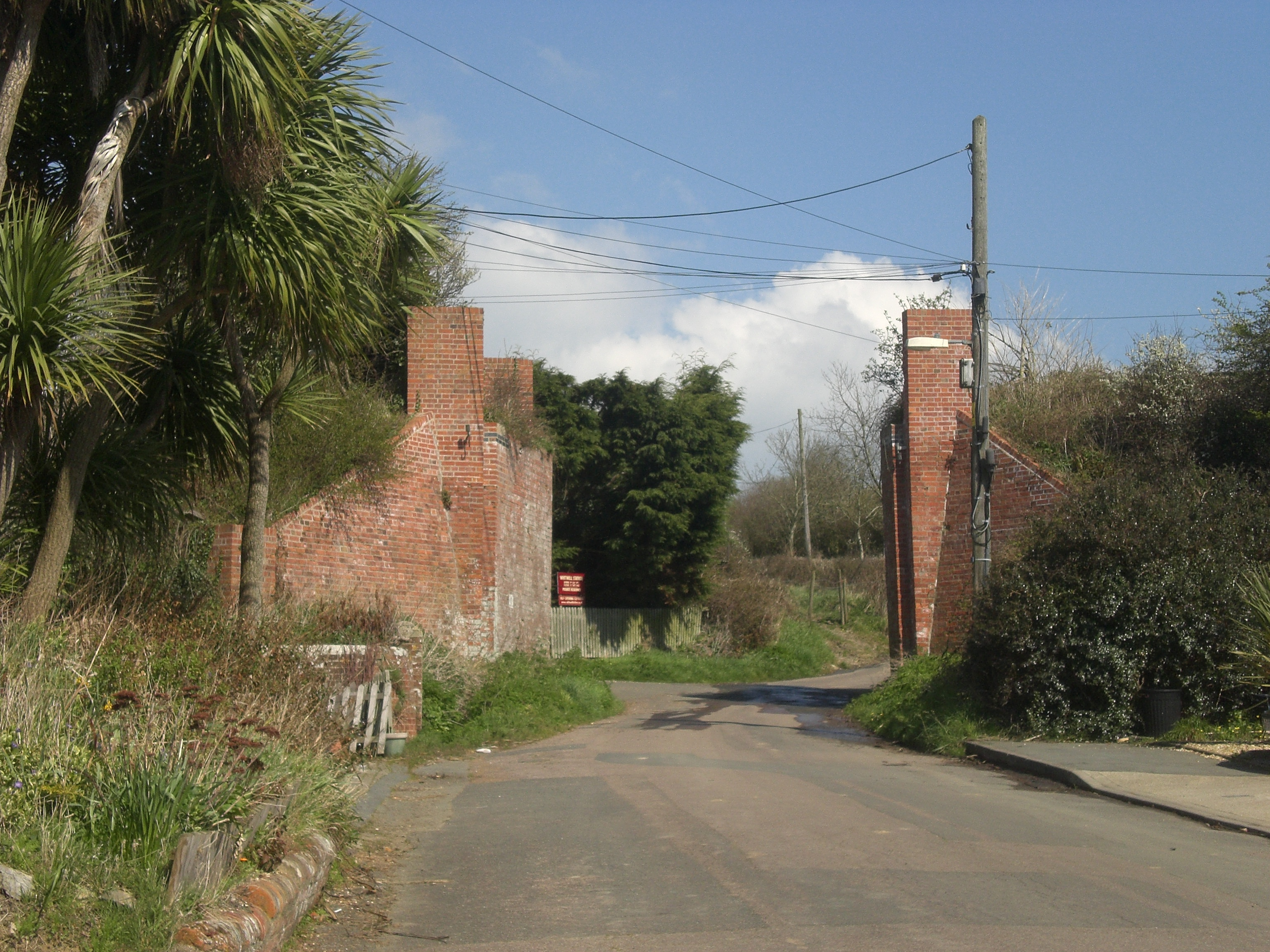
An old section of railtrack, leading to Whitwell Station.

Whitwell Station, on the Ventnor West branch of the Isle of Wight Central Railway, was opened along with the other stations on the branch on 20 July 1897. It was equipped with a passing loop, two platforms, a signal box and a substantial station building. Located at the top of Nettlecombe Lane, the station is located close to the village and the community it was intended to serve, unlike any other stations on the line.

However the track has now closed, and the waiting rooms have now been converted into two cottages and the old up platform has been restored. The site is now a popular tourist destination and is used for holiday accommodation. An old railway tunnel just outside the village is used as a mushroom farm. Another tunnel is still present on Nettlecombe Lane (pictured to the left) leading to the station.

=== Bus ===
Southern Vectis bus route 6 links the village with the towns of Newport and Ventnor, including intermediate villages. The last bus from Newport is early at 18:22 providing no evening service for the village. The seasonal 'Island Coaster' also runs through the village during the summer. Wightbus and Southern Vectis take students to school, which has caused some controversy over two bus companies taking a small number of students to school.

=== Roads ===
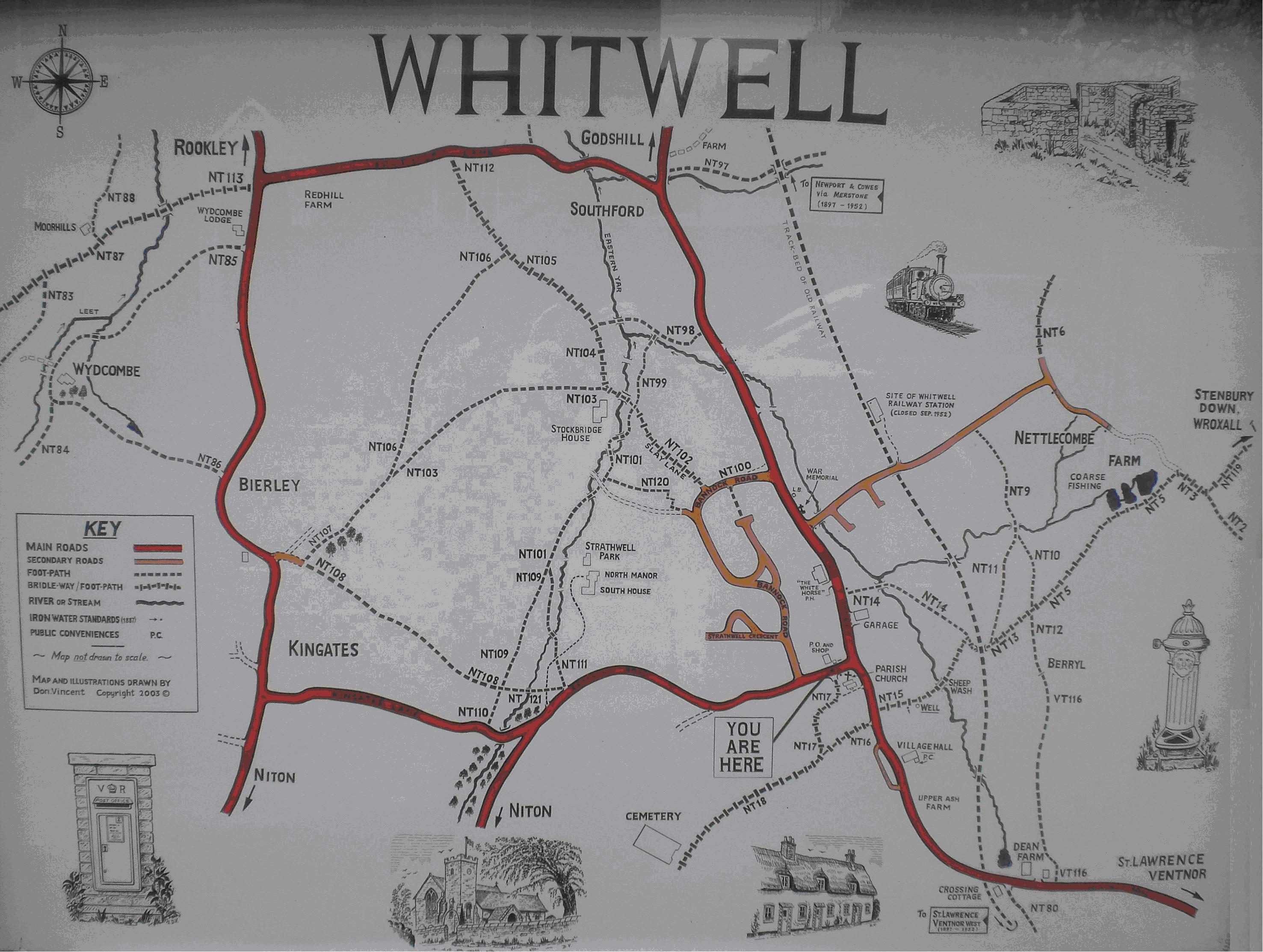
A Map of Whitwell.

There are only three roads exiting the village, Ventnor Road leading to Ventnor, Kemming Road leading to Niton and the main High Street which leads to Godshill.

The main road leading to Ventnor has recently been widened and resurfaced to cope with the larger number of cars using it, however this has caused controversy with nearby residents with reports of many cars speeding through the village. A sign was later put up, warning motorists if their speed exceeded the 30-mile per hour speed limit. More were later put up across other parts of the village.

=== Walking ===
The River Yar trail runs through the village with the milestone outside the village Pub. In addition to this, bridleways are maintained, running to nearby villages Wroxall and Niton. Future plans could see a pedestrian link from Whitwell to Niton along the main road.
