= Binnel Bay =

Coordinates: 50°34′43″N 1°16′16″W

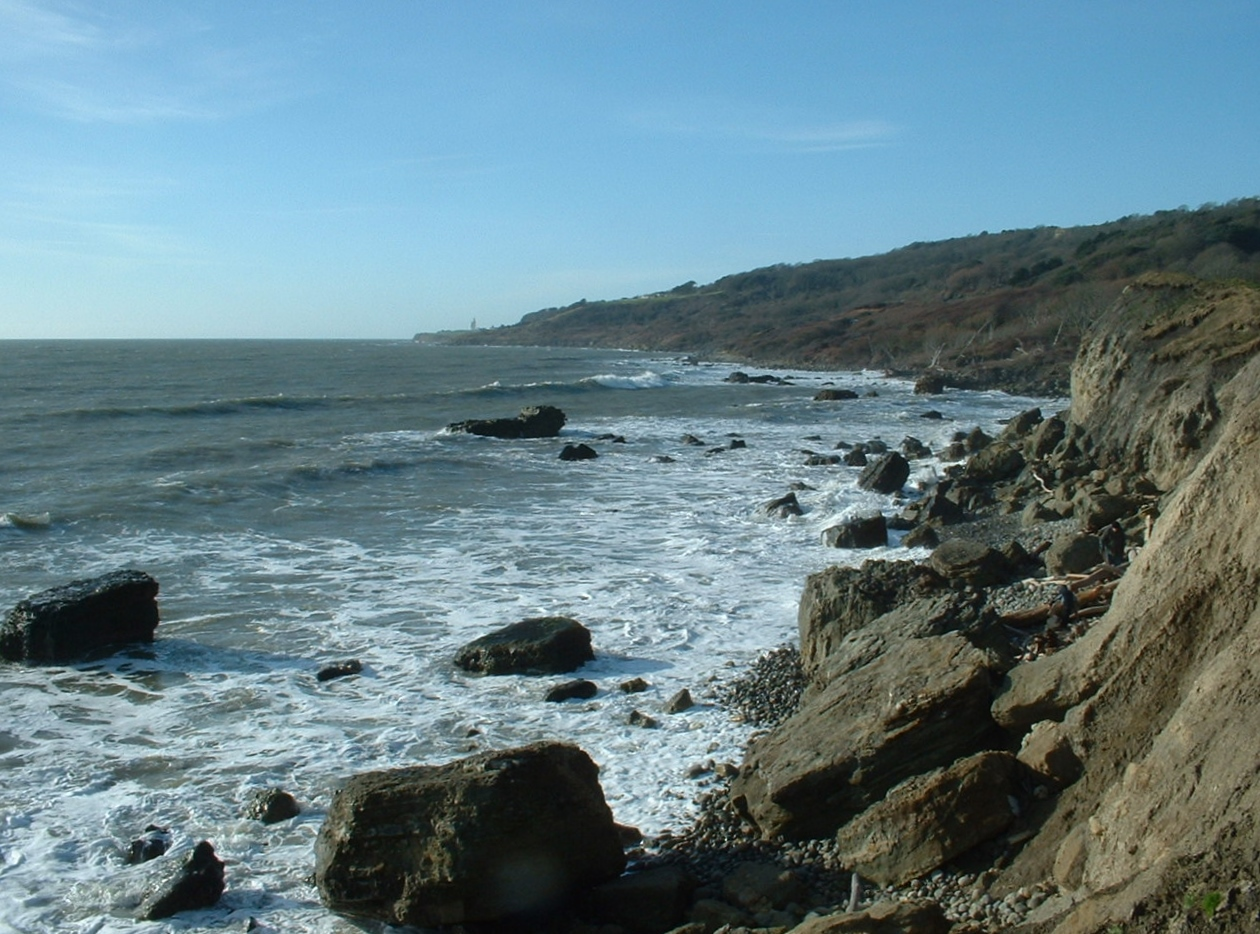
- Binnel Bay looking southwest, with St. Catherine's Point in the distance

- Location within the Isle of Wight
- Civil parish: Niton and Whitwell
- Ceremonial county: Isle of Wight
- Region: South East
- Country: England
- Sovereign state: United Kingdom

Binnel Bay is a bay on the south coast of the Isle of Wight, England. It lies between the villages of St. Lawrence and Niton. It faces south towards the English Channel, and is just under one mile (1.6 km) in length. It stretches from Binnel Point in the east to Puckaster Cove in the west.

The bay is remote with a rocky and exposed shoreline backed by low cliffs and woodlands. It is best viewed from Binnel Point, where the bay can be seen stretching west towards Puckaster Cove, with St Catherine's Lighthouse visible in the distance. Large sections of a now destroyed 19th century seawall can be seen along the shore.

== Geology ==
The coastline is part of the Undercliff landslide complex, a large coastal landslide zone that spans the south coast of the Isle of Wight from Bonchurch to Blackgang. As a result the cliffs and coastline at Binnel Bay are formed from landslide debris derived from the Gault Clay and Upper Greensand, overlying in-situ exposures of Lower Greensand.

The coastal slope above Binnel Bay is geologically unstable has experienced several recent landslides. The most notable was a landslide in March 2014 that lead to the loss of a section of the A3055 and the closure of Undercliff Drive, along with the evacuation and abandonment of several properties.

== History ==
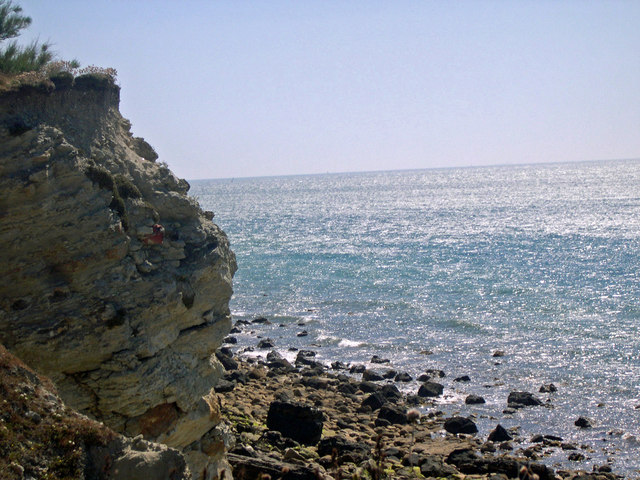
The Cliff face at Binnel Bay

Archaeological findings from the landslide deposits at Binnel Bay have identified evidence of human activity in this area of the Undercliff dating back to the Neolithic. These finds included a Neolithic soil horizon dated to 2530BC, containing charcoal and the remains of red squirrel, red deer and marine molluscs. Later prehistoric evidence includes midden deposits of Bronze Age to Iron Age date.

In 1977 a Paleolithic handaxe of Acheulean style was discovered on land immediately west of Binnel Bay. It is thought the handaxe may have originated from deposits that were originally on the downland above the Undercliff, and were subsequently worked into the landslide complex at a later date.

In 1882 William Spindler, an eccentric German industrialist, attempted to build a harbour and resort in St Lawrence to rival Ventnor to the east, though he would ultimately die before it could be completed. Spindler bought a large estate, including a house (now the Old Park Hotel) which had belonged to Sir Richard Worsley, 7th Baronet, the island's governor from 1780-1782. He planned on constructing a town and planted trees, laid roads but most notably created a seawall at Binnel Bay. The seawall was substantial and designed to allow tourists to reach St Lawrence by sea. However, due to the geological instability of the Undercliff landslide complex at Binnel Bay it had poor foundations, being largely built on active and landslide sections of Gault Clay. It fell into disrepair and was destroyed through a combination of landsliding and severe winter storms and swells. The failed harbour was dubbed Spindler's Folly, and the remains can be seen broken up and scattered around the bay today.
