= Mount Bay =

Coordinates: 50°35′10″N 1°14′06″W

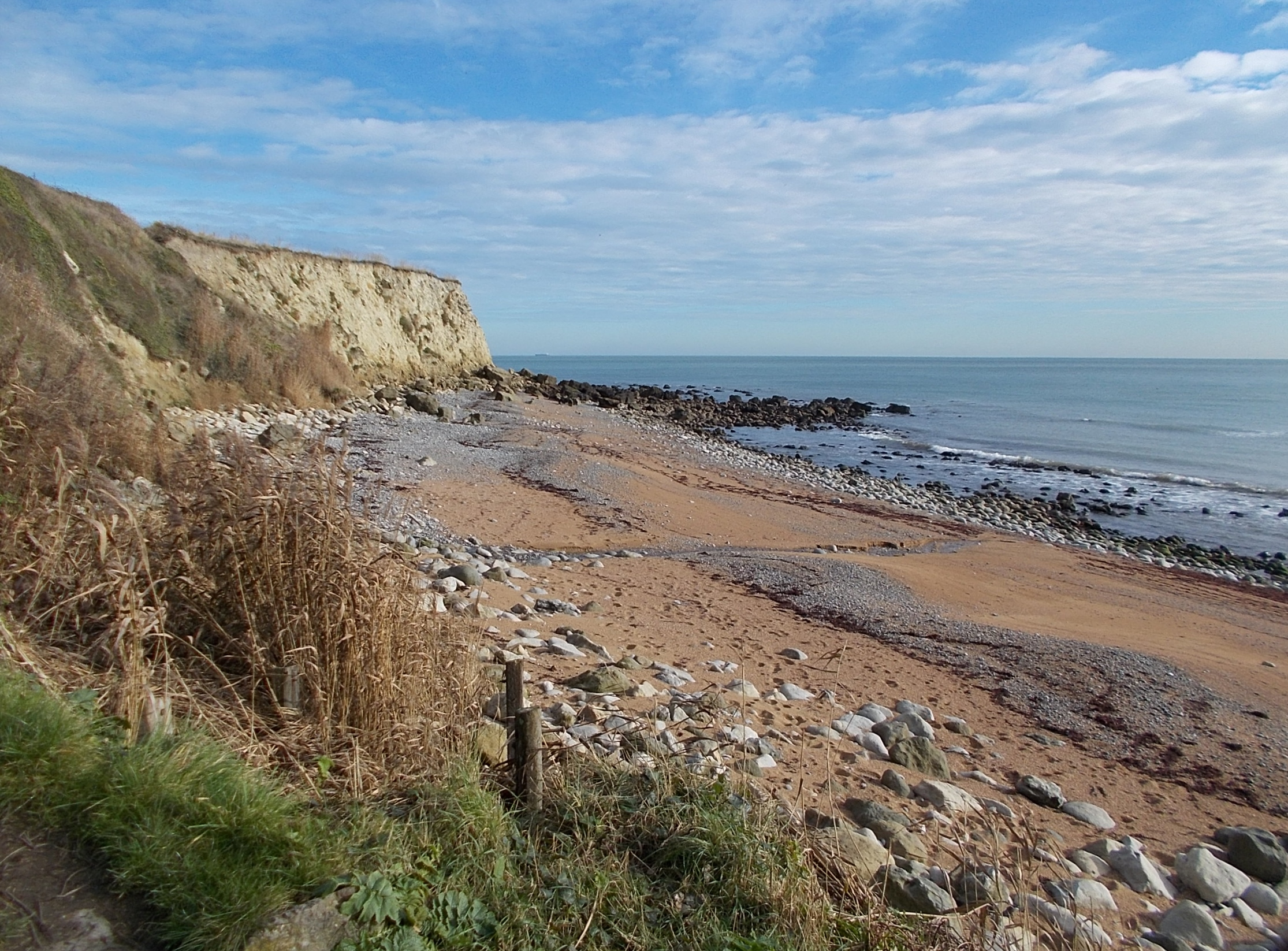
- Mount Bay

- Location within the Isle of Wight
- Civil parish: Ventnor
- Ceremonial county: Isle of Wight
- Region: South East
- Country: England
- Sovereign state: United Kingdom
- UK Parliament: Isle of Wight East

Mount Bay is a small bay with a shingle beach on the south-east Undercliff coastline of the Isle of Wight, England, south of the village of St. Lawrence and west of Ventnor. Its shoreline is 260 yards (240 m) in length. It faces south towards the English Channel and is similar in character to the adjacent Orchard Bay, though without a beachside property. Access to the beach is made down an uneven footpath from the Isle of Wight Coastal Path.

The beach is situated west of the Ventnor Botanic Gardens and like the rest of the Undercliff is part of the local microclimate, that allegedly makes it one of the warmest places in England.

The cliffs backing the bay are formed from landslide debris, derived from the Upper Greensand Formation.
