= St Lawrence's Church, St Lawrence =

Coordinates: 50°35′11″N 01°14′31″W

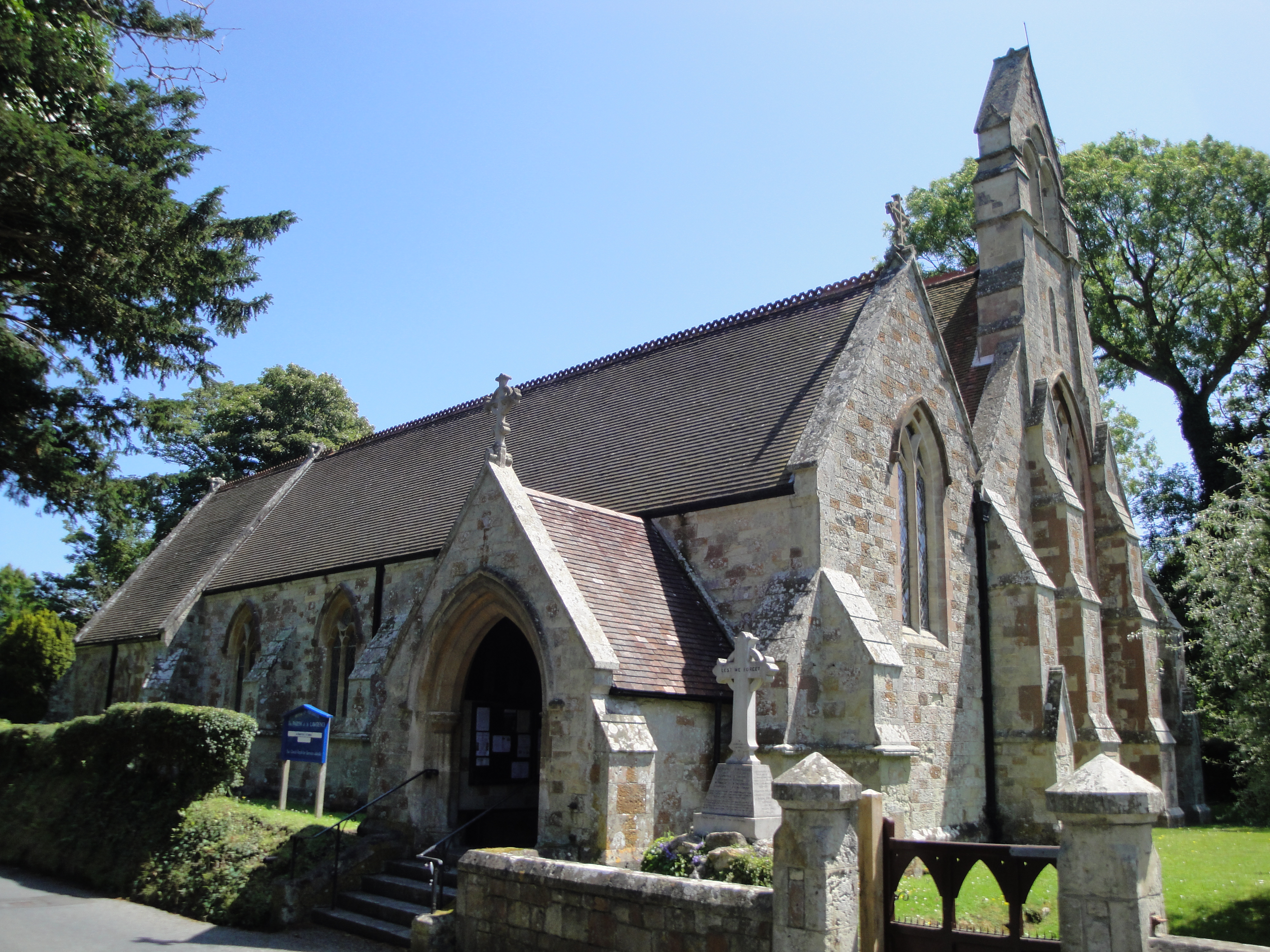
- The church from the northeast
- St Lawrence's Church, St Lawrence
- Denomination: Church of England
- Churchmanship: Broad Church

History
- Dedication: St Lawrence

Architecture
- Architect: Sir George Gilbert Scott

Administration
- Province: Canterbury
- Diocese: Portsmouth
- Parish: St Lawrence, Isle of Wight

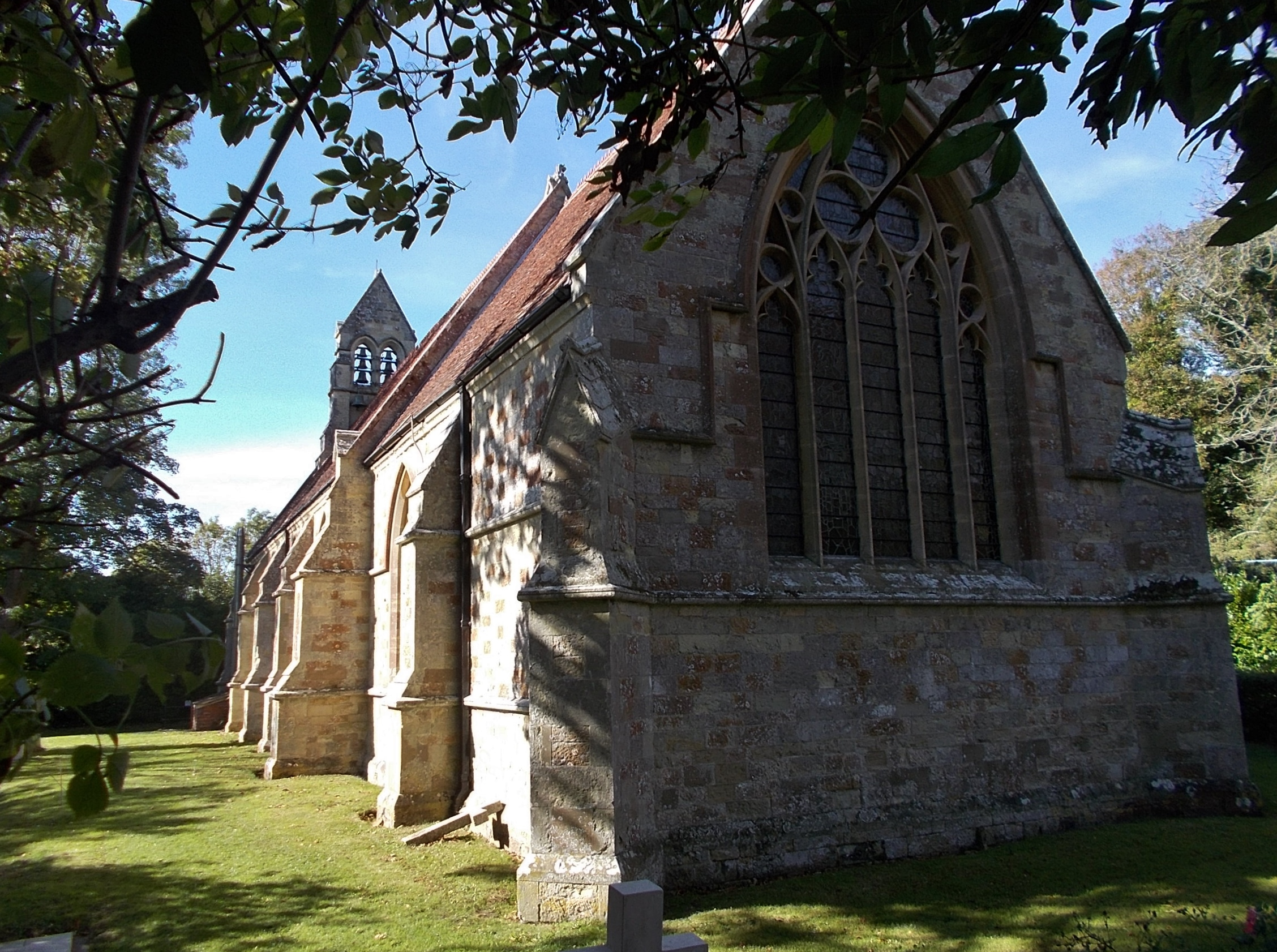
View from the south west

St Lawrence's Church, St Lawrence is a parish church in the Church of England located in St Lawrence, Isle of Wight. It is recorded in the National Heritage List for England as a designated Grade II* listed building.

== History ==
The church was built in 1878 to a design by Sir George Gilbert Scott. and consists of a nave, chancel, north aisle, porch and western turret with eight bells, cast in 1935. The church's font was taken from old St Lawrence's Church.

The church's stained glass were produced by Edward Burne-Jones, William Morris and Ford Madox Brown.

== Organ ==
A specification of the organ can be found on the National Pipe Organ Register.
