= List of tourist attractions in the Isle of Wight =

Key
	Abbey/Priory/Cathedral
Accessible open space	Accessible open space
	Amusement/Theme Park
	Castle
Country Park	Country Park
	English Heritage
	Forestry Commission
Heritage railway	Heritage railway
Historic house	Historic House
Places of Worship	Places of Worship
Museum (free) Museum	Museum (free/not free)
National Trust	National Trust
	Theatre
	Zoo

The following is a list of tourist attractions on the Isle of Wight.

Ryde Arena (Ice Skating)	Ryde
Amazon World	Arreton
Appuldurcombe House	Wroxall
Bembridge Windmill	Bembridge
Blackgang Chine	Blackgang
Borthwood Copse	Sandown
Brading Roman Villa	Brading
Calbourne Water Mill	Calbourne
Carisbrooke Castle	Carisbrooke
Classic Boat Museum	East Cowes
Dimbola Lodge	Freshwater
Dinosaur Isle	Sandown
East Cowes Castle	East Cowes
Farringford House	Freshwater
Fort Victoria	Yarmouth
Haseley Manor	Arreton
Isle of Wight Bus & Coach Museum	Newport
Isle of Wight Steam Railway	Smallbrook – Havenstreet
Isle of Wight Zoo	Sandown
The Needles	Alum Bay
The Needles Batteries	Alum Bay
Newport Roman Villa	Newport
Newtown Old Town Hall	Newtown
Osborne House	East Cowes
Quarr Abbey	Wootton
Robin Hill	Downend
Seaview Wildlife Encounter	Seaview
Shanklin Chine	Shanklin
St. Catherine's Oratory	Niton
Underwater Archaeology Centre	Fort Victoria
Ventnor Botanic Gardens	Ventnor
Yarmouth Castle	Yarmouth

== See also ==
- List of beaches of the Isle of Wight
