= Bierley, Isle of Wight =

Hamlet on the Isle of Wight, England

Coordinates: 50.59°N 1.28°W

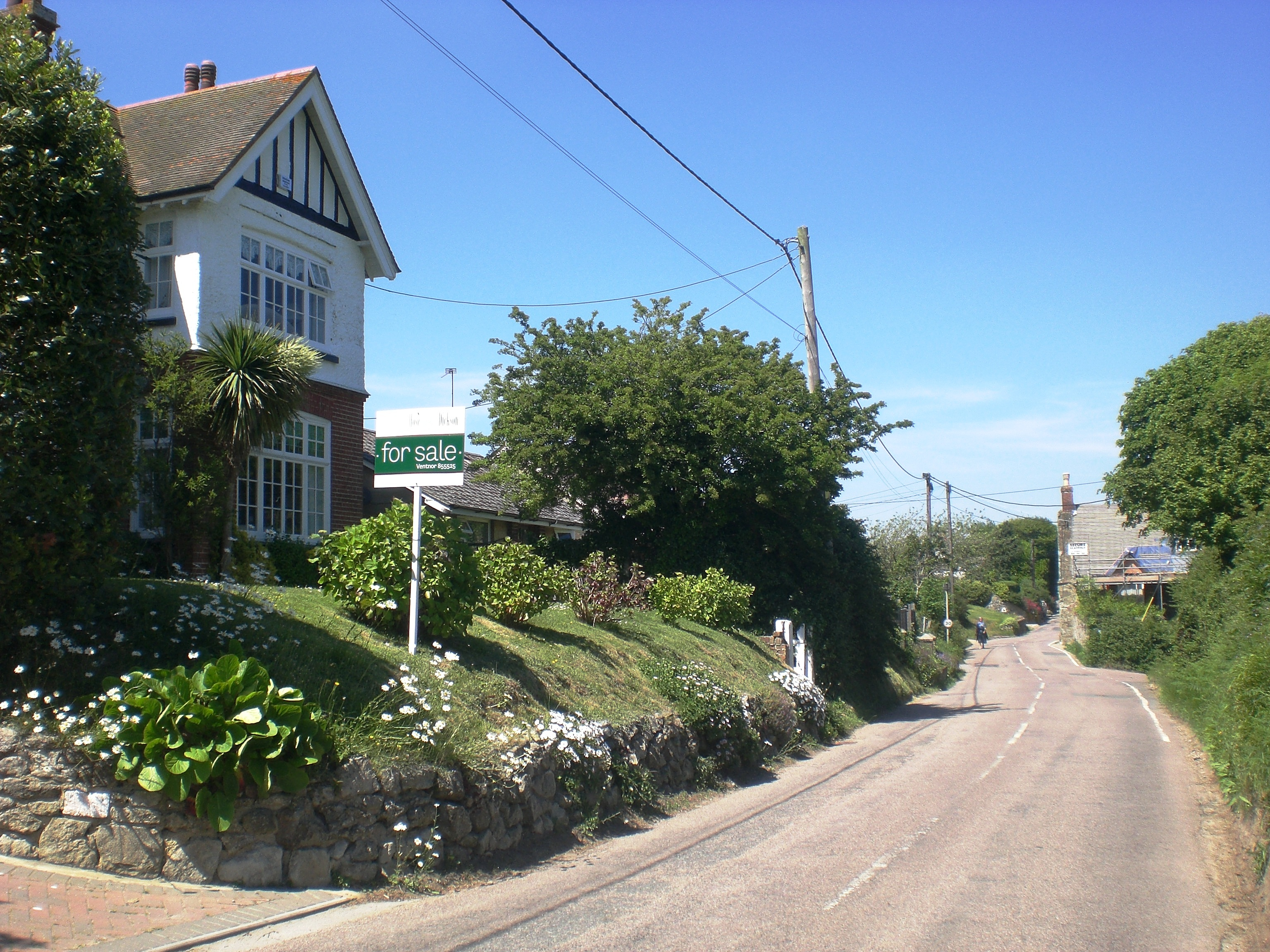
Newport Road running through Bierley.

Bierley is a hamlet on the Isle of Wight, UK. Bierley is in the south of the Isle of Wight, north of Niton and 0.7 miles to the west of Whitwell. Bierley is at the corner of Kingates Lane and Newport Road.

== Name ==
The name means 'the woodland clearing where barley is grown', from Old English bere and lēah.

1279: Berehulle

1280: Berhulle

1445: Berelle

1781: Berryl

Berryl is another hamlet on the Isle of Wight, near the village of Whitwell and a similar meaning ('the hill where barley is grown', from Old English bere and hyll).

== Waterfall ==
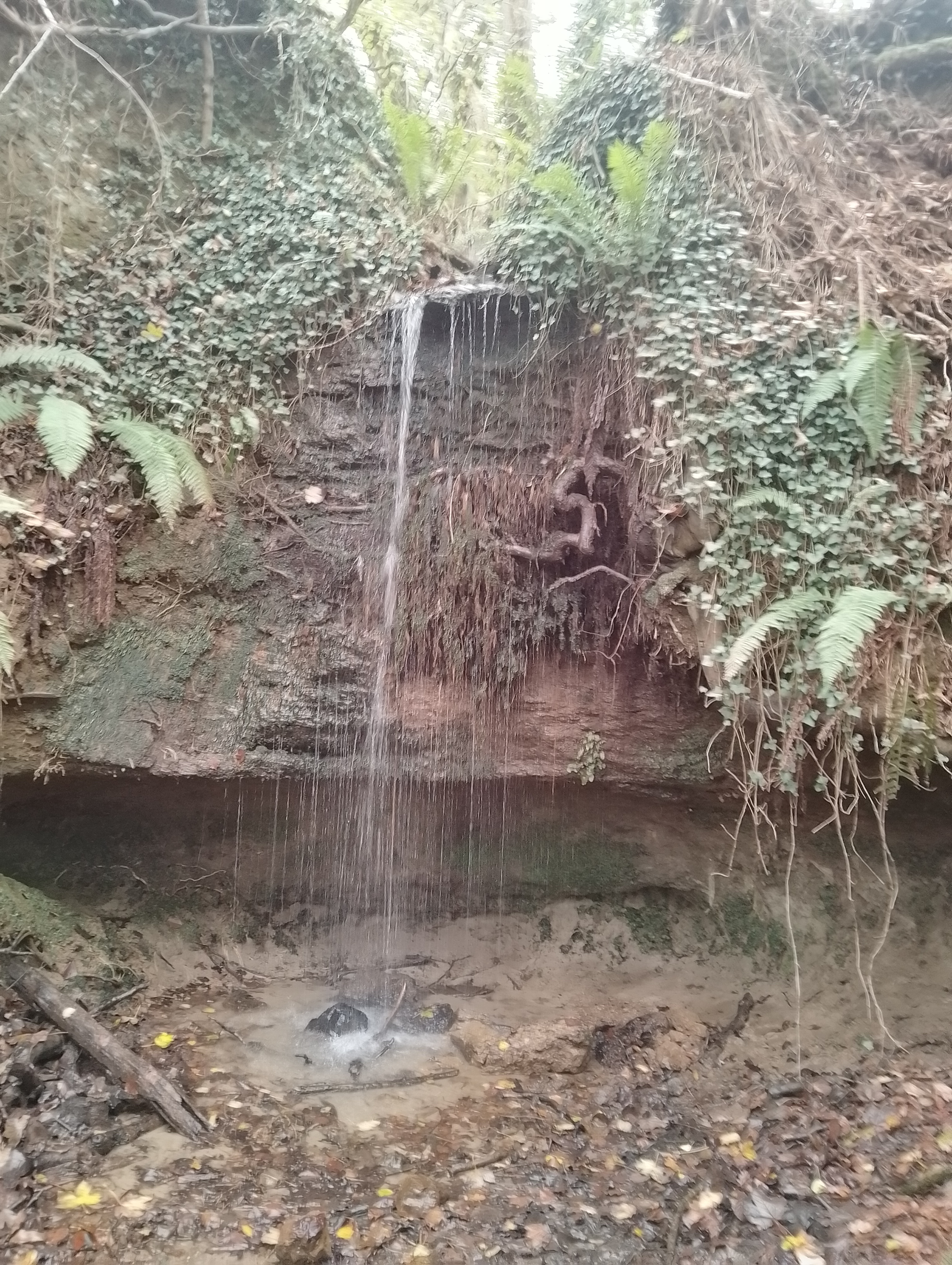
The Bierley Waterfall.

The Bierley Waterfall is a waterfall a short distance from the hamlet. It can be accessed from 2 footpaths.

== Brickmaking ==
Bierley was the site of brickmaking operations in the past. The Prichetts, a local family involved in brickmaking, opened the Bierley brickyard in 1800. In the 1901 Census the brickmaking operations were being run by William Scovell of Ryde.

== Amenities ==
Public transport is provided by Southern Vectis bus route 6, running from Newport to Ventnor.
