= Puckaster =

Hamlet on the Isle of Wight, England

Coordinates: 50°34′48″N 1°17′03″W

- Hamlet
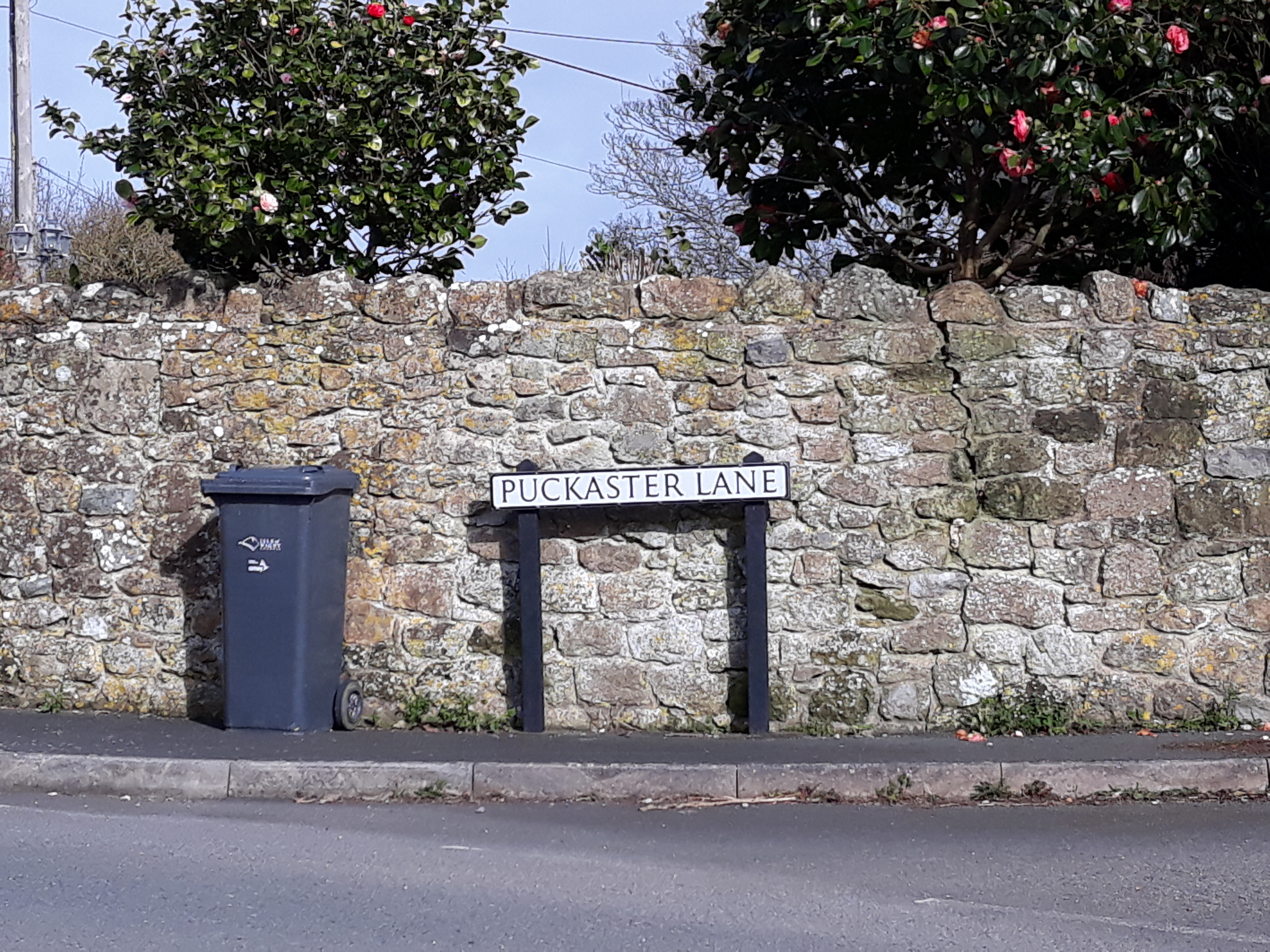
- Puckaster Lane

- Location within the Isle of Wight
- OS grid reference: SZ5046175790
- Civil parish: Niton and Whitwell
- Unitary authority: Isle of Wight
- Ceremonial county: Isle of Wight
- Region: South East
- Country: England
- Sovereign state: United Kingdom
- Post town: VENTNOR
- Postcode district: PO
- Police: Hampshire and Isle of Wight
- Fire: Hampshire and Isle of Wight
- Ambulance: Isle of Wight

Puckaster (also known as Niton Undercliff or Lower Niton) is a hamlet in the civil parish of Niton and Whitwell, on sloping cliffs on the Isle of Wight, England, in the Undercliff region. Puckaster is on the southern coast of the Isle of Wight, south of Niton, between St Catherine's Point and Binnel. It has historical significance.

== Name ==
The name probably means 'the rock or rocky hill haunted by a goblin', from puck (Old English pūca) and torr. There was an unlikely theory by antiquarians that its name came from Latin Port Castra or Portus Castrensis. Its name derives from Puckaster Cove. A farm near Puckaster, Puckwell Farm's name is similar, meaning 'the spring or stream haunted by a goblin', from Old English pūca and wella.

== History ==
Puckaster has historical significance. On 1 July 1675 King Charles II was forced ashore in Puckaster Cove in bad weather and heavy seas, as recorded in the Niton Church Register:

"July the 1st, Anno Domini 1675. Charles II, king of Great Britain, France, and Ireland, etc., came safely ashore at Puckaster, after he had endured a great and dangerous storm at sea."

Vice-Admiral Sir Thomas Hopsonn as an orphan lived in Niton. Seeing the fleet passing offshore he literally ran away to sea, down Puckaster Lane and into a rowing boat, later distinguishing himself, especially at the Battle of Vigo Bay in 1702 and returning to become a local Member of Parliament. He is mentioned by Samuel Smiles in Self Help. The coastline around Puckaster is quite treacherous, leading to the creation of St. Catherine's Oratory on St. Catherine's Down and eventually other lighthouses in the area. Among the other shipwrecks near Puckaster was that of the West Indianman "Three Sisters". The Three Sisters went aground at Puckaster in January 1799. Three of the crew were drowned in this accident.

== Geography ==
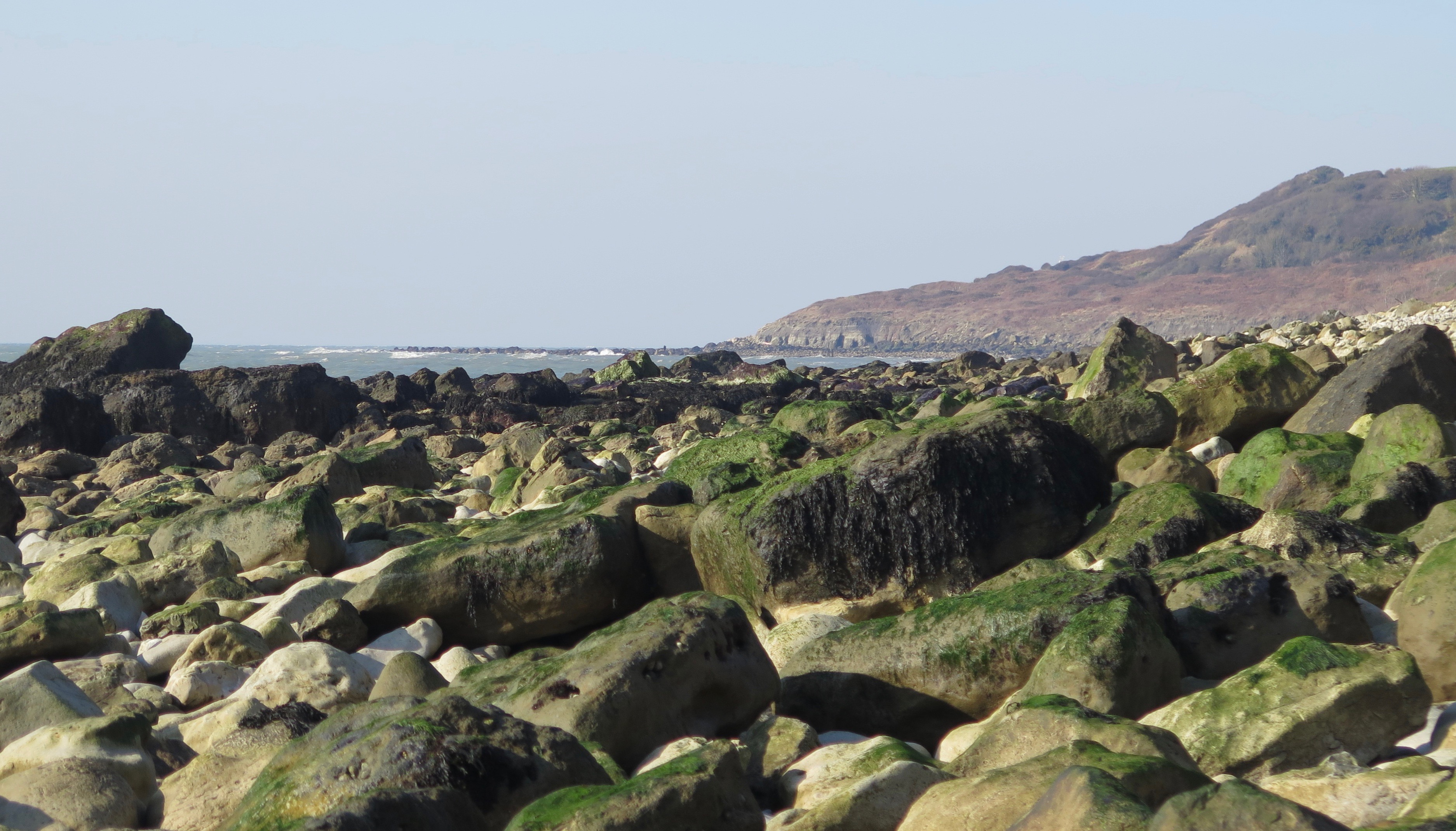
Binnel Bay looking towards Puckaster

Puckaster is part of the Undercliff, a large coastal landslide complex along the southern coastline of the Isle of Wight, and as such is subject to coastal erosion concerns. It is also the home of some rare bees and other unique insects. Its unique climate allows the growth of some plants that are found nowhere else in the British Islands; this was even the subject of a publication by philosopher and economist John Stuart Mill. To this end, Puckaster Farm was purchased in an effort to preserve this area.

Puckaster Cove sits on the coastline beneath the hamlet, immediately east of Reeth Bay and west of Binnel Bay. It is a small remote cove that is now largely inaccessible and dangerous due to landslides. It has a narrow and rocky shoreline with a small shingle beach. The remains of several wooden structures and cleared sand channels can be seen offshore, these originate from the small fishing community that once existed at the cove, which was subsequently destroyed by landslides during the 20th century. As at Reeth Bay the cove is backed by in-situ cliffs of Lower Greensand, with superficial mudflows and landslide debris from the Gault Clay (known locally as 'Blue Slipper') and Upper Greensand.

Puckaster has inspired several renowned paintings and drawings. For example, British painter Edward William Cooke (1811–1880) made a watercolor of Puckaster Cove in 1831. The Brigham Young University Museum of Art owns an anonymous drawn plan of a Puckaster dwelling and a watercolor of a Puckaster cottage. Mrs. W. Bartlett and W. Willis made a well known etching of Puckaster Cove that was published in "Barber's Picturesque Illustrations of the Isle of Wight" in 1845. The Tate Collection includes a drawing by artist Sir David Wilkie (1785–1841) titled, "Sir Willoughby Gordon and his Daughter Julia, Cooking on a Griddle at Puckaster, near Niton, Isle of Wight 1822". Painters L. J. Wood and Richard Henry Nibbs (1816–1893) have also produced notable paintings of Puckaster.

== Famous residents ==
Yacht designer and builder Uffa Fox lived in Puckaster. Prince Philip stayed in Puckaster as a young man when he was learning to sail.

== Mythology ==
Author Cassandra Eason identifies Puckaster as a place which is frequented by fairies in her book, "A Complete Guide to Fairies & Magical Beings".

== Flag ==
Puckaster has its own flag which references the Buddle Inn and the tin trade with Cornwall, the history of smuggling on its coast, St Catherine's Lighthouse, the local landmark and three anchors which reference the Isle of Wight and safe anchorage at the Isle of Wight.
