= Cowes Maritime Museum =

Museum in Cowes, Isle of Wight, England

Coordinates: 50.7601°N 1.2979°W

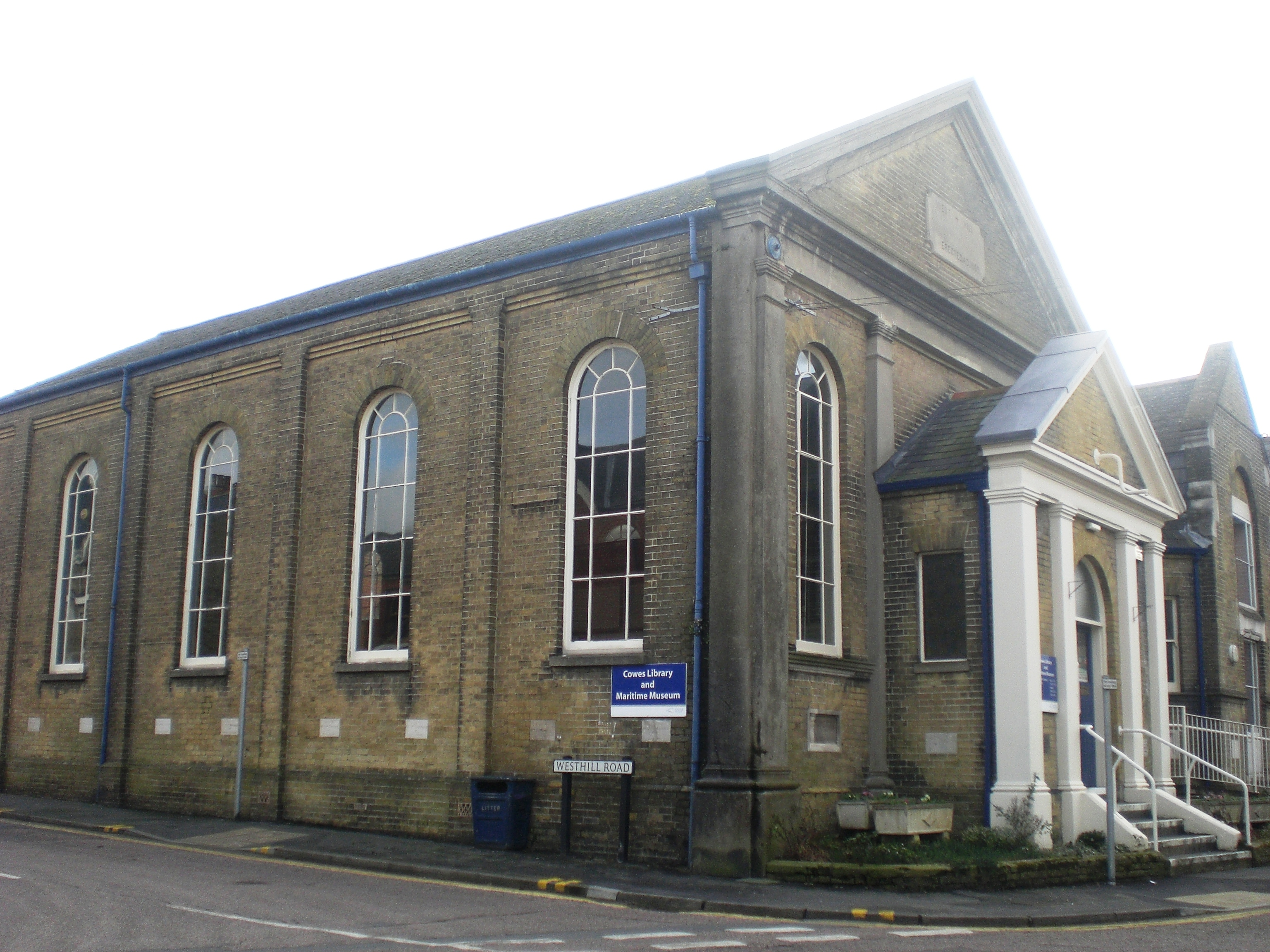
The Cowes Library and Maritime Museum building.

The Cowes Maritime Museum is a local maritime museum in Cowes, Isle of Wight, southern England.

The museum is co-located within Cowes Library. It was started by library staff in the 1970s. It has a small exhibition area that displays model boats from its collection. The museum also has a photographic and paper archive covering yachting and the shipbuilding industry at Cowes. The museum is in Beckford Road in central Cowes and is free of charge.

== See also ==
- List of museums on the Isle of Wight
