= Reeth Bay =

Bay on the Isle of Wight, England

Coordinates: 50°35′N 1°17′W

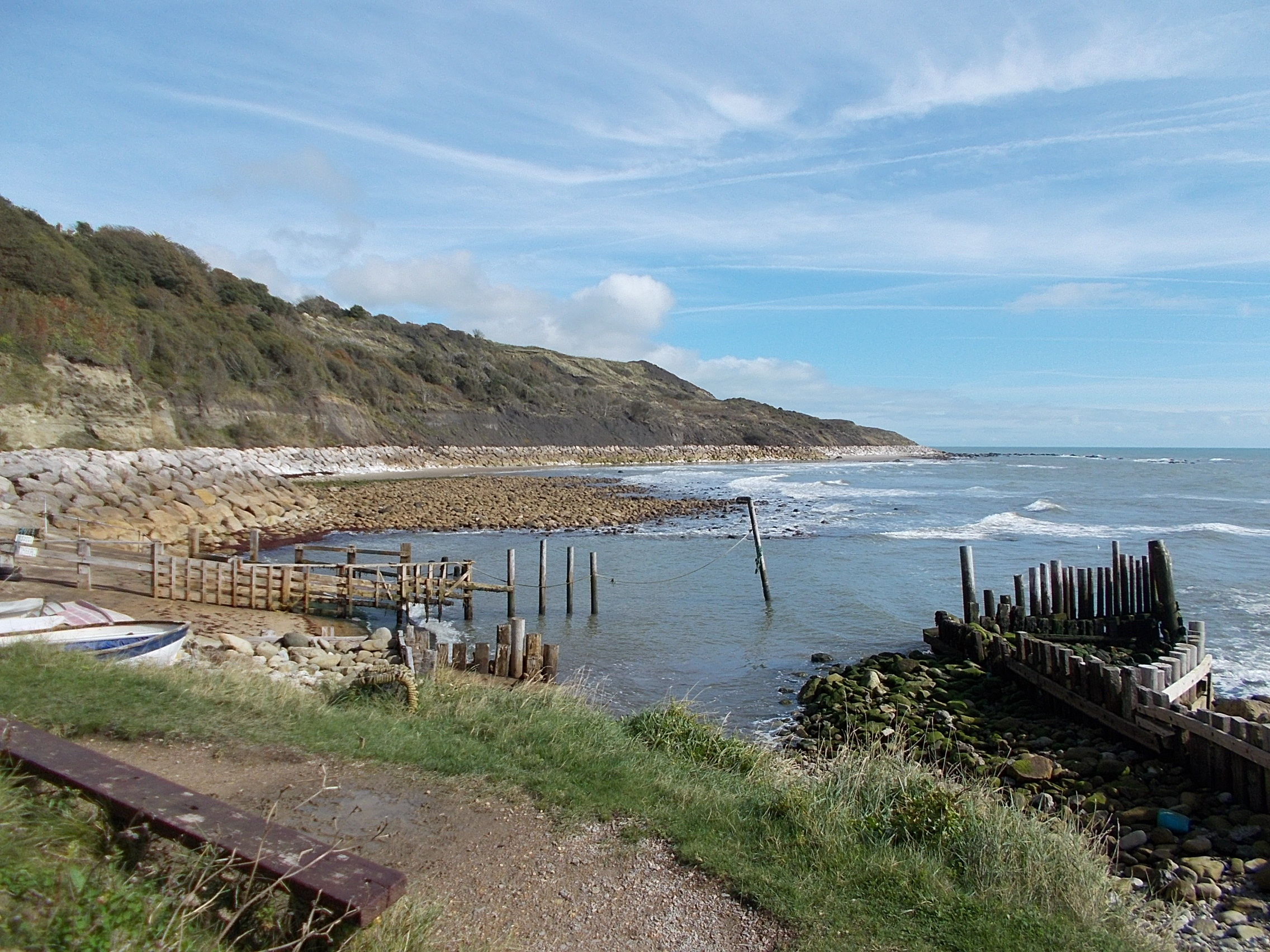
- Reeth Bay

- Location within the Isle of Wight
- Civil parish: Niton and Whitwell
- Ceremonial county: Isle of Wight
- Region: South East
- Country: England
- Sovereign state: United Kingdom

Reeth Bay is a small curved bay on the southernmost tip of the Isle of Wight, England. It lies to the south of the village of Niton with a 1/4-mile-long (0.4 km) shoreline. It faces south out into the English Channel and lies to the east of St. Catherine's Point lighthouse. It is at the centre of a small hamlet called Castlehaven where there is a concrete ramp for launching small craft. The beach is predominantly sand and pebbles. The seabed is a mixture of rocks and mud. The bay is best accessed from the road from Niton that leads down to the bay.

== History ==
There is a 19th-century lifeguard cottage at the bay. The bay used to be a popular tourist destination and had bathing machines during the Victorian era. There also used to be an east-facing slip at Puckaster for fishing boats.
