= Woody Bay, Isle of Wight =

Coordinates: 50°34′54″N 1°14′47″W

Woody Bay
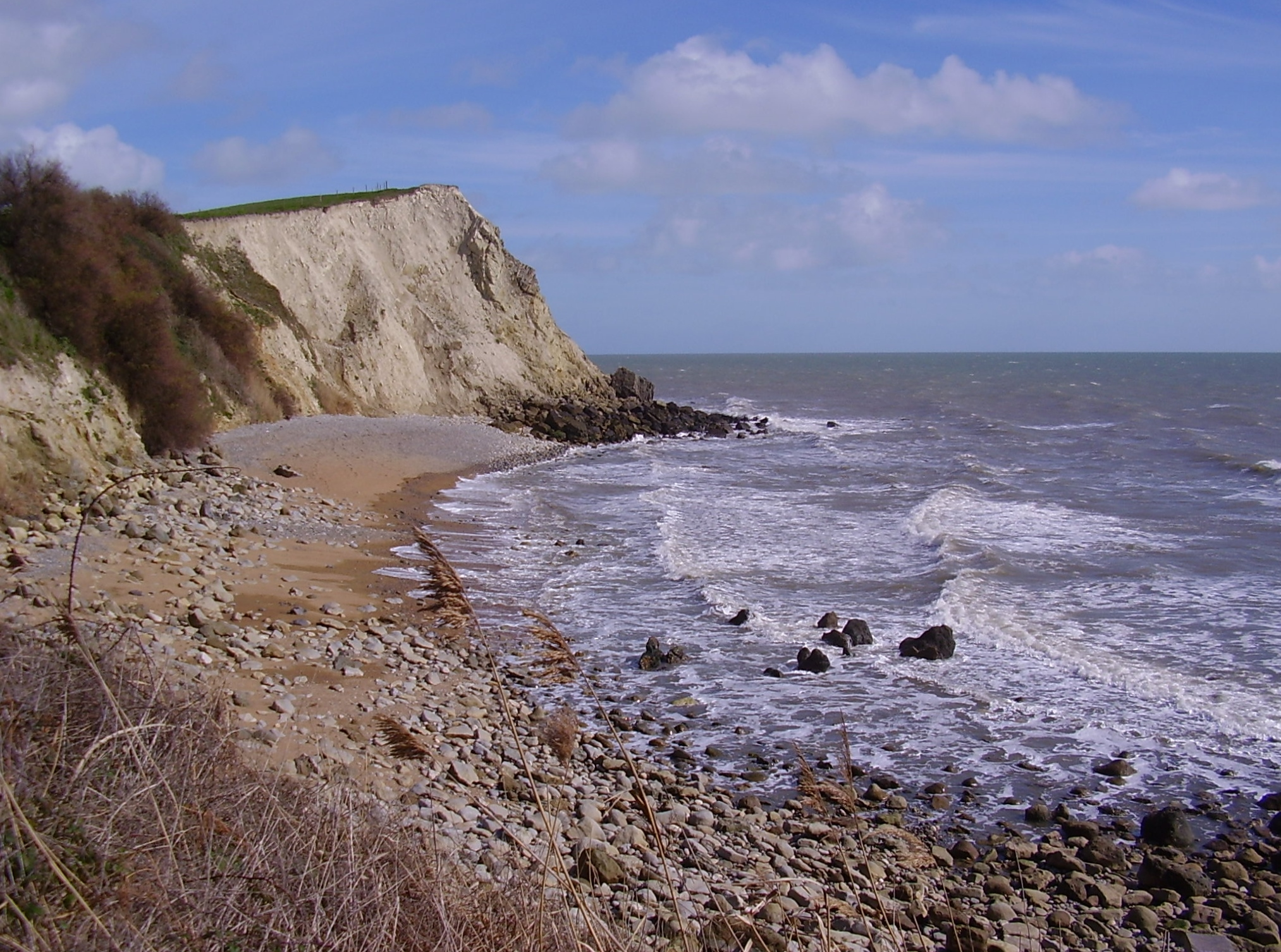
- Woody Bay

- Location within the Isle of Wight
- Civil parish: Ventnor
- Ceremonial county: Isle of Wight
- Region: South East
- Country: England
- Sovereign state: United Kingdom

Woody Bay is a small bay on the south coast of the Isle of Wight, England. It lies along the coastline beneath the village of St. Lawrence. The bay faces south towards the English Channel, its shoreline is 260 yards (240 m) in length.

== Geography ==
The bay has a rocky and exposed shoreline with areas of shingle and a storm beach formed from large pebbles. It is backed by cliffs composed of landslide debris from the Upper Greensand and Chalk. The bay is part of the Undercliff landslide complex, although is a largely stable area of the landslide zone despite recent minor movements.

The Isle of Wight Coastal Path runs along the coast behind the bay and onto Woody Point, where the bay can be best viewed from. A small track runs down from the coastal path on which the bay can be accessed.

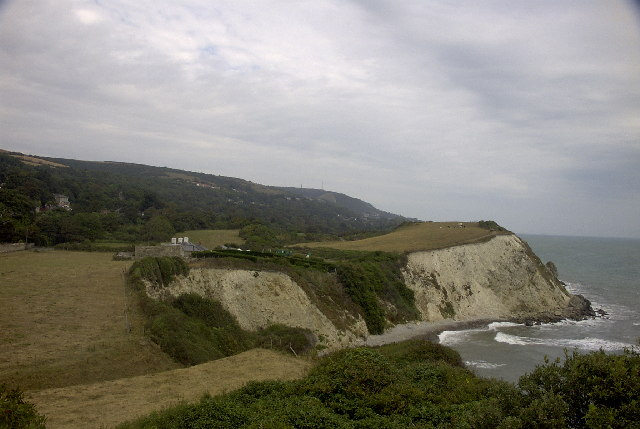
Woody Point

== History ==
During the winters of 2019 and 2020 a large rotational landslide took place in the cliff face in the central section of the bay. Further minor landslides took place in the winter of 2020/2021, driving further landslide debris onto the beach.

Immediately west of Woody Bay is the Sugarloaf, a geological formation formed from a block of tilted and slipped Upper Greensand Formation originally derived from the inland cliff. A footpath leads to the top of the Sugarloaf, with views along the Undercliff coast.

According to author Adrian Searle in his 2016 book Churchill's Last Wartime Secret: the 1943 German raid airbrushed from history Woody Bay is the purported landing site of a covert commando raid by German forces during the Second World War with the aim of retrieving equipment and prisoners from the nearby site of RAF St Lawrence. The landings were then supposedly the subject of a cover up by the British Government. The credibility of the raid however has been challenged, and it is not widely accepted that it was a genuine event.

It was named from the surrounding areas of woodland on and around the cliff.
