= Orchard Bay =

Bay in England

Coordinates: 50°35′12″N 1°13′54″W

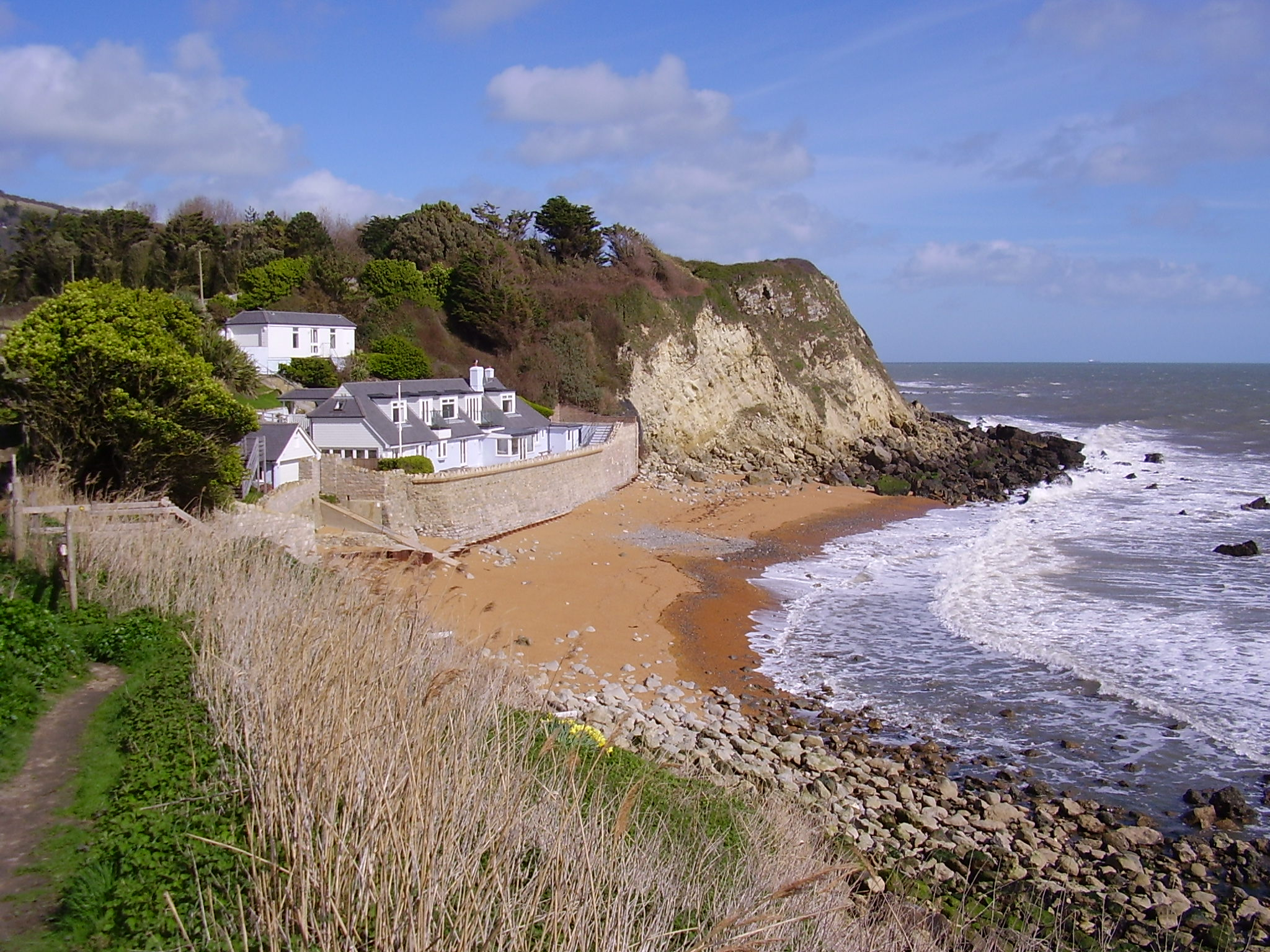
- Orchard Bay

- Location within the Isle of Wight
- Civil parish: Ventnor
- Ceremonial county: Isle of Wight
- Region: South East
- Country: England
- Sovereign state: United Kingdom
- UK Parliament: Isle of Wight East

Orchard Bay is a sandy bay and shingle beach on the south-east coast of the Isle of Wight, England. It lies to the south-west of the Ventnor Botanic Garden and just along the coast west from Steephill Cove. It faces south towards the English Channel, its shoreline is 220 yards (200 m) in length – 65 yards (60 m) of which is beach.

The bay can be accessed by a small footpath at the western end of the bay. The beach is dominated by a large seawall and Orchard House just above the high water mark. Orchard bay House was originally built in 1828 as three coastguard cottages in order to prevent smuggling but was in 1840 acquired for use in smuggling. It is currently let as holiday accommodation.

== Smuggling ==
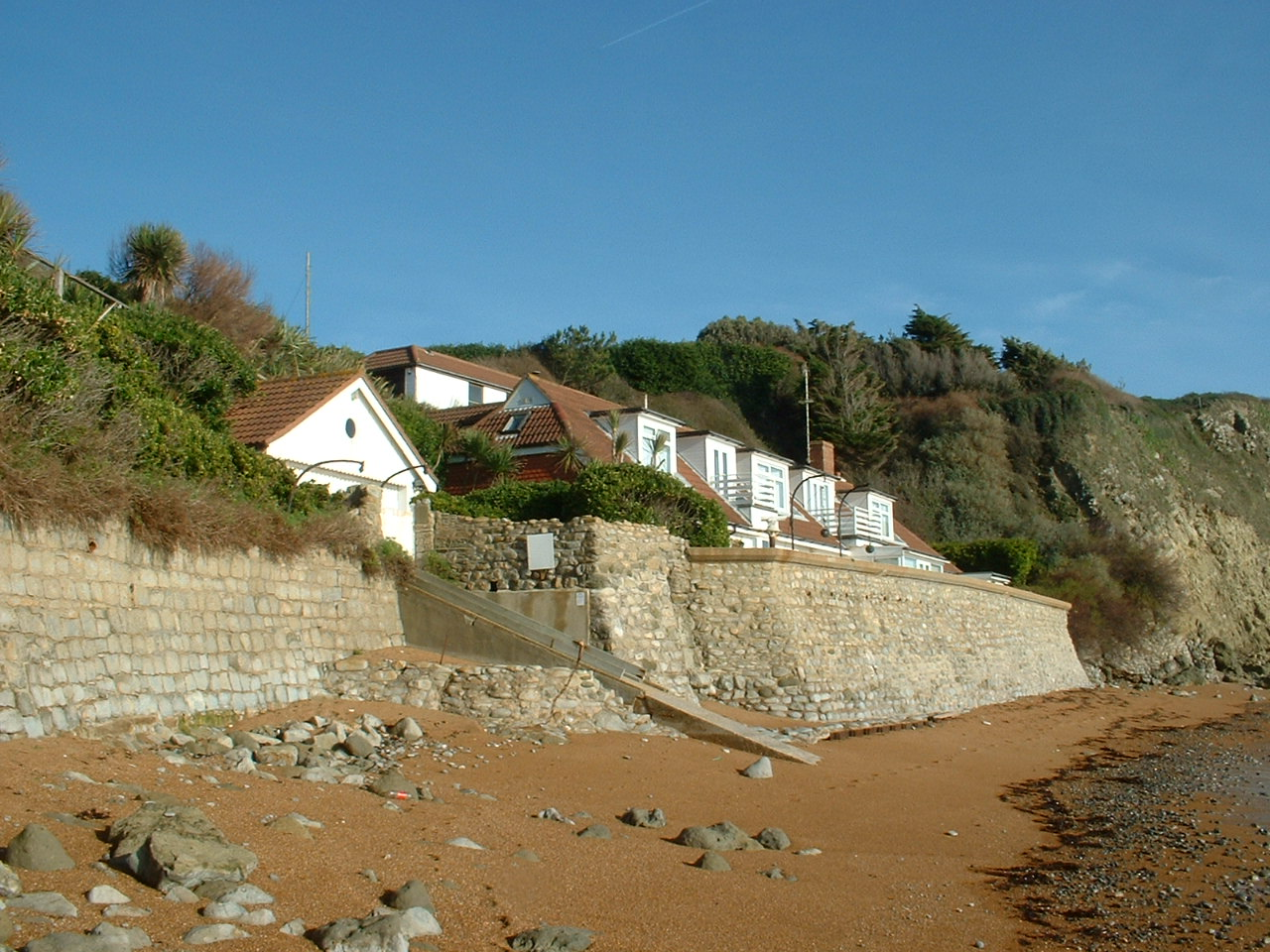
Orchard House, the building involved in the smuggling operation

In 2002, Operation Eyeful resulted in a large seizure of cocaine and eight arrests by officers from HM Customs & Excise, most based at their Shoreham Office. The combined sentence of the eight involved was 141 years imprisonment.

On 8 March, a drug smuggler was jailed for 26 years for leading an operation to bring a record £90 million consignment of cocaine into Britain by yacht. He and five of his accomplices were caught by 150 Customs officers on the Isle of Wight after the smugglers' landing was hampered by storms at the end of a 3,000-mile voyage across the Atlantic from the Caribbean. They had planned to unload 879 lb of cocaine on a private beach at Orchard Bay house near Ventnor, but the weather and the failure of their outboard motor forced them to deposit their cargo on another beach at Woody Bay, about a mile away. They were trapped and arrested after members of the gang had spent hours carrying large bales of cocaine along a treacherous cliff-top path to their destination. Officials knew about the smuggling because the men had been kept under surveillance by excisemen from the Cowes Customs house, among others. I understand that the smuggler had paid £657,000 for the Orchard Bay property. Customs officers on the island had been tipped off that something big was about to happen, and Operation Eyeful, which was a joint investigation with the National Crime Squad, began. It resulted in the successful apprehension of five smugglers.

— Andrew Turner speaking as the then MP for the Isle of Wight, made the following statement to the House of Commons on 22 July 2002.
