= Niton =

Village on the Isle of Wight, England

Coordinates: 50.58687°N 1.2849°W

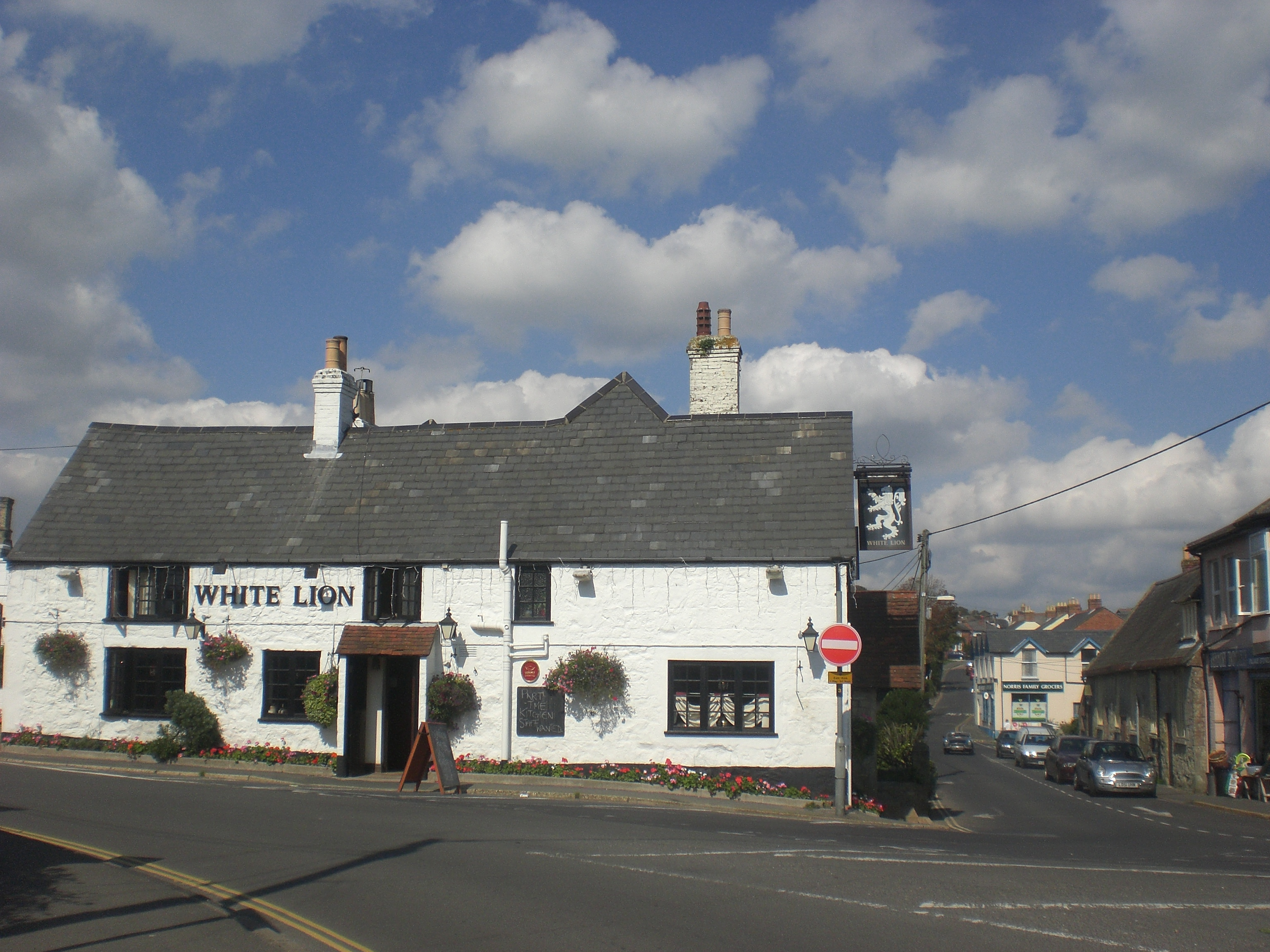
- The White Lion, a pub in the village

- Location within the Isle of Wight
- Population: 2,082 (2011 census including Puckaster)
- OS grid reference: SZ507765
- Civil parish: Niton and Whitwell
- Unitary authority: Isle of Wight
- Ceremonial county: Isle of Wight
- Region: South East
- Country: England
- Sovereign state: United Kingdom
- Post town: VENTNOR
- Postcode district: PO38
- Dialling code: 01983
- Police: Hampshire and Isle of Wight
- Fire: Hampshire and Isle of Wight
- Ambulance: Isle of Wight
- UK Parliament: Isle of Wight West

Niton is a village and former civil parish, now in the parish of Niton and Whitwell, on the Isle of Wight, England. It is west of Ventnor, with a population of 2,082. It has two pubs, several churches, a pottery workshop and shop, a pharmacy, a busy volunteer-run library, a medical centre and two local shops including a post office. The post office includes a pub and café that serves as a local meeting place. The village also offers a primary school with a co-located pre-school and nursery.

== Name ==
The name means 'the new farmstead or settlement', from Old English nīwe (nīge, dialectal form) and tūn. Nyton in West Sussex has the same origin. Niton was formerly known as Crab Niton, named after the abundance of crabs in the sea.

1086 (Domesday Book): Neeton

1155-1158: Neuton

1189-1204: Nitona

1193-1217: Niweton

1305: Nyton

== Geography ==
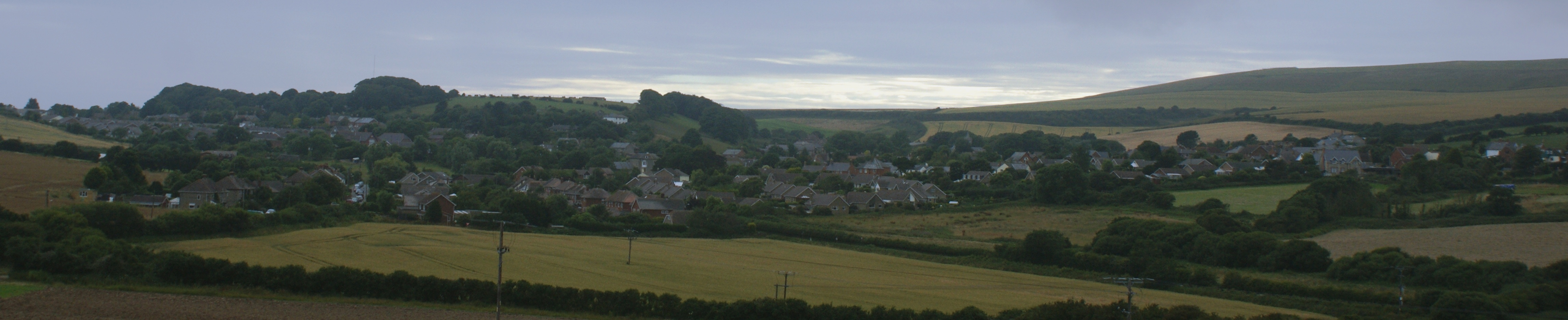
Panorama over Niton

Niton village is split in half by a break in the inner cliff of the Undercliff, through which passes the main road. Upper Niton lies in a hollow and is set around a crossroads.

The lower part of the village, below the inner cliff and above Reeth Bay, is known as Niton Undercliff, and was a small fishing hamlet up until the 19th century. This part of Niton then flourished in Victorian times due to the popularity of Ventnor as a health resort, and many mansions and holiday cottages were built there.

Mount Cleves House was originally constructed in the late 1700s, and substantially remodelled in the early 1800s. Its residents included a Mr Kirkpatrick who owned the Isle of Wight Bank at the time and the owner of the Mortimer Foundry in Newport.

The road along the Undercliff continues east towards Ventnor, but a major landslip in February 2014 has closed it to vehicular traffic between Niton and Ventnor, although it remains open for walkers and riders. The Undercliff at Niton includes the most southerly point of the Isle of Wight, St. Catherine's Point and St. Catherine's Lighthouse. That is also where the Navtex transmitting station is located.

The source of the Eastern Yar is in the parish, just north of the village.

Niton together with Whitwell is a civil parish.

== History ==
Prehistoric lithic implements dating to the lower Palaeolithic constitute the oldest evidence of occupation of the area by hominids at some point in the early to mid Pleistocene. These are namely Acheulean handaxes, that have been discovered on the Undercliff coastline beneath the village. Later prehistoric findspots show evidence of Mesolithic and Neolithic activity.

Bronze Age round barrows are situated at several points on St Catherine's Down. These were used as burial monuments and perhaps territorial markers by Bronze Age communities. The historical parish boundary with Chale to the north follows these barrows, tentatively suggesting this is an ancient boundary between neighbouring communities that has persisted. Further Bronze Age evidence has been found at St Catherine's Point.

Close to Niton is the sheltered and remote Puckaster Cove, which was once proposed to have been used by Greek and Phoenician traders during the Bronze Age. Although this is not widely accepted and little evidence exists to support the claim.

Evidence of Roman and Iron Age occupation has been found at St Catherine's Point, which may have been the site of a Roman military outpost, most likely a beacon or signal station. Some of these finds include middens, with one containing the skeletal remains of a young girl.

On 1 April 1933 the parish of Whitwell was merged with Niton. On 1 December 1980, the new parish was renamed to "Niton & Whitwell". In 1931 the civil parish of Niton (prior to the merge) had a population of 868.

== Niton lighthouse ==
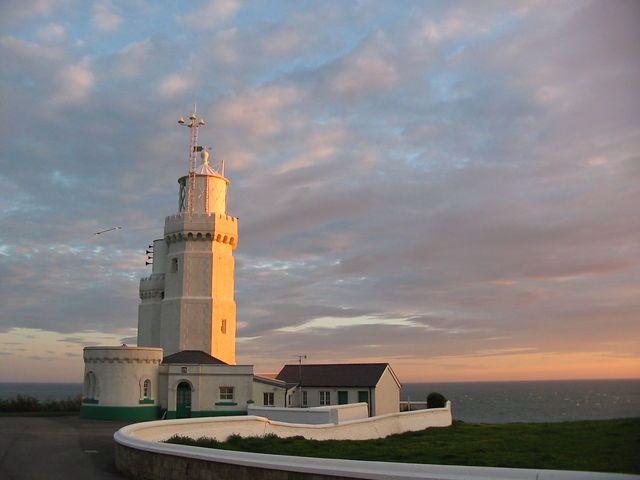
St Catherine's Lighthouse

St. Catherine's Lighthouse was bombed in World War II, receiving a direct hit on the boiler house that killed three lighthouse keepers, Principal Keeper R T Grenfell, Assistant Keeper C. Tompkins and Assistant Keeper W.E. Jones. The lighthouse itself was only slightly damaged, its lens only being chipped.

Catherine's Lighthouse was automated in 1997 with the keepers leaving the lighthouse on 30 July.[1]

The 1904 optic remained in use until being removed as part of modernisation and safety works in 2021.

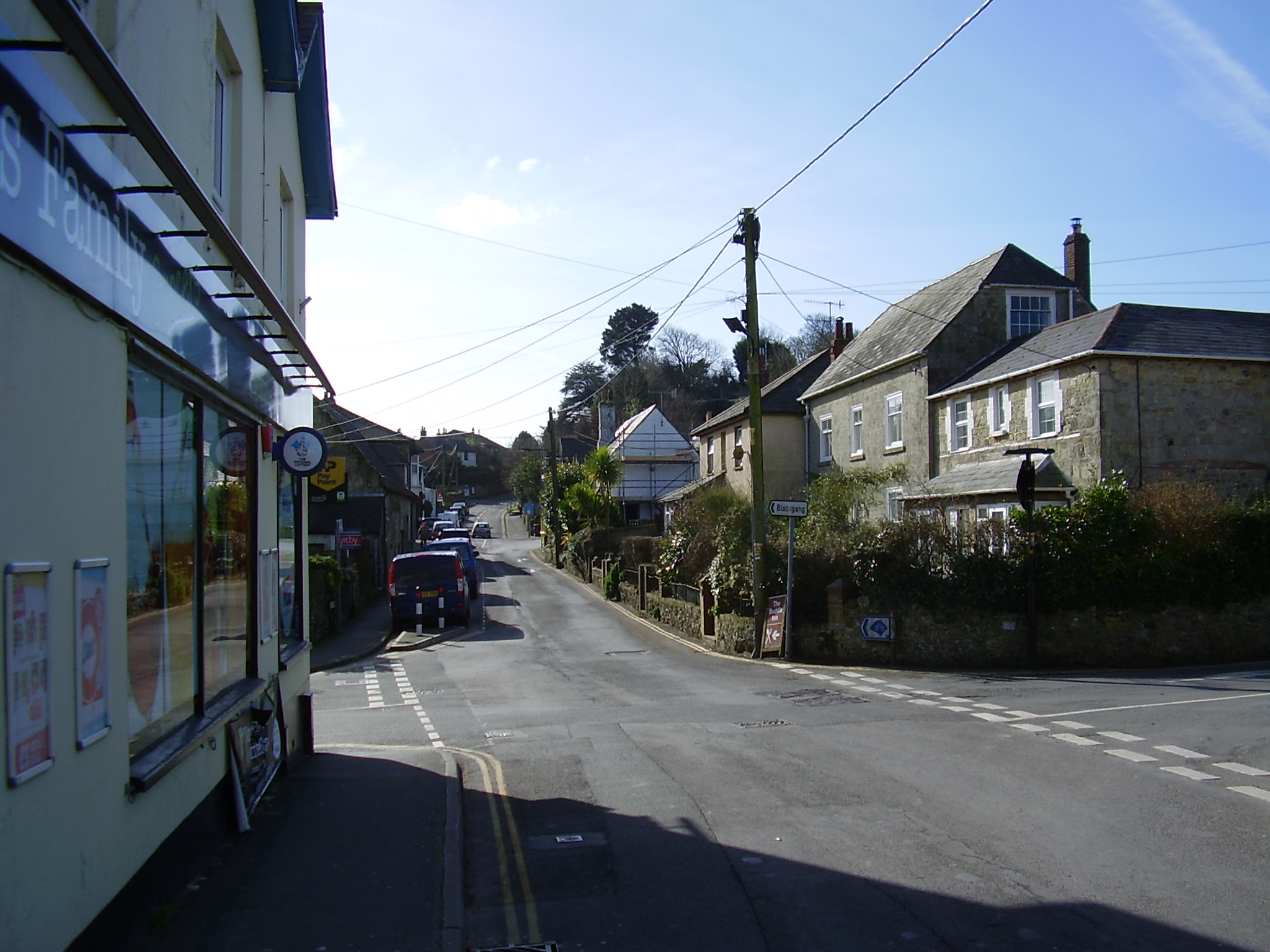
Niton village

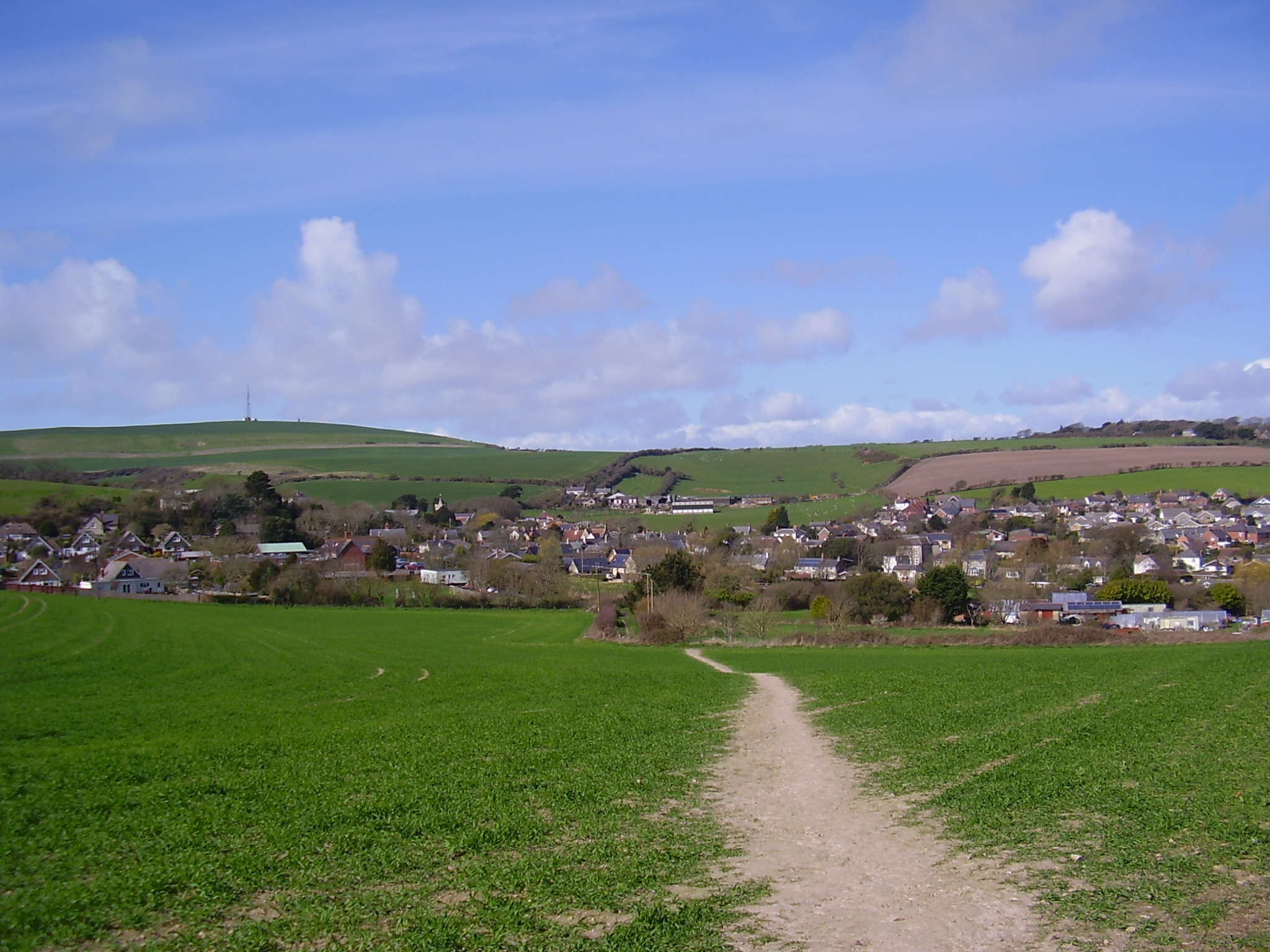
Niton, with St Catherine's Down behind

== Radio ==
Marconi used Knowles Farm in Niton for radio experiments, when he was living on the island in the late 1890s and early 1900s. In January 1901, he transmitted radio signals a record 186 miles from there to his Lizard Radio Telegraph Station at the southern tip of Cornwall. The farm has a stone into which is cut the inscription, "This is to commemorate that Marconi set up a wireless experimental station here in A.D. 1900". While in Niton, Marconi stayed at the Royal Sandrock Hotel, which no longer exists.

A ship-to-shore radio station was established in 1900, and Niton Radio (callsign GNI) was maintained as a coastal radio station known to yachtmasters. It was featured in a British Telecom International information film. It finally closed, along with the rest of the coastal radio network, in 1997. The Navtex transmitter at St. Catherine's Lighthouse is still in operation as of 2013 (Navtex is a shore-to-ship service). For the purpose of extended Shipping forecasts, the Met Office uses Niton as the name of the forecast area covering the Atlantic from FitzRoy, North to Irish Sea and East to Thames.

== Transport ==
Southern Vectis bus route 6 serves the village on its way between Newport and Ventnor. During the summer, the Island Coaster also runs through the village.

== Notable people ==
Penrhyn Grant Jones, British Consul, China and Assistant Judge of the British Supreme Court for China grew up in Niton.
