= Chink (Isle of Wight) =

Rock cleft in Ventnor, Isle of Wight, England

Coordinates: 50.6068°N 1.1800°W

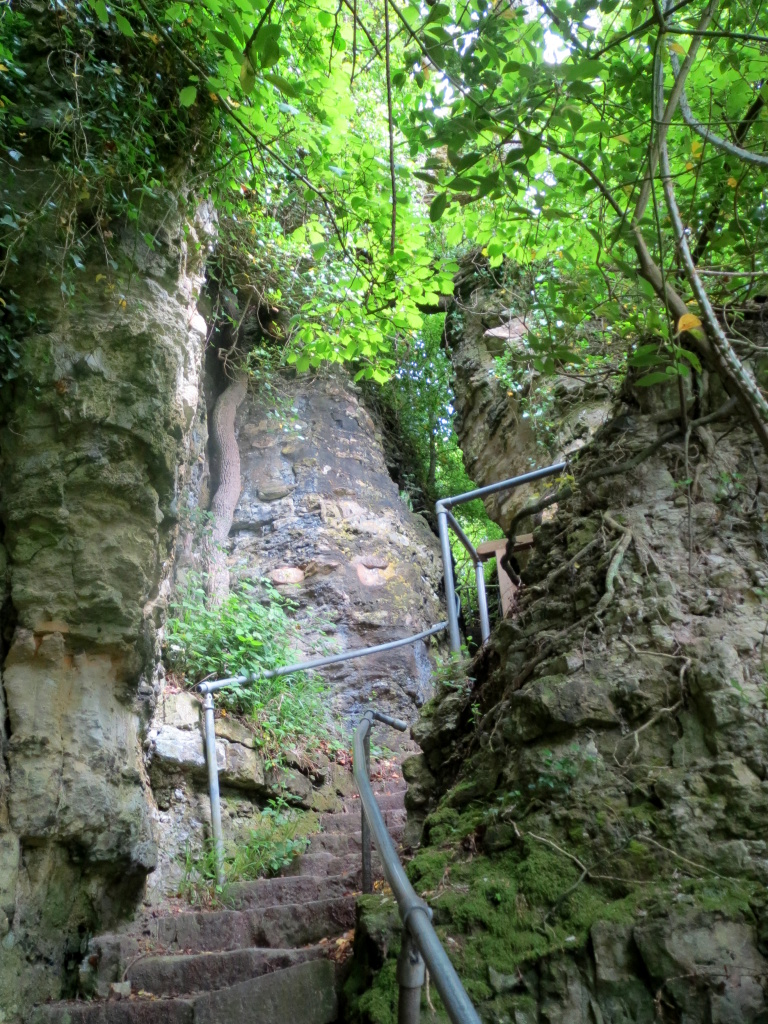
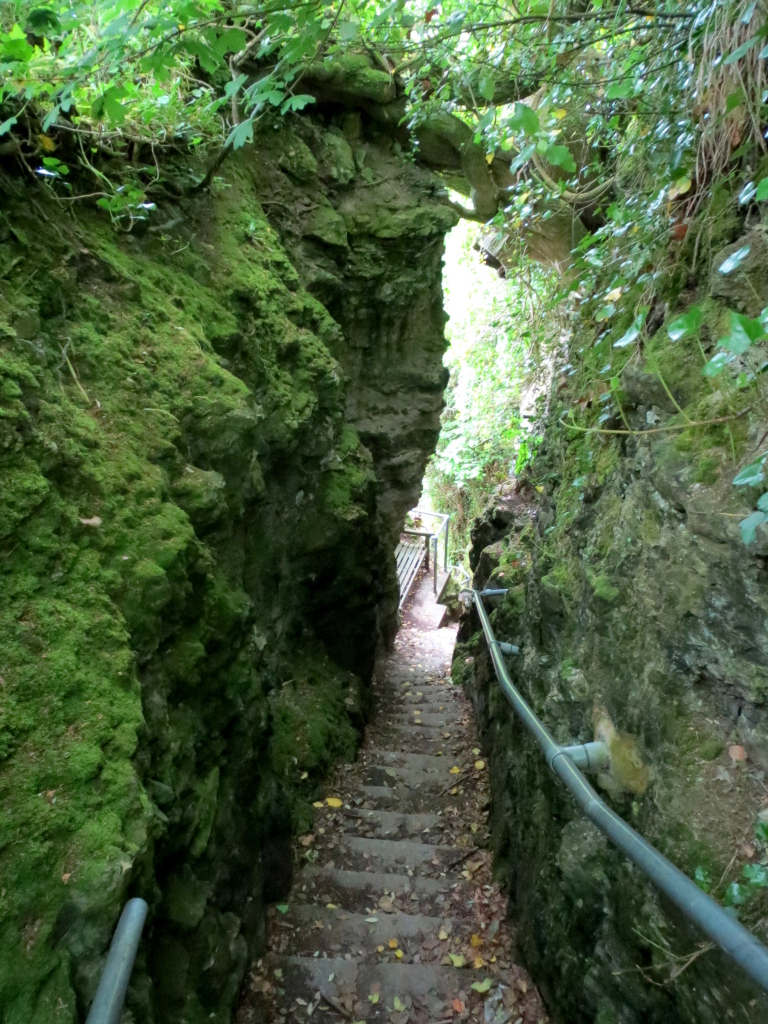
Ascending (left) and descending views of the Chink
The Chink, on the Isle of Wight

The Chink is a scenic rock cleft between Bonchurch and Luccombe, Isle of Wight, with steps descending from St Boniface Down to the Bonchurch Landslips below.

Its upper end is at the northern end of clifftop parkland accessed from the Leeson Road (A3055) car park, where there is a Southern Vectis bus route 3 stop.

The Chink was known in Victorian times as part of the development of the Bonchurch Landslips as a picturesque woodland walk.

One of several such paths with carved steps connecting the clifftop to the Isle of Wight Undercliff, it follows a joint through the Upper Greensand crags capping the cliffs above the Landslip. The path continues down through the Landslip as footpath V65, which joins the coastal path V65A at its foot.

The Chink survived the disastrous December 2023 landslide, as it was located just to the north of the worst-affected area. However, the path through it is now closed due to safety concerns, as are all other paths through the landslip area that were not completely obliterated.

A similar rock cleft, the better-known Devil's Chimney, lies about 200 yards south.
