= A3055 road =

Road on the Isle of Wight

Coordinates: 50.61658°N 1.36261°W

A3055

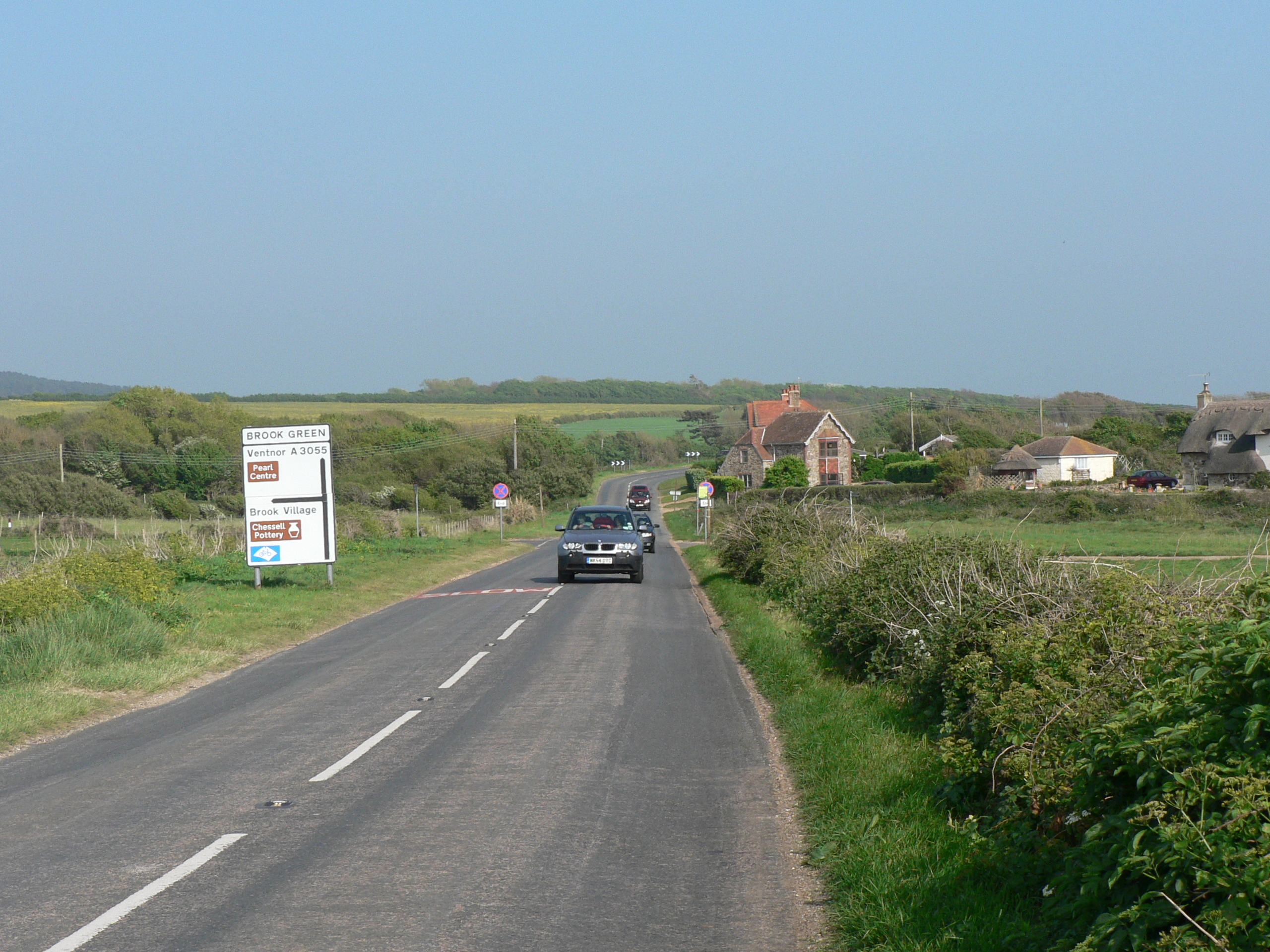
- Military Road at Brook. This is the end of the clearway section, as denoted by the signs near the junction. The destination on the sign is Ventnor: despite the fact the road goes to Ryde, motorists travelling there would have a shorter journey via Brook Village and Newport

Major junctions
- North end: Ryde
- A3054 A3020 A3056 A3054
- West end: Totland

Location
- Country: United Kingdom
- Constituent country: England

Road network
- Roads in the United Kingdom; Motorways; A and B road zones

The A3055 is an A-Class Road on the Isle of Wight in Southern England. It forms the Southern portion of the circular around-the-Island A-class loop, the northern section being the A3054. The stretch along the south-west coast of the Island is formed by the Military Road.

Because of the road's relatively short length, there are no confirmatory signs with distances, although on a few direction signs at junctions there are distances to the next town. The final destination of the road (Freshwater/Totland or Ryde), in common with most UK roads, is not signed along the whole length of the route. As well as fitting with national practice, this is also because anybody wishing to travel from Totland to Ryde by road would do so via the North coast A3054, as it is much more direct.

Since 2014, the road has been permanently blocked to motor vehicles by a landslide on Undercliff Drive at a point west of St Lawrence, making the through-route between Ventnor and Niton unavailable, with diversion via Whitwell. As well as problems on Undercliff Drive, various other landslips and coastal erosion issues have affected the road in recent history, such as at Brook and at Leeson Road in Ventnor, which have resulted in sections being closed for repair, or on safety grounds, on several occasions.

== Military Road ==
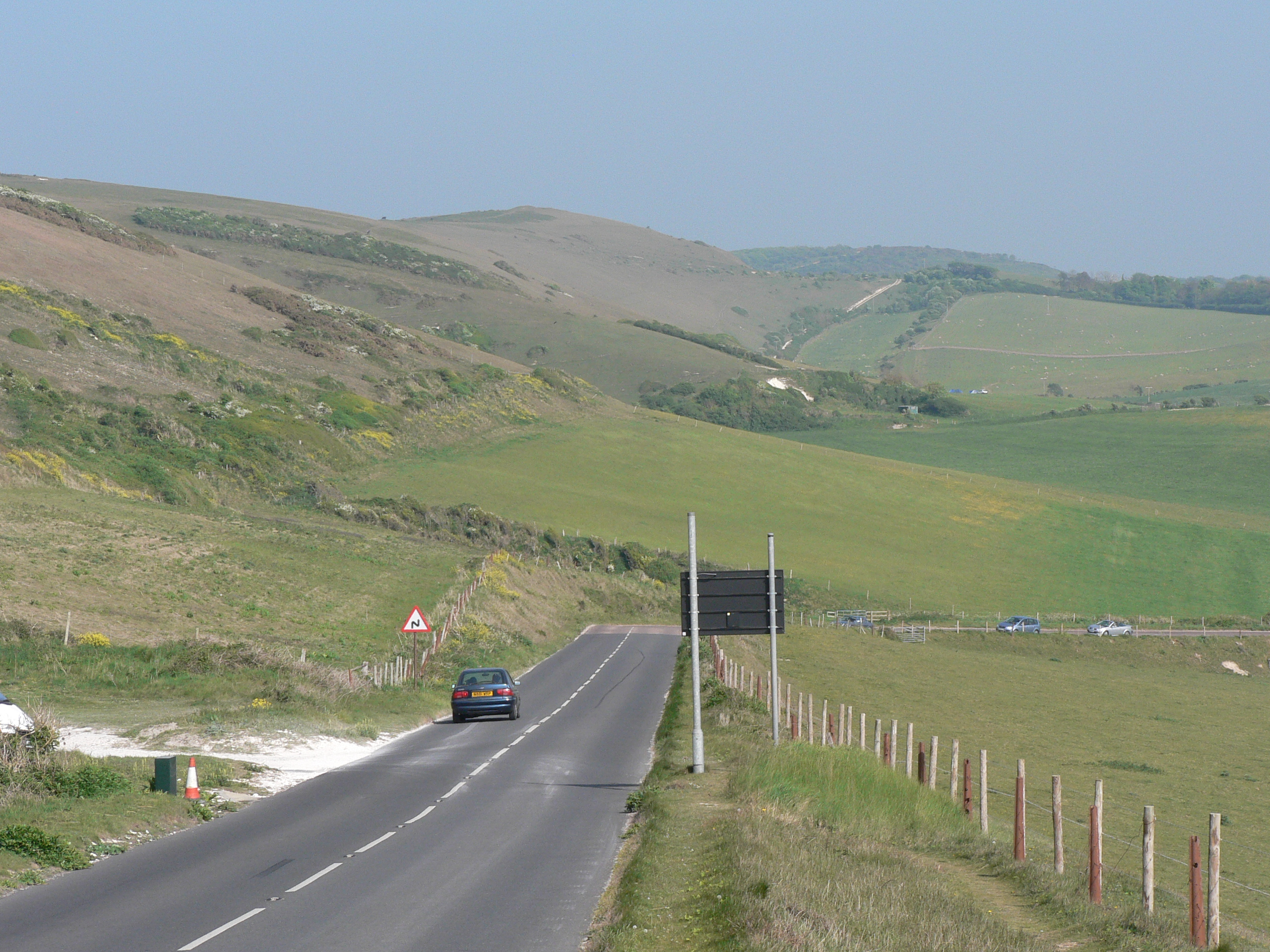
Military Road near Compton Farm (ahead). Automatically in the event of a landslide, or manually in very poor weather, the sign (to the right here) can be illuminated to close the road at this vulnerable point.

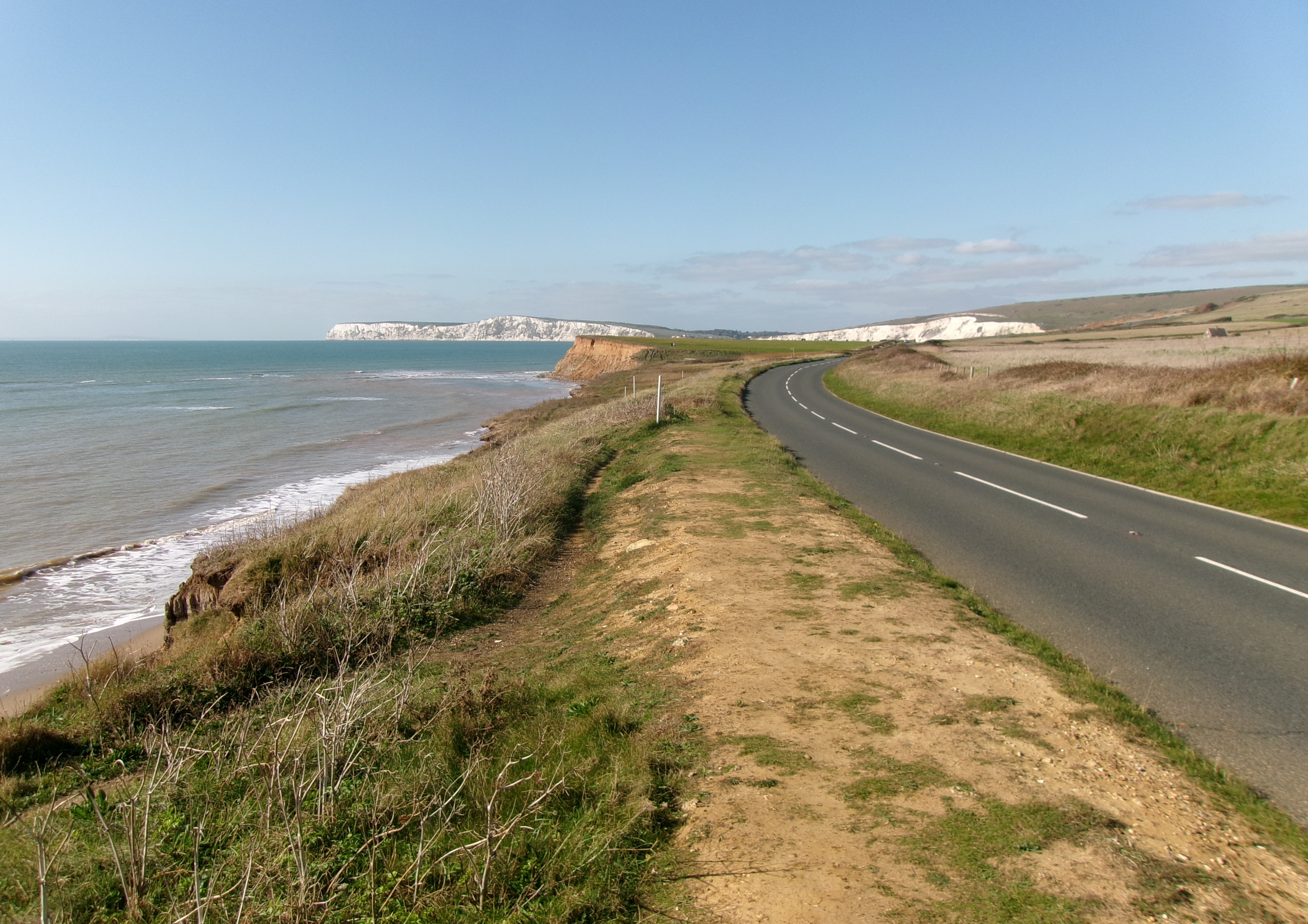
Military Road near Brook, showing encroachment of coastal erosion (2025)

The Military Road is the section of the A3055 regional coast road on the Isle of Wight which starts at Chale in the East and ends at Freshwater Bay in the West. The road has had to be in part relocated and repaired due to coastal erosion at various times since it was built in the late nineteenth century, and this continues today.

The original Military Road was constructed as part of a defence network in about 1860 and remained as a private gated road for about 70 years. It served as a link between forts and barracks and fluctuated between private and military use with private rights vested in the Seely family. In 1930 or thereabouts, the landowner Sir Charles Seely donated what was then a narrow track to the Isle of Wight Council for public use. The original track was vulnerable to erosion and a new road was constructed further inland. Some vestiges of the original track are still visible along the coast from Shepherds Chine to the north west of the slumped area. The construction of the new road took place in the early 1930 with the formal opening of the last section in March 1936.

The road from Chale to Niton was built as a diversionary inland route following the collapse of the previous coastal road between Niton and Blackgang in 1928. It is of similar construction and mostly from the same time period to the stretch to the west of Chale which was re-built and upgraded at this time. This length of road is not usually understood to be covered by the term 'Military Road' and its name on street maps and signs is different.

The section from Brook to Freshwater Bay is a clearway, so stopping on this section is only permitted at the five car parking areas, of which one is free, and the rest are operated with a charge to those who are not members of the National Trust. Along the rest of the route, there is no such restriction, but most motorists choose only to stop in designated car parks.

=== Erosion and landslips ===
In the summer of 2009, the Isle of Wight Council was warned that cliff slippage was endangering the road, and, as of January 2010, portions of the cliff were only 10 metres (33 ft) from the road. The harsh weather over winter 2009-10 caused a large number of landslides. By February 2010, another landslip on the section between Brook and Hanover car park brought the top of the cliff to about 5 metres from the edge of the road. The coastal path was lost, and the council erected traffic barriers at one side of the road to alert drivers.

A further landslide, on the same section, on 23 February 2010, brought the top of the cliff to virtually the edge of the road. The road was reduced to single file, with traffic light control. Since then various meetings of the Isle of Wight Council have included discussion of the road's future. One view has been that the road is unrepairable, and should be closed, while parking and turning areas should be created at both ends. More recently the possibility has been discussed of diverting the road and rebuilding as part of the county's refurbishment of all its roads under a Private finance initiative. The section of destroyed road was repaired, and a diversion has yet to be implemented.

== Undercliff Drive ==
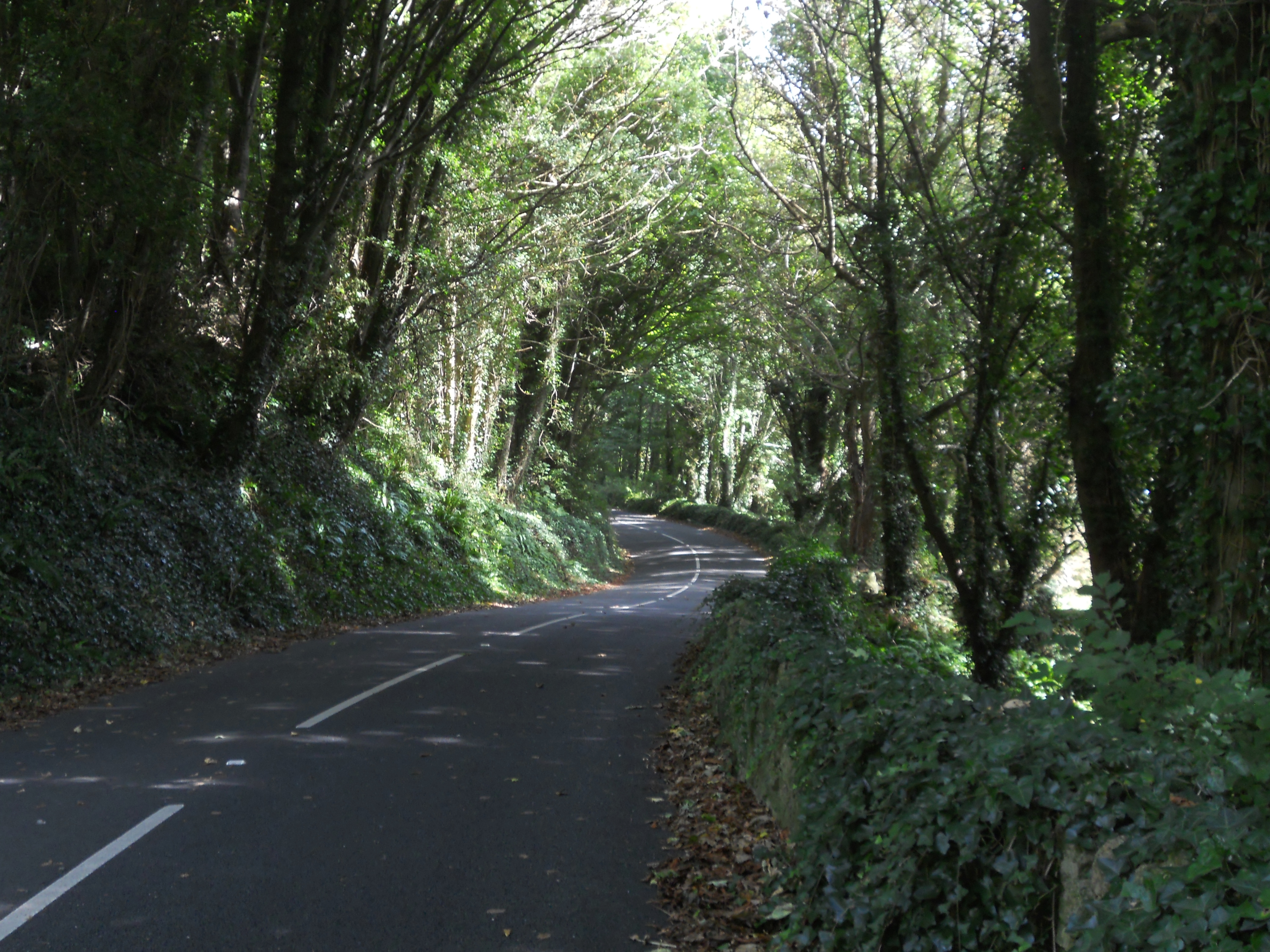
Undercliff Drive between Niton and St Lawrence

Undercliff Drive is the segment of the A3055 that runs the length of the Isle of Wight Undercliff between Niton and Ventnor. Due to the unusual geology of the area, with significant clay layers, it has long been vulnerable to weathering and underground watercourses causing erosion in the unstable landscape, with various plans for a long-term stabilisation of the land (including the road) drawn up in the first decade of the 21st century, not without controversy. Allegations of irregularities regarding the contract to rebuild the road following a landslip in 2001, which could have amounted to "criminal activity or public sector corruption" were investigated by Hampshire Police in November 2007, several senior officers at Isle of Wight Council were suspended, and John Lawson, the Deputy Chief Executive of the council was sacked after his resignation was refused. By March 2008 police determined there was insufficient evidence to continue their investigations. However, an internal investigation by Isle of Wight Council concluded that the council had broken both its own constitution, European Union and UK law by awarding a multimillion-pound contract without any tendering process. The scheme, which was abandoned by mid-November 2007, had already cost almost £3 million and was projected to cost more than three times its original estimate of £5.6 million.

Another scheme designed to stabilise the road was started by Island Roads in 2013 as part of their Private Finance Initiative deal with the local council, at the same time as works on a similar issue near Yarmouth. However, a significant landslip occurred on 8 February 2014 after an "unusually heavy and prolonged rain" while these works were in progress, leading to the indefinite closure of the road to traffic, effectively cutting the numbered route into two separate sections. It has since come to light that Geotechnical Design Reports drawn up before the work began had identified the risk of geological failures overwhelming the work site as very high, and specifically noted that this was likely to depend on future rainfall and groundwater, but proposed no mitigation measures to counteract this problem. When this issue was highlighted, some people began to question why the works had been planned to take place during the wettest part of the year. The military helped to evacuate several homes, at least one of which suffered structural damage and was declared unsafe. Official proposals, costed at £6–20 million have been to rebuild a replacement road for access to and from the West, with only a bridleway for access to the East, but these plans have been repeatedly subject to criticism. Despite the council announcing that a new access road would be built by the summer of 2015, there have been further delays. Initial works were quickly halted when it became clear they had been carried out on land of unclear ownership in a Site of Special Scientific Interest without permission or consultation with statutory body Natural England. Local residents, who had been cut off from the road network for eight months, rebuilt a road access themselves in October 2014, although there were concerns that this unofficial repair encroached onto the Site of Special Scientific Interest, might pollute the environment and the road itself could be dangerous, so this was cordoned off by safety inspectors. An agreement allowing the transfer of land between the council and a local wildlife trust was not agreed until September 2015 and a further year-long delay was expected when it became clear that a survey would be needed of the local bat population, which was not due to be completed until August 2016. However, in February 2016, two years after the landslide, Island Roads confirmed that there was no evidence of bat habitation in the majority of the trees which would be affected by the planned works. The short-term plan is now to construct a realigned road to a turning area for vehicles at each end side of the major slip, but there are still problems with groundwater levels which may delay construction. The road was lodged for planning permission in April 2016, and the council expected works to be completed between June and September.

== Leeson Road ==
Leeson Road, named after the 19th century Bonchurch resident Henry Beaumont Leeson, is the segment of the A3055 that runs from Ventnor, at the foot of St Boniface Down, along the clifftop above Bonchurch, the Bonchurch Landslips and the Devil's Chimney. The upper section of the road was closed from 10 December 2023 until 1 December 2024 for repair works following a major cliff fall.
