= Undercliff (Isle of Wight) =

Region of the Isle of Wight, England

Coordinates: 50°35′9.85″N 1°14′28″W

The Isle of Wight Undercliff

The Undercliff, Isle of Wight, England is a tract of semi-rural land, around 5 miles (8.0 km) long by 0.25–0.5 miles (0.40–0.80 km) wide, skirting the southern coast of the island from Niton to Bonchurch. Named after its position below the escarpment that backs this coastal section, its undulating terrain comprises a mix of rough pasture, secondary woodland, parkland, grounds of large isolated houses, and suburban development. Its sheltered south-facing location gives rise to a microclimate considerably warmer than elsewhere on the island. Although inhabited, the Undercliff is an area prone to landslips and subsidence, with accompanying loss of property over time. Settlements along the Undercliff, from west to east, are: Puckaster, St Lawrence, Steephill, the town of Ventnor, and Bonchurch.

== Geology ==
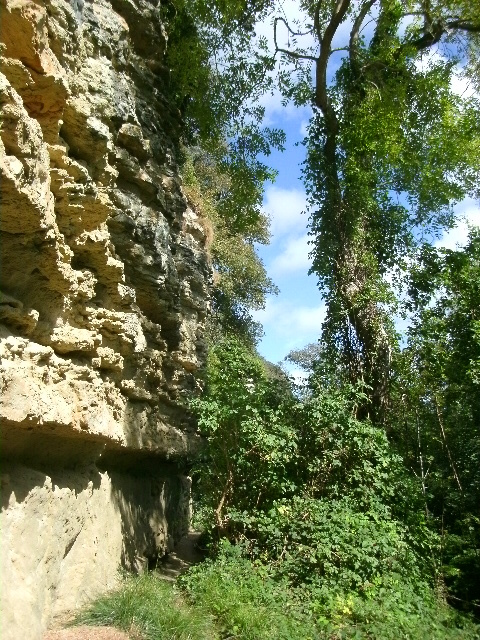
Upper Greensand crags backing the Undercliff, Isle of Wight, above Steephill.

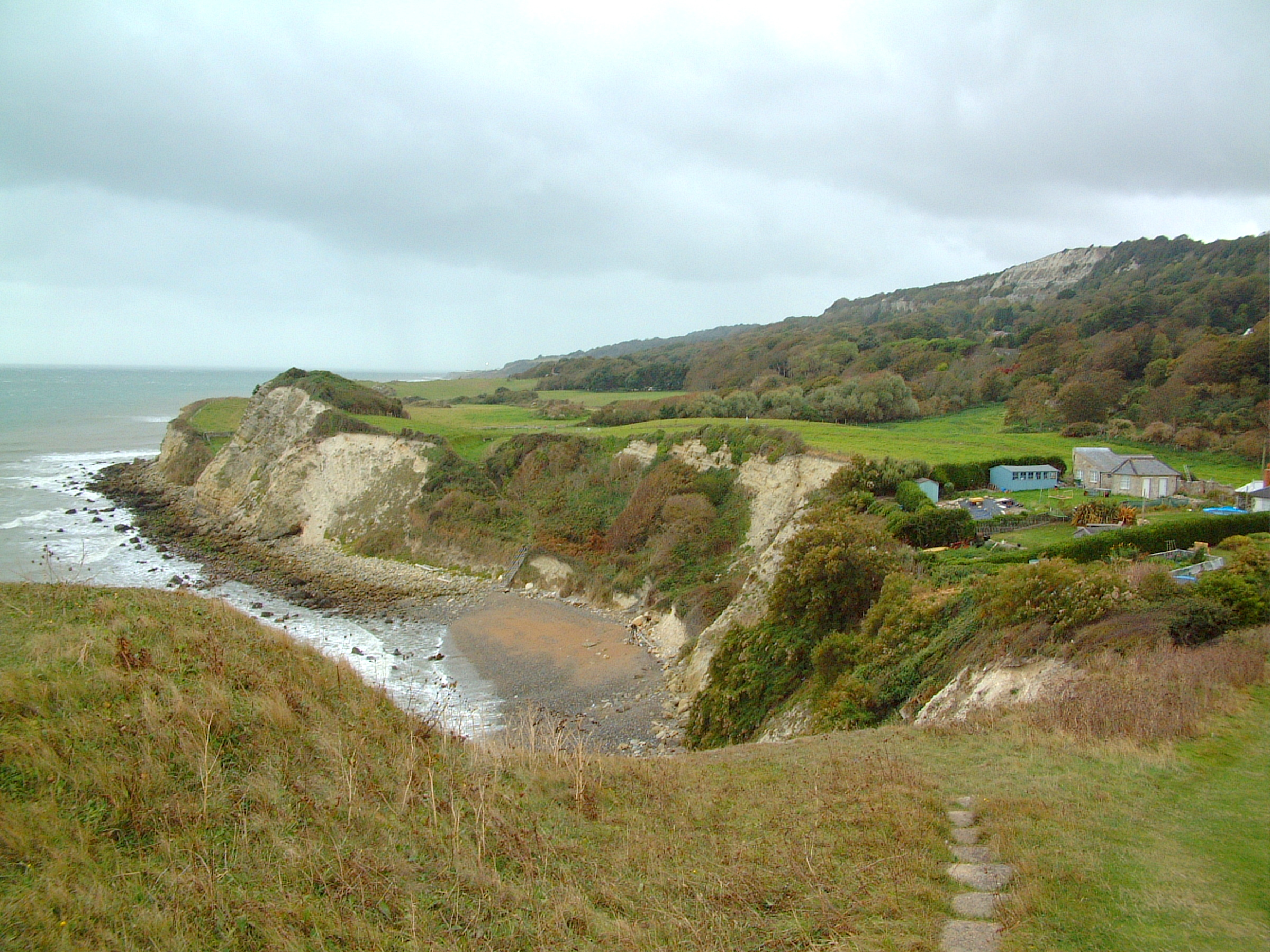
The Undercliff, Isle of Wight, looking westward at Woody Bay

The Undercliff is a landslide complex in Cretaceous soft rocks, a bench of slipped clays and sands above a low sea-cliff, backed by higher (100 metres (330 ft)) Upper Greensand and Chalk cliffs. The largest urban landslide complex in northern Europe, it dates from two main phases of landslides after the last Ice age: 8000–4500 years and 2500–1800 years ago. It is flanked by highly active landslip zones that have seen major slides over the past two centuries: the Blackgang landslip at the west, and the Bonchurch Landslips at the east. The main section is more stable, though there are ongoing concerns over coastal erosion, further slippage and subsidence. The main through road, Undercliff Drive, was disrupted by a mud slide near St Lawrence in 2001, requiring 18 months to build a new road section and in 2014 further erosion after heavy rain fell and the road was under repair, leading to more damage, and nine houses being evacuated.

Interactions between the heavy chalk-based rocks of St. Boniface Down, the highest chalk downland on the Isle of Wight, and the softer rocks of the Undercliff below Ventnor means that subsequent erosion has caused Upper Ventnor, or Lowtherville, to gradually start moving towards the cliff edge, in a feature referred to residents as 'The Graben'. This rapid geological change in terrain is also responsible for necessitating the town's distinctive routes in and out of Ventnor, which feature panoramic views across Sandown Bay to the north-east, and the English Channel to the south. Ventnor's microclimate is also created by the shelter of St. Boniface Down.

== History ==
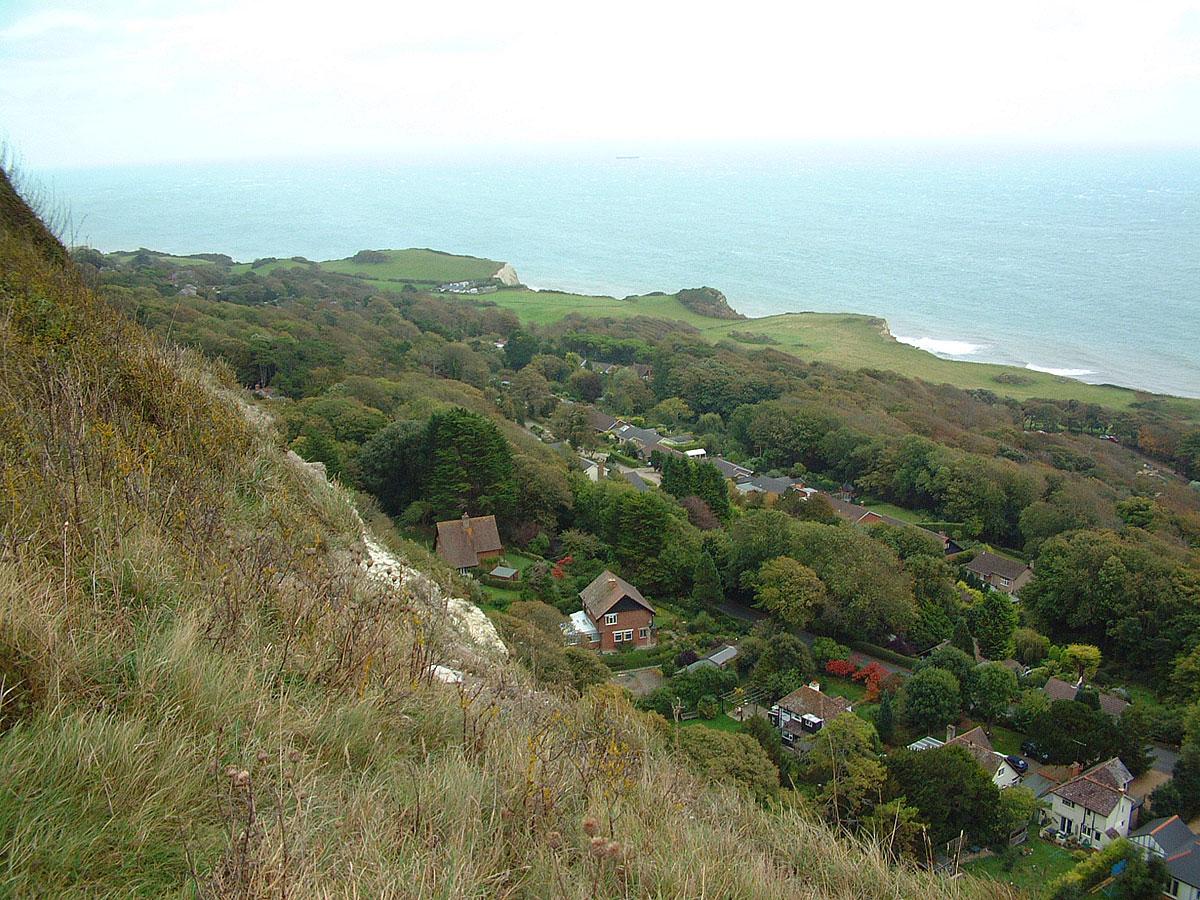
Isle of Wight Undercliff at St Lawrence, looking down from the Isle of Wight Coastal Path.

The stable section of the Undercliff has evidence of long human occupation, with ancient churches at Bonchurch and St Lawrence, and archaeological evidence of Paleolithic and Neolithic habitation.

Prior to the 19th century, it was the location of a number of large estates, including that at Steephill, whose owners included Hans Stanley, Wilbraham Tollemache, and John Hambrough, builder of the now-demolished Steephill Castle.

The Undercliff was a popular development site in the mid-19th century, which saw the construction of many cottages orné and marine villas, with associated grounds. These developments included Steephill Castle, owned in the early 20th century by John Morgan Richards; the villa of Richards' novelist daughter Pearl Mary Teresa Craigie; and houses built for the industrialist William Spindler in the 1880s during his attempt, cut short by his death, to develop St Lawrence as a town. Bonchurch was a particular focus of development, a number of elite Victorians renting or owning homes there (e.g. William Adams, Thomas Carlyle, Charles Dickens, Henry Beaumont Leeson, Lord Macaulay, Elizabeth Missing Sewell, and Henry De Vere Stacpoole).

Victorian Undercliff development also extended westward beyond Niton to Blackgang, partly out of the general trend for speculative building, and partly in association with the establishment of the amusement park at Blackgang Chine. These properties, however, have largely been obliterated by landslides and coastal erosion over the 20th century.

The growth of Ventnor in particular was driven by its popularity as a health and holiday resort from 1830. The physician Arthur Hill Hassall, a tuberculosis sufferer, moved to the Isle of Wight in 1869. On the basis of his experience of the climate of the Undercliff, he established a sanatorium east of Ventnor, the National Cottage Hospital for Consumption and Diseases of the Chest (later Royal National Hospital for Diseases of the Chest). While the hospital was closed in 1964 and demolished in 1969, its grounds were redeveloped as the twenty-two-acre (8.9 ha) Ventnor Botanic Garden, which takes advantage of the same mild conditions to grow plants from worldwide Mediterranean habitats.

Later Undercliff residents included the writers Alfred Noyes and Aubrey de Sélincourt, and the yachtsman Uffa Fox.

== Access ==
The Undercliff is accessed by the A3055 road running its length from Niton to Bonchurch. West of Ventnor, before 2014 the Southern Vectis 3 bus followed the section called Undercliff Drive as far as St Lawrence; the Southern Vectis 6 ran north-east from Ventnor to Bonchurch and beyond. The road's low-level continuation between Niton and Blackgang was broken by landslips in the 20th century. The road between St Lawrence and Niton collapsed in two places at the westerly edge of St Lawrence on 17 February 2014 as a result of land movement following a period of prolonged rainfall amidst ongoing engineering works to stabilize the A3055 and prolong its use. There is currently no vehicular access between St Lawrence and Niton along the former road. Vehicular traffic must go via Whitwell. Pedestrian and cycle access was restored by late 2016. Bus routes are diverted and no longer serve St Lawrence; as of 2024, the 3 passes from Ryde via Bonchurch through Ventnor to Wroxall and Newport, while the 6 goes from Ventnor via Whitwell and Blackgang to Newport. A few steep roads (probably ancient routes, locally termed "shutes") connect the clifftop to the lower Undercliff level: Niton Shute, St Lawrence Shute, and Bonchurch Shute.

The Undercliff was formerly served by railway stations at Ventnor (Ventnor railway station and Ventnor West) and St Lawrence.

The area can be visited on foot by the Ventnor-Blackgang section of the Isle of Wight Coastal Path, and there are a number of scenic walks along and below the cliffs backing the Undercliff. These include Gore Cliff east of Niton, the 'Cripple Path' and 'St Rhadegund's Path' that climb the inner cliff at Niton and St Lawrence, the Devil's Chimney, and the Bonchurch Landslips.

== Locations of interest ==
- Blackgang Chine
- Bonchurch Landslips
- The Chink
- The Devil's Chimney.
- Old St. Boniface Church, Bonchurch.
- St. Boniface Church, Bonchurch
- St. Catherine's Lighthouse
- St Lawrence Old Church.
- Steephill Cove.
- Ventnor Botanic Garden.
- Ventnor Museum.
