= Luccombe Bay =

Coordinates: 50°36′39″N 1°10′30″W

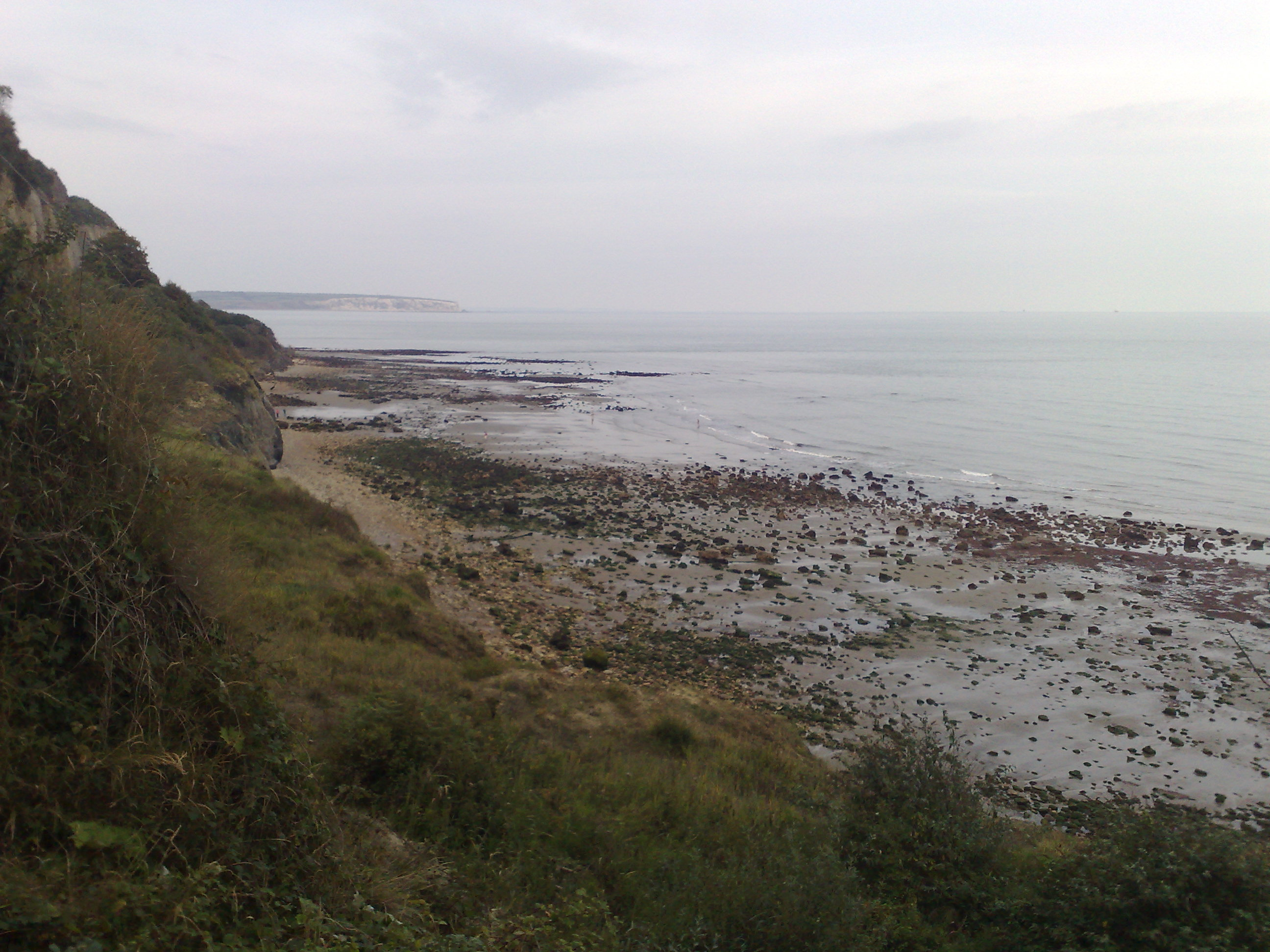
- Luccombe Bay looking to the north

- Location within the Isle of Wight
- Civil parish: Shanklin
- Ceremonial county: Isle of Wight
- Region: South East
- Country: England
- Sovereign state: United Kingdom
- UK Parliament: Isle of Wight East

Luccombe Bay is a bay on the south-east coast of the Isle of Wight, England. It lies to the east of Luccombe Village from which it takes its name. It faces south-east towards the English Channel, its shoreline is 2/3 mile (1.1 km) in length. It consists of a predominantly sand and shingle beach lined with sea cliffs which range from 200 to 280 feet (60 to 85 m) in height. It stretches from Horse Ledge in the north to Bordwood Ledge in the south. The sea bottom is a mixture of mud and rocks.

Along the top of the cliffs which line the bay is the site of the National trust maintained 4 1/2-mile (7.2 km) Luccombe and the Landslip Walk.

The bay is best viewed from Luccombe Chine which descends to the beach about two-thirds of the way along the bay. A small fishing community existed at the foot of the Chine on the bay until it was destroyed in the Great Landslip of 1910. The area is the site of a lot of erosion and cliff retreat (though no cliff failures), with a loss of around a foot (30 cm) per year.
