= Luccombe Chine =

Chine on the Isle of Wight

Coordinates: 50°36′37″N 1°10′39″W

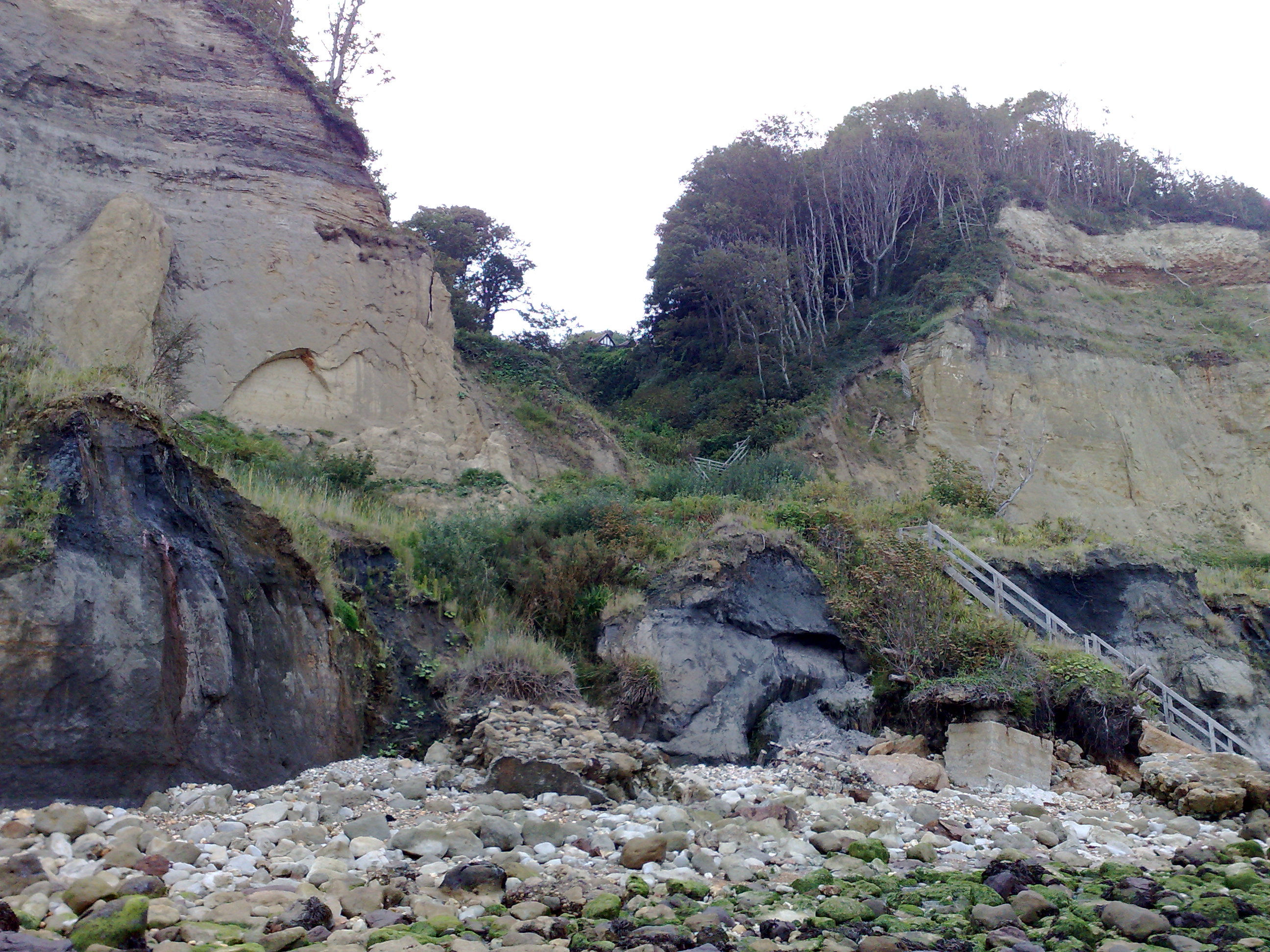
Luccombe Chine from the beach, 2008

Luccombe Chine on the Isle of Wight

Luccombe Chine is a geological feature and visitor attraction south of the village of Luccombe on the Isle of Wight, England. A wooded coastal ravine, one of a number of such chines on the island created by stream erosion of soft Cretaceous rocks, it leads from the clifftop to Luccombe Bay.

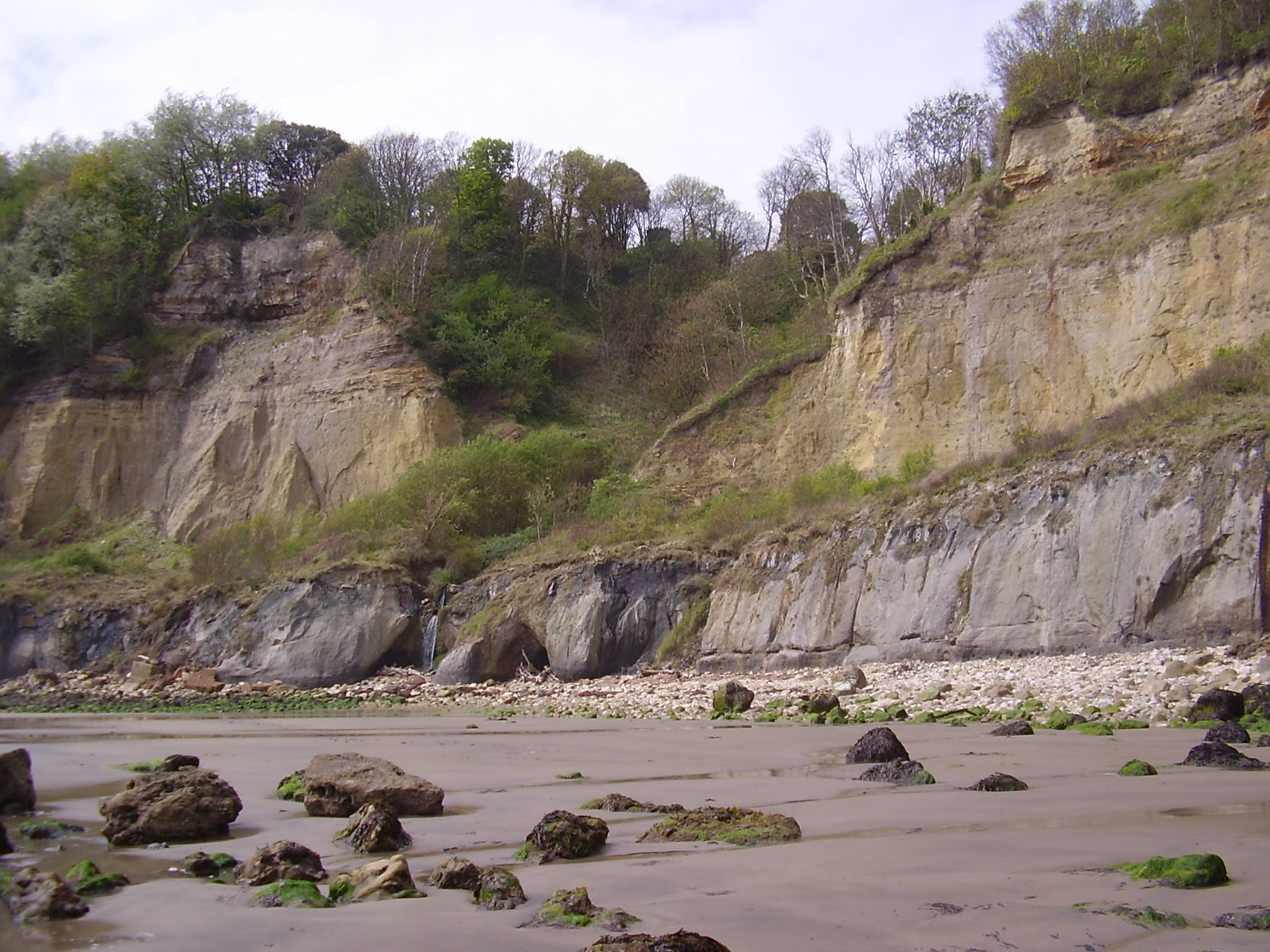
The chine in 2017; the steps have been lost to landslips and erosion

The Chine is at the eastern end of the Isle of Wight Undercliff landslip. A small fishing community existed at the foot of the Chine until 1910, when the settlement was destroyed by a landslip. There were previously steps down to the beach from the clifftop coastal path, but these are now (as of 2017) closed due to erosion and landslips.
