= Devil's Chimney (Isle of Wight) =

Rock cleft in Ventnor, Isle of Wight, England

Coordinates: 50.6041°N 1.1807°W

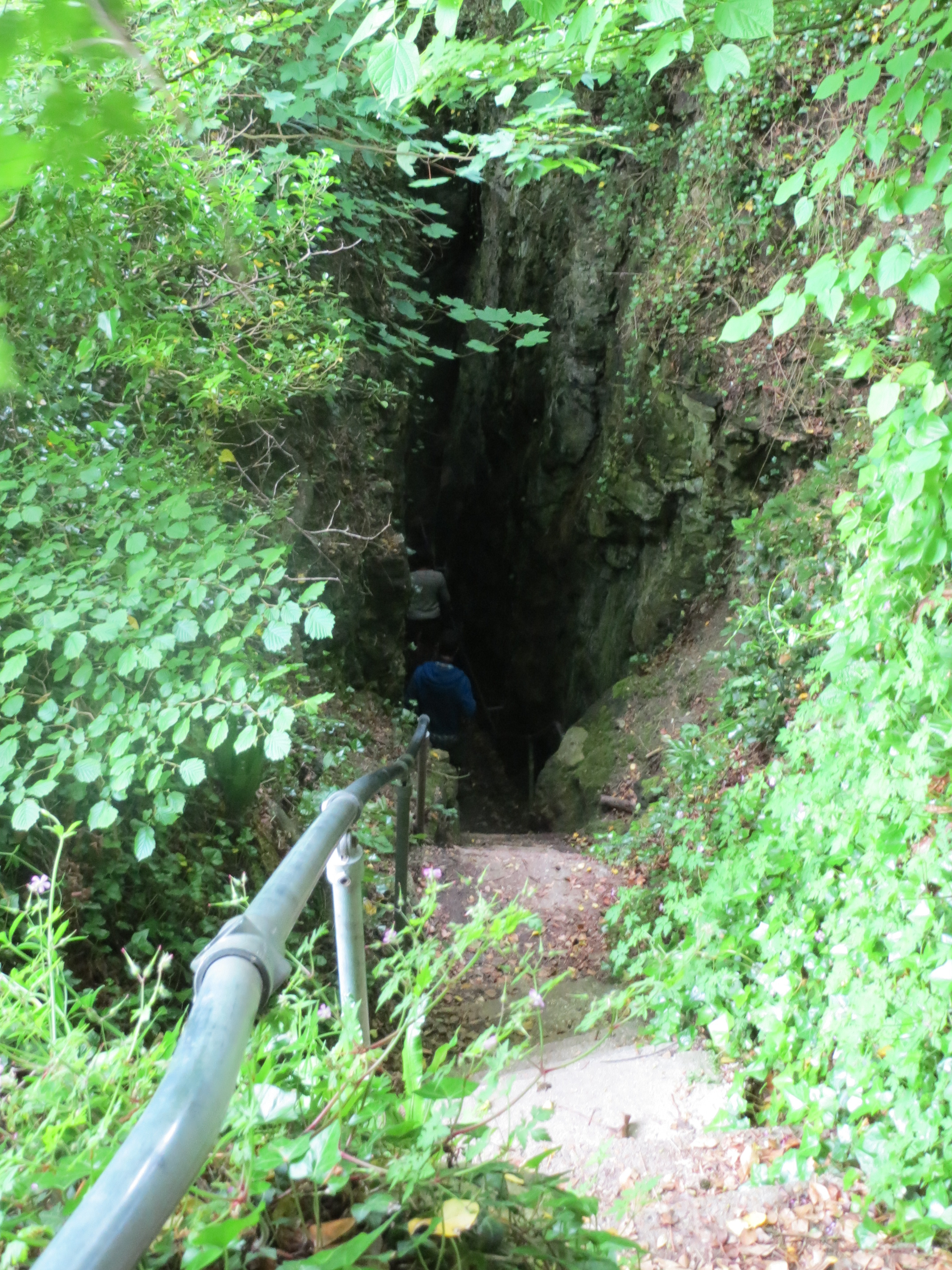
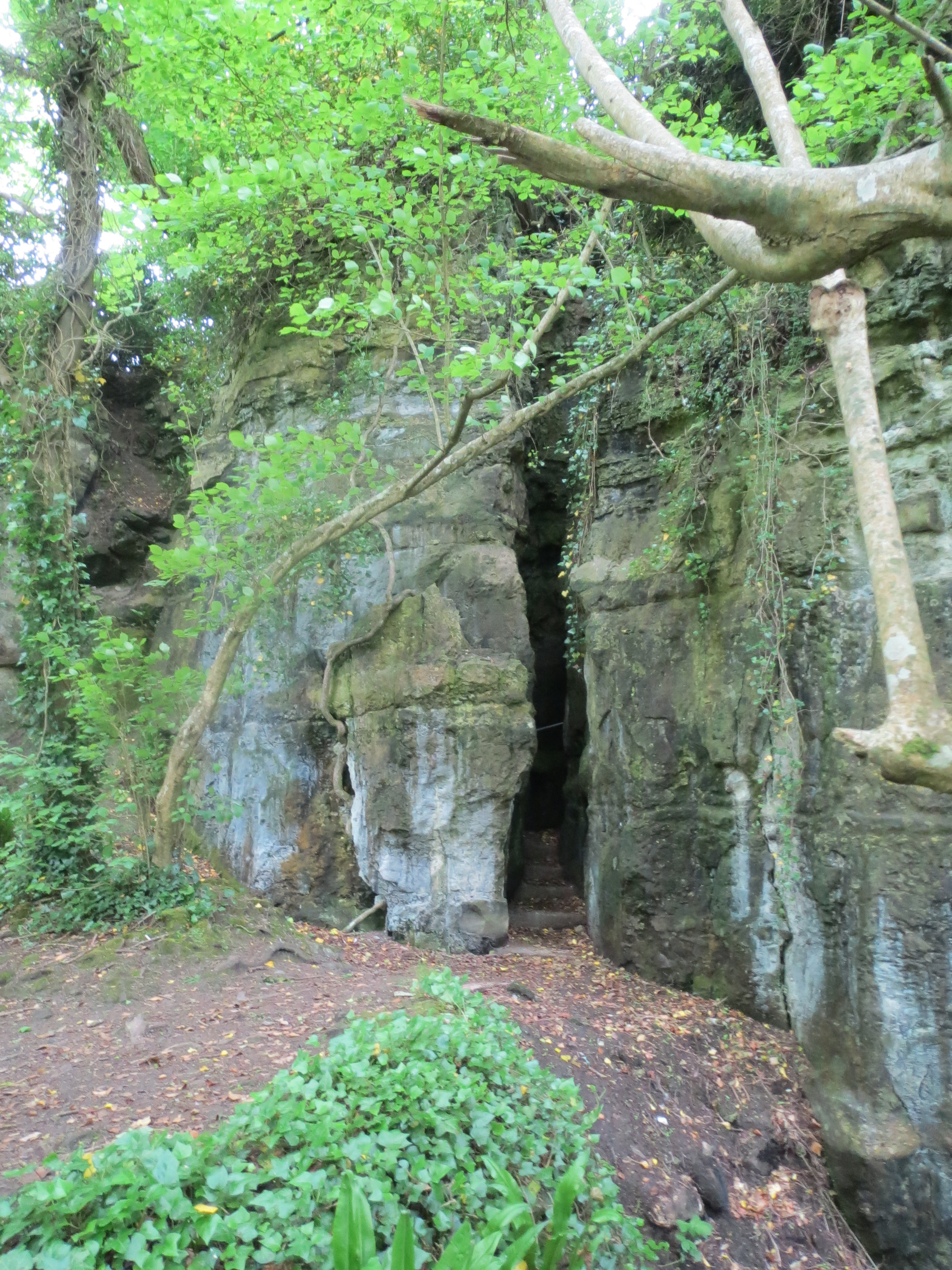
Upper (left) and lower views of the Devil's Chimney, prior to 2023 landslide
The Devil's Chimney on the Isle of Wight

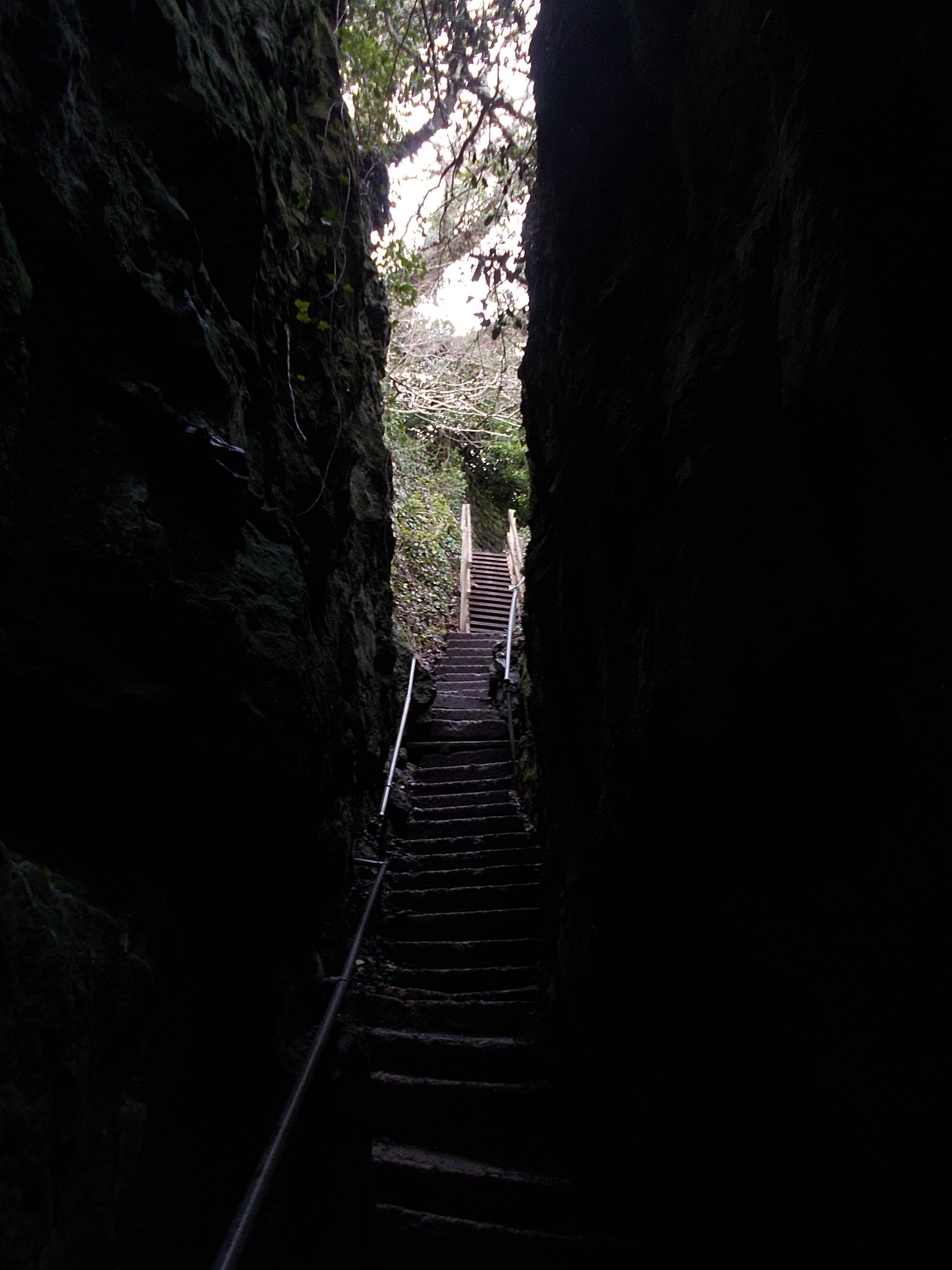
Inside the "chimney", prior to the 2023 landslide

The Devil's Chimney is a rock cleft in the area of the Bonchurch Landslips, between Bonchurch and Luccombe, Isle of Wight, formerly a scenic attraction with steps that descended into the landslip. The feature was initially thought to have been destroyed in a major landslide that occurred on the evening of 10 December 2023, but subsequent footage shows that it remains intact, although the whole area is now inaccessible to the public.

Its upper end was at the Smugglers Haven Tearooms at the base of Nansen Hill, at the southern end of clifftop parkland accessed from the Leeson Road car park on the A3055 road, where there is a Southern Vectis bus route 3 stop.

One of several such paths connecting the clifftop to the Isle of Wight Undercliff, the Devil's Chimney followed a joint through the Upper Greensand crags capping the cliffs above the Landslip. The path continued down through the Landslip as footpath V65C, meeting the coastal path V65A at its foot. Following the December 2023 event, all paths in the landslip area are now destroyed or closed as unsafe.

A similar rock cleft, the Chink, lies about 200 yards north.

The feature is within the Bonchurch Landslip nature reserve, managed by Gift to Nature, a countryside management project run by a local charity, on behalf of the owners, Isle of Wight Council.
