= St Boniface Down =

Hill on the Isle of Wight, England

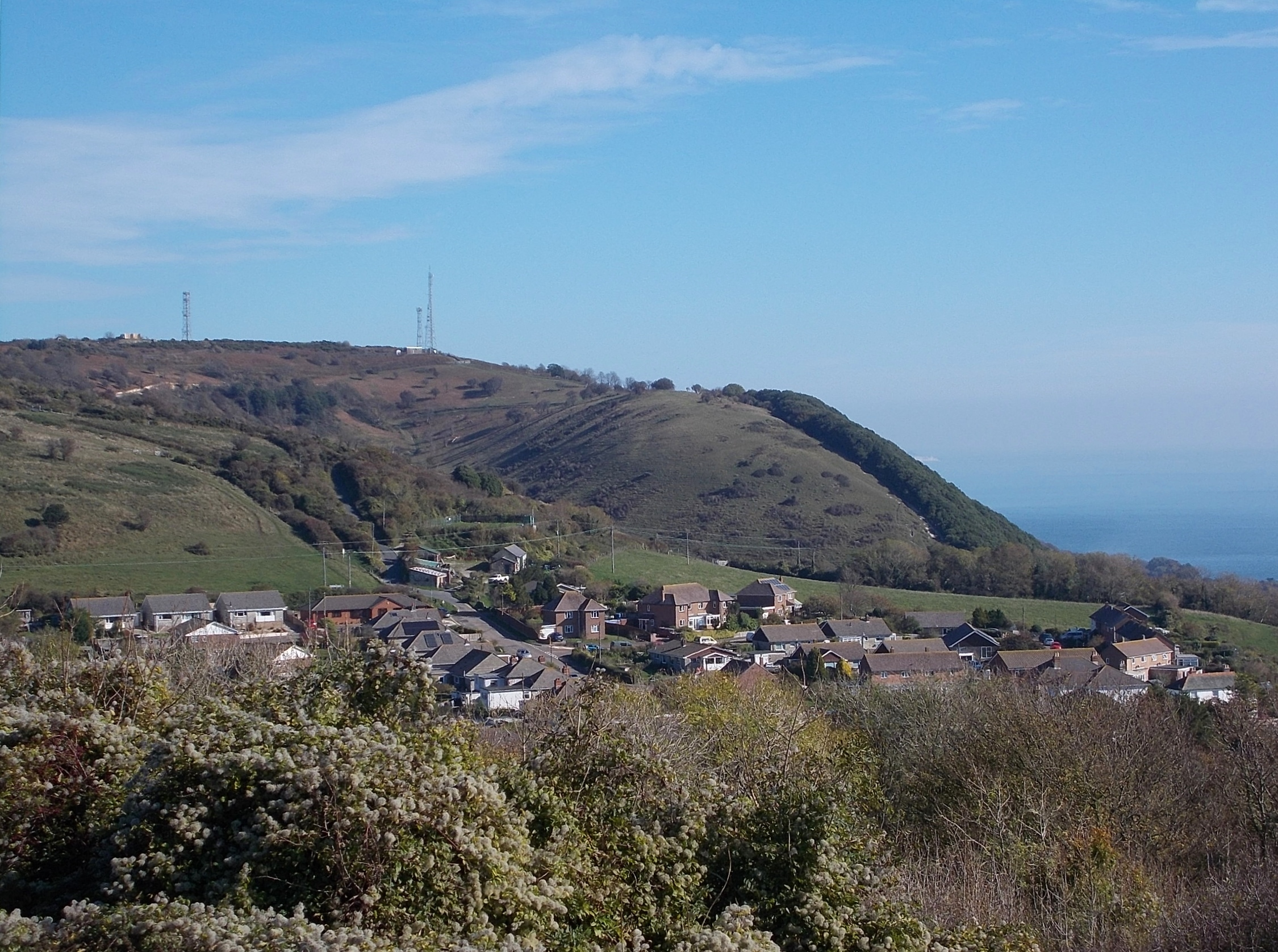

Highest point
- Elevation: 241 m (791 ft)
- Prominence: 241 m (791 ft)(island highpoint)
- Listing: Marilyn, Hardy, County Top
- Coordinates: 50°36′12.46″N 1°11′55.43″W

Geography
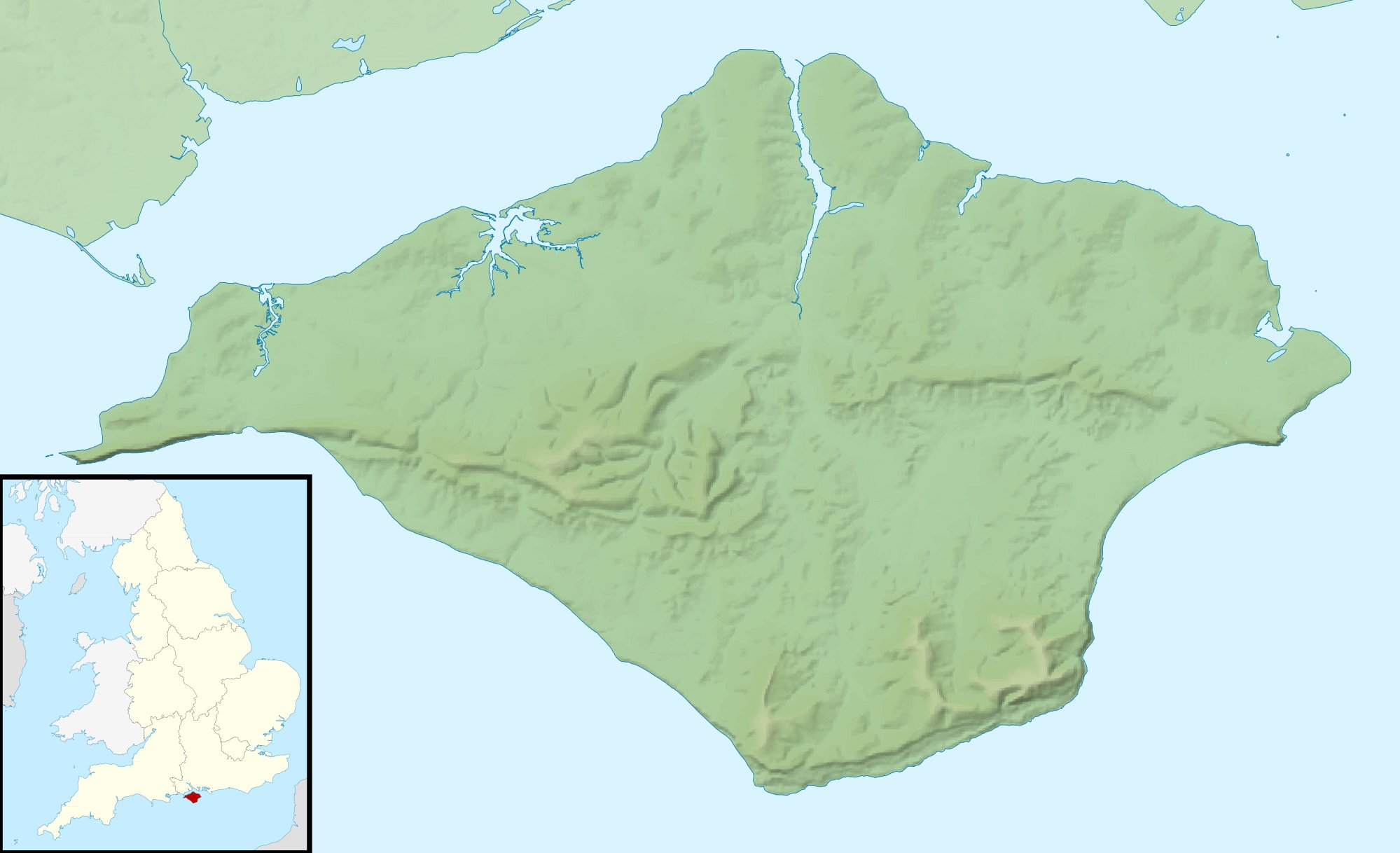
- Location within Isle of Wight
- Location: Isle of Wight, England
- OS grid: SZ568785
- Topo map: OS Landranger 196

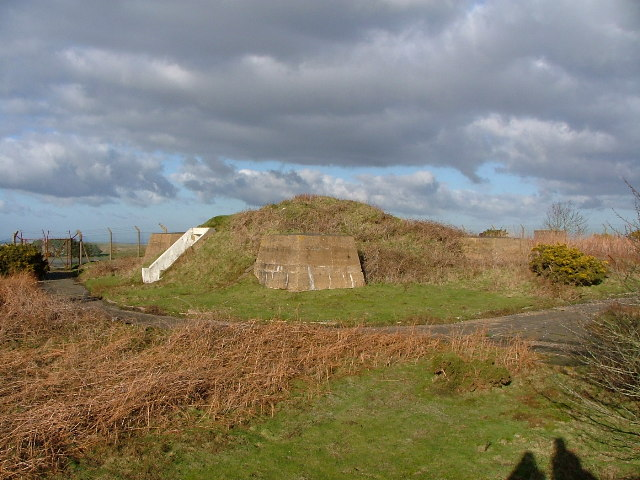
The radar station on the summit

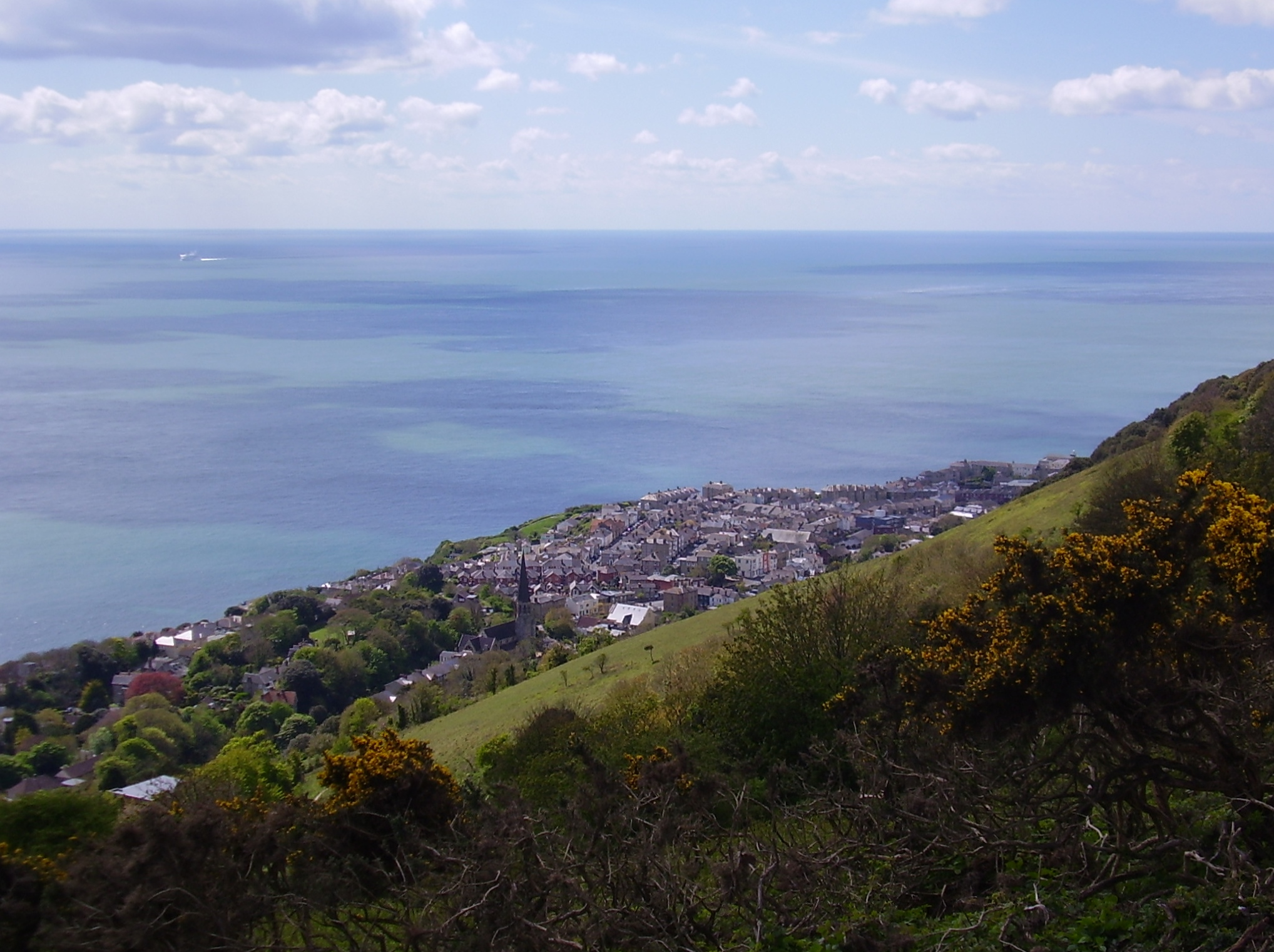
View of Ventnor, looking south-west down the steep southern face of the down

St Boniface Down is a chalk down near Ventnor, on the Isle of Wight, England. Its summit, 241 metres (791 ft), is the highest point on the island, with extensive views on a clear day stretching across the Island to the mainland beyond, as well as southwards over the English Channel. It is 1 kilometre (0.6 mi) north of the town. There is reputed to be a wishing well on its southern slope, which requires the wisher to climb up from the south without looking back. In 1545, a French invasion force attempted this against a force of the Isle of Wight Militia commanded by Sir John Fyssher – which allegedly included several women archers – and were routed. In 1940, the radar station was bombed by Ju 87 Stuka dive bombers, which is reconstructed in the film "The Battle of Britain". The top is surmounted by a round barrow.

At the eastern foot of the down, on the A3055 road between Bonchurch and Luccombe, a path formerly descended into Bonchurch Landslips via a scenic rock cleft, the Devil's Chimney. Following a major landslip in December 2023, this path is now partially destroyed and closed as unsafe.

== Name ==
The down was named from the dedication in the Norman church in Bonchurch.

13th century: Mons Sancti Bonifacii (Latin)

1769: Boniface Down

1781: St Bonface Down

== Wildlife ==
St Boniface Down is home to the largest cricket species within the British Isles, the great green bush cricket.

The area includes some unusual plant communities including acid grassland and heathland, resulting in parts of the Down being designated as a Site of Special Scientific Interest. The gravel capping supports extensive tracts of gorse Ulex europaeus with intervening areas of heathland and acid grassland dominated by heather Calluna vulgaris, bell heather Erica cinerea, purple moor-grass Molinia caerulea, bristle bent Agrostis curtisii and locally bilberry Vaccinium myrtillus. The occurrence of heathland on deep gravel overlying chalk, the naturalised holm oak woodland and the juxtaposition of heath and chalkland vegetation are all unusual biological features in Britain.

== Cultural references ==
St Boniface Down is also the name and was the inspiration of a 1956 work by the English composer, Trevor Duncan.
