= Lowtherville =

Settlement on the Isle of Wight

Coordinates: 50.5984°N 1.2164°W

Lowtherville: Upper Ventnor, Up Shute
- Village
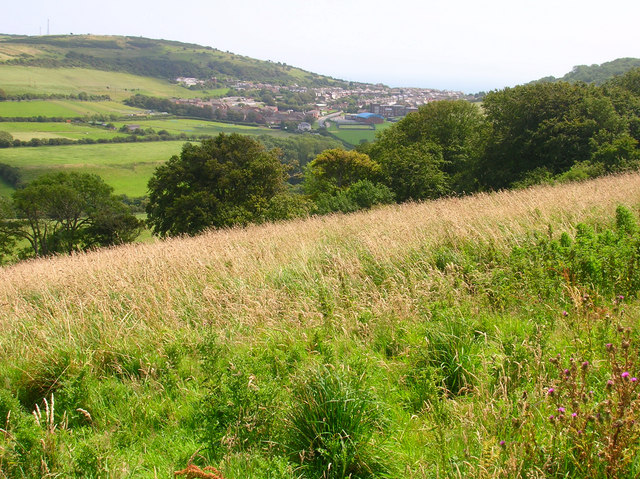
- Lowtherville viewed from Week Down

- Location within the Isle of Wight
- OS grid reference: SZ5555277927
- Civil parish: Ventnor
- Unitary authority: Isle of Wight
- Shire county: Isle of Wight
- Region: South East
- Country: England
- Sovereign state: United Kingdom
- Post town: VENTNOR
- Postcode district: PO
- Police: Hampshire and Isle of Wight
- Fire: Hampshire and Isle of Wight
- Ambulance: Isle of Wight

Lowtherville, more commonly called Upper Ventnor, but called Up Shute by the locals, is a village in the civil parish of Ventnor, on the Isle of Wight, England, near the town of Ventnor. The village is home to two schools, the secondary school The Island Free School, and the primary school St. Francis Catholic and Church of England Primary Academy. It has an average elevation of 139.2 metres (456.6 feet) above sea level and most properties were built around 1900.

== Name ==
Originally just called Lowther, the name comes from the name of the principal landowner Captain Francis Lowther.

== Location ==
It is located in the civil parish of Ventnor, with its highest point being Littleton Down at 223 metres above sea level (731 feet).

To the north there is Wroxall, to the north east there is Wroxall Down (199 metres, 652 feet), to the east there is Littleton Down (223 metres, 731 feet), to the south east there is Ventnor, to the south there is Ventnor, to the south west there is Steephill and Ventnor, to the west there is Week Down (211 metres, 692 feet) and Rew Down (198 metres, 649 feet), to the north west there is Stenbury Down (210 metres, 688 feet).

== History ==
In the late 1800s, Lowtherville began to grow, from a few houses and four streets in 1880, to around 400 houses today. On Lowtherville road, one of the first buildings was Ventnor and Undercliff Isolation Hospital, built far away from the built-up area. The first place of worship to be opened in the village was St. Margaret's Wesleyan Chapel and Sunday School, with the foundation stone being layed down on 8 November 1881, and was opened in 1882. The first lesson was held on 25 July of that year, with around 80 children attending. On 29 May 1895, the foundation stone for a schoolroom extension was laid, and was opened the next year. It was closed in 1968 for development. A block of council flats was built in its place in 1971, and was named Wesley Court in memory of the school.

Opened in 1898 and closed permanently in 1985, The Lowtherville Tunnel was a 1,750 foot (533 metre) long sewage pipe stretching from Newport Road to St. Alban's Steps.

By the early 1900s, there were over a dozen shops for most essentials, such as March's Bakery, and L.A Wood Grocer, etc. Now there are only two shops.

There used to be a railway line going through the village down to Ventnor station, but is now disused, like many other stations after the closures in the 1920s.

One of the roads, Steephill Road, was infamous for dirty washing water running down it, with the locals giving it the nickname 'Soapsuds Alley'.

'Donkey Milligan', who gave donkey rides along Ventnor Esplanade, lived in Lowtherville with his donkey and often let his donkeys roam free in Lowtherville and around the downs near Ventnor.

George and Horace "Dido" Grant, living on the same street as Donkey Milligan, Lowtherville Road, ran a scrap metal business, Steptoe and Son, a business local to Ventnor.

The area 'Annie Bucket' was named after Annie Bucket, who was locally famous for taking in and washing laundry.

Pietro "Pete" Cortesi, who came to Ventnor as a POW in World War 2, set up a shoe shining shop there.

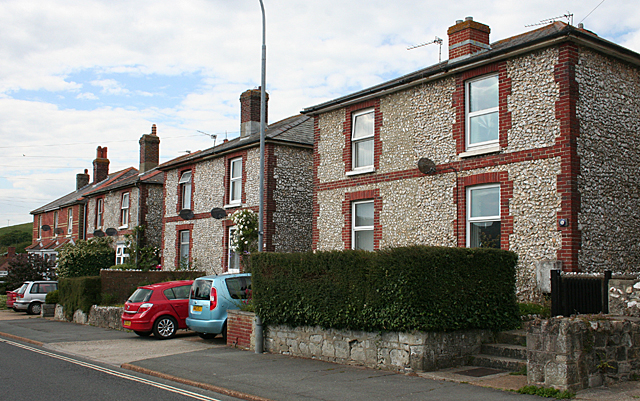
Newport Road, Lowtherville

In the village there was also RAF Ventnor, which had important roles in detecting planes during the Battle of Britain, and, as a result of this, pylons up St. Boniface Down became targets, causing some bombs to hit the town below. In 1953, a new camp was built.

There are 2 Grade II listed buildings in the village, the Cemetery Chapel and the Cemetery Mortuary.

== See also ==
- List of hills of the Isle of Wight
