= Blackgang =

Coordinates: 50.59°N 1.31°W

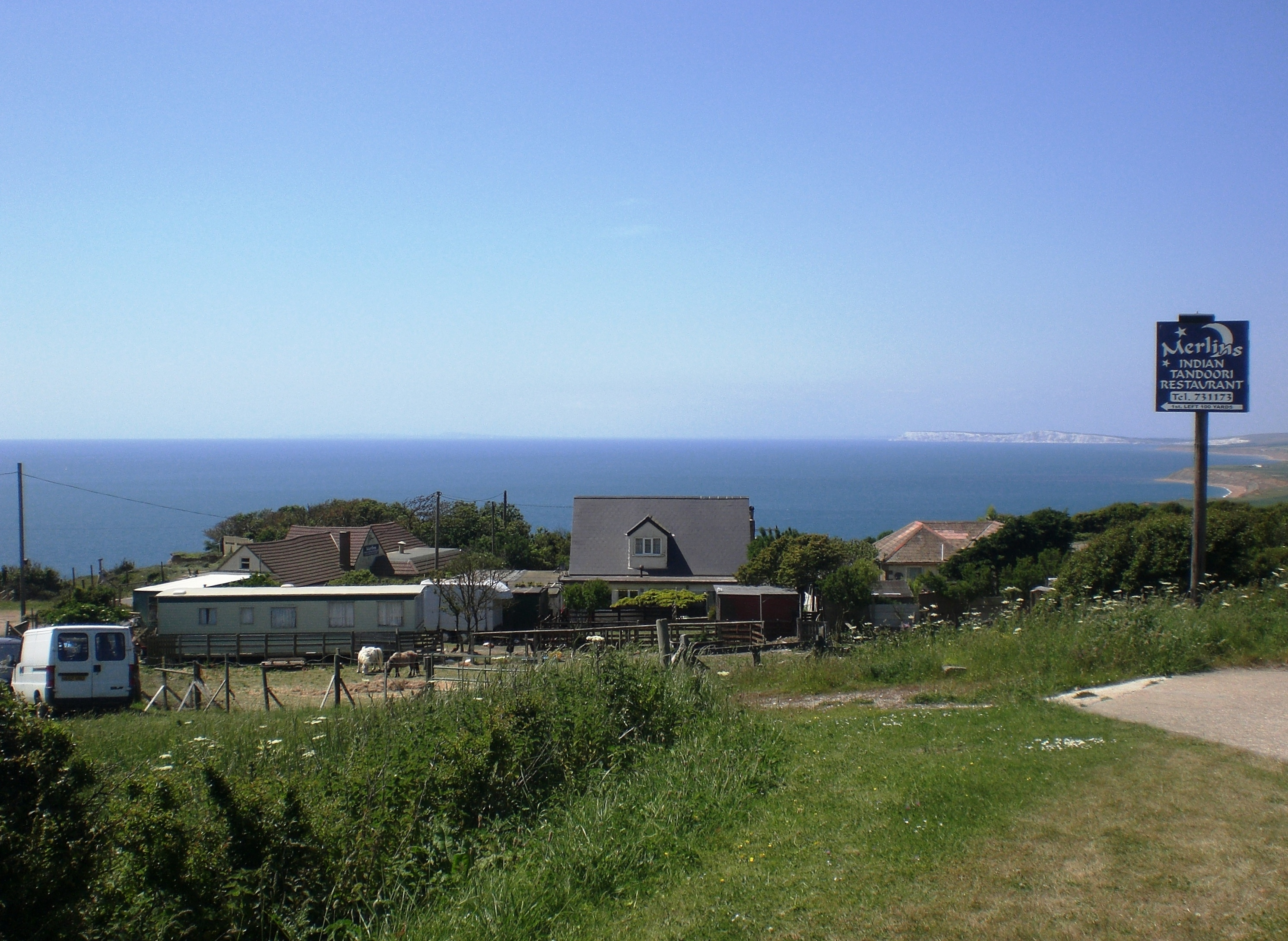
- A small number of houses close to the cliffs at Blackgang.

- Location within the Isle of Wight
- Unitary authority: Isle of Wight
- Ceremonial county: Isle of Wight
- Region: South East
- Country: England
- Sovereign state: United Kingdom
- Post town: VENTNOR
- Postcode district: PO38
- Dialling code: 01983
- UK Parliament: Isle of Wight West

Blackgang is a village on the south-western coast of the Isle of Wight, England. It is best known as the location of the Blackgang Chine amusement park which sits to the south of St. Catherine's Down.

Blackgang forms the west end of the Ventnor Undercliff region, which extends for 12 kilometres from Blackgang to Luccombe, also encompassing the town of Ventnor and the villages of Bonchurch, St Lawrence, and Niton. It also marks the edge of the Back of the Wight (West Wight).

== Name ==
The name means 'the dark path or track', from Old English blæc and gang, referring a path at the bottom of a now destroyed chine. Some say that the name refers to a black gang of smugglers, but is incorrect.

== History ==
Historically, Blackgang was a hamlet that expanded into a small village in the mid-19th century, partly out of a Victorian fashion for speculative building of marine villas, and partly in association with the establishment of the amusement park at the chine, then 400 feet (120 m) deep, the large coastal ravine (historically known for being a haunt of smugglers) after which the park was named. The nearby Sandrock Spring, a chalybeate spring discovered in 1811, was another visitor attraction.

The majority of Blackgang's Victorian coastal development, along with the chine itself, was obliterated by landslides and coastal erosion over the 20th century, part of a general pattern of erosion affecting the Undercliff area. A major landslide severed the old road between Blackgang and Niton in 1928, and subsequent ones destroyed most of the remaining road segment and adjoining houses, as well as the Sandrock Spring in 1978. Currently Blackgang comprises the amusement park (whose buildings incorporate some of the village's former residential houses such as the Blackgang Hotel and Five Rocks), a tearoom, and a few other houses.

Clifftop walks in and around the area give panoramic views of the English Channel and the south-western Isle of Wight coast (the Back of the Wight). Blackgang is also notable for dinosaur fossils and the nudist Blackgang Beach.

Blackgang was the birthplace of the actress and comedian Sheila Hancock.

Southern Vectis operates bus route 6 to Newport and Ventnor through the village.

=== The Chad Rock ===
The Chad Rock (also known as the Salisbury Rock) was an over 40 feet (12 m) tall boulder that stood by the old road from Blackgang to Niton, probably laid down at the end of the Ice Age more than 10,000 years ago. In a major landslip of 1928, Chad Rock still stood on the cliffside afterwards. The origin of its name is unknown, as Chad is not a name native to the Island, and St Chad, the 7th century Anglo-Saxon saint, seems to be associated with Northern England. It was also known as the Salisbury Rock because the image of Lord Salisbury was said to be visible. When World War II begun, the beaches were barricaded and the Rock was inaccessible. After the war, locals returned to see it but it was gone. It was thought that it was bombed by the enemy, but the truth was that the British Army had targeted it to test its strength.

== Road to nowhere ==
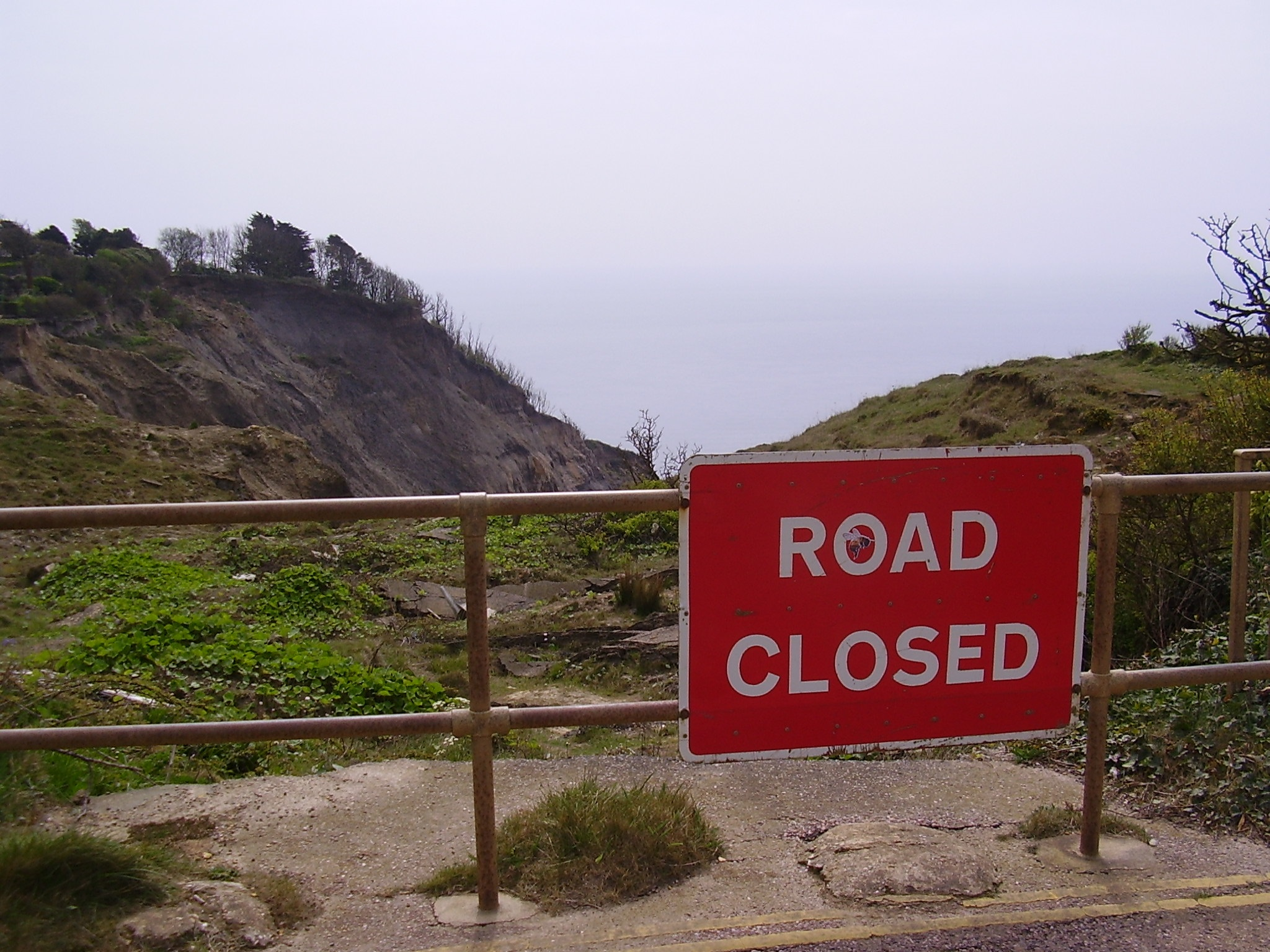
Blackgang is inexorably slipping into the sea

On the military road near Blackgang Chine Fantasy Park is an old pub called "the Coach House" and latterly called Merlin's Bistro - now a private house. The road ends not far past Merlin's, as in 1994 a major landslip caused the old road to Blackgang Chine entrance to fall through. The small road with a couple of bungalows (still lived in) is a rather sorry sight, as one of Blackgang Chine's areas still lies there derelict. "Adventureland", as it was known, was a play park area for children. The crooked house (at Blackgang Chine, which has now been moved) once stood here also. The remains of Adventureland include a seesaw structure, the brick remains of a wall that surrounded the crooked house originally stood, "Mission Control" (a Nasa-style space control room with levers and buttons) and an old Wicksteed roundabout. This area was accessible up until very recently. Over the opposite side of the road is the derelict "White House" guesthouse.
