= Clearway =

Section of road where parking or stopping is prohibited

The term clearway is used in several Commonwealth countries to refer to stretches of road or street where parking is prohibited.

== Australia ==
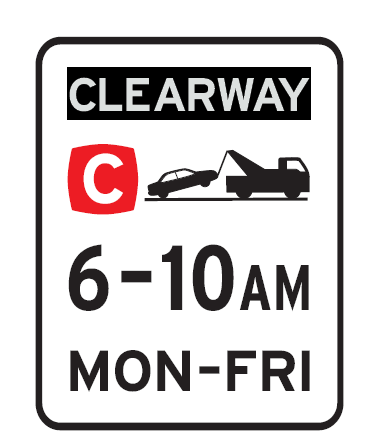
Example of a Clearway sign in New South Wales

In Australia, a clearway is a special road upon which only taxis and buses may stop at the kerb on certain times of the day. Any other vehicle which stands at the kerb may be towed away (unless there is some form of emergency).

Clearways are used on congested roads where there is no room for additional traffic lanes. Clearways aim to improve traffic flow at certain times of the day by prohibiting stopping in the lane next to the kerb, adding another lane to the roadway (when used on both sides of the road, two are added).

In New South Wales clearways are indicated by a yellow broken line at the kerb and "clearway" signage (which indicates the times of the day upon which the clearway operates).

In 2016, the criteria for a clearway in NSW was stated to be directional traffic flows of over 800 vehicles/hour, travel speeds 30km/h or below during peak, where alternative parking can be found and where the road is a strategic bus or freight corridor. From 2013 to 2020 the NSW Government implemented over 740km of clearways across Sydney.

In Perth, Western Australia, clearways operate between 7:30 and 9:00 am, and from 4:15 to 6:00 pm on weekdays. Parking meters do not accept payment during these times.

== New Zealand ==
In New Zealand, a clearway is section of road on which it is illegal to stop for any reason other than a breakdown or an obstruction to the road such as stationary traffic. Clearways may operate at all times or for limited times such as peak traffic flow times. As such, they operate in a similar way to those in the United Kingdom.

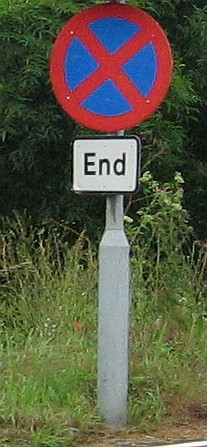
Sign for a clearway in the UK. The plate under the sign indicates that the clearway restrictions do not apply beyond this point. A similar sign is used for clearways in many other countries.

Similar signs are deployed on New Zealand clearways to British clearways, with a standard blue circle edged in red and featuring a red diagonal cross. If the clearway is for limited periods only, this will be indicated by a small sign below the clearway sign. Whereas in the United Kingdom a further notice with the word "Begins" or "End" will indicate the extent of a clearway, in New Zealand this is indicated by small signs featuring red arrows, indicating the direction from the sign in which the clearway is in operation. Larger white signs with black or red text indicating the details of the clearway are also sometimes found, featuring an image of the red and blue circle (as on the regular signs) as a prominent feature.

Clearways in New Zealand are almost always enforced by local authority parking wardens, who may also have offending vehicles towed away.

== United Kingdom ==
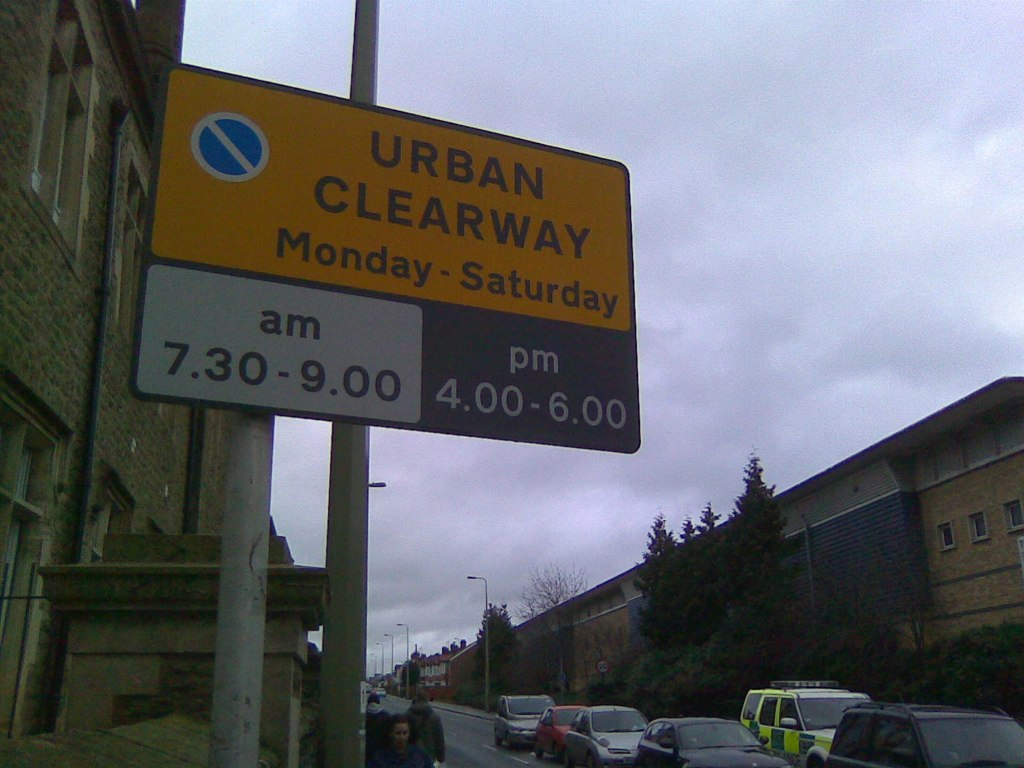
An urban clearway in Oxford.

In the United Kingdom, a clearway is a road or section of road on which it is illegal to stop on the main carriageway for any reason except in an emergency.

Certain sections of urban road may be designated Urban Clearway, which is a little-used designation, but one which prevents vehicles being stopped during the peak hours, typically 07:00–09:30 and 15:00–18:00. Vehicles are permitted to stop only as long as necessary to pick up or set down passengers. This allows the commuter traffic to flow more freely, but still allows for overnight and daytime parking when the road is not so busy.

== See also ==
- Red route
- Comparison of European road signs
