= William Adams (author) =

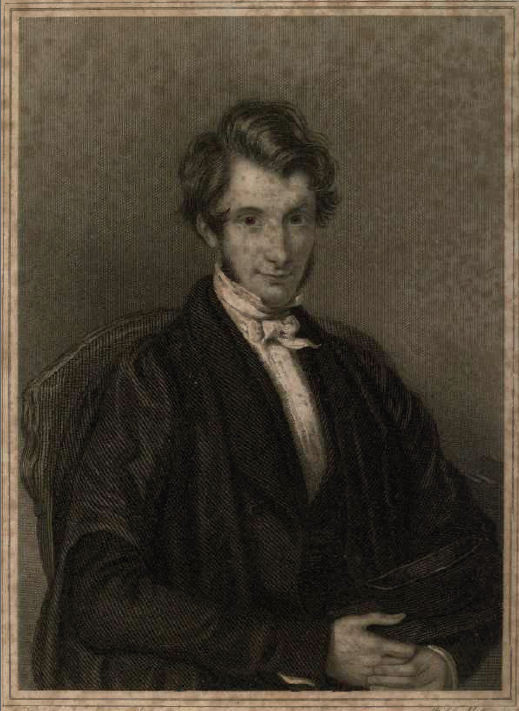
William Adams - a rather foxed image taken from an 1849 reprint of his Sacred allegories

William Adams (1814–1848), Church of England clergyman and author of Christian allegories popular in Britain in the 19th century.

== Biography ==
Adams was a member of an old Warwickshire family, being the second son of Mr. Serjeant Adams, by his marriage with Miss Eliza Nation, daughter of a well-known Exeter banker. He was educated at Eton and Oxford, and between the time of his leaving school and entering the university was the pupil of Dr. John Brasse, author of Brasse's Greek Gradus, by whom his great abilities were first appreciated. He obtained a postmastership at Merton, and in 1836 took a double first-class degree, his elder brother having gained a similar distinction eighteen months previously.

In 1837 he became fellow and tutor of his college, and in 1840 vicar of St. Peter's-in-the-East, a Merton living generally held by a resident fellow (and nowadays deconsecrated and forming part of St Edmund Hall. With his immediate predecessor at St. Peter's, Walter Kerr Hamilton, and his immediate successor, Edmund Hobhouse, Mr. Adams was very intimate. He always took a deep interest in the welfare of the parish, and has left us an interesting memorial of his incumbency in his well-known Warnings of the Holy Week, a set of lectures preached at St. Peter's in Holy Week, 1842. In the spring of this year he went to Eton as one of the examiners for the Newcastle scholarship, and, while bathing there, was all but drowned, and caught a violent cold which, flying to his lungs, ultimately proved fatal. It was hoped that a few months of residence in a warm climate would restore his health, and he accordingly passed the winter of 1842 in Madeira. But the disease had gained too firm a hold to be checked, and he resigned his living, settling at Bonchurch, Isle of Wight. Here he passed the last few years of his life, busily engaged with his pen, and taking part in every effort to improve the spiritual condition of the neighbourhood. He was at Bonchurch acquainted with Elizabeth Missing Sewell. One of his last public acts was to lay the foundation-stone of the new church at Bonchurch; and a few months later his remains were laid in the churchyard of the old church, where, by a happy design, his grave has the ‘shadow of the cross’ ever resting upon it.

All Adams's allegories were published when he was virtually a dying man. The Shadow of the Cross, written at Arborne Cottage, near Chertsey, in the summer of 1842, was followed by the Distant Hills in 1844. The design of both was to show the privileges of the baptised Christian and the danger of forfeiting those privileges. His next work, the Fall of Crœsus, was less successful; not, according to the Dictionary of National Biography (DNB), from any falling off in point of composition, but because the choice of subject was less happy. It is simply an English version of the story of Herodotus, with a Christian colouring. But his next production, the Old Man's Home, was the most successful of all his works. The DNB speculates that its success rests on the fact that the scene of it was laid in the Undercliff, which Adams knew well and loved, and which he described most vividly. The story itself is of additional interest, dealing as it does with an ‘old man,’ who is represented as hovering on the borderland between sanity and insanity, but full of true aspirations which to his keepers were unintelligible, when it is known that the author's father had done much to promote a more considerate treatment of the insane. This story was a special favourite with the poet Wordsworth. The King's Messengers was written during the very last months of Adams's life. Its object is to illustrate the danger of a wrong, and the blessedness of a right, use of money; and in the delineation of the characters the writer shows a dramatic power which he had not before displayed. Besides the works which bear William Adams's name there are two others which are to be ascribed to him, the Cherry Stones, or Charlton School, a capital story popular with boys, for the completed and edited by his brother, the Rev. Henry Cadwallader Adams, a well-known author; and Silvio, an allegory written before any of the others, and revised and published with a modest preface by another brother in 1862.

The popularity of Adams's allegories, which, besides passing through many editions in English, have been translated into more than one modern language, has been out of all proportion to their apparent slightness. The circumstances of their composition, no doubt, give a tinge of romantic interest to them—an interest which extends to the brief career of their author. But apart from this, according to the DNB, there is a peculiar fascination about them which carries the reader along, and which thoroughly reflects the personal character of the man.
