= Bonchurch Landslips =

Protected area on the Isle of Wight, England

Coordinates: 50.606°N 1.178°W

- Site of Special Scientific Interest
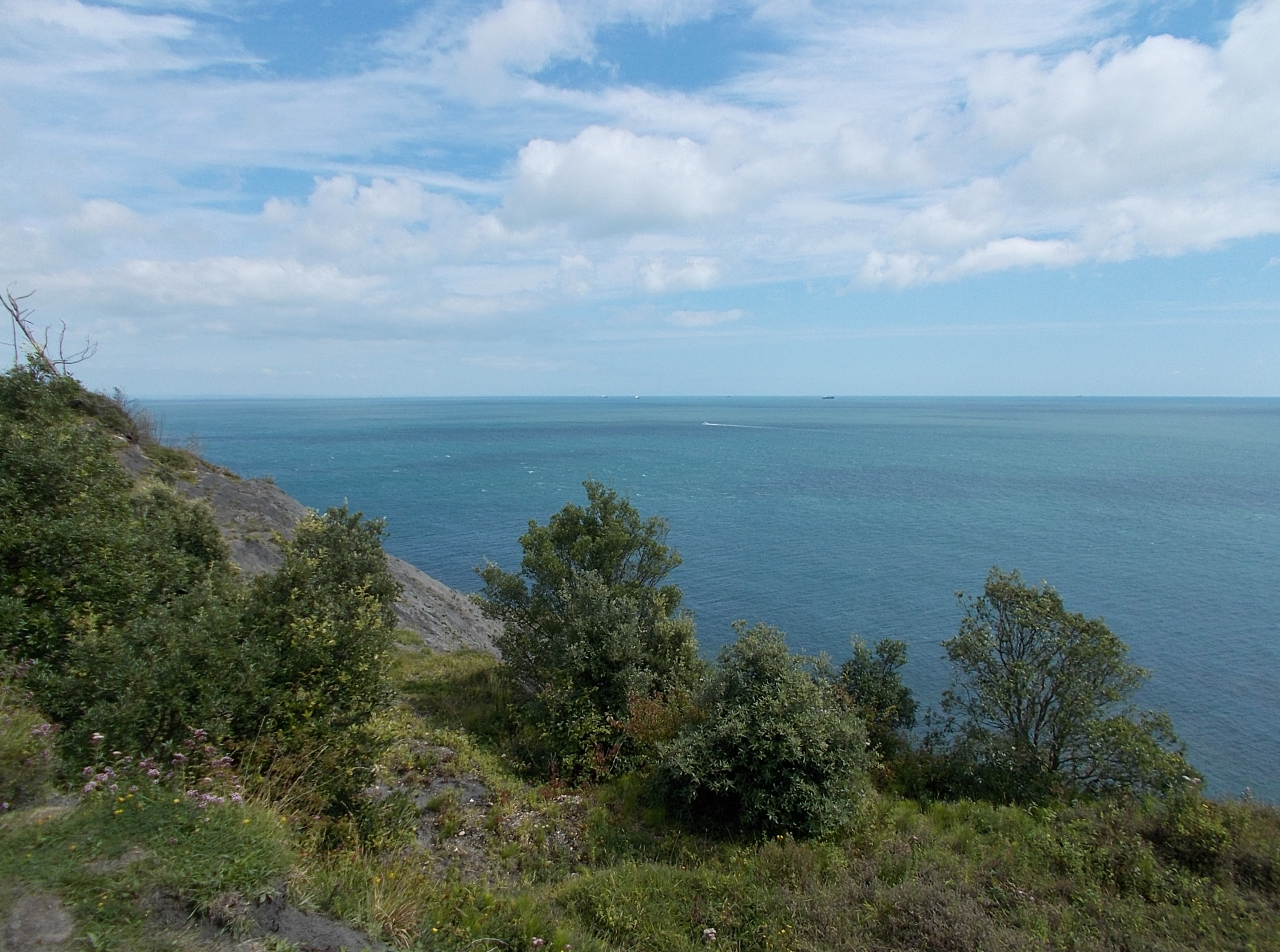
- Scenery at the Landslip in 2017
- Location of Bonchurch Landslips.
- Area of search: Isle of Wight
- Grid reference: SZ582785
- Interest: Biological and Geological
- Area: 28.2 ha (70 acres)
- Notification date: 1977
- Location map: Natural England

The Bonchurch Landslips on the Isle of Wight

Bonchurch Landslips is a 28.2-hectare (70-acre) site of special scientific interest which is located north-east of Ventnor, Isle of Wight. A wooded coastal landslip zone, the site was notified in 1977 for both its biological and geological features.

Part of the Isle of Wight Undercliff, it was formerly accessed by several footpaths, including Coastal Path V65b from Ventnor and V65a from Luccombe, footpath V65 descending into the landslip via a rock cleft called 'The Chink', and V65C, descending via another cleft, the Devil's Chimney. Many paths, along with much of the former woodland, were destroyed by a major landslide that occurred in December 2023. Paths not destroyed have been closed as unsafe, and the whole landslip area is now (as of 2025) inaccessible to the public.

== Geology and ecology ==
The Bonchurch Landslip (also called East End Landslip) involves a coastal Cretaceous sequence where harder Upper Greensand rocks overlie softer Gault clay. It has SSSI status for its geomorphological interest (the Undercliff itself, and the landslips and mud flows below) and its botanical assemblage. The Gault clay supports established woodland of ash, oak and beech, with unusual lichen species. The lower slips, comprising mixed clay and sandy habitats, support a complex mix of acid-loving and chalk-loving plant species.

== History ==
The Landslip is believed to have existed for thousands of years, but its present terrain derives largely from major landslide events in 1810 and 1818. An 1811 account by Thomas Webster described the scene:

I was surprised at the scene of devastation, which seemed to have been occasioned by some convulsion of nature. A considerable portion of the cliff had fallen down, strewing the whole of the ground between it and the sea with its ruins; huge masses of solid rock started up amidst heaps of smaller fragments, whilst immense quantities of loose marl, mixed with stones, and even the soil above with the wheat still growing on it, filled up the spaces between, and formed hills of rubbish which are scarcely accessible. Nothing had resisted the force of the falling rocks. Trees were levelled with the ground; and many lay half buried in the ruins. The streams were choked up, and pools of water were formed in many places. Whatever road or path formerly existed through this place had been effaced; and with some difficulty I passed over this avalanche which extended many hundred yards.

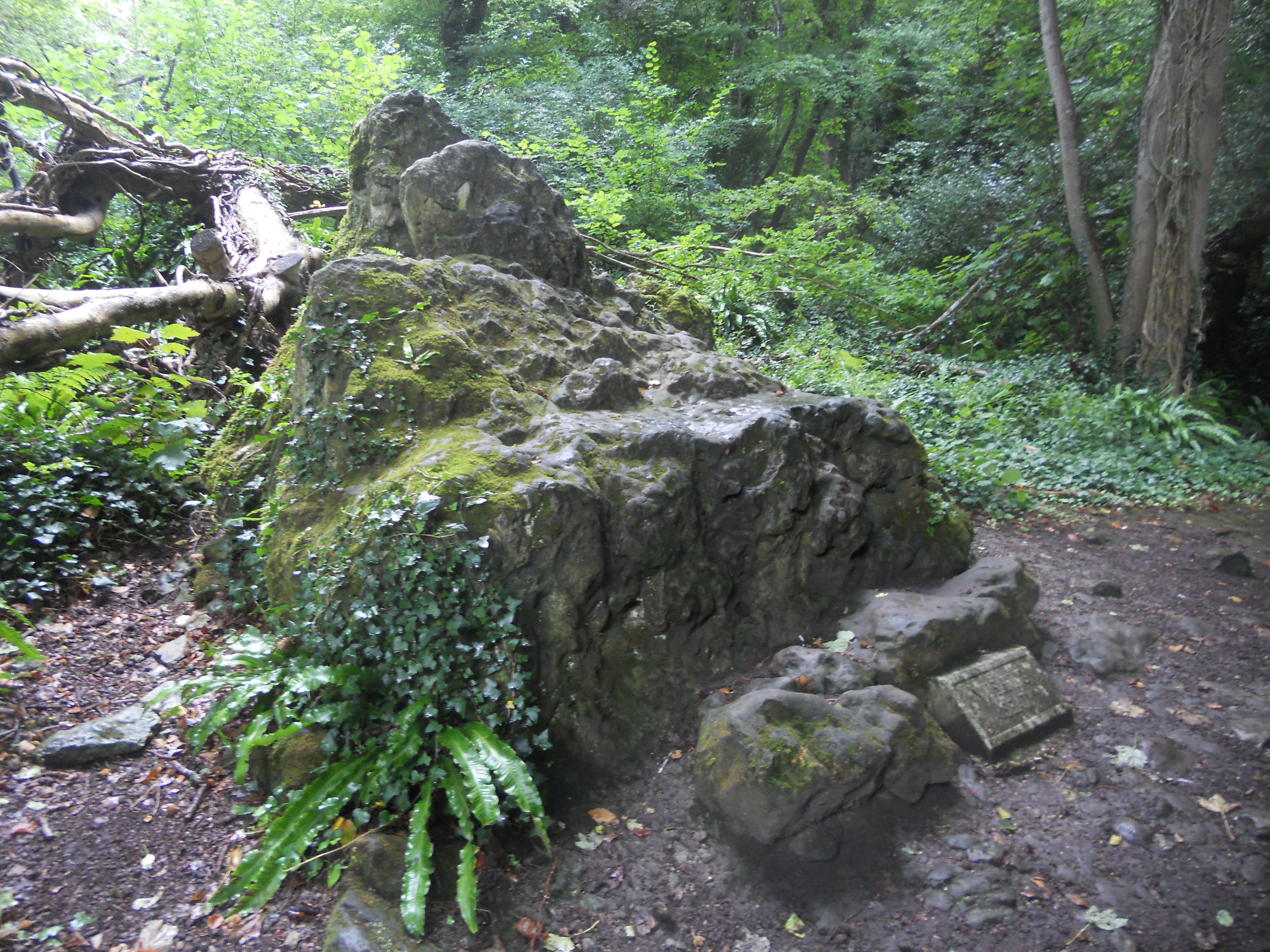
The Wishing Seat

The Bonchurch Landslip was developed as a picturesque woodland walk in Victorian times, with natural features including the Devil's Chimney, the Chink, and the Wishing Seat (a.k.a. Wishing Stone, a large moss-covered rock by the path).

A lesser slip took place in February 1995. Although Bonchurch village itself is on a stable part of the Undercliff, slippage is still active at its edge adjacent to The Bonchurch Landslip: in 2011, subsidence destroyed North Court, a Victorian villa.

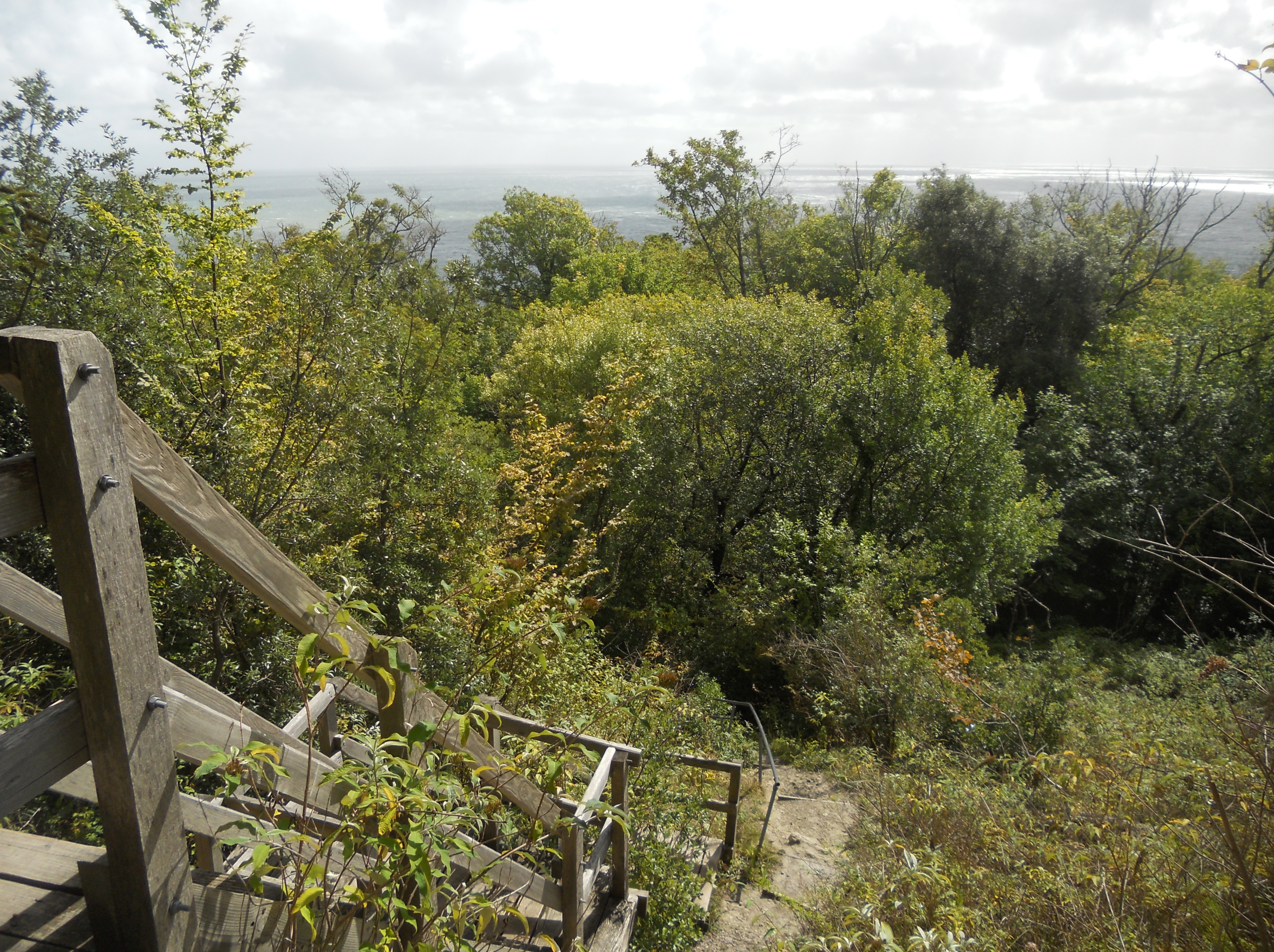
Path descending down into the landslip photographed in 2022.

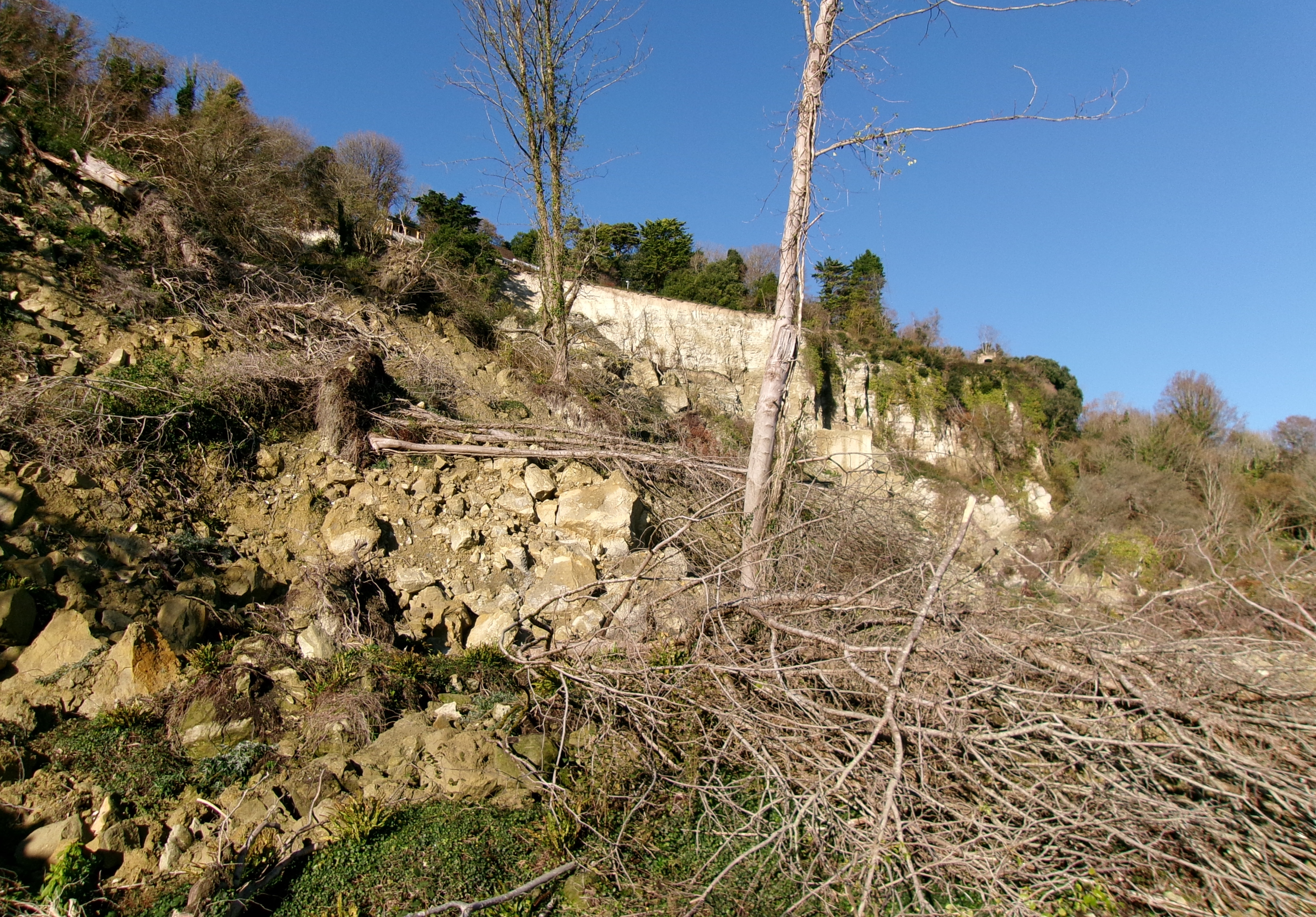
Aftermath of December 2023 fall

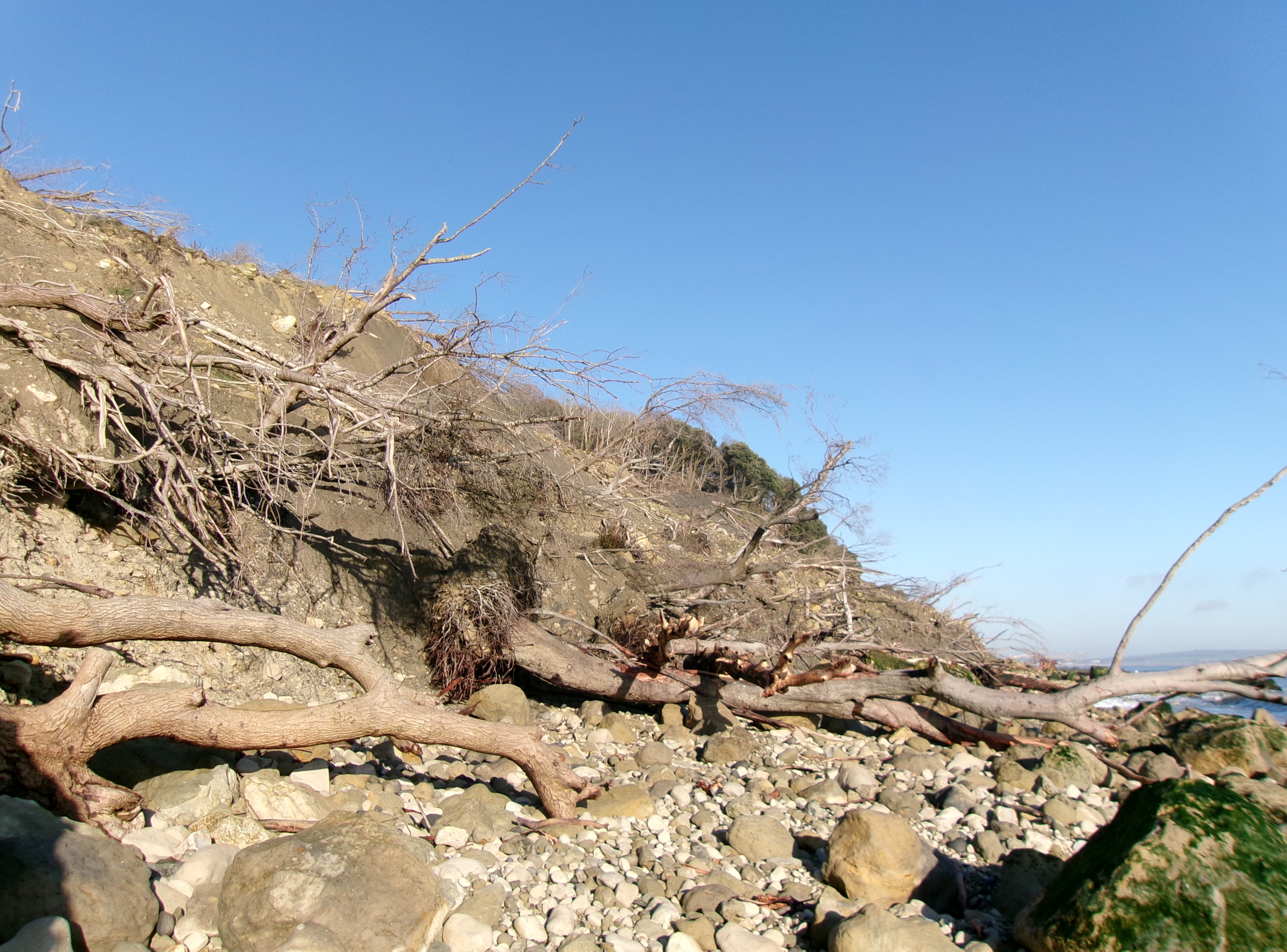
Coastline at the base of the landslip, showing debris brought down by the 2023 fall

A further major landslip, the worst on the island since 1994, took place on the evening of 10 December 2023. Ground movement had occurred over October and November with wet weather throughout August being blamed. Following the December landslide, the nearby Leeson Road was immediately closed with 20 households being evacuated. An area of former woodland extending about a quarter of a mile along the coast beneath the cliff, including picturesque woodland paths, and incorporating part of the Isle of Wight Coastal Path, was completely obliterated. It was initially reported that the Devil's Chimney, a scenic rock cleft, had been destroyed, but subsequent footage appears to show that it remains intact, although now inaccessible to the public. The Wishing Seat and the "Chink", both of which are located to the north of the destroyed area, also survived the landslip, though these too are inaccessible as the paths to them have been closed for safety reasons.

== Cultural references ==
The 1847 religious story The Old Man's Home by William Adams features a description of the East End landslip in the 1840s after its vegetation was re-established.
