= Henry Beaumont Leeson =

British doctor and chemist (1803–1872)

Henry Beaumont Leeson (1803–1872) was a British physician and chemist. His name is now known for a piece of optical apparatus.

== Life ==
He was the son of Robert Leeson of Nottingham, and was educated at King's Cliffe school, Hammersmith, and Repton School. He matriculated at Caius College, Cambridge in 1822, graduating B.A. in 1826, and M.A. in 1829.

Leeson studied medicine at St Thomas's Hospital in London, and graduated M.D. in 1840, at the University of Oxford. From 1840 to 1852 he acted as physician and lecturer on Chemistry and Forensic Medicine, at St Thomas's. He was Treasurer of the Cavendish Society, set up in 1846 to print chemical works; and was elected Fellow of the Royal Society in 1849. He belonged also to the Royal College of Physicians. and the Chemical Society.

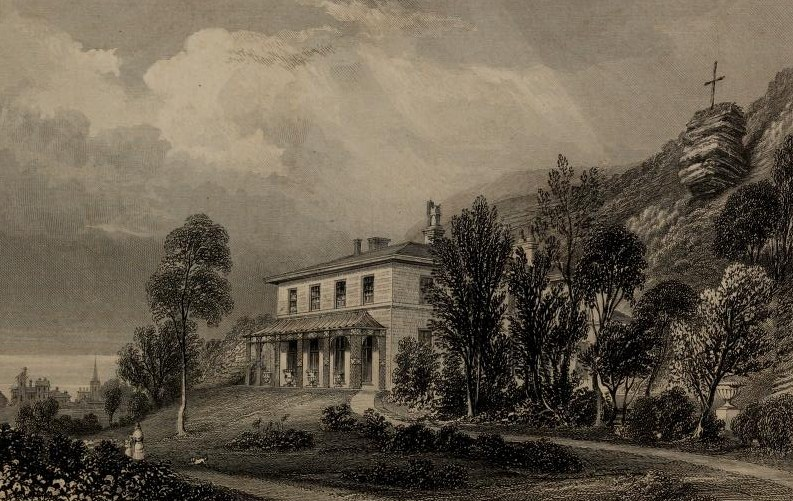
Pulpit Rock, Bonchurch, Isle of Wight; 1849 engraving by William Bernard Cooke.

Leeson retired to the Isle of Wight, and a villa at Pulpit Rock near Bonchurch. He owned and developed other properties in the area.

== Works ==
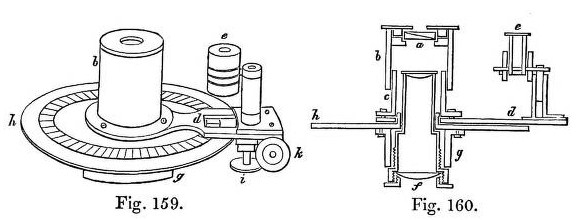
Views of a Leeson goniometer. The double refracting crystal was at a. From John Quekett's Practical Treatise on the Use of the Microscope (1852). The text comments that a Rochon prism could also be used.

In 1843 he published a paper on circular polarisation of light and various essential oils. His optical apparatus was innovative, and he developed a double refracting goniometer, also known as a Leeson prism. It was made from Iceland spar, and later applied to the measurement of angles in small crystals. The invention became standard. Leeson's goniometer, to be fitted to a microscope eyepiece, was illustrated in Knight's New Mechanical Dictionary (1884); and its measurement technique, by bringing two images of a crystal into coincidence, was still explained in a text of 1921. Leeson is also credited with the first rotation apparatus for orienting a crystal.
