= Luccombe, Isle of Wight =

Hamlet on the Isle of Wight, England

Coordinates: 50.615°N 1.177°W

Luccombe: Luccombe Village
- Hamlet
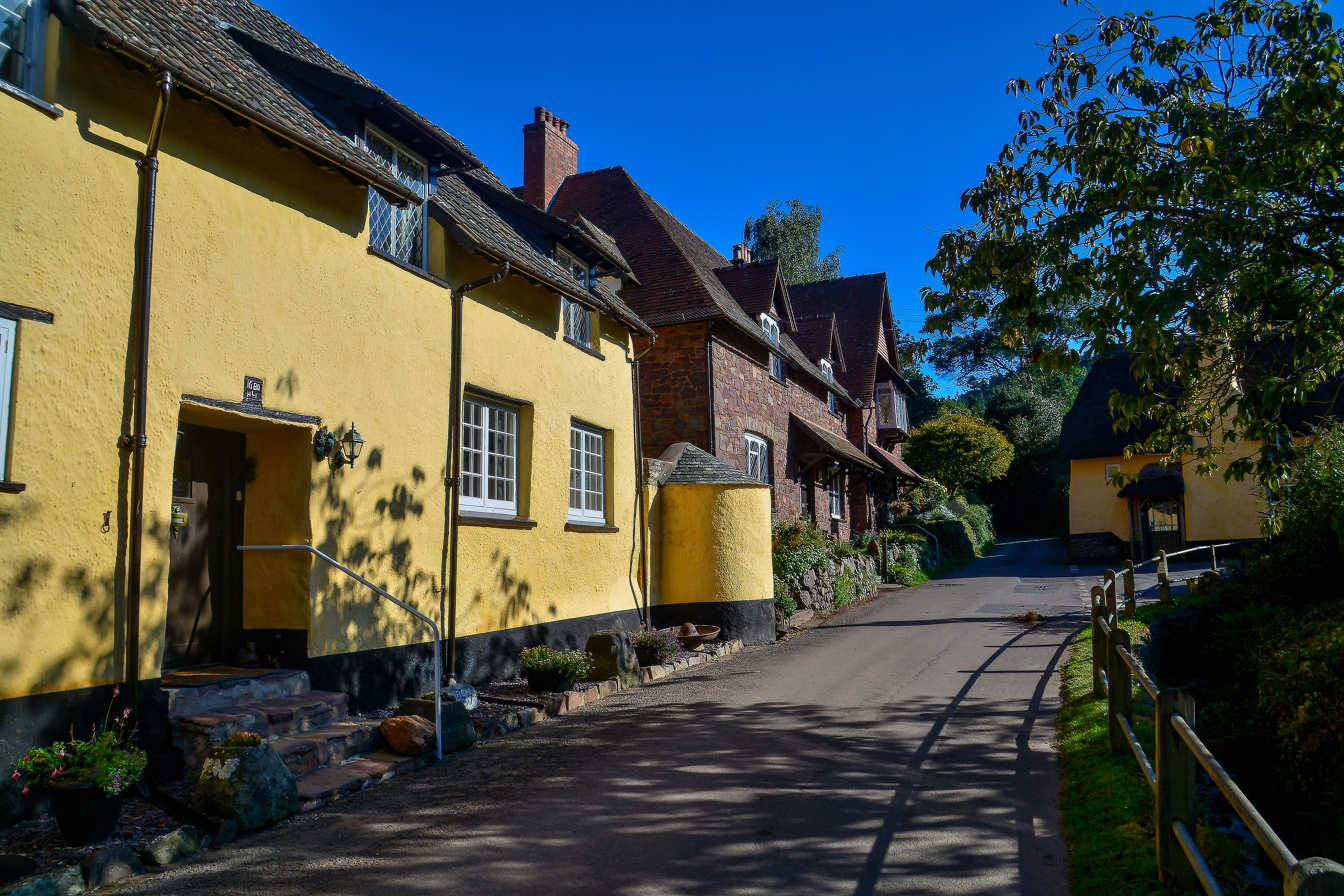
- The hamlet of Luccombe

- Location within the Isle of Wight
- OS grid reference: SZ5827079855
- Civil parish: Shanklin
- Unitary authority: Isle of Wight
- Ceremonial county: Isle of Wight
- Region: South East
- Country: England
- Sovereign state: United Kingdom
- Post town: Shanklin
- Postcode district: PO
- Police: Hampshire and Isle of Wight
- Fire: Hampshire and Isle of Wight
- Ambulance: Isle of Wight

Luccombe (also known as Luccombe Village) is a hamlet a short distance south of Shanklin, on the south coast of the Isle of Wight, England.

There is some indication of Bronze Age settlements on the top of the nearby hill of Luccombe Down.

== Name ==
The name is thought to mean 'the valley belonging to a man called Lufa' from Old English Lufa (Old English personal name) and cumb. However, the first part of the name could be lufu (love). The name also occurs in Somerset.

1086: Lovecumbe

1141-1143: Louecumba

1258: Luvecumbe

1291: Lovecombe

1611: Luckome

1769: Luccumb

Luccombe gives its name to Luccombe Chine.

== Nature ==
The Luccombe area features spectacular cliffs and scenery. It is a popular site for hang gliding and paragliding if there is an easterly wind of around 12 mph and it is low water, and on good days flights to Sandown and back can be achieved.

Luccombe forms the east end of the Ventnor Undercliff region, which extends for 12 kilometres from Blackgang to Luccombe, also encompassing the town of Ventnor and the villages of Bonchurch, St Lawrence, and Niton. There is some concern that the Ventnor Undercliff area is experiencing substantial coastal erosion.

== Amenities ==
Public transport is provided by Southern Vectis bus route 3, which runs between Newport, Ryde, Sandown, Shanklin and Ventnor.
