= Freshwater Redoubt =

Palmerston fort in Freshwater, Isle of Wight, England

- Freshwater, Isle of Wight, England
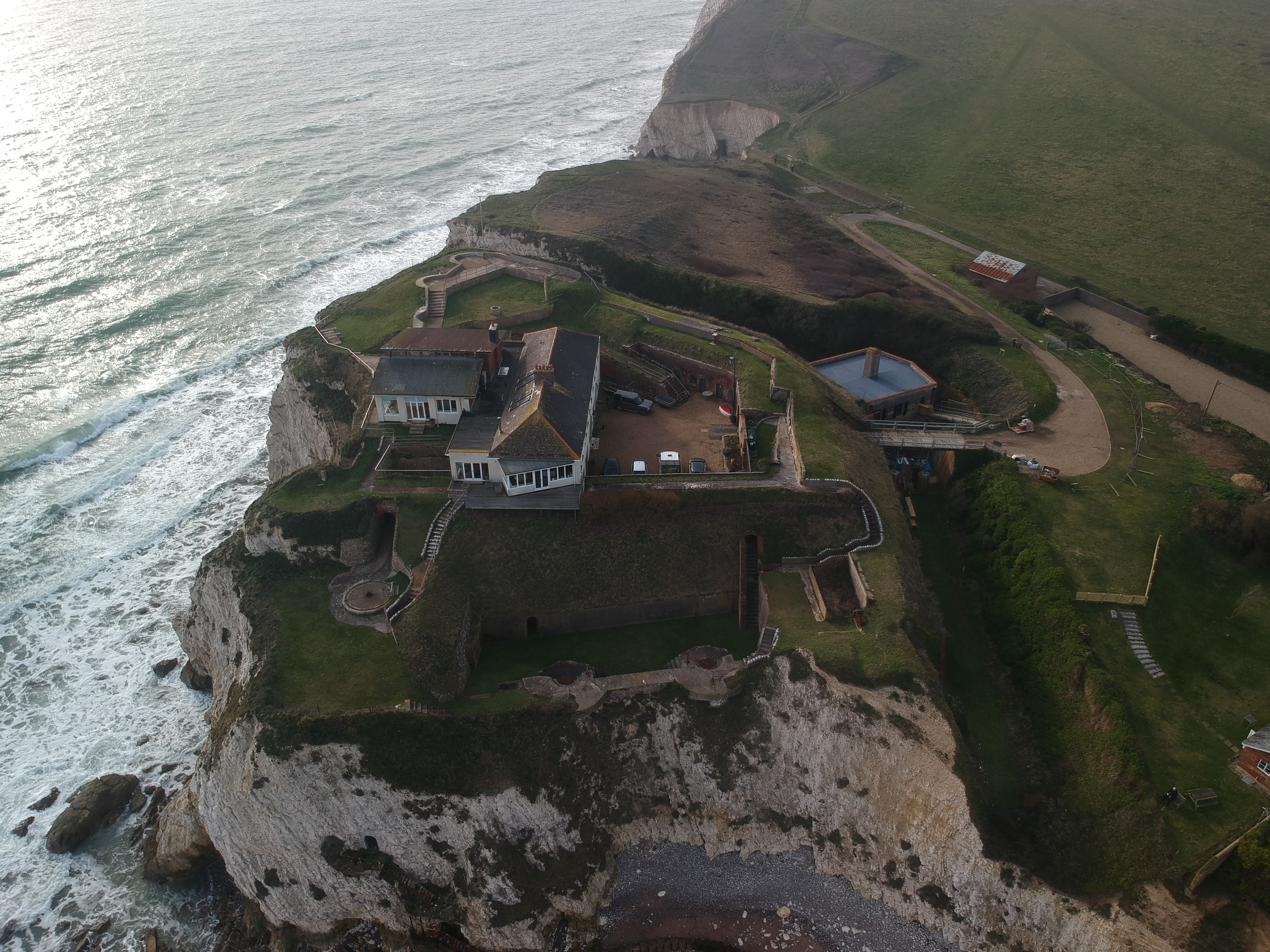
- Fort Redoubt on the cliff of Freshwater Bay.

Site information
- Owner: Private residence
- Open to the public: No

Location
- Coordinates: 50°40′10″N 1°30′45″W

Site history
- Built: 1855-1856
- In use: 1856-1928
- Materials: Brick

Freshwater Redoubt, also known as Fort Redoubt (map reference SZ345856), is an old Palmerston fort built in Freshwater Bay on the western end of the Isle of Wight. Construction work for the fort began in 1855 and was completed in 1856. It was finally sold in 1928 and has now been converted into a private residence.

== Army use ==
Freshwater Redoubt is a Palmerston fort, completed in 1856 to defend Freshwater Bay, which was a possible landing beach for enemy troops. The deep, dry ditch protects the landward approaches.

The Caponier building in the ditch served as barrack accommodation for 24 men. With its iron window-shutters and rifle slots the Caponier also provided a means of ditch defence. The original bridge had a section, which could be withdrawn, near the entrance gate, for defence purposes. The main building, visible through the gate, was originally a single storey, flat-roofed barrack comprising 3 Officers’ Rooms, an Officers’ Kitchen, Staff Sergeant's Quarters, and 2 rooms for 5 and 11 men.

The fort was designed with 2 batteries for a total of 7 guns. The Upper Battery, facing the sea, had four gun emplacements and a separate Lower Battery with three gun emplacements covered Freshwater Bay. Early muzzle-loading guns, using gunpowder and firing cannonballs, were replaced over the years by rifled, breech-loading guns firing shells as military technology advanced.

=== Gun Incident in June 1901 ===
Fort Redoubt was the site of a tragic gunnery accident on June 25, 1901, during a training exercise involving a 12-pounder quick-firing (QF) gun. The fort was serving as an instruction battery for the nearby Golden Hill Fort school of gunnery at the time.

A detachment of the Southern Division, Royal Artillery, was conducting firing practice at moving targets in Freshwater Bay when the breech block of one of the 12-pounder QF guns unexpectedly blew out. The explosion resulted in the immediate deaths of four soldiers and caused severe injuries, including loss of limbs, to six others. The deceased were:

- Captain Arthur Le Mesurier Bray (aged 33)
- Gunner Charles Dornan (aged 20)
- Gunner Charles Rickets (aged 29)
- Bombardier Murdoch Macdonald (aged 23)

All four fallen soldiers were stationed at Golden Hill Fort and were subsequently buried in the cemetery of All Saints Church, Freshwater. The incident was widely reported, and a large military funeral involving over 1,500 soldiers parading through Freshwater was held to honour the deceased.

The exact cause of the breech block failure was investigated, though the detailed findings are not widely publicized. The incident underscored the inherent dangers of artillery training and had a profound impact on the local military community. The memory of the soldiers killed in the accident has been preserved through local efforts, including the ongoing care of their graves by the current residents of Freshwater Redoubt.

Page from The Navy and Army Illustrated magazine showing an article about a gun accident at Freshwater in 1901, including photographs of a group of Garrison Artillery and the funeral procession

The incident was reported in "The Navy and Army Illustrated" 13th July, 1901 edition

== Location ==
The fort is on the Western headland of Freshwater Bay at the foot of Tennyson Down. It enjoys outstanding views of Freshwater Bay to the East and the English Channel to the South and West, with the Solent visible to the North across Freshwater and Yarmouth. The view from the top of the drive is of the Isle of Wight coast running along Compton Bay, with Brighstone Down beyond and continues past Atherfield Point, Chale and Blackgang, towards St. Catherine's Point, with St. Boniface Down in the distance. The small tower visible on the rocks off Hanover Point is an artillery range marker built by the Army. The guns would always fire to seaward of this point

== Recent history ==
The fort is known locally as Fort Redoubt. It was sold by the Army in 1928 and is privately owned. The main building was converted into a two-storey private residence in 1936, and further extended in 1976 but not finished. During the 1980s and 1990s it operated as a tea room. The current owners have completed their own accommodation in the main building and carried out landscaping improvements in the grounds to recover the original setting of the property. The bridge over the moat was replaced in 2011 and, like the original bridge, affords a view of the Caponier along the moat.

The restoration of the Caponier was completed in 2020, and is now holiday lets.

Moonfleet cottage in the grounds was originally married quarters accommodation for the master gunner and is now a holiday cottage. Since 1994, it has been a Grade II Listed Building.

In 2005, Peter White wrote Moonfleet the opera, based on the story of Moonfleet by J. Meade Falkner, while staying at Fort Redoubt.

== Caponier restoration (2014-2020) ==
The Caponier building in the ditch had originally served as barrack accommodation for 24 men. By 2000 the roof and floors had been removed at some time in the past (possibly for sale of the timber) and all that was left was the brick walls. When the ivy that had grown rampantly over the walls was removed, the render to the external brickwork was found to be in good condition, along with the structural brick work.

The Caponier is accessed from the courtyard via a brick tunnel and down 19 steps before arriving at the upper floor of the 2 floor Caponier building - posing practical and logistical challenges for getting materials and furniture in and out. In 2014 renovation of the Caponier building began by stabilising the brick work, and installing a new insulated flat roof and a new first floor. Works continued on and off until 2017 when the period timber sash windows and shutters were installed - making the building weather proof for the first time in over 40 years. In 2018 works began again to convert the weather proof shell into 2 three bedroom holiday lets. During the last phase of the works, a scaffold bridge was built from the North Side of the bridge, across to the North West upper floor window (pictured in gallery). This temporary structure was removed when the works concluded in 2020.

Every effort has been made to retain the authentic history of the Caponier building despite modern fixtures and fittings. The original metal hooks used to hang soldiers hammocks from have been retained throughout; The gun slits (Embrasure) have been retained and glazed keeping the original lines of sight; the original 2 foot thick brick walls have been exposed emphasising the original military purpose of the building.

== Further images ==
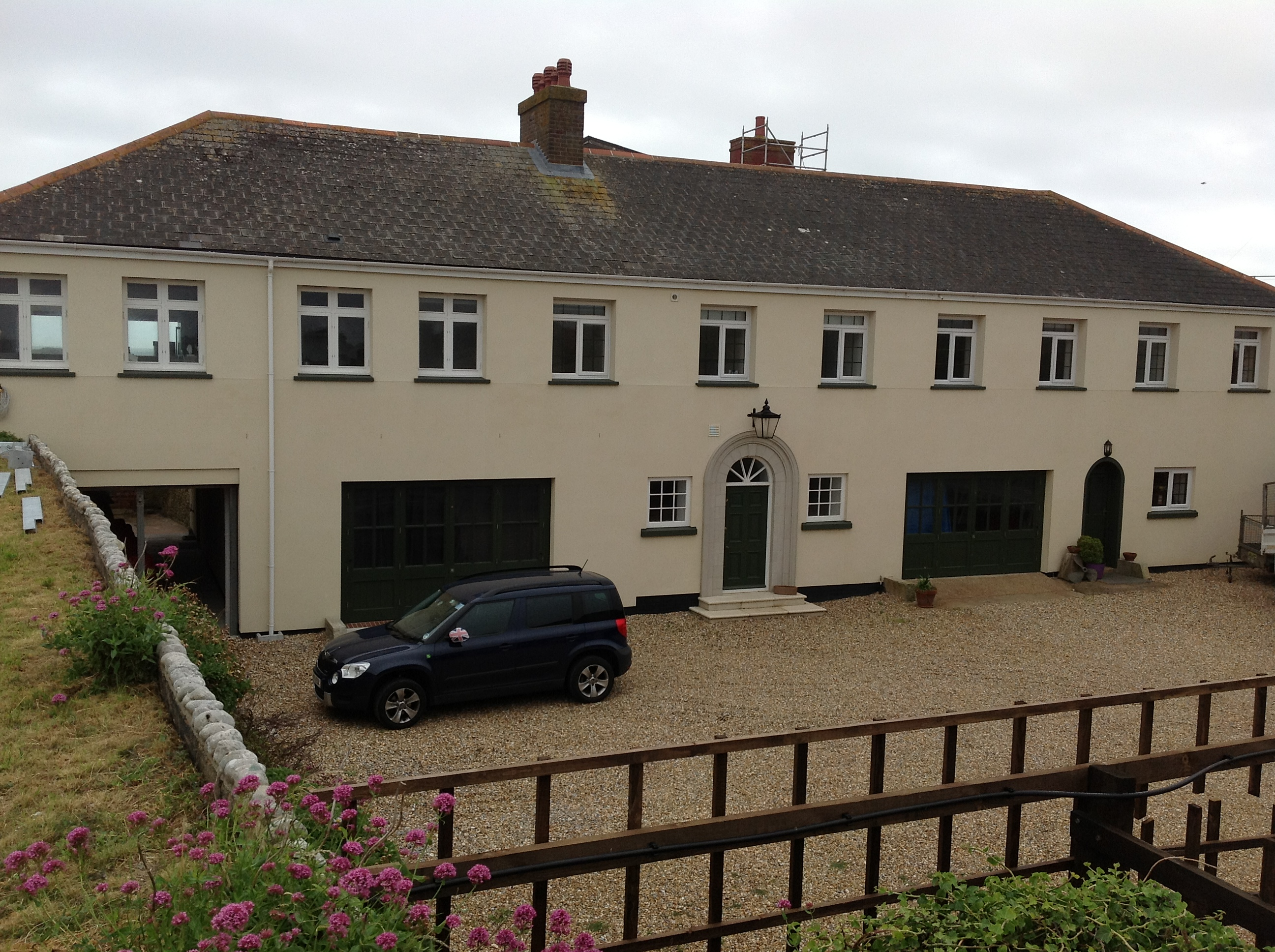
Courtyard January 2013

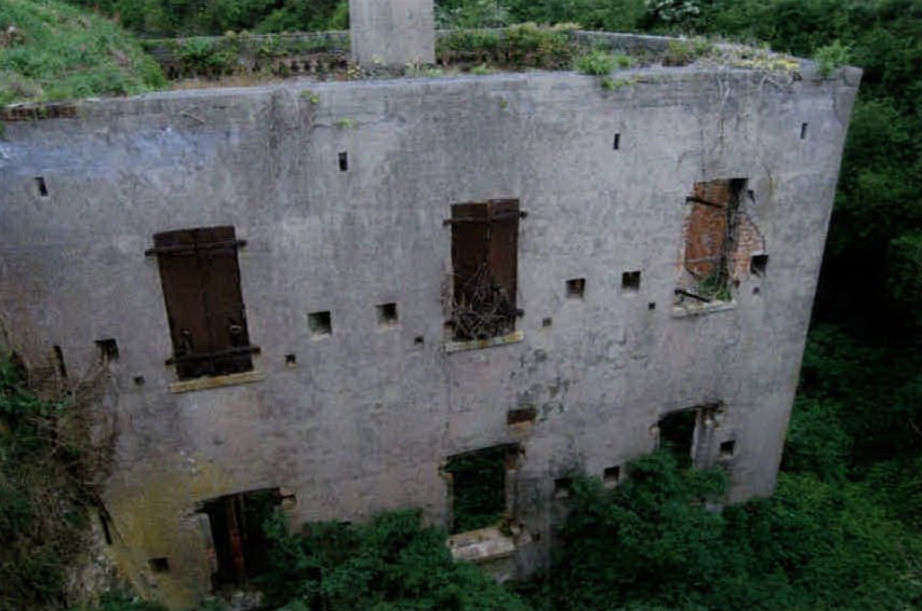
Deralict Caponier 2008

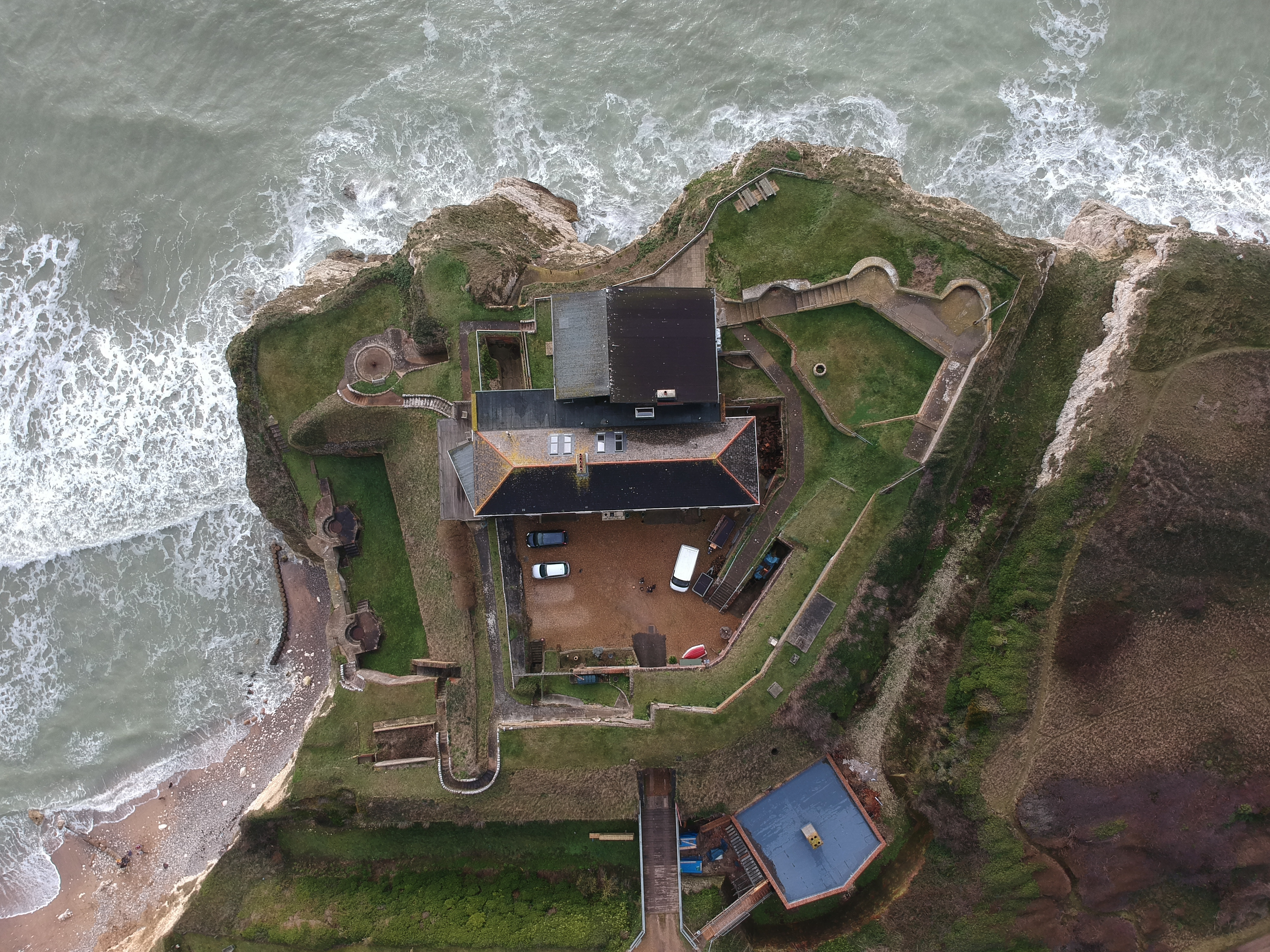
Aerial Photo of Freshwater Redoubt Feb 2018

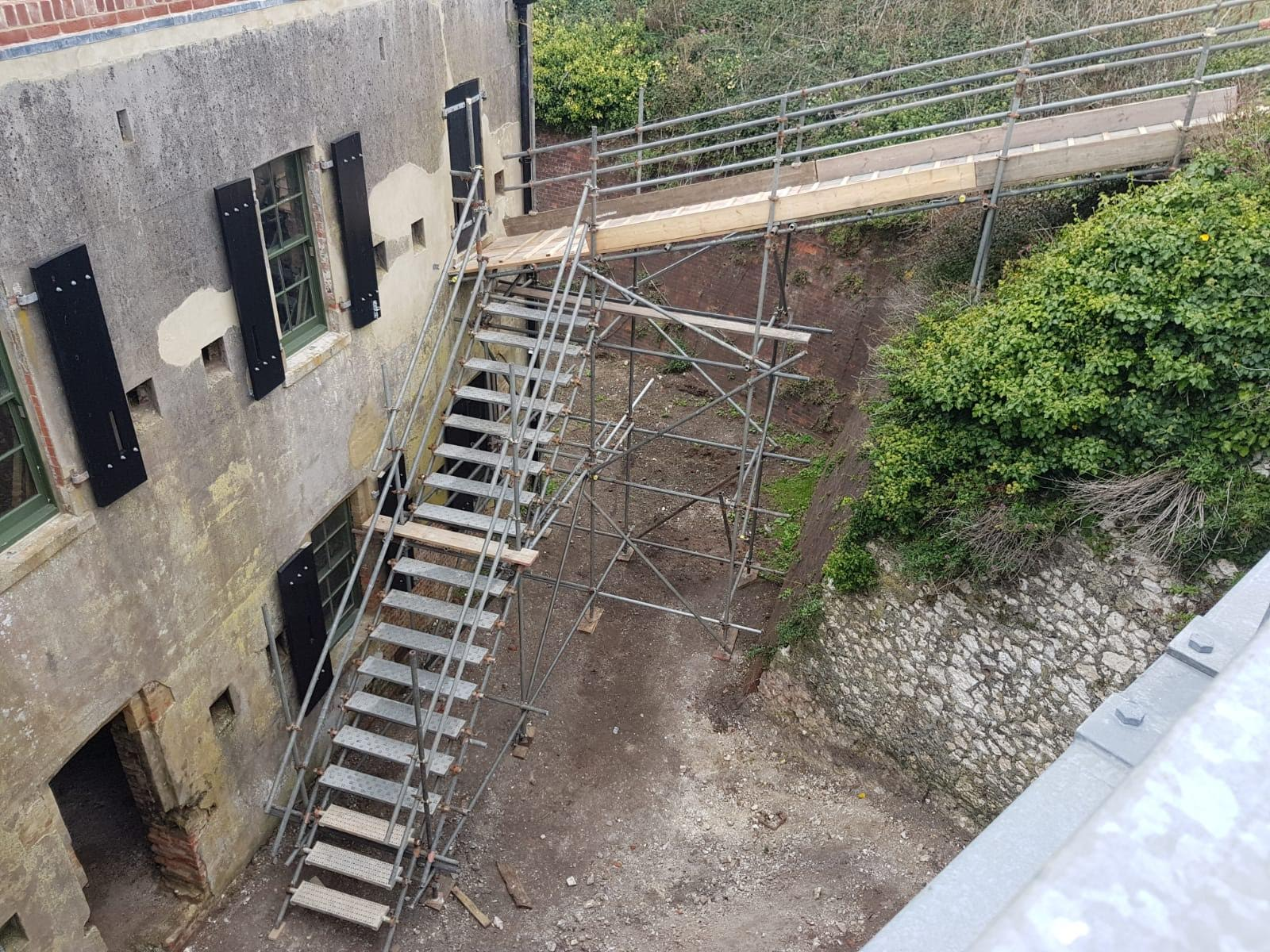
Scaffold bridge to facilitate caponier

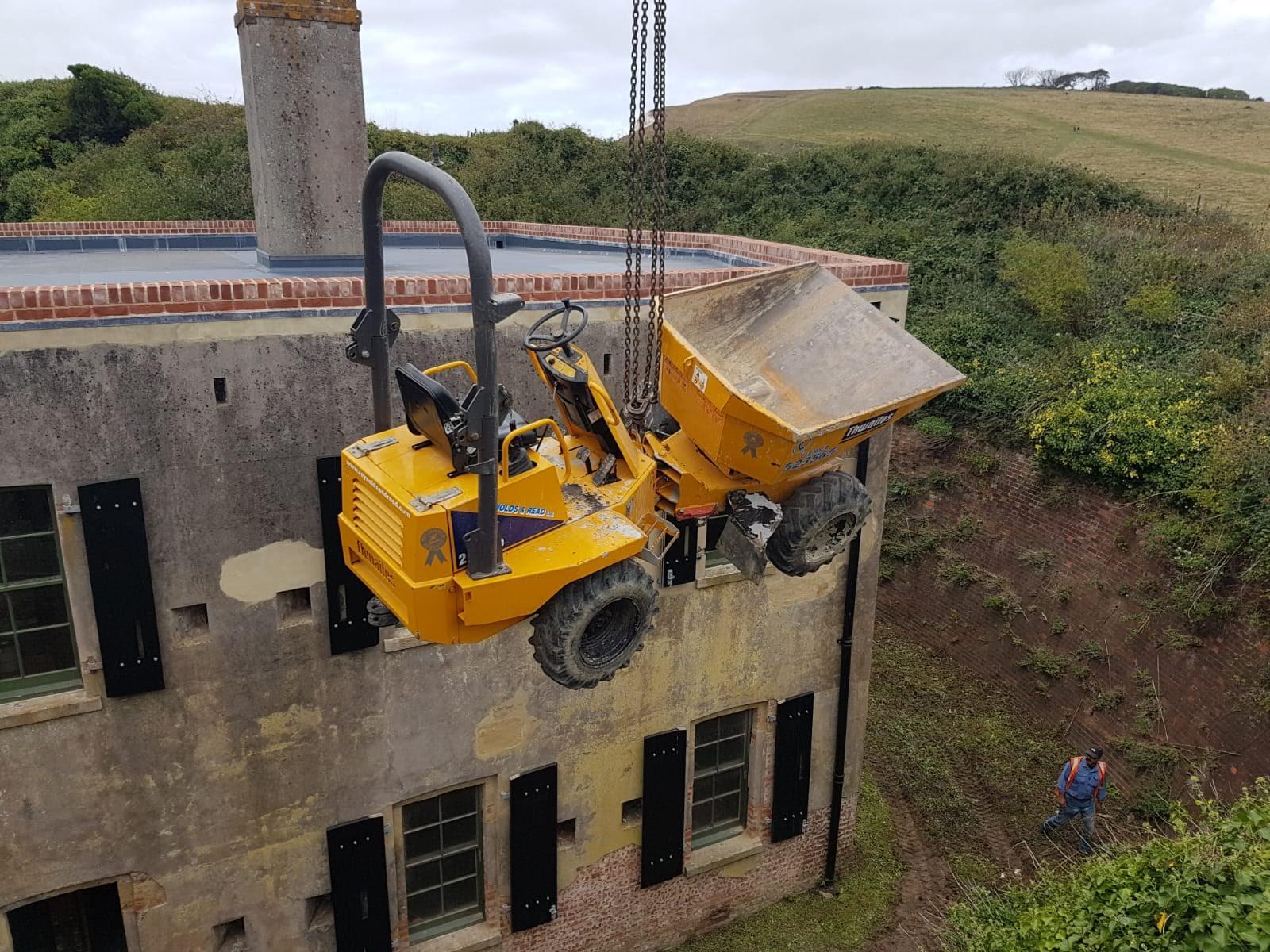

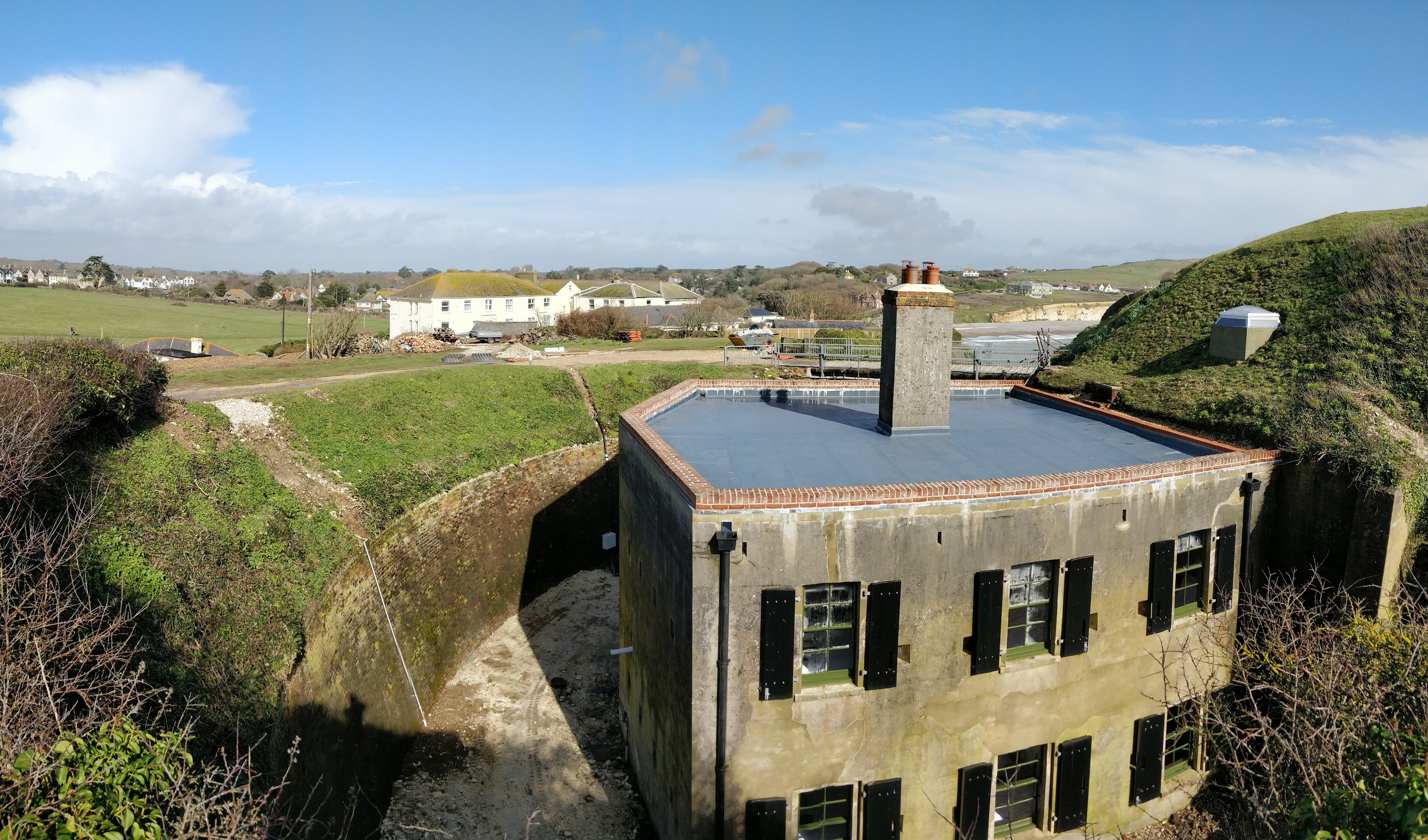
Caponier 2020 from West looking East

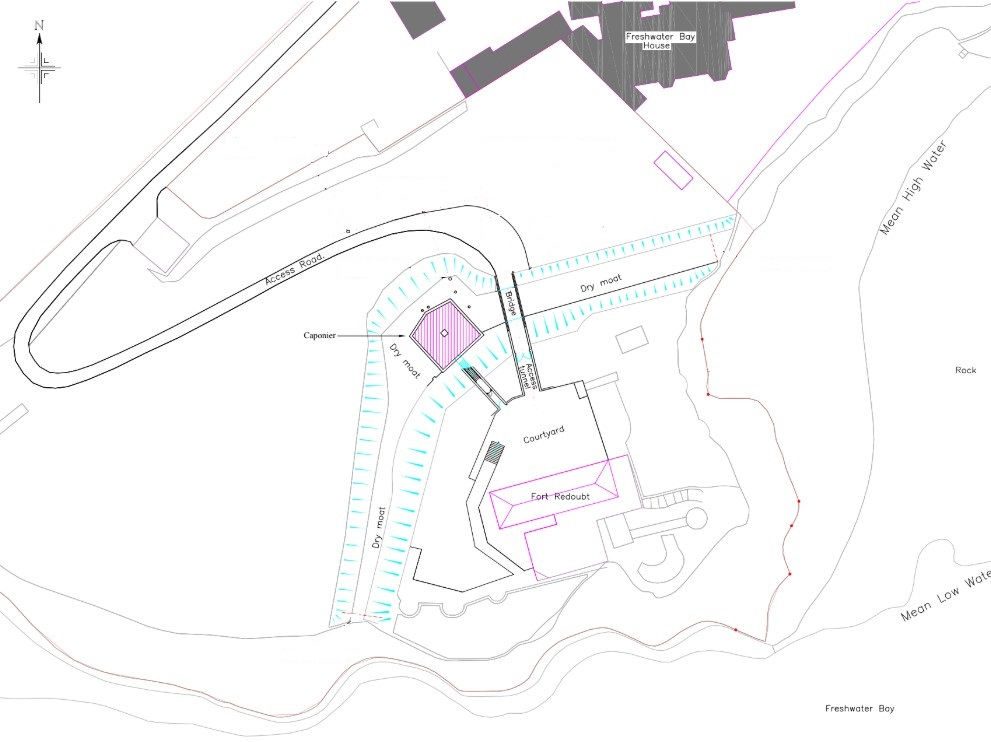
Plan of Freshwater Redoubt

== Publications ==
- Cantwell, Anthony (1986). The Needles Defences. Isle of Wight: Solent Papers. ISBN 1870113012.
