= List of hills of the Isle of Wight =

This is a list of hills on the Isle of Wight. Many of these hills are important historical, archaeological and nature conservation sites, as well as popular hiking and tourist destinations on the Isle of Wight in southern England.

== Colour key ==
Class	Prominence
Marilyns	150 – 599 m
HuMPs	100 – 149 m
TuMPs	30 – 99 m
Unclassified	0 – 29 m

The table is colour-coded based on the classification or "listing" of the hill. The types that occur on the Isle of Wight are Marilyns, HuMPs and TuMPs, listings based on topographical prominence. "Prominence" correlates strongly with the subjective significance of a summit. Peaks with low prominences are either subsidiary tops of a higher summit or relatively insignificant independent summits. Peaks with high prominences tend to be the highest points around and likely to have extraordinary views. A Marilyn is a hill with a prominence of at least 150 metres or about 500 feet. A "HuMP" (the acronym comes from "Hundred Metre Prominence) is a hill with a prominence of at least 100 but less than 150 metres. In this table Marilyns are in beige and HuMPs in lilac. A "TuMP" as defined here is a hill with a prominence of at least 30 but less than 100 metres. The term "sub-Marilyn" or "sub-HuMP" is used, e.g. in the online Database of British and Irish Hills to indicate hills that fall just below the threshold. To qualify for inclusion, hills must either be 100 metres or higher with a prominence of at least 30 metres, below 100 metres they must be in some way notable. For further information see the Lists of mountains and hills in the British Isles and the individual articles on Marilyns, HuMPs, and TuMPs. In this context, "TuMP" is used to connote a hill with a prominence of at least 30 but less than 100 metres. By way of contrast, see also the article listing Tumps (a traditional term meaning a hillock, mound, barrow or tumulus).

== List of hills ==
Hill	Height (m)	Prom. (m)	Grid ref.	Class	Parent	Range/Region	Remarks	Image
St Boniface Down	241	241	SZ568785	Marilyn, HuMP, TuMP, Isle of Wight county top (historical and current)		Southwest of the island.	Isle of Wight county top. Above steep cliffs dropping down to coastal village of Bonchurch	
St Catherine's Hill	239	127	SZ493772	HuMP, TuMP	St Boniface Down	Southern tip of the island.	Isle of Wight's second highest hill. Tumulus 35 metres south of trig point.	
Appuldurcombe Down	226	91	SZ536796	TuMP, sub-HuMP	St Boniface Down	Southwest of the island.	Very flat summit area.	
Brighstone Down	214	150	SZ432847	Marilyn, HuMP, TuMP	St Boniface Down	West of the island.	Trig point at summit.	
Harboro	203	78	SZ406847	TuMP	Brighstone Down	West of the island.	Tumulus at summit.	
Chillerton Down	167	61	SZ475834	TuMP	Brighstone Down	West of the island.	Summit 2m from trig point which is in a depression.	
Brook Down	164	69	SZ390852	TuMP	Brighstone Down	West of the island.	Barrows and tumulus near summit.	
Whitwell Hill	158	45	SZ520766 (est.)	TuMP	St Boniface Down	South of the island.	Open downland above the coast.	
Chillerton Down South Top	148	35	SZ475826	HuMP, TuMP, sub-Marilyn	Brighstone Down	West of the island.	No summit feature; 20 metres ENE of Tennyson's Monument.	
Tennyson Down	147	145	SZ475826	HuMP, TuMP, sub-Marilyn	Brighstone Down	Southwest of the island.	No summit feature; ground on fenceline.	
West High Down	141	30	SZ306849	TuMP	Brighstone Down	Western tip of the island.	Summit 1 metre E of marker stone.	
Grammar's Common	137	35	SZ415837 (est.)	TuMP	Brighstone Down	Southwest of the island.	Wooded summit.	
Arreton Down	135	108	SZ526840	HuMP, TuMP	Brighstone Down	East of centre of the island.	Trig point at summit.	
Berry Hill	134	35	SZ484827	TuMP	Brighstone Down	Southwest centre of the island.	No summit feature; ground on fenceline.	
Brading Down	131	58	SZ585869	TuMP	St Boniface Down	East of the island.	Obvious grassy summit. In the vicinity are the site of a Roman villa, field systems, a vineyard, the Devil's Punch Bowl and Nunwell House	
Ashey Down	130	32	SZ574875	TuMP	St Boniface Down	East of the island.	Open summit on south side of obelisk (sea mark. Nearby tumuli.	
Headon Hill	120	34	SZ312858	TuMP	Brighstone Down	Western tip of the island.	Open summit above steep hillside overlooking Totland Bay.	
Bembridge Down	104	101	SZ625860	HuMP, TuMP	St Boniface Down	Eastern coast of the island.	Bembridge Fort at summit. Nearby road and car park. Overlooking Sandown Bay.	
Golden Hill	52	34	SZ339878	TuMP	Brighstone Down	Western end of the island.	Golden Hill Fort at the summit, which is on circular bank around former fortress.	

== See also ==
- List of mountains and hills of the United Kingdom
- List of Marilyns in England
