= The Needles Batteries =

Historic military defence sites on Isle of Wight, England

- The Needles, Isle of Wight, England
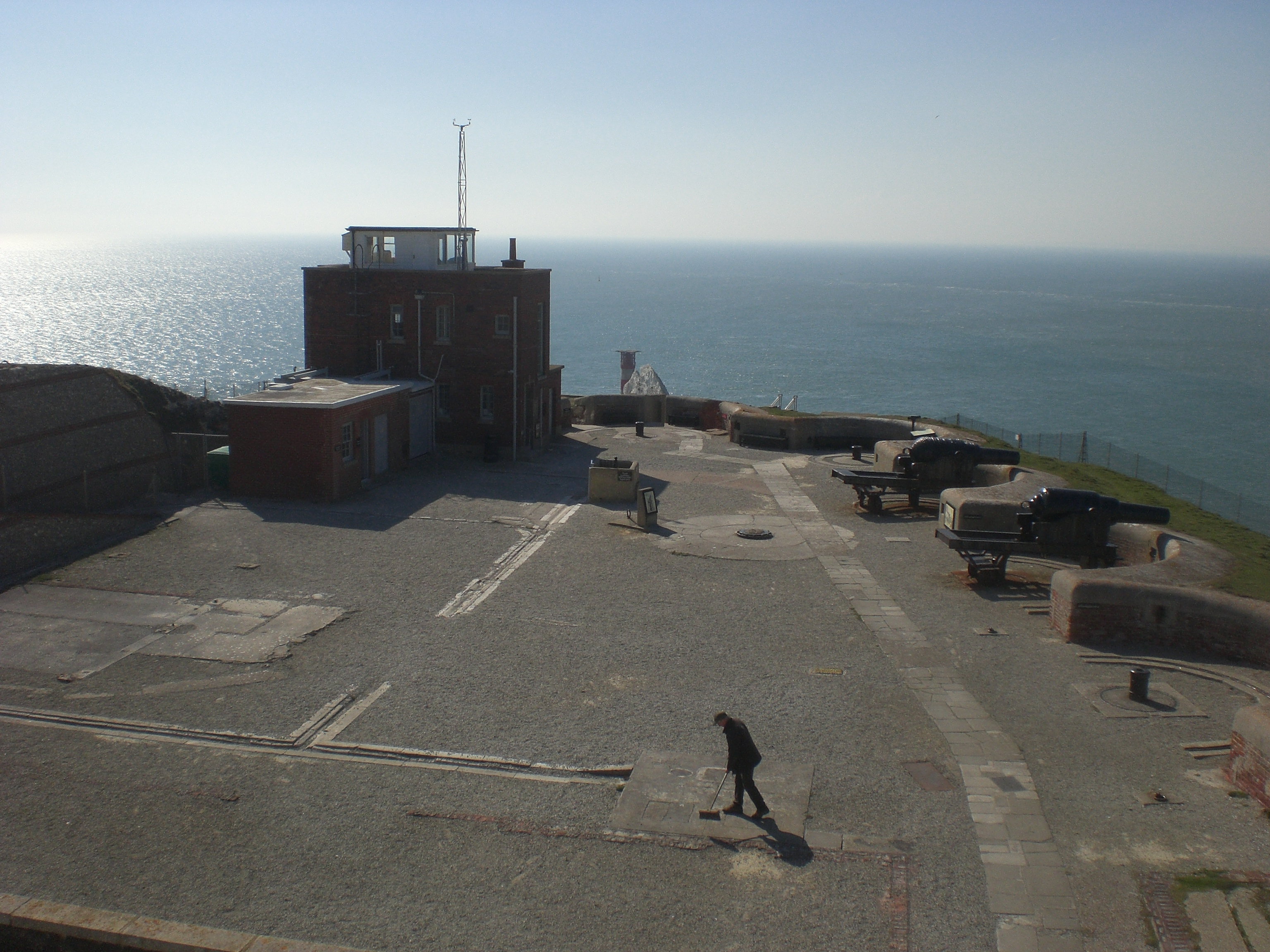
- The view over the old battery

Site information
- Owner: National Trust
- Open to the public: Yes

Location
- Coordinates: 50°39′44″N 1°35′02″W

Site history
- Built: 1861–63 (old); 1895 (new)
- In use: 1863 onwards
- Materials: Brick and flint
- Battles/wars: World War I and World War II
- Events: Anti-aircraft gun trials Blue Streak tests

Listed Building – Grade II
- Official name: Old Needles Battery
- Designated: 28 March 1994
- Reference no.: 1220402

Listed Building – Grade II
- Official name: New Needles Battery
- Designated: 28 March 1994
- Reference no.: 1209415

Scheduled monument
- Official name: New Battery and High Down Test Site, The Needles
- Designated: 31 July 2015
- Reference no.: 1422839

The Needles Batteries are two military batteries built above the Needles stacks to guard the West end of the Solent. The field of fire was from approximately West South West clockwise to Northeast and they were designed to defend against enemy ships.

== Old Battery ==
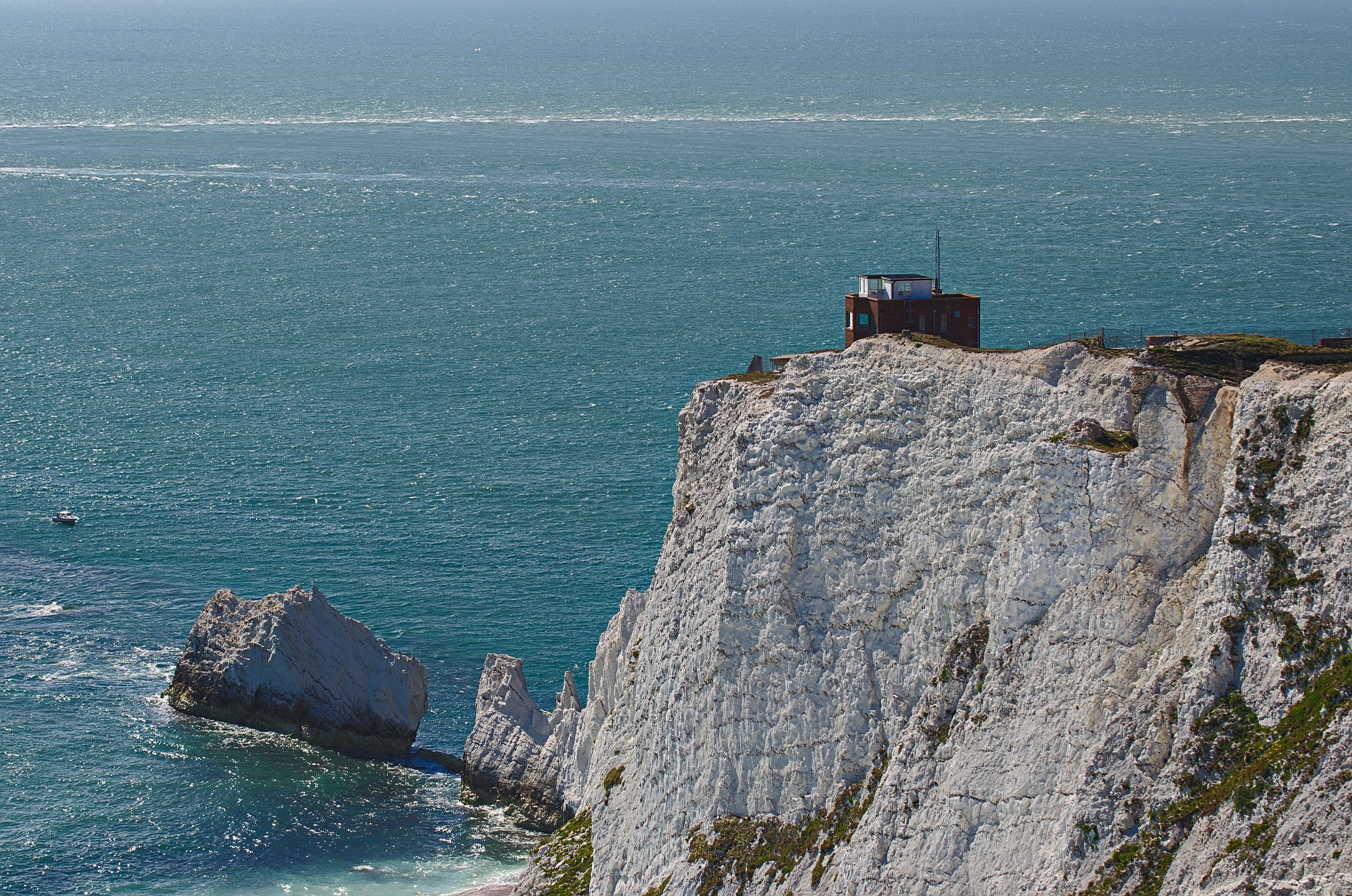
The Old Battery near The Needles at the western end of the Isle of Wight. Photo taken from the viewpoint near the New Battery.

The Old Battery was constructed between 1861 and 1863. It was equipped with six 7-inch Armstrong rifled breechloading guns. These were replaced by four 7-inch and two 9-inch rifled muzzle loaders in 1872, and six 9-inch rifled muzzle loaders in 1893. The 9 inch guns took a team of 9 men to load and fire. These guns fired projectiles weighing 256 pounds (116 kg). The 9-inch guns remained in place until 1903 when they were discarded by throwing them over the side of the cliff. These were later recovered and two are now on display at the Old Battery.

A deep ditch with a retractable bridge was dug into the chalk to protect the facility from ground attack from the island side. In 1885 a tunnel was dug towards the cliff face from the parade grounds. An elevator down to the beach was completed in 1887. Early searchlight experiments were conducted at the site between 1889 and 1892. The present observation post housing a searchlight was built in 1899. Just to the east of the Old Battery, at Hatherwood Point are the remains of Hatherwood Battery, built to defend the area alongside the Needles Battery. The Old Battery is a Grade II Listed Building.

A tunnel leads to a searchlight emplacement with good views towards the Needles lighthouse.

== New Battery ==
There were subsidence problems and concerns that the concussion from firing the guns was causing the cliffs to crumble. This was solved by building the New Battery higher up the cliff, at a height of 120 metres above sea level. The New Battery was completed in 1895. Three 9.2-inch Mk IX breech-loading guns were installed at the New Battery: two in 1900 and a third in 1903. A crew of 11 was required to fire one of these guns. Each shell weighed 380 pounds (172 kg). The New Battery guns remained in place until 1954, when they were scrapped.

The Old and New Batteries were manned during the World Wars. German U-boats sank two ships off The Needles during World War I. This facility was also the site of early trials of anti-aircraft guns. In World War II, anti-aircraft guns defended the Isle of Wight against air attacks but repeated German air attacks necessitated improvements in the fortifications at the site. Troops trained for the D-Day landing on the neighbouring cliffs. After the war, the Ministry of Defence deactivated the batteries.

In the 1950s, test stands near the battery were used for testing the Blue Streak missile, as well as the Black Knight and Black Arrow satellite launch vehicles. Like the Old Battery, the New Battery has also been listed at Grade II. The surviving parts of the rocket testing facilities are a scheduled monument.

== National Trust opening ==
When the site came into the possession of the National Trust, it was decided to restore the Old Battery so that it could be opened to the general public. The National Trust Youth Group comprising local schoolchildren and teachers assisted in preparing the site for its official opening in 1982. The site is still managed by the National Trust and is open daily from mid-March to the end of October. It gives visitors an insight into how a Victorian battery would work and giving a glimpse into the life of a soldier based at the Battery during the Second World War. Along with a series of exhibition rooms and the tunnel there are a number of visitor facilities including a tearoom. The New Battery was opened to the public in 2004 and has a display on the history of the British rocket development between the 1950s and 1970s.

== Gallery ==
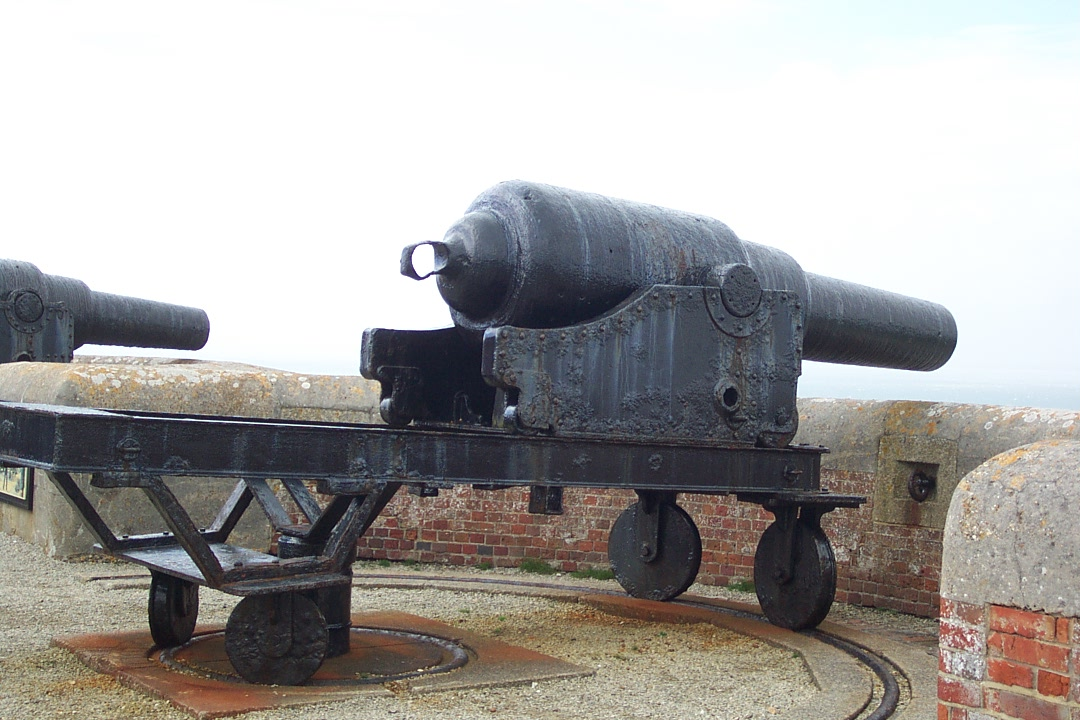
Gun emplacement at the Old Needles Battery

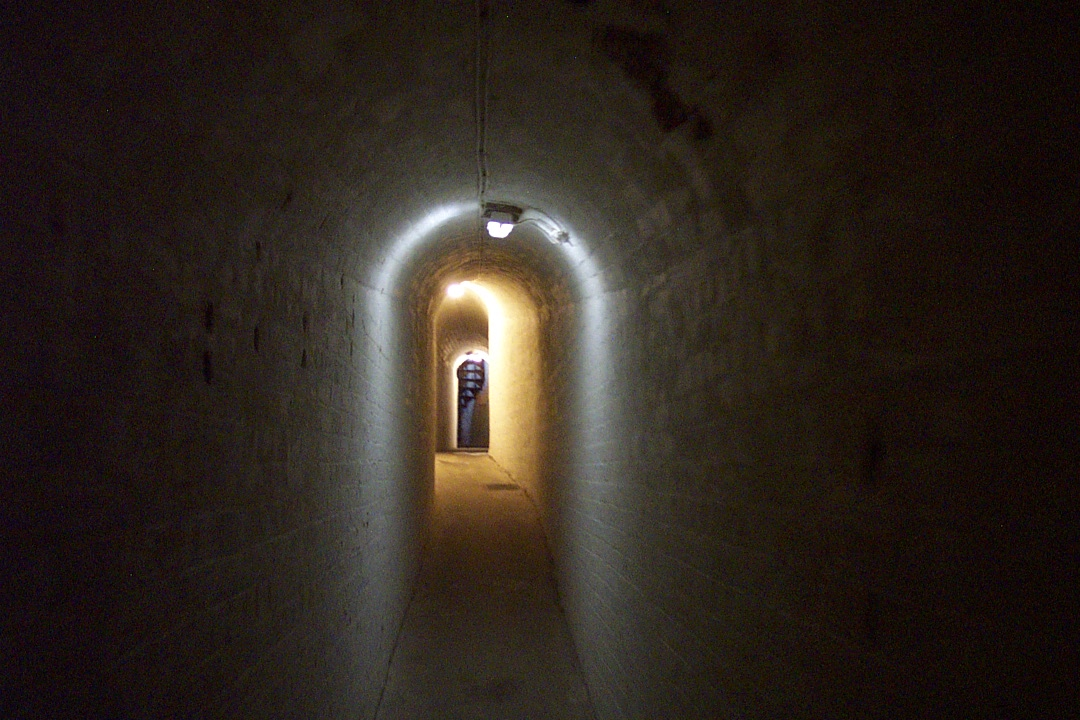
The tunnel, leading to the searchlight.

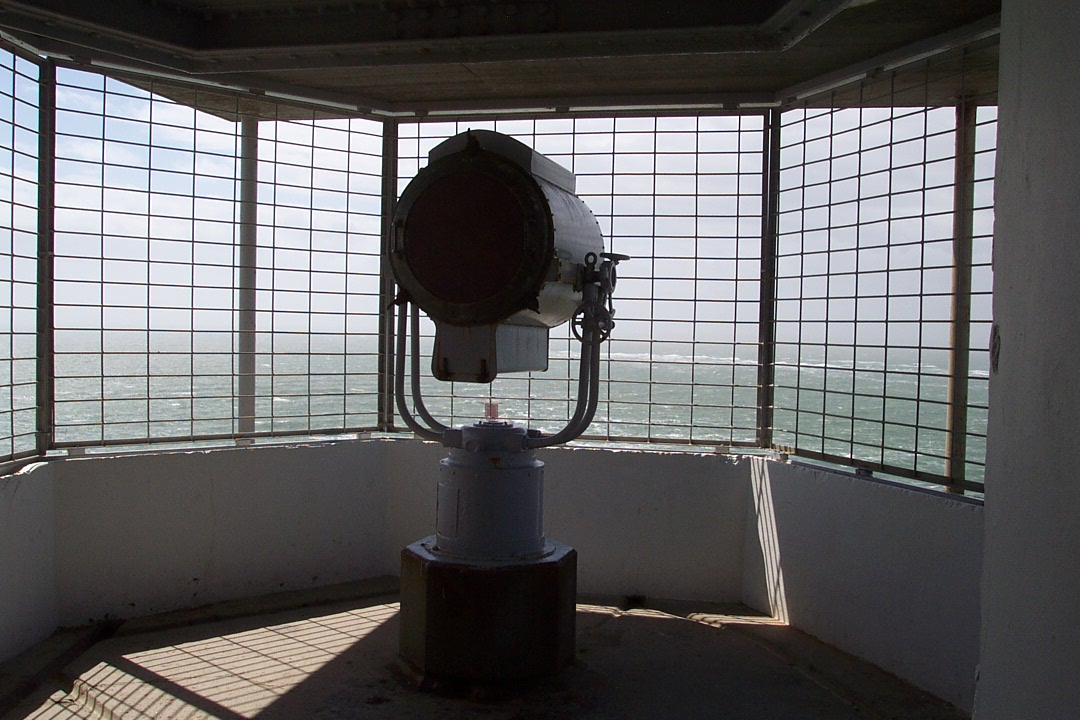
Searchlight at the end of the Searchlight Tunnel, Old Needles Battery

== Publications ==
- Cantwell, Anthony (1986). The Needles Defences. Isle of Wight: Solent Papers. ISBN 1870113012.
- Anthony Cantwell, "The Needles Battery", Fort, 1985 (Fortress Study Group), (13), pp69–89
