= St Catherine's Oratory =

Medieval lighthouse on St. Catherine's Down, Isle of Wight, England

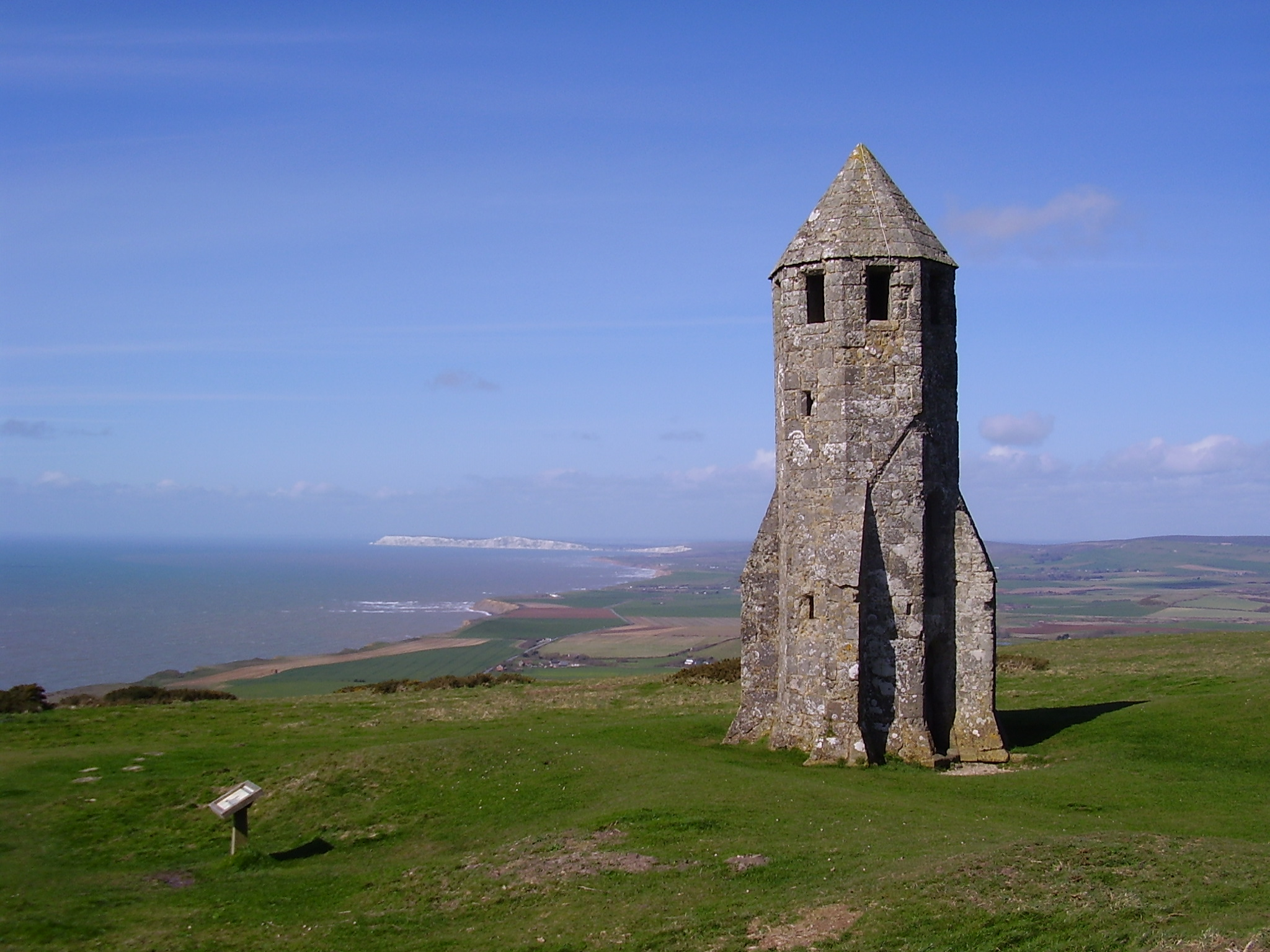
- The "Pepperpot" on St. Catherine's Hill.
- Location: St. Catherine's Down; Isle of Wight
- OS grid: SZ4936477278
- Coordinates: 50.593167°N 1.303889°W

Tower
- Constructed: 1328
- Construction: stone tower
- Height: 10.8 metres (35 ft)
- Shape: octagonal tower with pyramidal roof
- Operator: English Heritage
- Heritage: Grade II listed building

Light
- First lit: 1328
- Deactivated: 1547
- Focal height: 240 m (790 ft)

St. Catherine's Oratory is a medieval lighthouse on St. Catherine's Down, above the southern coast of the Isle of Wight. It was built by Lord of Chale Walter de Godeton (sometimes spelled "Goditon") as an act of penance for plundering wine from the wreck of St. Marie of Bayonne in Chale Bay on 20 April 1313. The tower is known locally as the "Pepperpot" because of its likeness to a pepper shaker.

== History ==
De Godeton was tried for theft in Southampton, before a jury from the island, and fined 287 and half marks on 27 February 1314. However, he was also later tried by the Church courts, since the wine had been destined for the monastery of Livers in Picardy. The Church threatened to excommunicate him unless he built a lighthouse near Chale Bay. There was already an oratory on the top of the hill, dedicated to St. Catherine of Alexandria. This was augmented by the construction of the lighthouse, with a chantry to accommodate the priest who tended the light, and also gave Mass for those at peril on the sea.

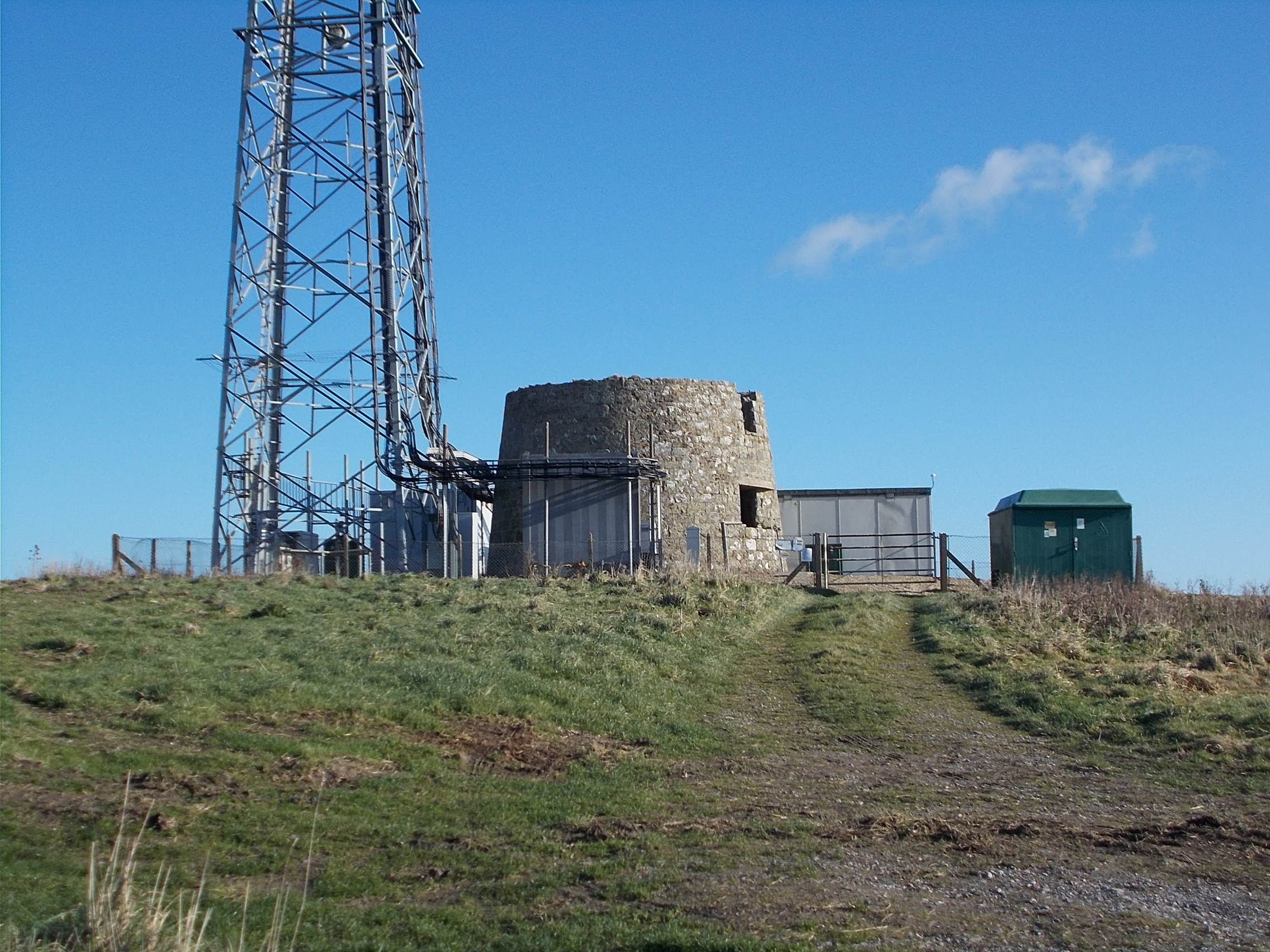
The "Salt Cellar", now within the compound of a modern wireless station.

Although de Godeton died in 1327, the lighthouse was nevertheless completed in 1328. It remained in active use until the Dissolution of the Monasteries between 1538 and 1541.

St. Catherine's Oratory is Britain's only surviving medieval lighthouse, and the second oldest, after the Roman lighthouse at Dover. It is a stone structure four stories high, octagonal on the outside and four-sided on the inside, originally attached to the west side of a building; remnants of three other walls are visible.

In the 18th century, Sir Richard Worsley of Appuldurcombe House bolstered the structure by adding four large buttresses to prevent its collapse.

Nearby, there are the footings of a replacement lighthouse begun in 1785 but never completed, as the hill was prone to dense fog. Its remnants are known locally as the "salt cellar". A nearby Bronze Age barrow was excavated in 1925. The current St. Catherine's Lighthouse, constructed after the 1837 wreck of the Clarendon, was built much closer to sea level on St. Catherine's Point.

== See also ==
- List of lighthouses in England
