= St Catherine's Lighthouse =

Lighthouse on the southernmost point of the Isle of Wight, England

St. Catherine's Lighthouse
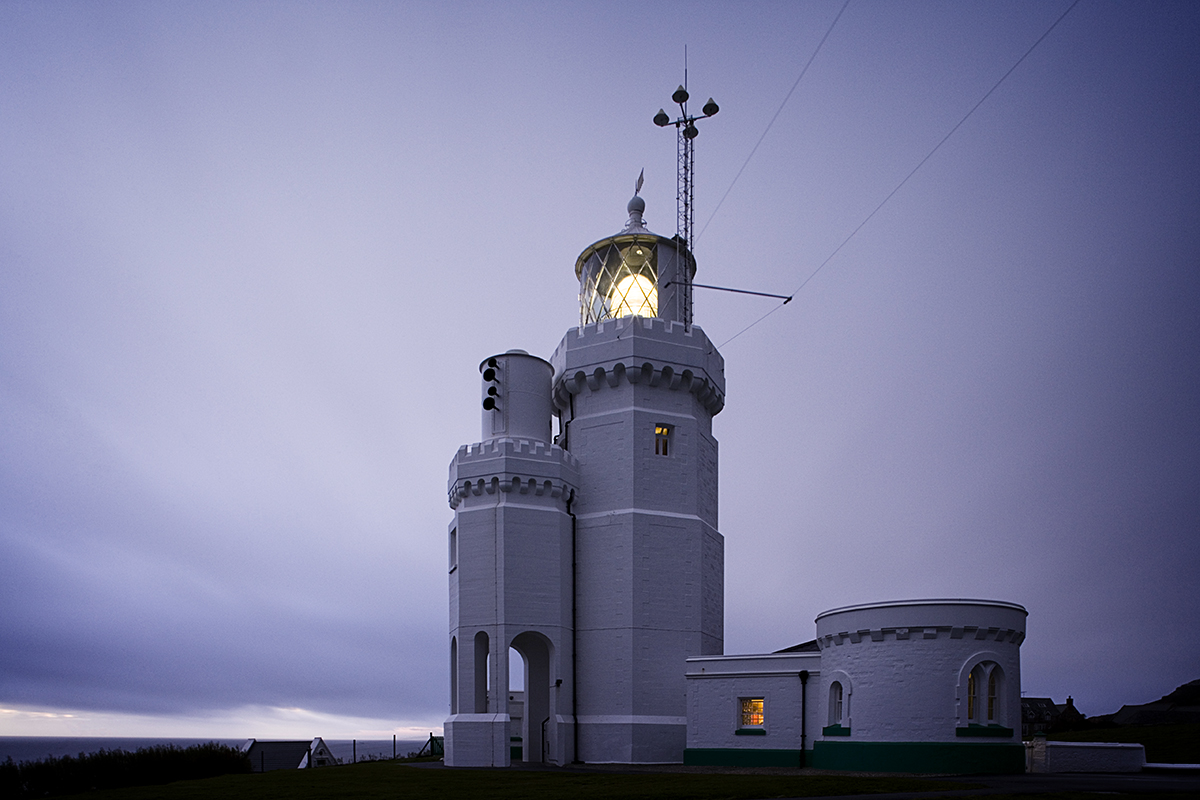
- The lighthouse, with fog-signal tower attached
- Location: St Catherine's Point; Isle of Wight; England
- OS grid: SZ4981275339
- Coordinates: 50°34′32.4″N 1°17′51.9″W

Tower
- Constructed: c. 1323 (first)
- Construction: ashlar
- Automated: 1997
- Height: 27 m (89 ft)
- Shape: octagonal tower
- Markings: white tower and lantern
- Operator: Trinity House
- Heritage: Grade II listed building

Light
- First lit: 1838 (current)
- Focal height: 41 m (135 ft)
- Light source: LED
- Intensity: 821,000 candela
- Range: 19 nmi (35 km; 22 mi)
- Characteristic: Fl W 5s.

St Catherine's Lighthouse is a lighthouse located at St Catherine's Point at the southern tip of the Isle of Wight. It is one of the oldest lighthouse locations in Great Britain.

== Origins ==
The first lighthouse was established on St Catherine's Down in 1323 on the orders of the Pope, after a ship ran aground nearby and its cargo was either lost or plundered. Once part of St Catherine's Oratory, its octagonal stone tower can still be seen today on the hill to the west of Niton. It is known locally as the "Pepperpot". Nearby there are the footings of a replacement lighthouse begun in 1785, but this was never completed because the hill is prone to dense fog. It is sometimes called the "salt pot".

== History ==
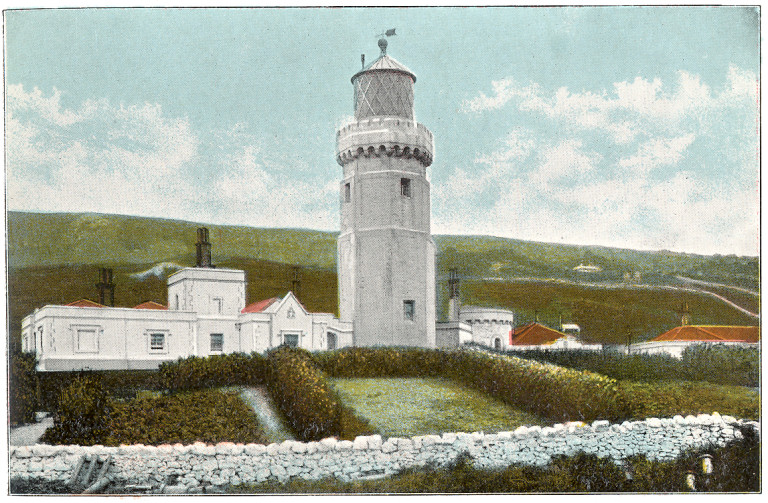
The lighthouse, viewed from the south, c.1910.

The new lighthouse, built by Trinity House in 1838, was constructed as a 40-metre (130 ft) stone tower. When first built the light was oil-fuelled; its lamp, with four concentric wicks, was set within a large (first-order) fixed dioptric lens, built by Cookson & co. and surmounted by 250 mirrors (which were later replaced with prisms). It was first lit on 1 March 1840; however, the light was often obscured by fog, which led in due course to the height of the tower being reduced by 13-metre (43 ft) in 1875. At the same time the lamp was replaced with a six-wick mineral-oil burner, and a system of 'dioptric mirrors' (prisms) was installed to redirect light from the landward side of the lamp out to sea.

In 1868 a Daboll trumpet fog signal was installed in a building on the cliff edge; it used an Ericsson 4 hp caloric engine to sound a reed attached to an acoustic horn, once every 20 seconds. In October 1876, the reed was changed to a more powerful siren which sounded two blasts every four minutes.

In the 1880s the decision was taken to convert the St Catherine's light to electric power. In 1888 a carbon arc lamp was installed, linked to a powerful set of De Méritens magneto-electric machines, powered by three Robey non-condensing compound steam engines. (St Catherine's was the last English lighthouse to be provided with an arc lamp). A new optic was also provided (a second-order 16-sided revolving dioptric lens array by Chance & co.) which showed a five-second flash every thirty seconds. At the time of its inauguration St Catherine's was claimed to be 'the most powerful electric light in the world'. The oil lamp was retained for use in emergencies, but in 1905 it was remarked that it had never had to be employed, as the electrical system had never failed in the seventeen years since its installation.

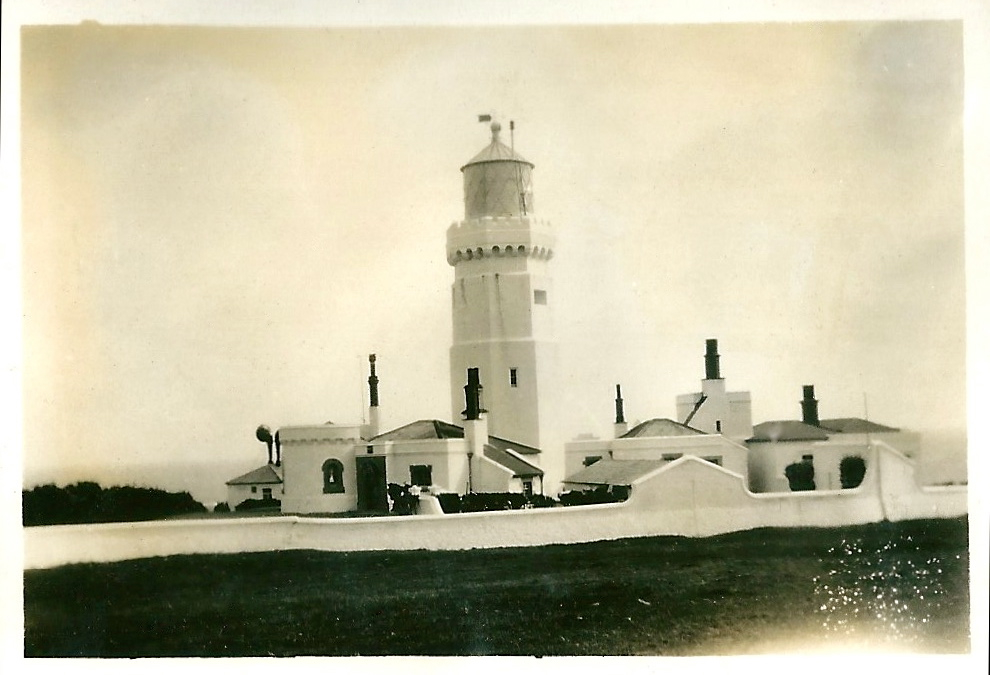
The lighthouse and associated buildings in the late-19th or early-20th century (viewed from the north); the fog signal house is on the far left.

As well as a new Engine House, more cottages were built, to accommodate the additional staff required to operate the generating plant. A new fog signal house was also built in 1888; in it a pair of double-noted 5-inch sirens were installed, sounding through a pair of upright horns, which emerged through the roof and were angled out to sea. Compressed air for the sirens was piped underground from the engine house, where the three engines were linked to an air compressor by way of a common drive shaft; compressed air was also used to power the mechanism that turned the lens. The sirens sounded two blasts every minute: a higher note followed by a low note.

From 1890 a narrow red sector was added to the light, to warn vessels from approaching too near to the shore west of St Catherine's Point. In addition to the flashing light showing red in this direction, a subsidiary apparatus redirected a fixed beam of light upwards from the rear of the main lens and reflected it to shine red in the same direction.

In 1901 a series of trials of different sirens and reeds attached to trumpets of different sizes and designs took place at St Catherine's (which had sufficient engine power to produce the required volume of compressed air). The tests were overseen by Lord Rayleigh, scientific adviser to Trinity House, whose distinctive and eponymous design of fog signal trumpet was installed at several different fog signal stations (though not at St Catherine's itself) in the wake of the trials.

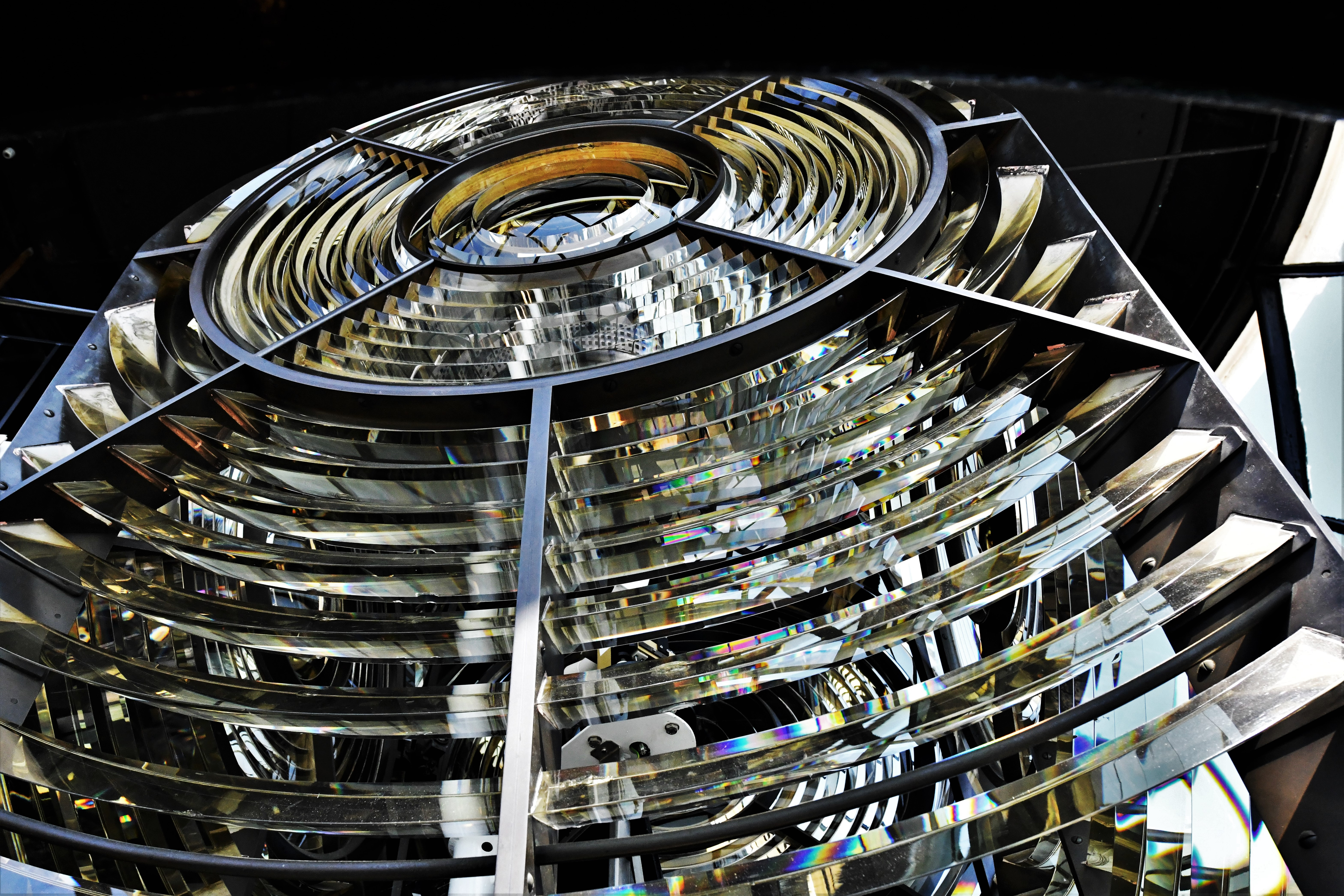
The 1904 optic in place in the lantern, in 2019.

In November 1904, the 16-sided optic was removed from St Catherine's (it was subsequently adapted for use in South Foreland Lighthouse). In its place, a new, more powerful set of lenses was installed: a four-sided second-order optic, designed by Thomas Matthews and manufactured by Chance Brothers. The new apparatus, borne on a trough of mercury and driven by a large clockwork mechanism, revolved much faster to give a much quicker flash, once every five seconds. It was said at the time to be 'the most powerful flash-light in [the] country', at 15,000,000 candlepower (compared to the 3,000,000 candlepower formerly produced by the old lens). The beam (albeit reflected on the clouds) could often be seen from Barfleur, 60 miles away. As part of the 1904 upgrade, the red sector light was reconfigured to shine from a window lower down in the tower, 20 ft (6.1 m) below the lantern; it continued to use light redirected from the landward side of the main lamp, by way of a series of lenses and prisms. The same arc lamps remained in use as formerly (one being kept on standby while the other was in operation), and in the engine room the Robey engines and De Méritens alternators were likewise retained.

The arc lamp was decommissioned in the 1920s; by this time it was the last operational arc lamp in a lighthouse in the UK (it is now displayed as an exhibit in Southsea Castle.) It was replaced by a 4 kW filament lamp powered by mains electricity; an automatic lamp changer was provided, to engage a standby electric lamp in the event of a bulb failure (and a standby acetylene lamp in the event of a power failure). The 1904 optic was retained, with the addition of an electric winder to the clockwork rotation drive.

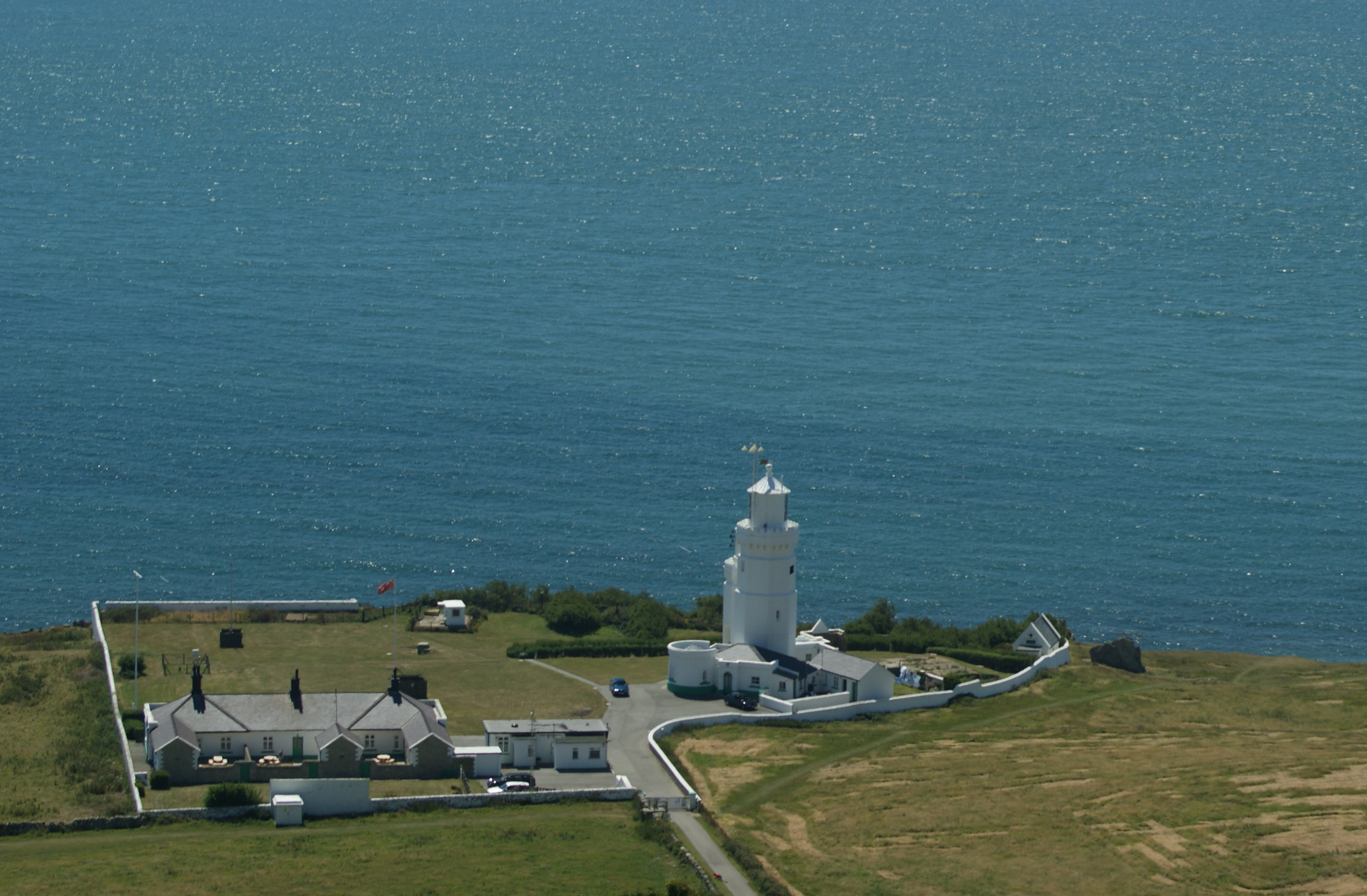
View of the lighthouse and nearby keepers' cottages, in 2008.

By 1932 the fog horn house was being undermined by erosion; it was demolished and a second (smaller) tower was then built alongside the lighthouse to house a new more powerful 12-inch siren. On 1 June 1943 a bombing raid destroyed the engine house, killing the three duty keepers. As part of the post-war repairs, a diaphone was installed in place of the siren. This was itself replaced by a 'supertyfon' air horn in 1962, when new engines and compressors were also installed; the fog signal was discontinued in 1987.

In the early 2000s a T-antenna was spun between the lighthouse and a mast for transmitting DGPS-signals on 307.5 kHz.

A team of volunteers used to provide tours of the lighthouse year round; however in January 2020 Trinity House announced that St Catherine's lighthouse would have to 'close its doors to the visiting public as a tourist attraction' claiming that it was no longer economically viable to keep the visitor centre open.

Up until 2021 the 1904 revolving optic remained in use; the lighthouse had a range of 25 nautical miles (46 km; 29 mi) and was the third-most powerful of all the lights maintained by Trinity House. In November 2020, however, the Isle of Wight Council granted Trinity House planning consent for "removal of existing lens, light pedestal, service stage railings and cleaning platform from lantern room; replacement platform, railings and stationary led light on pedestal".

== Present day ==
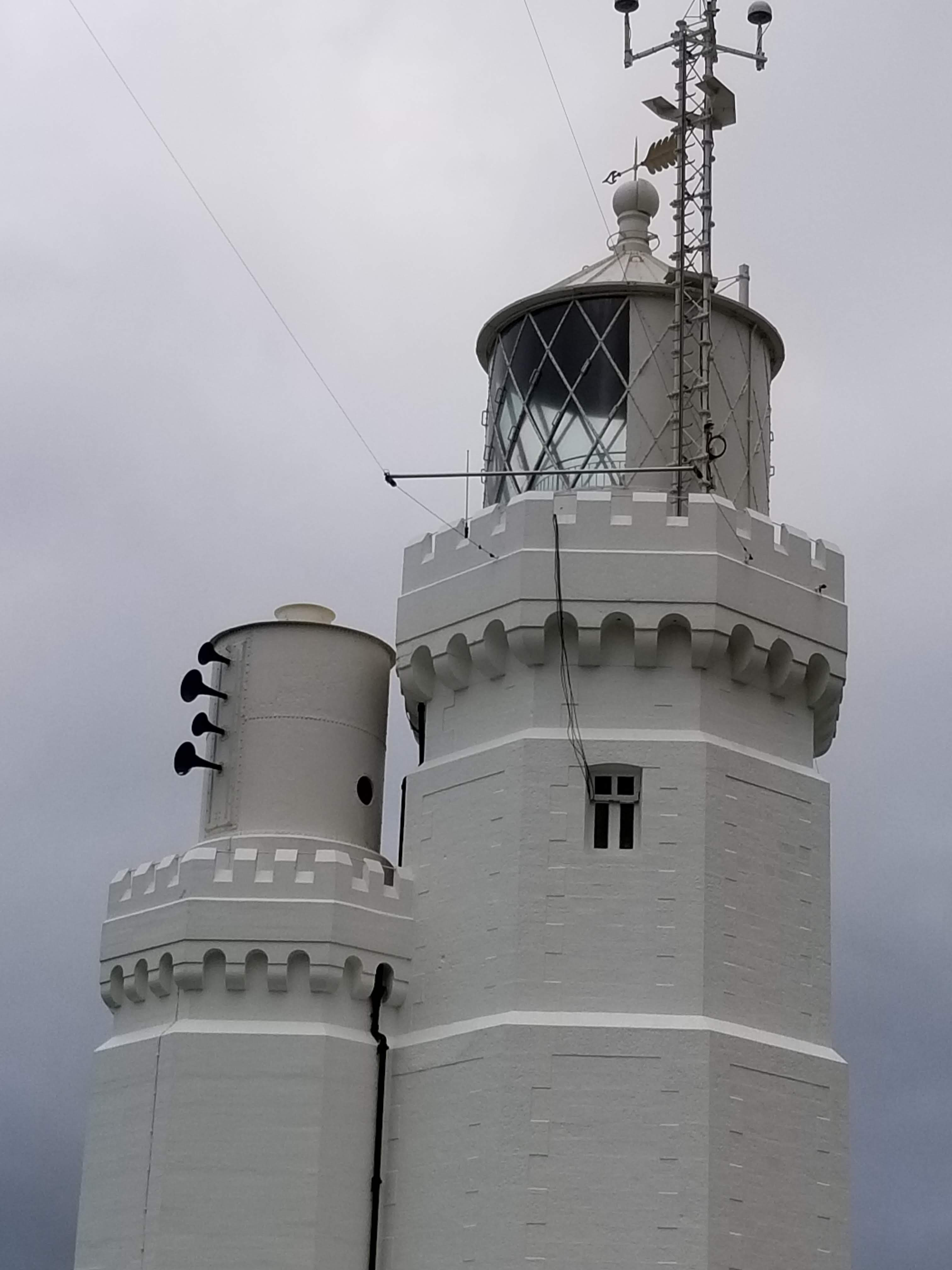
The lantern room after removal of the Fresnel lens, October 2021

In July 2021, Trinity House issued a Notice to Mariners reducing the light's nominal range from 25 nautical miles (46 km; 29 mi) to 19; later that year the second-order Fresnel lens system was removed (the light being shown for a time from a temporary lamp). It was replaced the following year with two Vega VLB92 type LED lanterns (one to function as the main light, the other as a standby).

A red sector light (range 13 nautical miles (24 km; 15 mi)), shown from a window lower in the tower, marks Atherfield Ledge. This light was also upgraded in 2021. At the same time the DGPS system formerly in operation at the lighthouse was decommissioned.

In 2023 the redundant 1904 optic was returned to the island and put on display at the Classic Boat Museum in Cowes.

Three former keepers' cottages around the lighthouse can be rented out as holiday accommodation.

== See also ==
- List of lighthouses in England
