= St. Catherine's Down =

Chalk down on the Isle of Wight, England

Coordinates: 50.59335°N 1.30486°W

St Catherine's Down
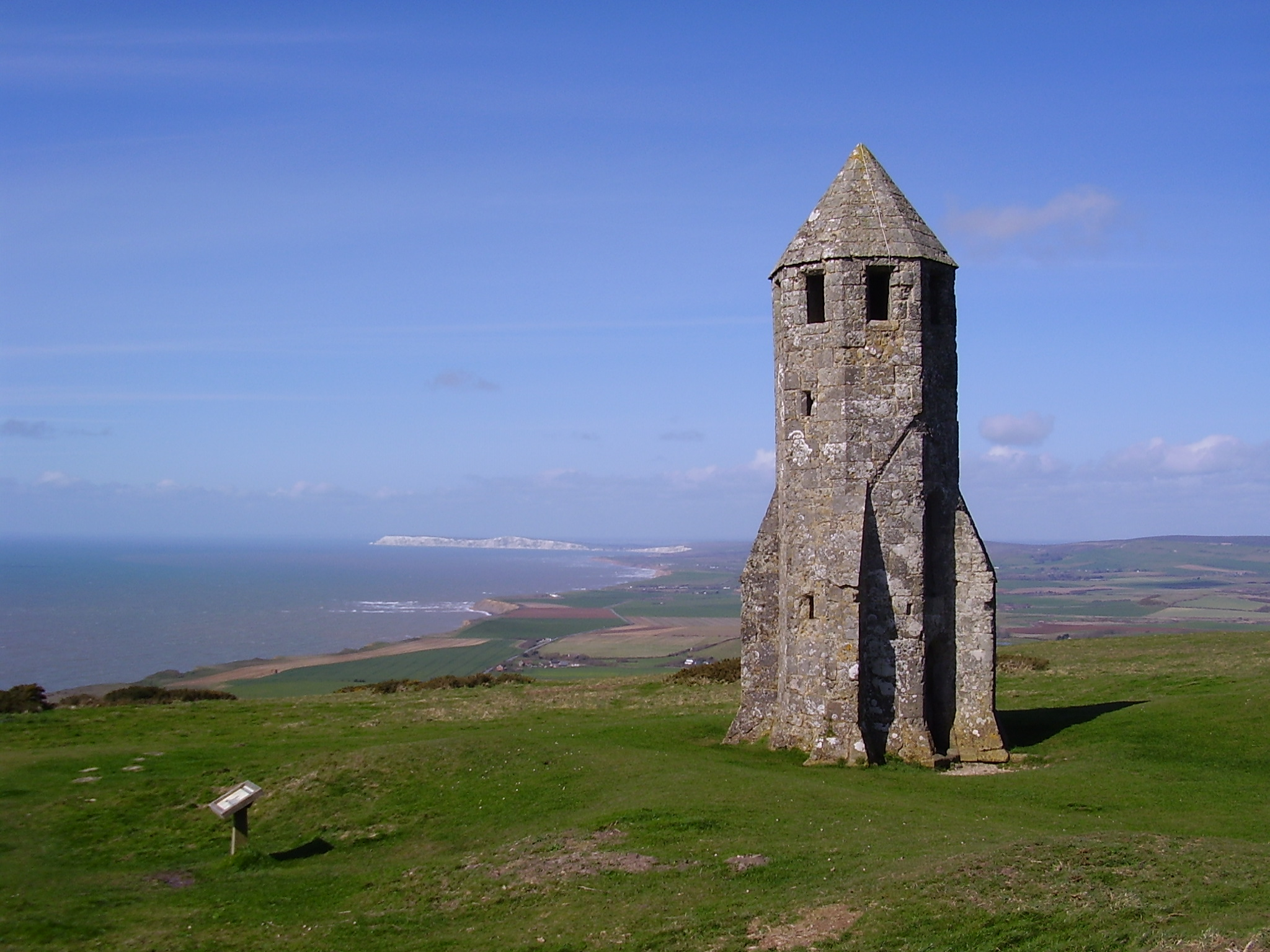
- The "Pepperpot" on St. Catherine's Hill

Highest point
- Elevation: 237 m (778 ft)
- Listing: (none)

Geography
- Location: Isle of Wight, England
- OS grid: SZ493773
- Topo map: OS Landranger 196

St. Catherine's Down is a chalk down on the Isle of Wight, located near St Catherine's Point, the southernmost point on the island. The Down rises to 240 metres at its highest point, between the towns of Niton and Chale. Upon the hill is St. Catherine's Oratory (known locally as "the pepperpot"), which is a stone lighthouse built in the 14th century by Walter De Godeton. It is the second oldest, and only surviving, medieval lighthouse in the British Islands: only the Roman lighthouse at Dover is older.

Reportedly, de Godeton was found guilty for having plundered wine that belonged to the Church from the shipwreck of the St. Marie of Bayonne in Chale Bay. He was ordered to make amends, under threat of excommunication, by building and maintaining the lighthouse. It was completed after his death, and staffed by a priest; fires were lit in the tower to warn ships of the coast. There was originally a chapel attached, which has since been demolished. A Bronze Age barrow near the Oratory was excavated in the 1920s.

A replacement lighthouse was begun in 1785 but was never completed because the Down is prone to dense fog. Locally, the surviving foundations are known as the "salt cellar". After the wreck of the Clarendon in 1837, a new lighthouse, St Catherine's Lighthouse, was built to the west of Niton at the foot of the Undercliff.

The River Medina, the main river of the Isle of Wight, rises at St Catherine's Down and flows northwards through the county town Newport, towards the Solent at Cowes.

== Hoy monument ==
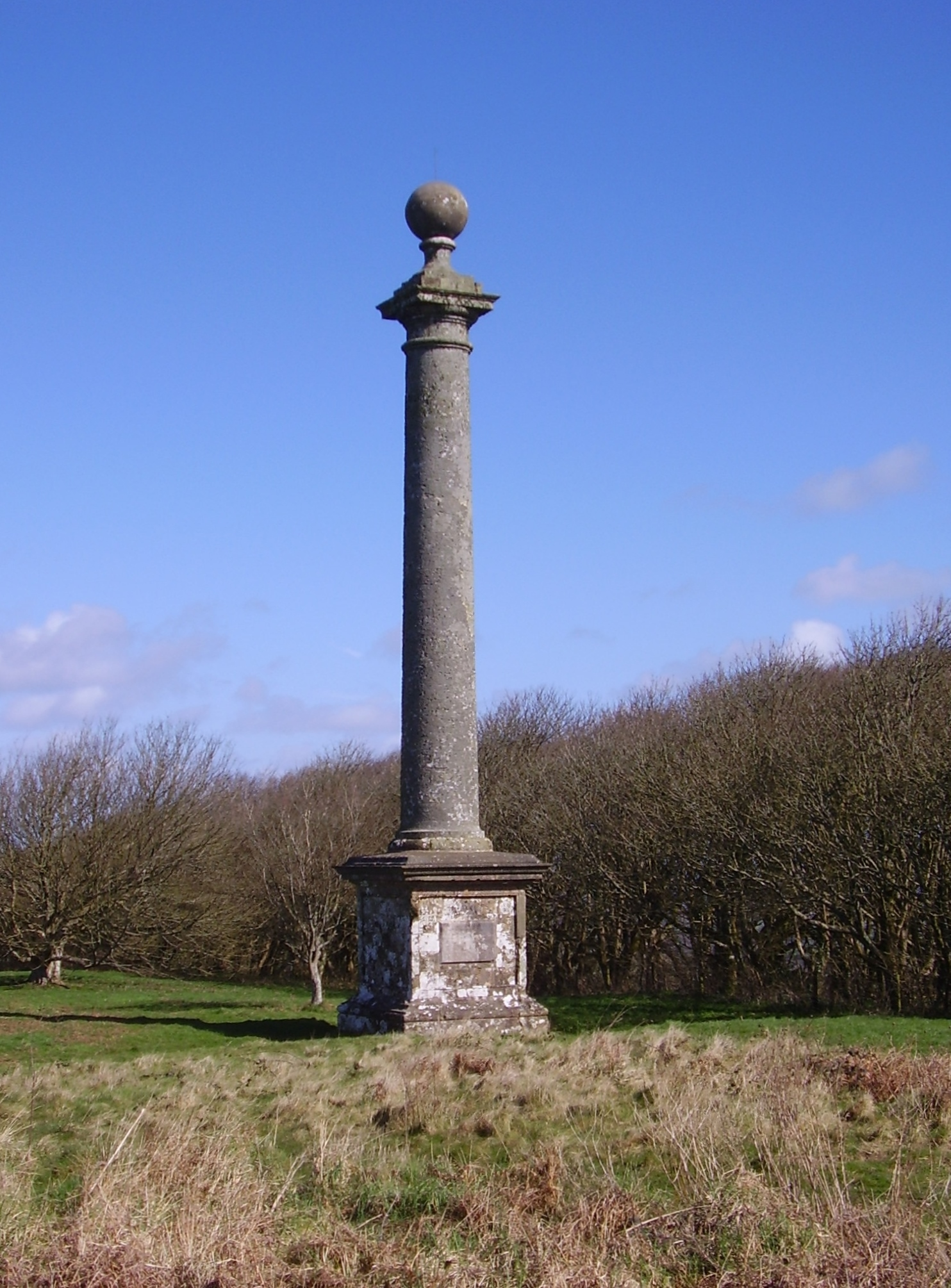
The Hoy Monument on St. Catherine's Down

The northern end of St. Catherine's Down carries the Hoy Monument. This was created in 1814 by Russian merchant Michael Hoy (1758–1828), whose wealth came from trade with Britain, to commemorate the visit of the Russian Tsar to Great Britain, hence its informal alternative name the "Russian Monument". After Hoy's death, an inscription was made at the base that commemorates soldiers killed in the Crimean War in 1857. The Hoy Monument was repaired in 1992 using an £85,000 donation.

== See also ==
- List of hills of the Isle of Wight
