= Hatherwood Battery =

- Alum Bay, Isle of Wight, England
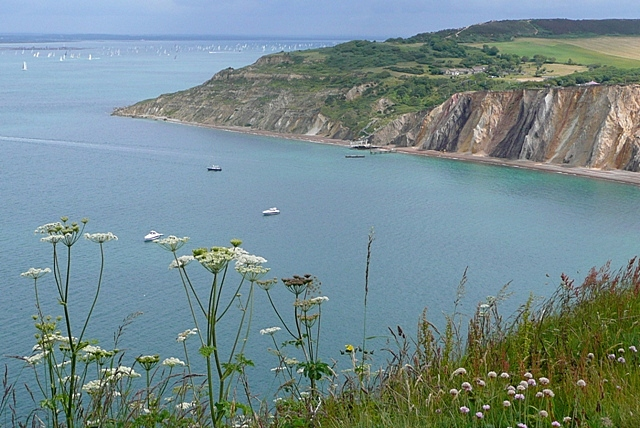
- Hatherwood Point and Alum Bay

Site information
- Open to the public: Yes
- Condition: ruin

Location
- Coordinates: 50°40′14″N 1°33′53″W

Site history
- Built: 1869
- In use: 1869–1903, 1940–1943
- Materials: Earth, Concrete
- Battles/wars: World War II

Hatherwood Battery (map reference SZ308857) is a battery located to the east of Alum Bay on the Isle of Wight. It is one of the many Palmerston Forts built on the island to protect it in response to a perceived French invasion. It was sited to cross fire with the nearby Needles Battery

Originally designed to mount six 68 Pounder guns, construction of the battery began in 1865. Before it was completed it was decided to mount seven guns in three groups. This comprised two 9-inch Rifled Muzzle Loading (RML) guns on each flank and three 7-inch Rifled Breech Loading (RBL) guns in the centre. The battery was complete by 1869. There was no accommodation at the battery for the soldiers who would man it. Instead these men were billetted at nearby Golden Hill Fort. In 1903 the battery was officially disarmed.

Today not much is left of the battery as it has been left to decay, with some parts falling off the cliff due to erosion.

== Publications ==
- Cantwell, Anthony (1986). The Needles Defences. Isle of Wight: Solent Papers. ISBN 1870113012.
- Hogg, Ian V (1974). Coast Defences of England and Wales 1856-1956. David & Charles. ISBN 0-7153 6353-0.
