= St Catherine's Point =

Southernmost point on the Isle of Wight, England

Coordinates: 50°34′30″N 1°17′44″W

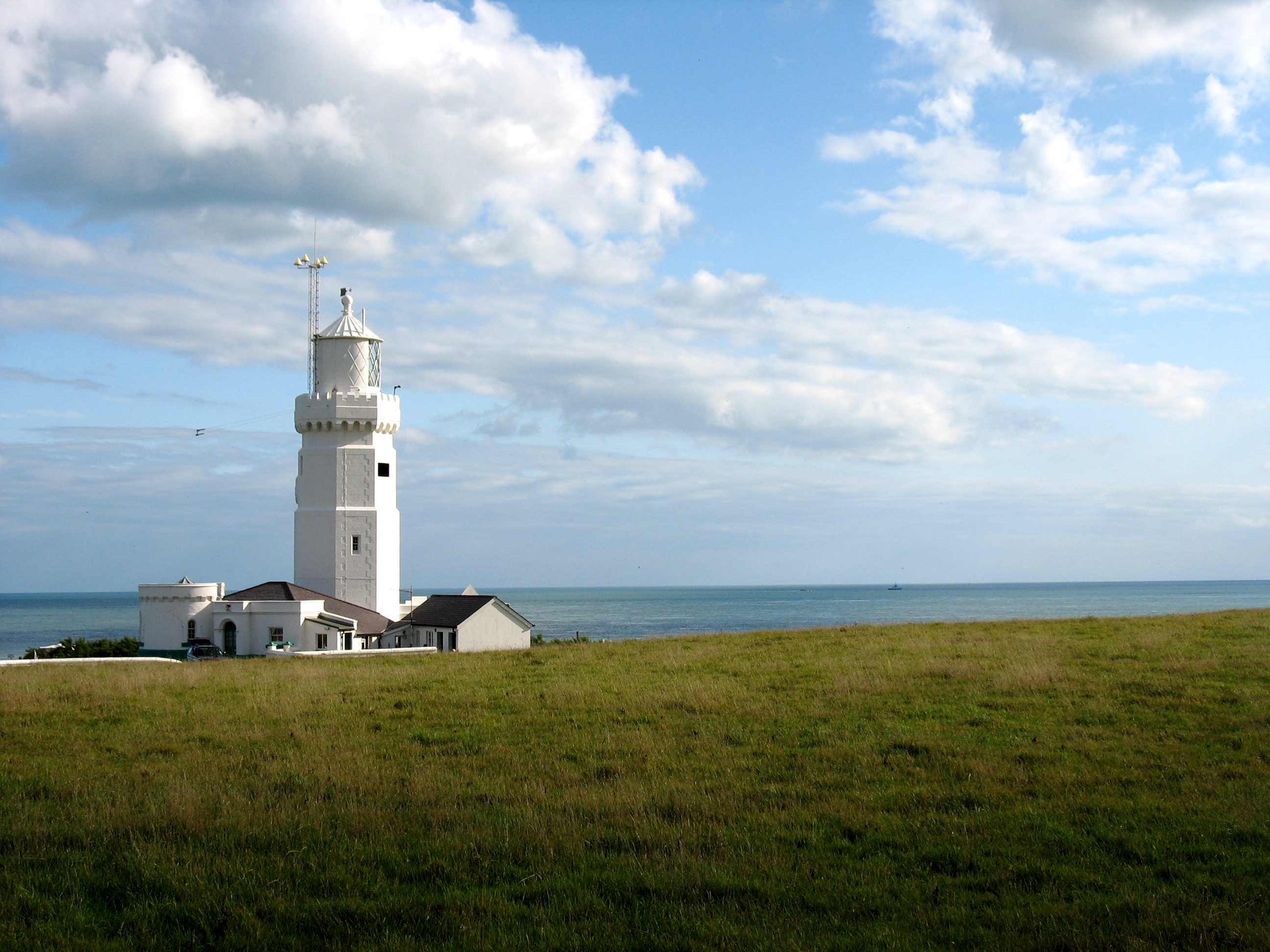
St Catherine's Lighthouse at St Catherine's Point

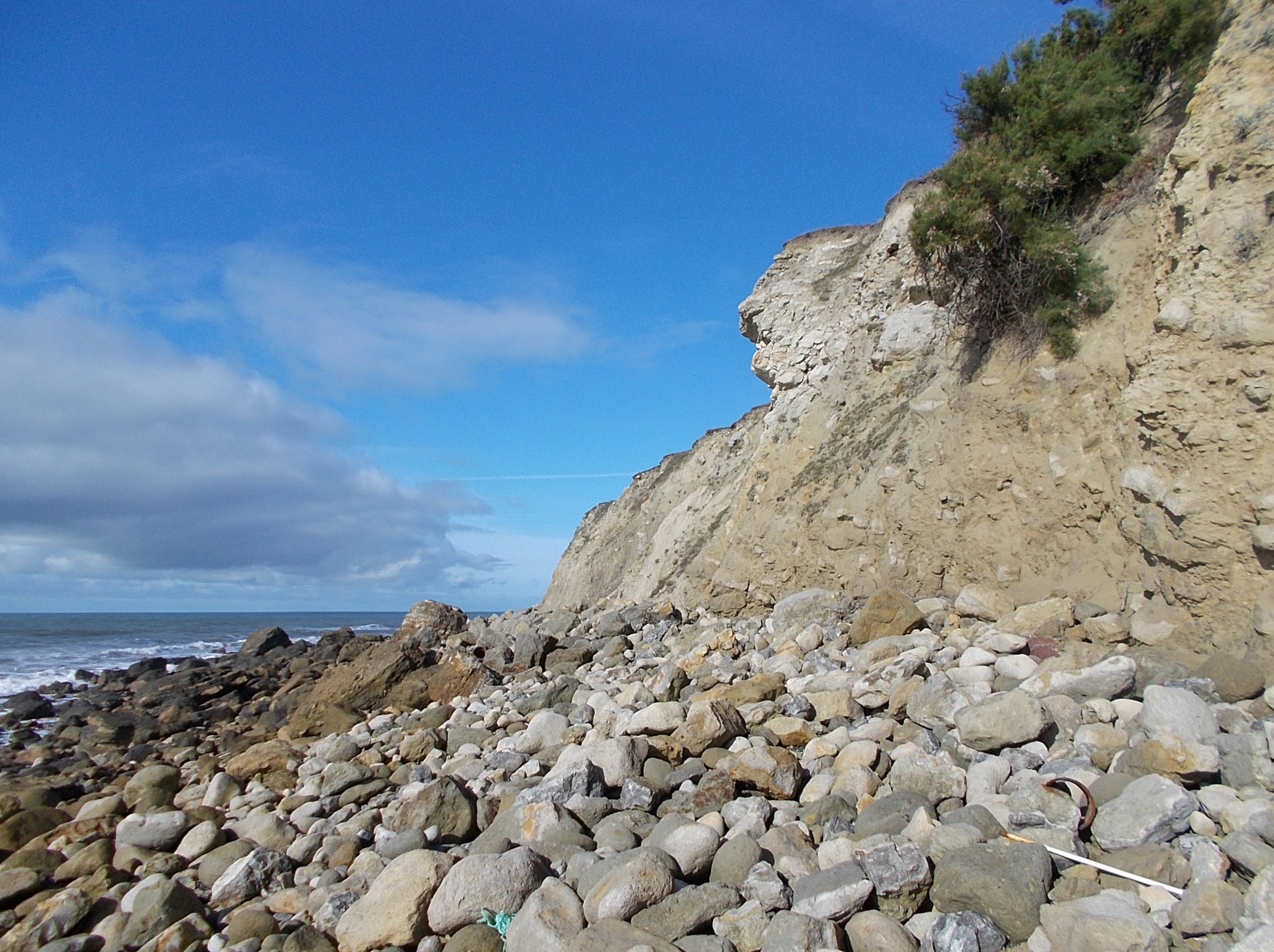
The beach directly below the lighthouse. Erosion threatens the southern wall of the lighthouse compound (2017).

St Catherine's Point is the southernmost point on the Isle of Wight. It is close to the village of Niton and the point where the Back of the Wight changes to the Undercliff of Ventnor.

== Geography ==
There was an attached chapel at one time, but it has been long demolished. There is a Bronze Age barrow nearby which was excavated in the 1920s.

St Catherine's Point is often foggy, so it is not the best location for a lighthouse, but as a weather station the location is fairly suitable. The weather station is one of the 22 locations whose reports are included in the BBC Shipping Forecast.

== History ==
Reportedly, de Godeton felt guilty for having scavenged wine, destined for a monastery from the wreck of the St Marie of Bayonne in Chale Bay. He was ordered, on pain of excommunication, to make amends by building this lighthouse. Fires were lit in the lighthouse tower to warn ships at sea of the presence of the coast.

On nearby St Catherine's Down is St Catherine's Oratory, locally known as the "Pepperpot", a stone lighthouse built in the 1323 by Walter De Godeton. It is Britain's oldest medieval lighthouse.

A replacement lighthouse was begun in 1785. However it was never completed. Locally this half-finished building is known as the "salt pot".

LB&SCR H1 class 4-4-2 no. 40 (later no. B40 and 2040) was named St. Catherine's Point after this landmark.

=== Radio history ===
The first effective demonstration of radio, from a boat off Sandbanks in Dorset, to here, occurred. It was known as Niton Wireless Station, next to the lighthouse.

On 23 January 1901, the first over-the-horizon radio transmission took place to the Lizard Wireless Station at Bass Point (England) in Cornwall.

== Climate ==
Climate data for St Catherines Point (1991–2020 normals, extremes 1924-present)
Month	Jan	Feb	Mar	Apr	May	Jun	Jul	Aug	Sep	Oct	Nov	Dec	Year
Record high °C (°F)	14.4 (57.9)	15.0 (59.0)	20.5 (68.9)	23.0 (73.4)	28.9 (84.0)	30.3 (86.5)	29.9 (85.8)	32.2 (90.0)	28.9 (84.0)	24.3 (75.7)	17.5 (63.5)	15.0 (59.0)	32.2 (90.0)
Mean daily maximum °C (°F)	8.5 (47.3)	8.3 (46.9)	9.8 (49.6)	12.1 (53.8)	14.9 (58.8)	17.3 (63.1)	19.4 (66.9)	19.9 (67.8)	18.4 (65.1)	15.4 (59.7)	12.1 (53.8)	9.5 (49.1)	13.8 (56.8)
Daily mean °C (°F)	6.7 (44.1)	6.3 (43.3)	7.6 (45.7)	9.5 (49.1)	12.3 (54.1)	14.9 (58.8)	17.0 (62.6)	17.5 (63.5)	16.0 (60.8)	13.3 (55.9)	10.0 (50.0)	7.5 (45.5)	11.6 (52.9)
Mean daily minimum °C (°F)	4.8 (40.6)	4.3 (39.7)	5.4 (41.7)	7.0 (44.6)	9.7 (49.5)	12.4 (54.3)	14.6 (58.3)	15.1 (59.2)	13.5 (56.3)	11.1 (52.0)	8.0 (46.4)	5.6 (42.1)	9.3 (48.7)
Record low °C (°F)	−9.5 (14.9)	−8.0 (17.6)	−6.1 (21.0)	−2.2 (28.0)	−0.6 (30.9)	1.1 (34.0)	4.4 (39.9)	6.6 (43.9)	0.6 (33.1)	−1.7 (28.9)	−4.4 (24.1)	−6.1 (21.0)	−9.5 (14.9)
Average precipitation mm (inches)	76.4 (3.01)	56.3 (2.22)	47.1 (1.85)	46.7 (1.84)	44.8 (1.76)	42.5 (1.67)	40.6 (1.60)	50.8 (2.00)	57.0 (2.24)	87.5 (3.44)	87.8 (3.46)	88.1 (3.47)	725.6 (28.57)
Average precipitation days (≥ 1.0 mm)	12.5	10.2	9.0	8.5	7.5	7.0	6.6	7.8	7.9	11.8	13.5	13.2	115.5
Source 1: Met Office
Source 2: Starlings Roost Weather

== See also ==
- Egypt Point
