= Golden Hill Fort =

- Golden Hill, Isle of Wight, England
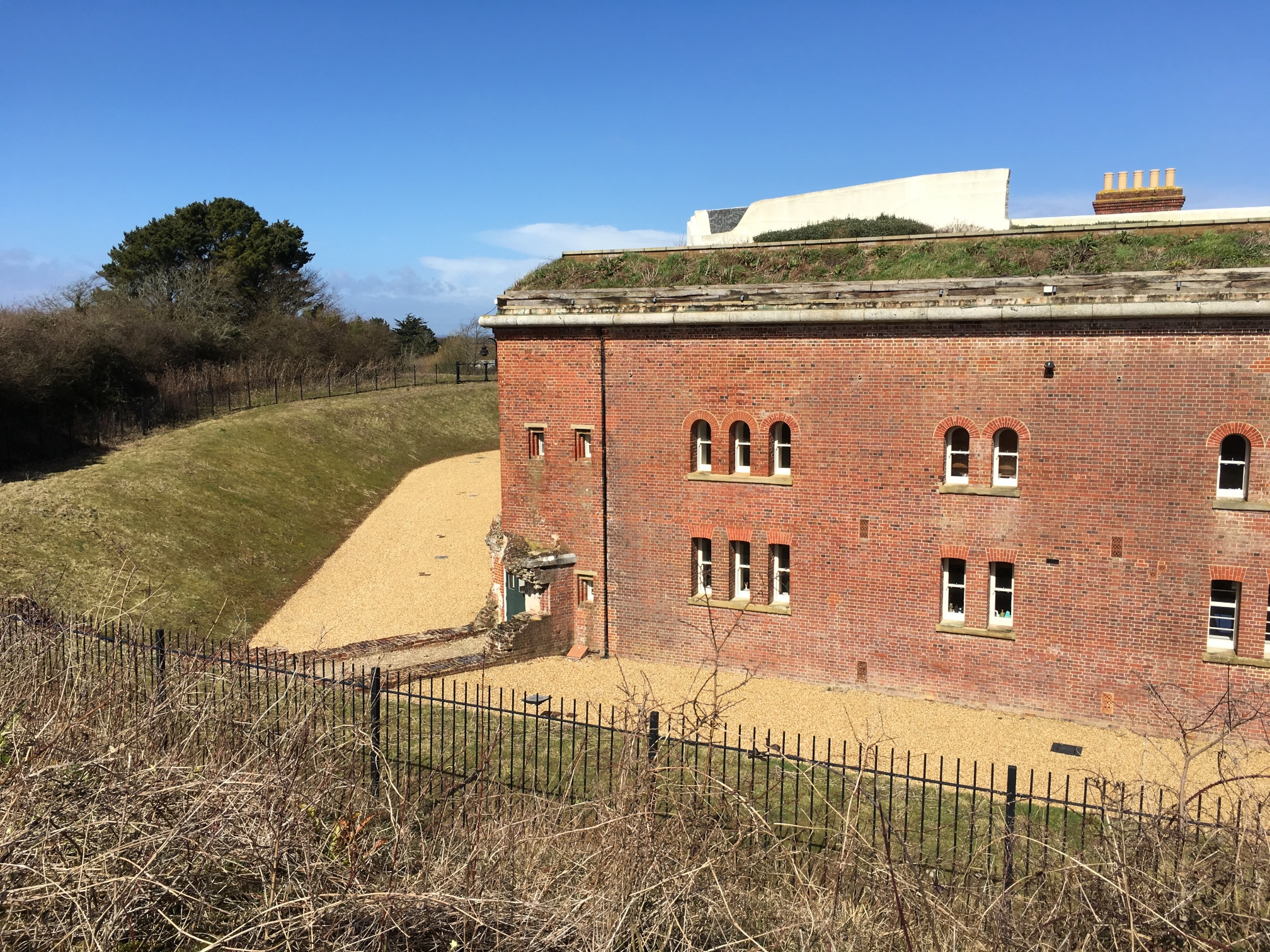
- Golden Hill Fort after conversion to residential in 2016

Site information
- Owner: Hunter Estates
- Open to the public: No

Location
- Coordinates: 50°41′22″N 1°31′18″W

Site history
- Built: 1863-1872
- In use: 1872 onwards
- Materials: Brick

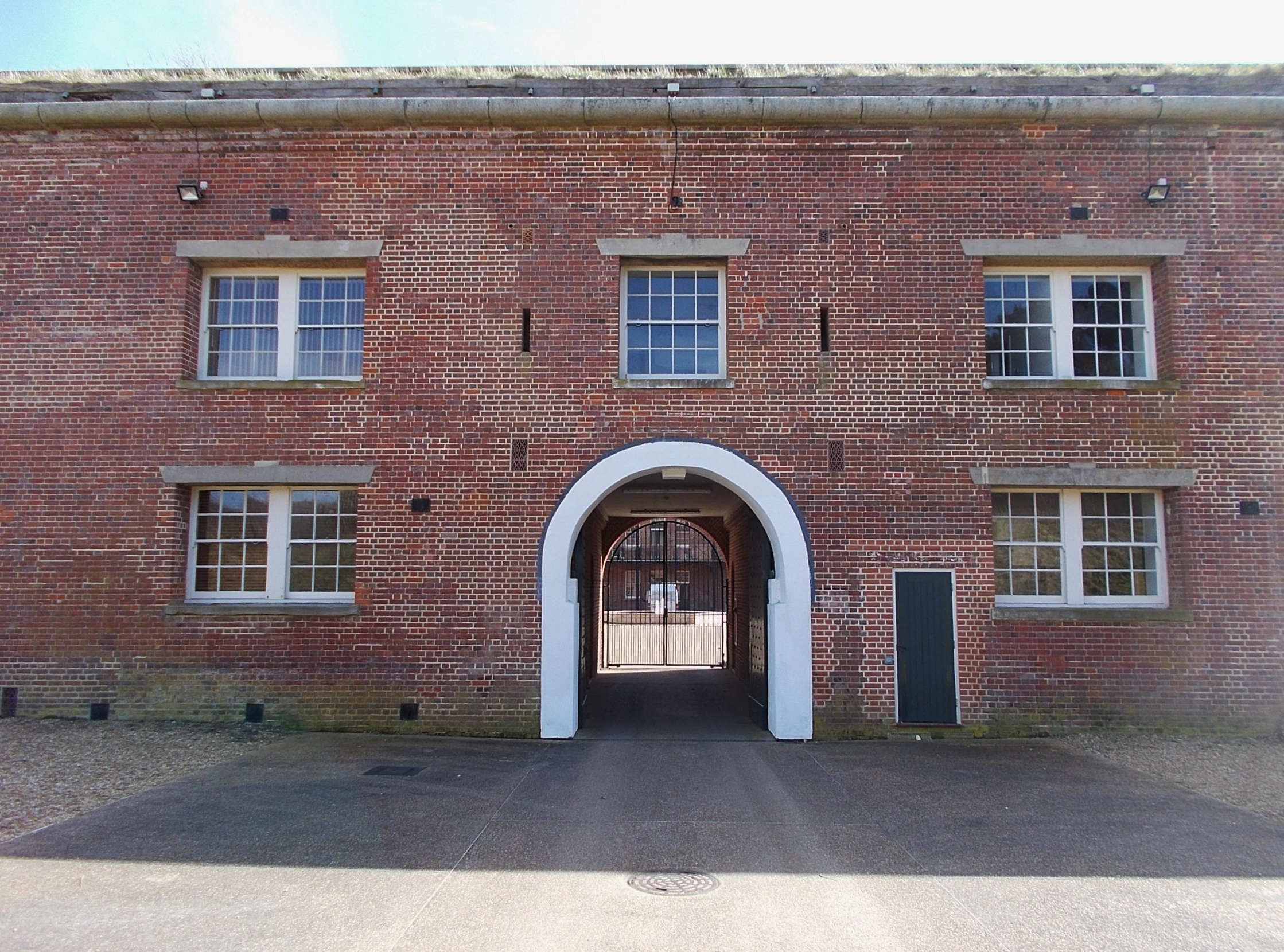
Entrance to the fort

Golden Hill Fort was a defensible barracks at Freshwater, Isle of Wight, England, built as part of the Palmerston defences by the 1859 Royal Commission on the Defence of the United Kingdom to provide manpower to man the defences at the western end of the Isle of Wight, England. Built in hexagonal form, it accommodated 8 officers and 128 men, and had its own hospital.

The garrison for the nearby Hatherwood Battery was held at the fort. In 1914 33 Company Royal Garrison Artillery was based at the Fort.

The Fort is a local landmark which is in a very prominent position overlooking much of the land looking south towards Afton Down. Whilst operational, the area was kept clear of vegetation to allow views out to the Solent. The name Golden Hill refers not to the spectacular golden display of flowering European gorse, but to an historic landowner named Gauden.

The building, which is a Grade I listed building, is now in private ownership and not open to the public. It was derelict and had not been used for many years, passing through numerous owners. Planning consent was granted in 2003 for conversion to residential use, with the listed building consent updated in 2007. Golden Hill Fort was converted into 18 dwellings by Golden Hill Homes between 2008 and 2011.

== Golden Hill Country Park ==
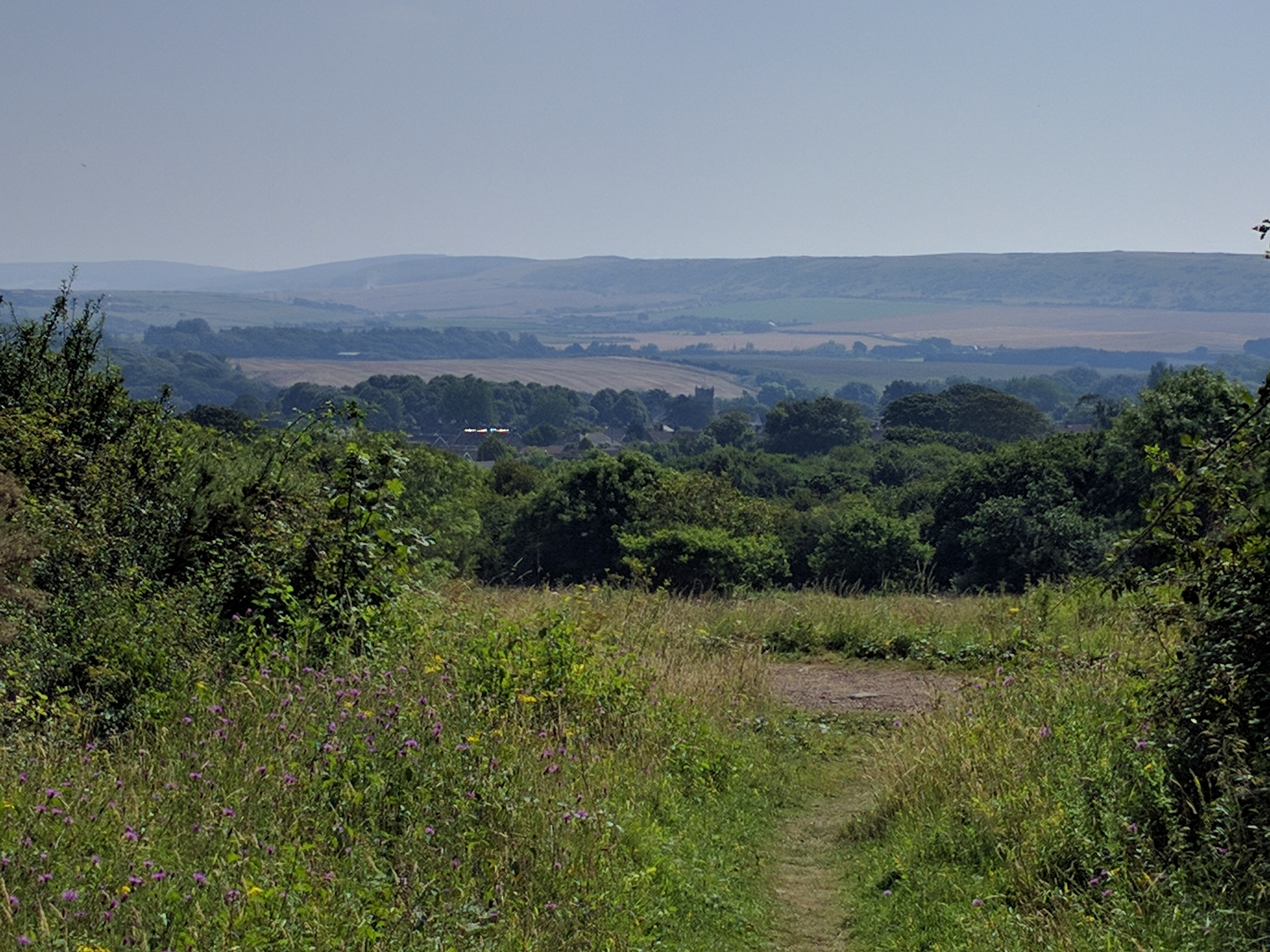
View south-east from Golden Hill Country Park

The surrounding land is open to the public as a country park. The site is owned by the Isle of Wight Council and managed by Gift to Nature. It is an open grassland with areas of scrubby secondary woodland, featuring long views across Afton Down and Freshwater Bay, bridleways, viewpoints and a small car park.

The soil types on which it stands are complex and support a wide range of plants, including the chalk-loving yellow-wort and dwarf thistle; and dyer's greenweed, a feature of neutral soils and gorse which is associated with more acid soils. These attract a good range of butterflies. The habitats vary and there is a transition between open grassland, scrub and woodland.

== Publications ==
- Cantwell, Anthony (1986). The Needles Defences. Isle of Wight: Solent Papers. ISBN 1870113012.
