= Brighstone Down =

Chalk hill on the Isle of Wight, England

Coordinates: 50.66038°N 1.39018°W

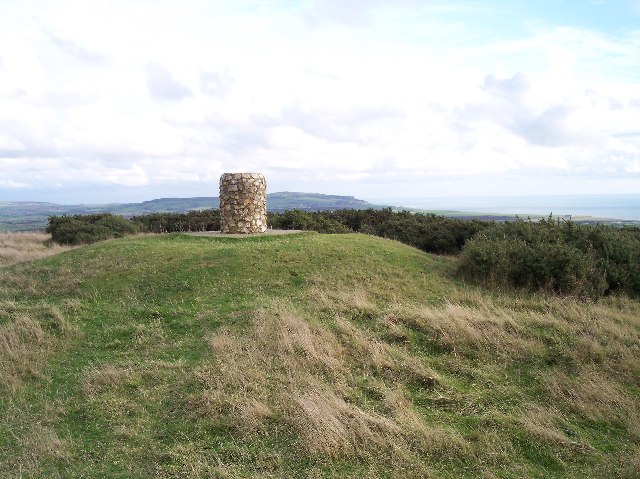
- Toposcope on the summit

Highest point
- Elevation: 214 m (702 ft)
- Prominence: c. 150 m
- Parent peak: St Boniface Down
- Listing: Marilyn

Geography
- Location: Isle of Wight, England
- OS grid: SZ432847
- Topo map: OS Landranger 196

Brighstone Down is a chalk down on the Isle of Wight. It is located close to the village of Brighstone, in the southwest of the island (the Back of the Wight), and rises to 214 metres (702 ft) at its highest point, northeast of the village of Mottistone. Towards the west part is called Mottistone Down, to the East, Shorwell Down.

The Northern part is covered by Brighstone Forest the largest forest on the Island.

On 19 November 1947, an BOAC Short S.25 Sunderland 3 (G-AGHW) was on a ferry flight from Hythe Seaplane Base to Poole Seaplane Base. The aircraft crashed into Brighstone Down in bad weather, as a result of pilot error, killing one of the four crew.
