= Luccombe Manor =

Luccombe Manor (also Lovecombe, 11th century) was a manor house on the Isle of Wight, situated in the parish of Bonchurch.

== History ==
Luccombe was held of the Confessor by Sawin as an alod, and at Domesday was in the hands of the king. It formed part of the original endowment of Quarr Abbey, having been given to the abbey by Hugh de Mandeville. At the beginning of the 13th century Walter de Insula (Lisle), with the consent of his son Geoffrey, endowed Quarr with the cultivated ground on the side of St. Boniface Down next Luccombe. Luccombe continued to belong to the monastery till the Dissolution, when it passed to the Crown. It was granted in 1553 to Thomas Reve and George Cotton, who sold it two days later without licence to William Colnett. In 1557–8 William obtained licence to retain the manor, of which he died seised in July 1594, leaving as his heir his son Barnabas, who in 1602 disposed of it to Michael Knight of Landguard, who died seised of it in 1612. It remained in the Knight family till 1753, when Anne Knight, spinster, disposed of it to William Pike, who devised it to —Bonham. In 1782–3, it was in the possession of members of the families of Bonham, Carter and Atherley, and in 1791 Edward Carter and his wife Harriet were dealing with it. At the beginning of the 19th century it had come to the Atherley family; in 1891 it was sold by Mr. Arthur Atherley to the Slater Ball Syndicate, and is now split up into various ownerships.
