= Old St Boniface Church, Bonchurch =

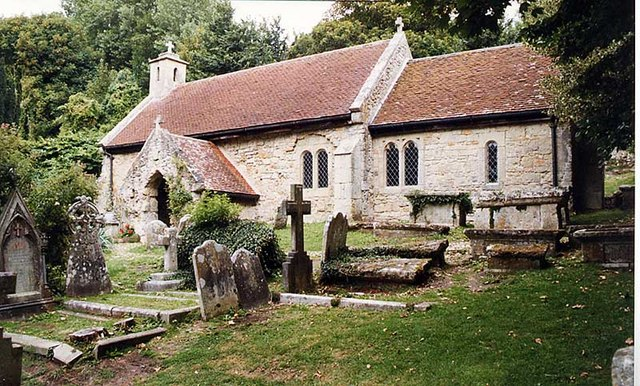
- Old St Boniface Church, Bonchurch
- 50°35′57″N 01°11′06″W
- Denomination: Church of England
- Churchmanship: Broad Church

History
- Dedication: St Boniface

Administration
- Province: Canterbury
- Diocese: Portsmouth
- Parish: Bonchurch

Old St Boniface Church, Bonchurch is a parish church in the Church of England located in Bonchurch, Isle of Wight.

== History ==
The nave and chancel dates from the 11th century, with the bell cote dating from the 16th century as does the bell. The south porch was added in the 19th century. It was replaced by St Boniface Church, Bonchurch in 1848 but despite contemporary discussions about demolition, survives. After the Parish church was built the old church now hosts Evening candlelit services in the summer months only, a Christmas Carol service and Holy Eucharist on the Feast day of the Patron Saint, St Boniface, on 5 June.

== Parish status ==
The church is within a group which includes:

- Old St Boniface Church, Bonchurch
- St Boniface Church, Bonchurch
- Holy Trinity Church, Ventnor
- St Catherine's Church, Ventnor

== Models ==
This church is the original for British scale model manufacturer Dapol's 00 scale railroad scenery model church construction kit.

== Gallery ==
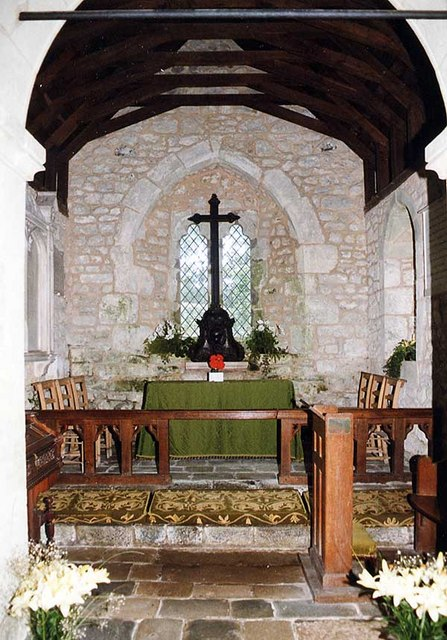

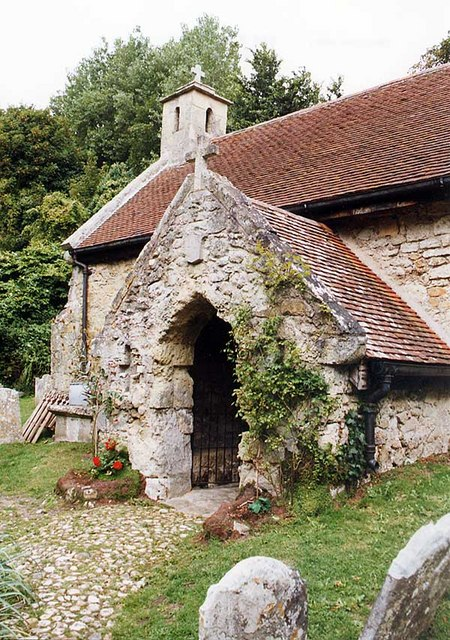
