= St Boniface Church, Bonchurch =

Coordinates: 50°36′00″N 01°11′13″W

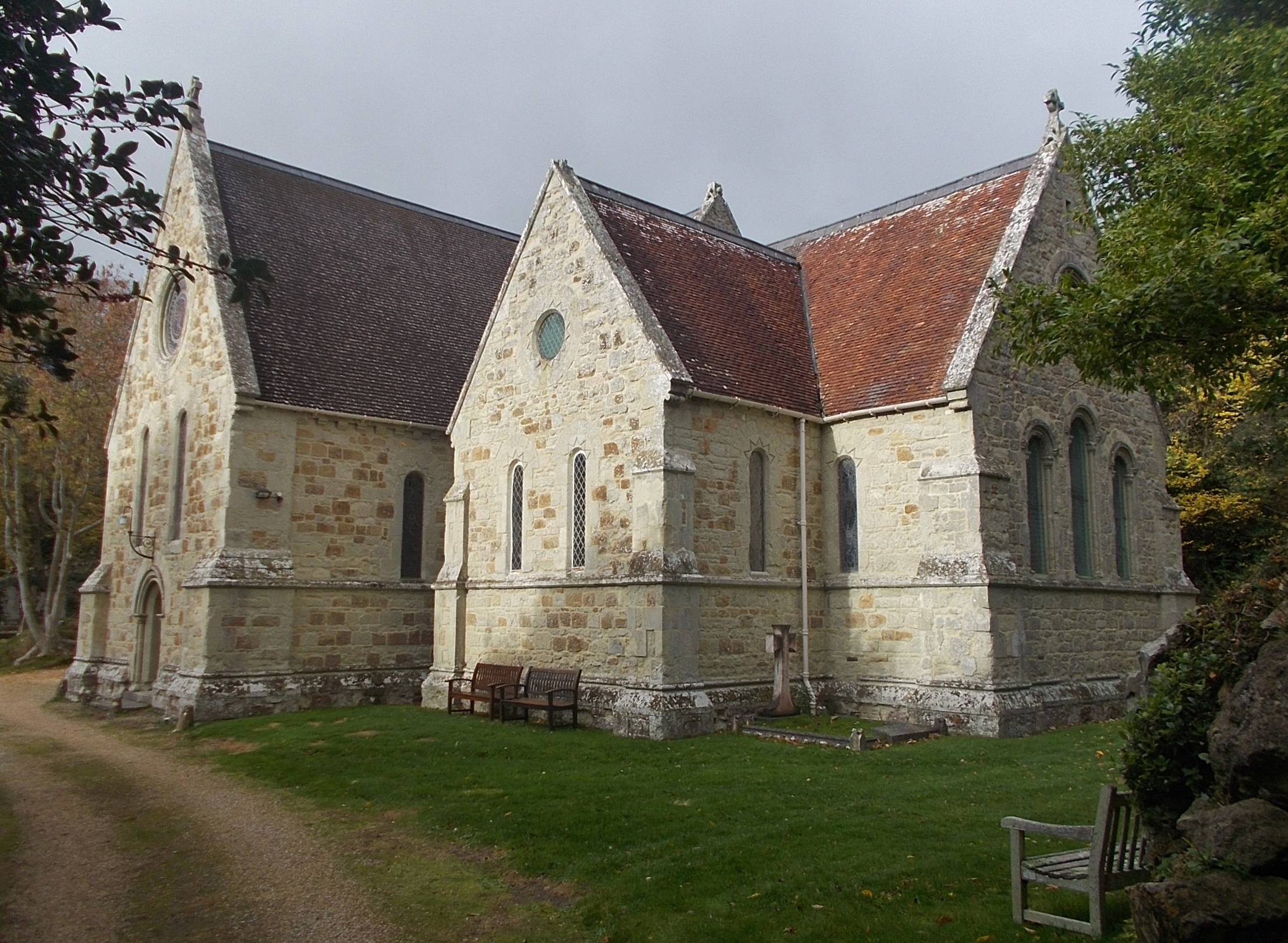
- St Boniface Church, Bonchurch
- Denomination: Church of England
- Churchmanship: Liturgical

History
- Dedication: St Boniface

Administration
- Province: Canterbury
- Diocese: Portsmouth
- Parish: Bonchurch

Clergy
- Rector: Interregnum

St Boniface Church, Bonchurch is a parish church in the Church of England located in Bonchurch, Isle of Wight.

== History ==
The church dates from 1847 and 1848 by the architect Ferrey. It was built to replace Old St Boniface Church, Bonchurch, to accommodate growing population. The church is cruciform in shape with a south porch and two north vestries and an organ chamber. The bell turret contains a single bell which weighs 4cwt and is tuned to the key of Eb. Much of the funds for building the Church were paid for by Captain Swinburne, father of Algernon Swinburne, the poet. The highly formidable Tractarian family, the Sewells, were deeply involved in the formation of this Church.

On the screen dividing the Rector's Stall from the nave is a memorial to Lord Admiral Earl Jellicoe of the Battle of Jutland, who worshipped here.

Triptych East Windows are an early work by William Wailes and depicts various scenes of Christ's life on earth. The roundel window crowning the triptych depicts The Angels appearing to the Shepherds announcing Christ's birth. The windows around the church feature many saints including the East Anglian saints, St Benedict Biscop, tutor to the Venerable Bede, and St Edith of Wilton. Much of the stained glass is by Henry Holiday and Shrigley and Hunt.

== Parish status ==
The church is within a group which includes:

- Old St Boniface Church, Bonchurch
- St Boniface Church, Bonchurch
- Holy Trinity Church, Ventnor
- St Catherine's Church, Ventnor

== Burials ==
- Algernon Charles Swinburne 1909. Poet
- Henry De Vere Stacpoole 1951. Author

The Reverend James White and family, devoted friends of Alfred Lord Tennyson who used to visit them in this parish.

Also Commonwealth War Graves, listed.

== Organ ==
The church has a pipe organ by Forster and Andrews dating from 1872. It is a two manual tracker organ and pneumatic pedal board. The beautiful organ casing painted with Fleur-de-lis and Tudor Roses was brought forward on a canopy above the console in the 1930s by Herbert Morris which hold the Great Open Diapason pipes. The organ has 21 stops and is Grade II listed. It was restored in 1995 in memory of a former parishioner.

The first organist of the Church was Miss Elizabeth Sewell whose brother William was the founder of Radley College, near Oxford. Miss Gwladys Williams LRAM FRCO was Organist and Choir mistress from 1921 to 1978. Mr. Ian D. Snow MBE LRAM FRCA LTCL was organist and Choirmaster from 1978 until 2006. The Church has a strong musical tradition and is affiliated to the RSCM.
