= Bonchurch =

Village on the Isle of Wight, England

Coordinates: 50.599545°N 1.181629°W

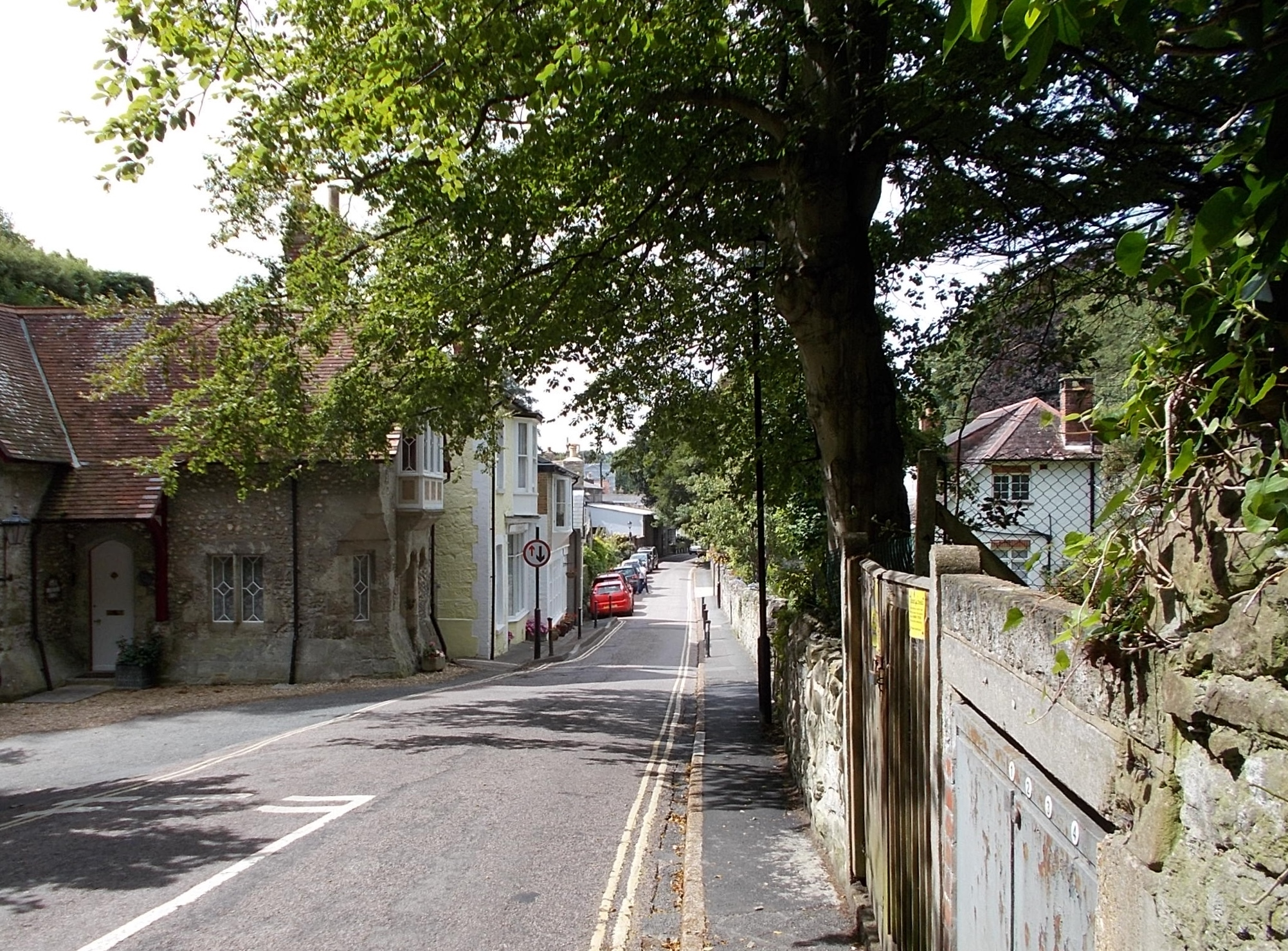

- Location within the Isle of Wight
- Civil parish: Ventnor
- Unitary authority: Isle of Wight
- Ceremonial county: Isle of Wight
- Region: South East
- Country: England
- Sovereign state: United Kingdom
- Post town: VENTNOR
- Postcode district: PO38
- Dialling code: 01983
- Police: Hampshire and Isle of Wight
- Fire: Hampshire and Isle of Wight
- Ambulance: Isle of Wight
- UK Parliament: Isle of Wight East

Bonchurch is a small village in the civil parish of Ventnor, to the east of the town of Ventnor, now largely connected to the latter by suburban development, on the southern part of the Isle of Wight, England. One of the oldest settlements on the Isle of Wight, it is situated on The Undercliff adjacent to the Bonchurch Landslips (or "The Landslip") Site of Special Scientific Interest. The main village is backed by a cliff to the north, with the Upper Bonchurch section on the clifftop halfway up St Boniface Down on the main A3055 road.

== Name ==
The name probably means 'the church of Bona', from Old English Bona (personal name) and cirice. Bona may be a short form of the Latin name Bonifatius (i.e Boniface), that the church is dedicated to. St Boniface was born in Devon ~675 and became renowned for taking the Christian gospel to the heathen tribes of modern-day Germany, but may have also been regarded with great respect (venerated) here during the Anglo-Saxon period. The church of St Boniface is early Norman, but may have been built on the site of the old Saxon one. St Boniface Down is also named after St Boniface.

== Geography ==
Bonchurch is situated on a stable section of former landslip, its main street (Bonchurch Village Road) running east–west in a valley sheltered to the north by cliffs, and to the south by The Mount, a ridge of slipped rock. Bonchurch Village Road has an adjacent landscaped pond, fed by a spring, on the site of former withy beds. The Shanklin-Ventnor route originally passed through Bonchurch, descending the cliff by the steep Bonchurch Shute; now it is bypassed by the clifftop A3055 Leeson Road.

== History ==
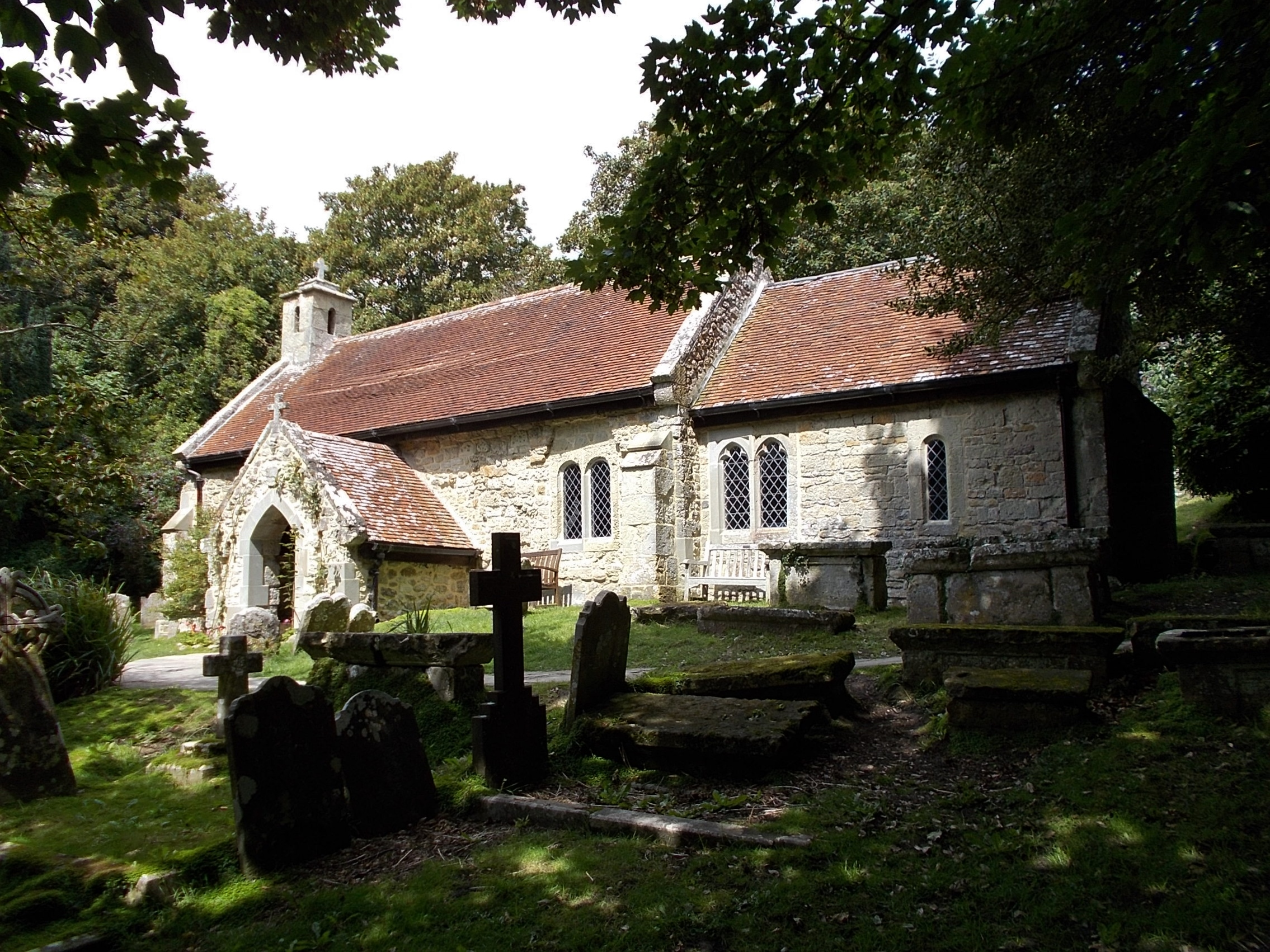
Old St Boniface Church

The presence of a water spring known locally as 'The Source' behind the southern wall of the old church, is believed to be the reason why humans first settled in the area where present-day Bonchurch is located. A prehistoric race lived in the area around the Undercliff, land which was wild forest. Evidence has also been found showing that the people that lived during the Stone Age had lived near to the water spring. Five burial mounds have been discovered at St. Boniface Down. Evidence has also been discovered showing that the Romans established a settlement in the area.

The Saxon patron saint, St. Boniface, is believed to have visited the Isle of Wight, and possibly the area where Bonchurch is now located, in the 8th century. Legend states that monks from Lyra in Normandy landed at Monks Bay, and erected a building in dedication to St. Boniface. This building could be the wooden building which is believed to have existed in the 9th century where the Old Church now stands.

The first documented proof of the existence of Bonchurch is found in the Domesday Book. In the Domesday Book, the settlement was called Bonecerce. 'Cerce' is Anglo-Saxon for 'church', whilst 'Bone' is presumed to have been derived from St. Boniface.

Bonchurch has two churches. The oldest one is called the Old Church. The Domesday Book recorded its existence. See Old St. Boniface Church, Bonchurch and the Parish church, St. Boniface Church, Bonchurch.

In July 1545, the Battle of Bonchurch was fought. 500 French soldiers had landed at the coast near Bonchurch, one of three landings that took place on the coastline of the Isle of Wight by French soldiers. 300 Isle of Wight militiamen engaged the French forces, and the militiamen won the engagement. Some accounts state that local women participated in the battle by shooting arrows at the French soldiers. The victory is considered to have decisively stopped the French invasion of the Isle of Wight.

Soon after the battle, a number of men from the French fleet which had retreated from the Solent after the Battle of the Solent landed on the coast near Bonchurch. The men were engaged in a military action by English soldiers whilst they were on a mission to collect fresh water on the island. A French senior officer, Chevalier D'Aux, was killed. His body was buried in Bonchurch, but was exhumed and taken back to France in 1548 after the war between England and France had ceased.

In the late 1830s and onward, the hitherto rural Bonchurch was developed for private villas, following land acquisition and sale by the Reverend James White. White married Rosa Hill, heiress to Bonchurch Manor, and subsequently obtained a private act of Parliament, White's Estate Act 1836 (6 & 7 Will. 4. c. 13 Pr.), to overturn parts of his father-in-law's will forbidding development and breakup of the estate. In the mid to late 19th Century, Bonchurch developed into a fashionable centre for writers and artists. Celebrated Victorians such as Charles Dickens, Thomas Carlyle, and Thomas Babington Macaulay, 1st Baron Macaulay came here and stayed in large villas that they rented, often for the season.

The Swinburne family residence East Dene is on the Shute running down to the Old Church; Admiral and Lady Swinburne's son, the poet Algernon Charles Swinburne spent part of his boyhood in Bonchurch, at East Dene, and was buried in 1909 at the Parish New Church, his grave being the subject of a poem by Thomas Hardy. His funeral, attended by crowds of people, aroused controversy as Algernon Swinburne was an atheist and his friends attempted to disrupt the funeral believing it should have no religious content.

In 1931 the civil parish had a population of 502. On 1 April 1933 the parish was abolished and merged with Ventnor, part also went to form Sandown Shanklin.

== Pop culture ==
In the 2006 TV Robin Hood, Much is made Earl of Bonchurch in the episode "A Thing or Two About Loyalty". It is implied it is not far from Locksley, but the non-fictional geography is different.

The village is also the setting of Graham Masterton's supernatural horror novel Prey and Benjamin Roberts's supernatural thriller The Moondish.

Bonchurch, and its church is featured in the Commodore 64 videogame Spirit of the Stones, in which the game itself is set on the Isle of Wight itself.

== Notable residents ==
The engineer Thomas Rumble retired to Bonchurch for health reasons and died there in 1883. He is buried in the New Churchyard there.

In 1891, American chemists Arthur Michael and Helen Abbott Michael, lived and conducted research in Bonchurch in their private, self-equipped laboratory.

Trevor Duncan (27 February 1924 – 17 December 2005) was an English composer, particularly noted for his light music compositions. Wrote the theme tune to Dr.Finlay's Casebook and longer compositions including St.Boniface Down.

Charles Dickens, author, lived in Bonchurch for 3 months in 1849.

Algernon Charles Swinburne, poet, East Dene, Bonchurch.

Henry De Vere Stacpoole, author of 'The Blue Lagoon', lived in the village for over 40 years, and was buried here in 1951.

Elisabeth Sewell, pioneer of girls' education, author and prolific letter-writer.

Birthplace of Admiral Sir Thomas Hopsonn.

== Transport ==
Southern Vectis route 3 is the main bus service through the upper part of the village, to Newport, Ryde, Sandown and Shanklin.

== Sources ==
- Goodwin, John. Bonchurch from A-Z. Bonchurch: The Bonchurch Trading Company, 1992. ISBN 1-873009-00-3
- Brett, Peter. Bonchurch. Bonchurch: Bonchurch Parochial Church Council.
