= St Catherine's Church, Ventnor =

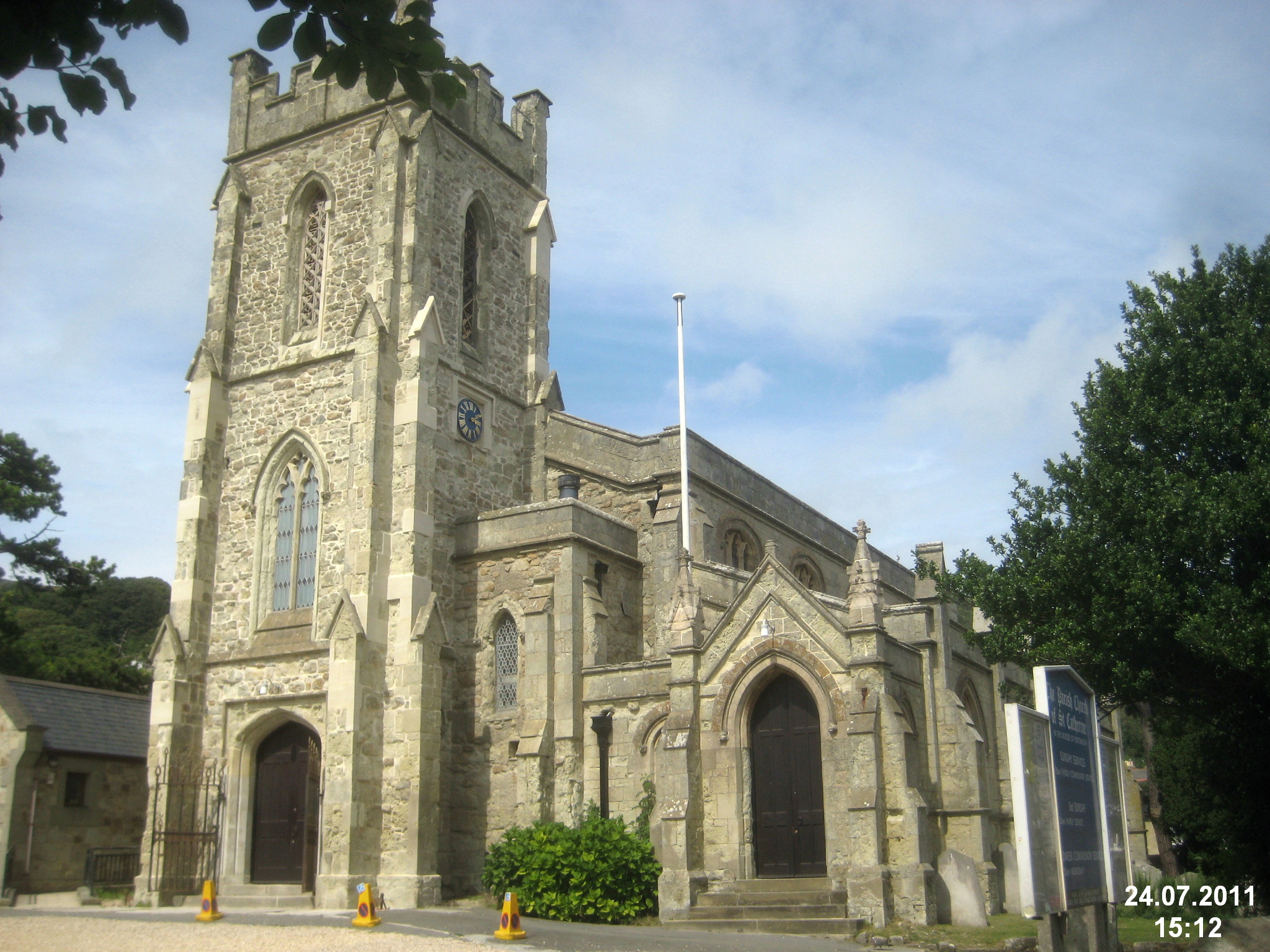
- St Catherine's Church, Ventnor
- 50°35′41″N 01°12′23″W
- Denomination: Church of England
- Churchmanship: Evangelical
- Website: www.ventnorcofe2.btck.co.uk

History
- Dedication: St Catherine

Administration
- Province: Canterbury
- Diocese: Portsmouth
- Parish: Ventnor

Clergy
- Vicar: Revd Tom Burden

St Catherine's, Ventnor is a parish church in the Church of England located in Ventnor, Isle of Wight.

== History ==
The church dates from 1837 and was designed by the architect Robert Ebbels, at a cost of £4,655 funded by John Hambrough of Steephill Castle.

The chancel was a later addition in 1849 and the south aisle in 1897.

Windsor Dudley Cecil Hambrough of Steephill was the victim in the Ardlamont House Murder and was buried in the churchyard in 1893.

== Parish status ==
The church is within a group which includes:

- Old St Boniface Church, Bonchurch
- St Boniface Church, Bonchurch
- Holy Trinity Church, Ventnor
- St Catherine's Church, Ventnor
- Services every Sunday at 10:45
- Cafe Church 1st Sunday of every month
- The Hub Coffee shop open mornings Monday to Saturday

== Organ ==
The church has a pipe organ by James Jepson Binns. A specification of the organ can be found on the National Pipe Organ Register.

=== List of musicians ===
- Michele Brock, John Holder, Roger Glover
