= Holy Trinity Church, Ventnor =

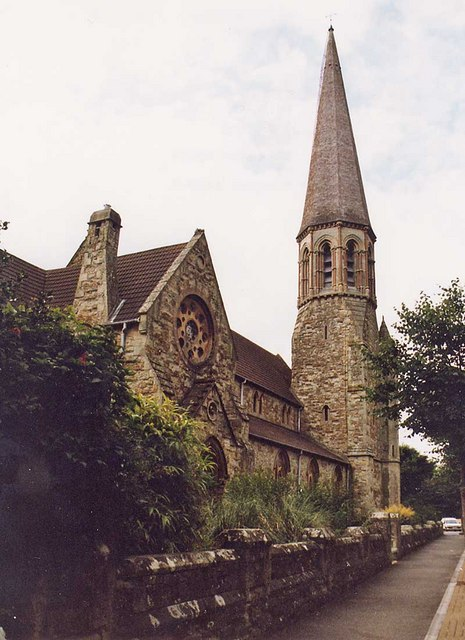
- Holy Trinity Church, Ventnor
- 50°35′52″N 01°11′48″W
- Denomination: Church of England
- Churchmanship: High Church
- Website: http://www.ventnorcofe2.btck.co.uk/ParishChurches/HolyTrinity

History
- Dedication: Holy Trinity

Administration
- Province: Canterbury
- Diocese: Portsmouth
- Parish: Ventnor

Clergy
- Vicar: Revd Tom Burden

Holy Trinity Church, Ventnor is a parish church in the Church of England located in Ventnor, Isle of Wight.

== History ==
The church dates from 1860 to 1862 and was designed by the architect Charles Edmund Giles. The first vicar was Revd. Arthur Lewis Babington Peile (between 1862–1884), who was also Hon Chaplain to Queen Victoria at Osborne House between 1879 and 1889.

== Parish status ==
The church is within a group which includes:

- Old St. Boniface Church, Bonchurch
- St. Boniface Church, Bonchurch
- Holy Trinity Church, Ventnor
- St. Catherine's Church, Ventnor

== Stained glass ==
The church contains stained-glass windows by Clayton and Bell.

== Organ ==
The church has a pipe organ by Forster and Andrews dating from 1865. The organ was rebuilt and enlarged in 1908 by W J Burton, organbuilder of Winchester, at the expense of Charles Boyd, also of Winchester, a sometime singer in the church choir. The rebuilt organ was dedicated by Edwin H Lemare. A specification of the organ can be found on the National Pipe Organ Register.

=== List of organists ===
- Rupert Mossley ca. 1949
- Edwin Lemare (father of Edwin Lemare)1861-1923
- Adeliza Burndred (until 1989)
- Duncan Williams 1991-on
