= Edwin Lemare =

English organist and composer (1865–1934)

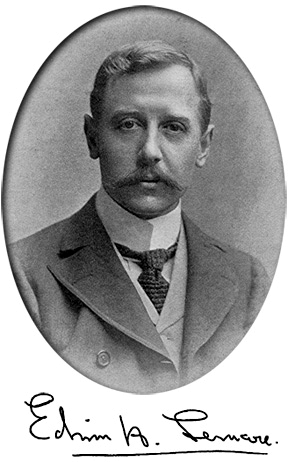
Edwin Lemare

Edwin Henry Lemare (Note: Frequently misspelled "Lamare" in early publications) (9 September 1865 – 24 September 1934) was an English organist and composer who lived the latter part of his life in the United States. He was one of the most highly regarded and highly paid organists of his generation, as well as the greatest performer and one of the most important composers of the late Romantic English-American Organ School.

== Biography ==
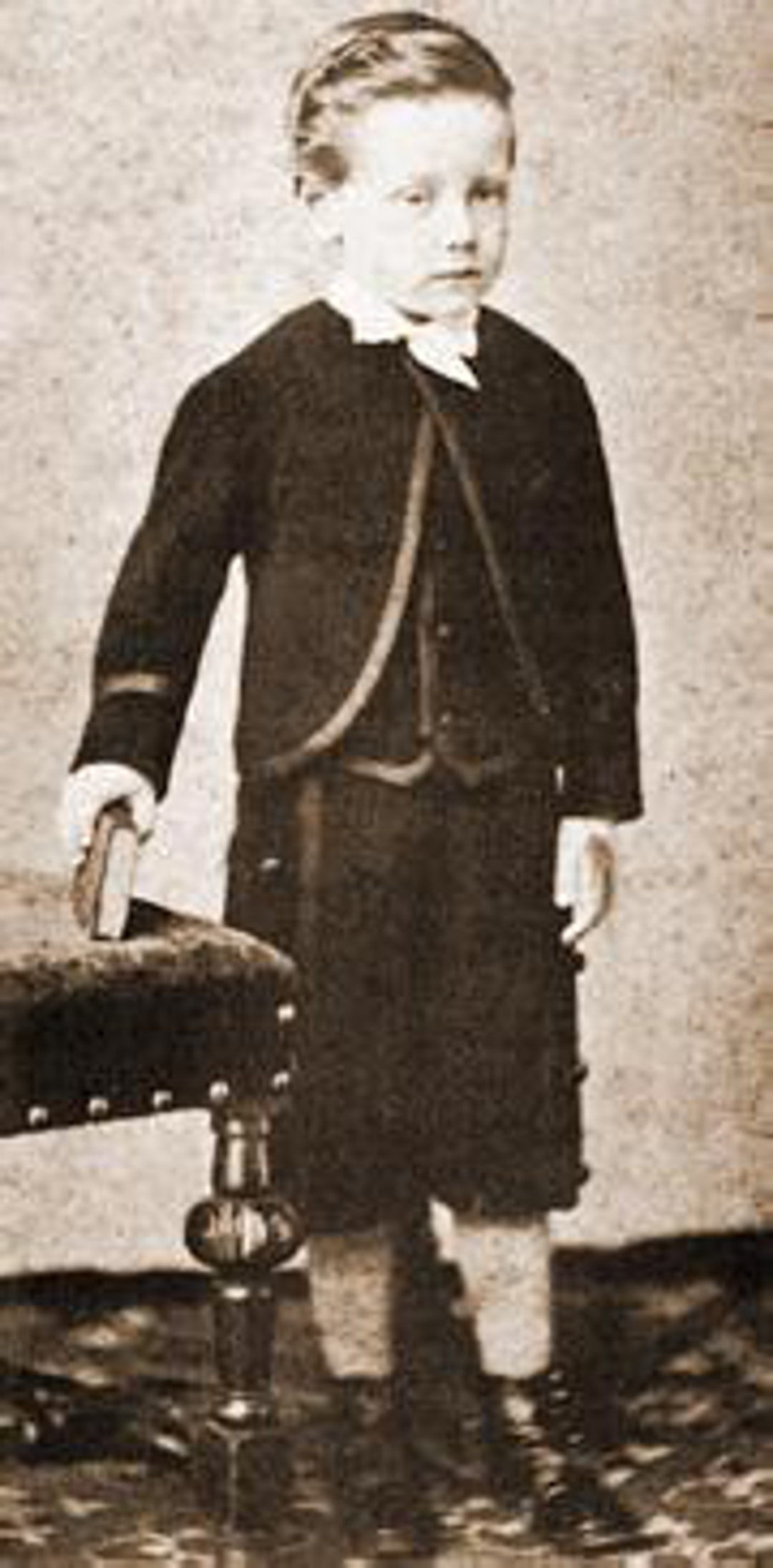
Lemare, 6 years old

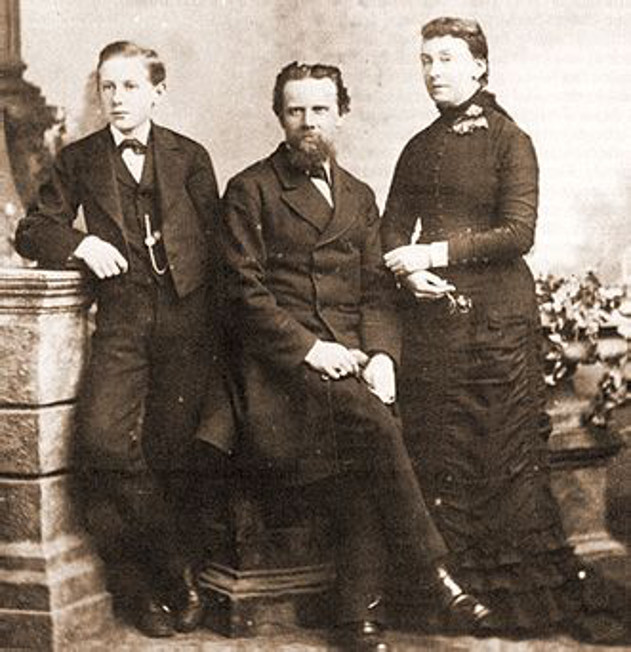
Aged 12 with parents

Edwin H. Lemare was born in Ventnor, on the Isle of Wight on 9 September 1865. His birth year is sometimes erroneously stated as 1866, including in Lemare's own autobiography Organs I Have Met. He received his early musical training as a chorister and organist under his father (a music seller, also called Edwin Lemare) at Holy Trinity Church. He then spent three years at the Royal Academy of Music from 1876 on a Goss Scholarship, where he studied under Sir George Alexander Macfarren, Walter Cecil Macfarren, Dr Charles Steggall and Dr Edmund Hart Turpin. He obtained the F.C.O. (Fellow of the College of Organists, later to become the Royal College of Organists) in 1886. He became an organ professor and examiner for the Associated Board of the Royal Schools of Music in 1892.

He gained fame by playing two recitals a day, over a hundred in total, on the one-manual Brindley & Foster organ in the Inventions Exhibition in 1884. He gave bi-weekly recitals at the Park Hall, Cardiff, from 1886; this was followed by further appointments around Great Britain.

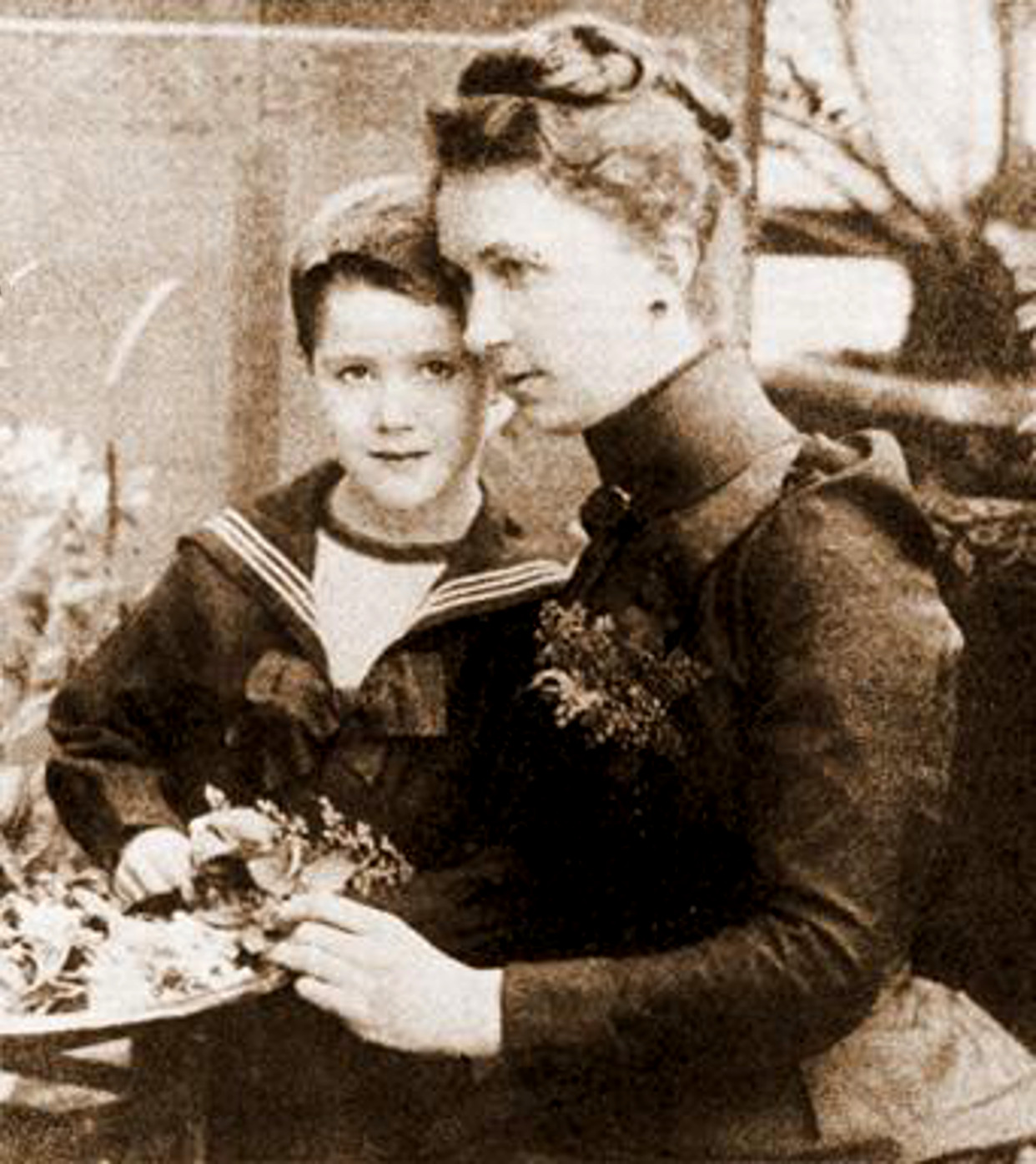
Marian Broomhead Colton-Fox, with a nephew, 1886

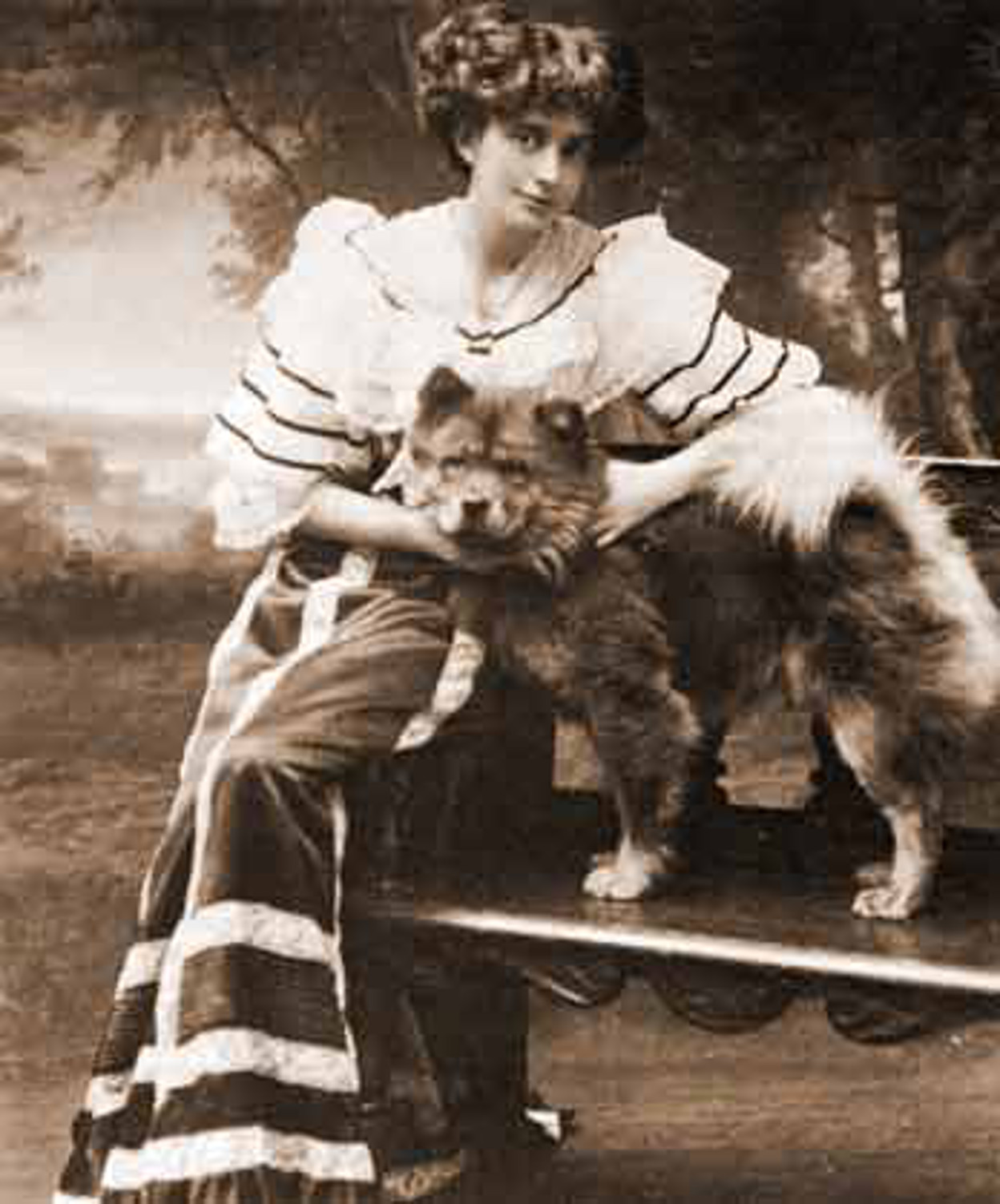
Elsie Francis Reith, 1890

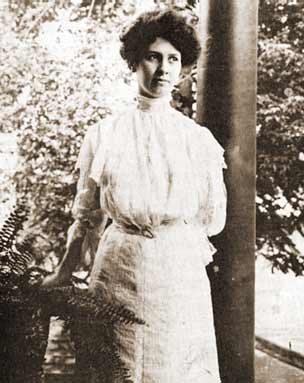
Charlotte Bauersmith, 1900

While organist at Sheffield Parish Church, he eloped with Marian Broomhead Colton-Fox because her father, a well-known lawyer, did not approve of him.

After eight years of marriage, they were divorced and Lemare married Elsie Francis Reith. They were divorced in 1909.

Lemare left England for the United States where he married Charlotte Bauersmith, twenty years his junior, shortly after arriving in New York. She was herself an organist and sometimes substituted for him.

After apparently treating church services in London as concerts, he left for a hundred-recital tour of the United States and Canada from 1900/01, and stayed in North America for most of the remainder of his life. He also toured Europe, Australia, and New Zealand, where he helped to design the organs for Auckland Town Hall and Melbourne Town Hall. He died in Hollywood, California. He is interred in the Hall of Righteousness Crypt No. 6691 at Forest Lawn Memorial Park, Glendale, California.

=== Organist posts held ===
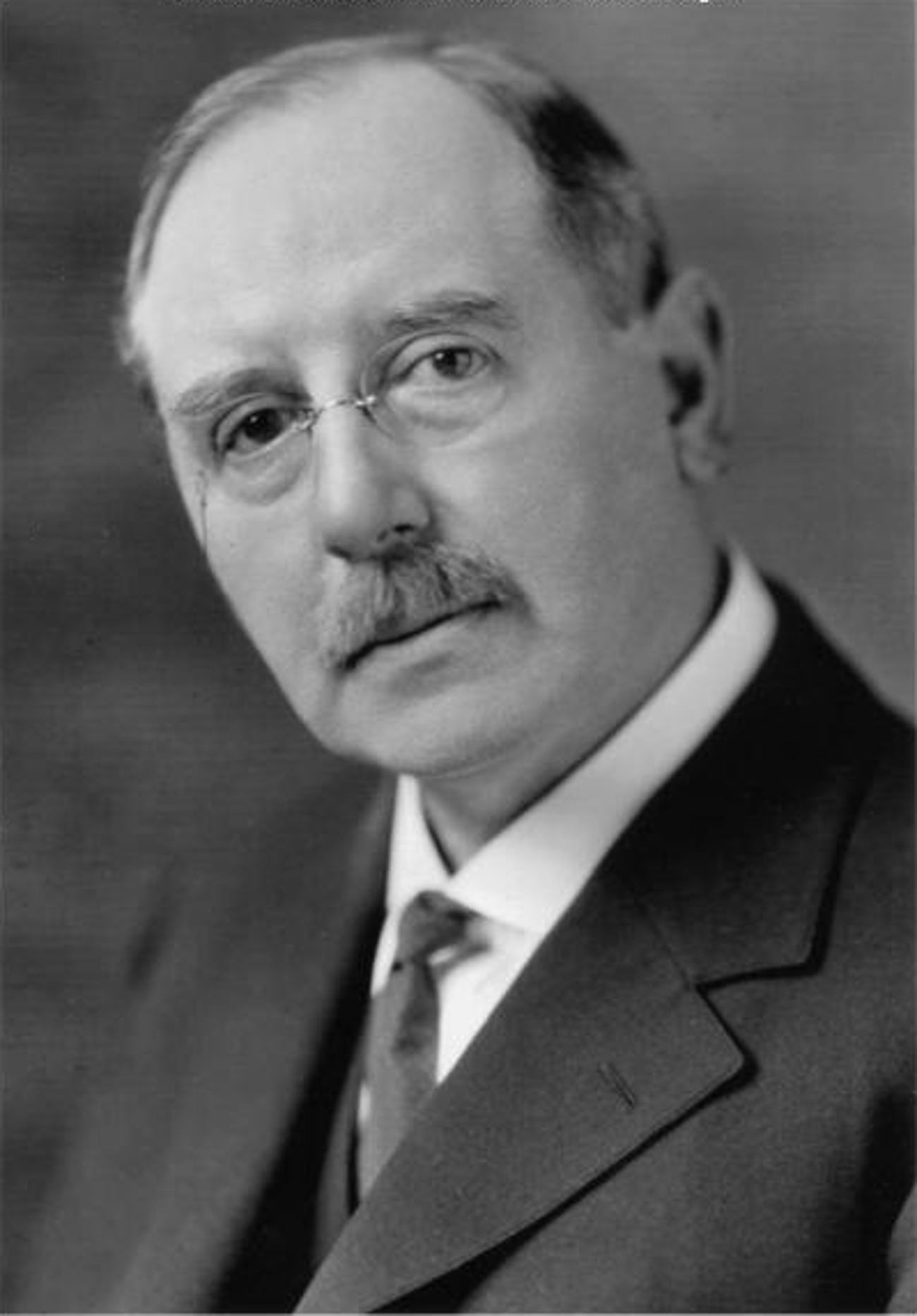
Lemare in 1921

- St. Mary's, Brookfield, Highgate
- St. John's, Finsbury Park, 1882
- Park Hall, Cardiff
- Sheffield Parish Church, 1886
- Albert Hall, Sheffield, 1886
- Holy Trinity, Sloane Street, London, 1892–1895
- St. Margaret's, Westminster, London, 1897–1902
- Carnegie Institute, Pittsburgh, 1902–1905
- Panama–Pacific International Exposition, San Francisco, 1915
- City Organist, San Francisco, 1917–1920
- Municipal Organist, Kotzschmar Memorial Organ, Portland, Maine, 1921–1923
- Civic Organist, Chattanooga, Tennessee, 1924–1929

== Abilities as organist and composer ==
As a player, he had a very large repertoire and was in constant demand; he was the most highly paid organist of his day, and earned previously unheard-of sums when he went to America. He performed to as many as 10,000 people, and travelled the Atlantic so often that crew members of the ocean liners knew him by name. Some evidence of his excellent playing survives to this day: he made 24 player rolls for the Aeolian Company and 96 for Welte in Freiburg, which have been played again and recorded. He was also a very capable improviser; he recorded and transcribed some of his improvisations for publication. Percy Fletcher wrote his virtuosic Festival Toccata for Lemare in 1915.

Of his many compositions for the organ, many are light music designed to show off the tone and capabilities of the huge organs of his day, and have fallen out of favour (though Christopher Herrick has recorded some of Lemare's music in his Organ Fireworks series). Unusually, his qualities as a composer are generally thought to have declined rather than improved with age; his first two organ symphonies are considered to rival those of his French contemporaries in quality.

=== Moonlight and Roses ===
The Andantino in D♭, known as Moonlight and Roses, Op. 83, No. 2 (1888), is one of Lemare's few well-known original compositions. It became so popular that he was asked to play it in nearly all his concerts. It sold tens of thousands of copies, though he did not initially make any money out of it; when it was published in 1892 by Robert Cocks in London, he received a flat fee of three guineas. Lemare did not call it Moonlight and Roses nor did he attach any words to the tune; it was American songwriters Ben Black and Charles N. Daniels (under the pseudonym Neil Moret) who added these words to the melody, without permission, in 1921:

Moonlight and roses
Bring wonderful mem'ries of you.
My heart reposes
In beautiful thoughts so true.

June light discloses
Love's olden dreams sparkling anew,
Moonlight and roses
Bring mem'ries of you.

The piece became extremely popular and sold over one million copies. Lemare threatened legal action in 1925, resulting in his obtaining a share of the royalties; he finally profited from his popular tune.

The piece uses the technique known as thumbing down; the left hand plays an accompaniment on the choir manual, while the fingers of the right hand play the tune on the solo manual, and the thumb of the right hand simultaneously plays the tune on the great manual, in parallel sixths. The player is thus playing on three manuals at once.

"Moonlight and Roses" was sung by Roy Rogers in the 1943 film Song of Texas.

The song also became a U.S. Pop (#51) and Easy Listening (#5) hit for Vic Dana in 1965. It was entitled, "Moonlight and Roses (Bring Memories of You)."

== Compositions for organ ==
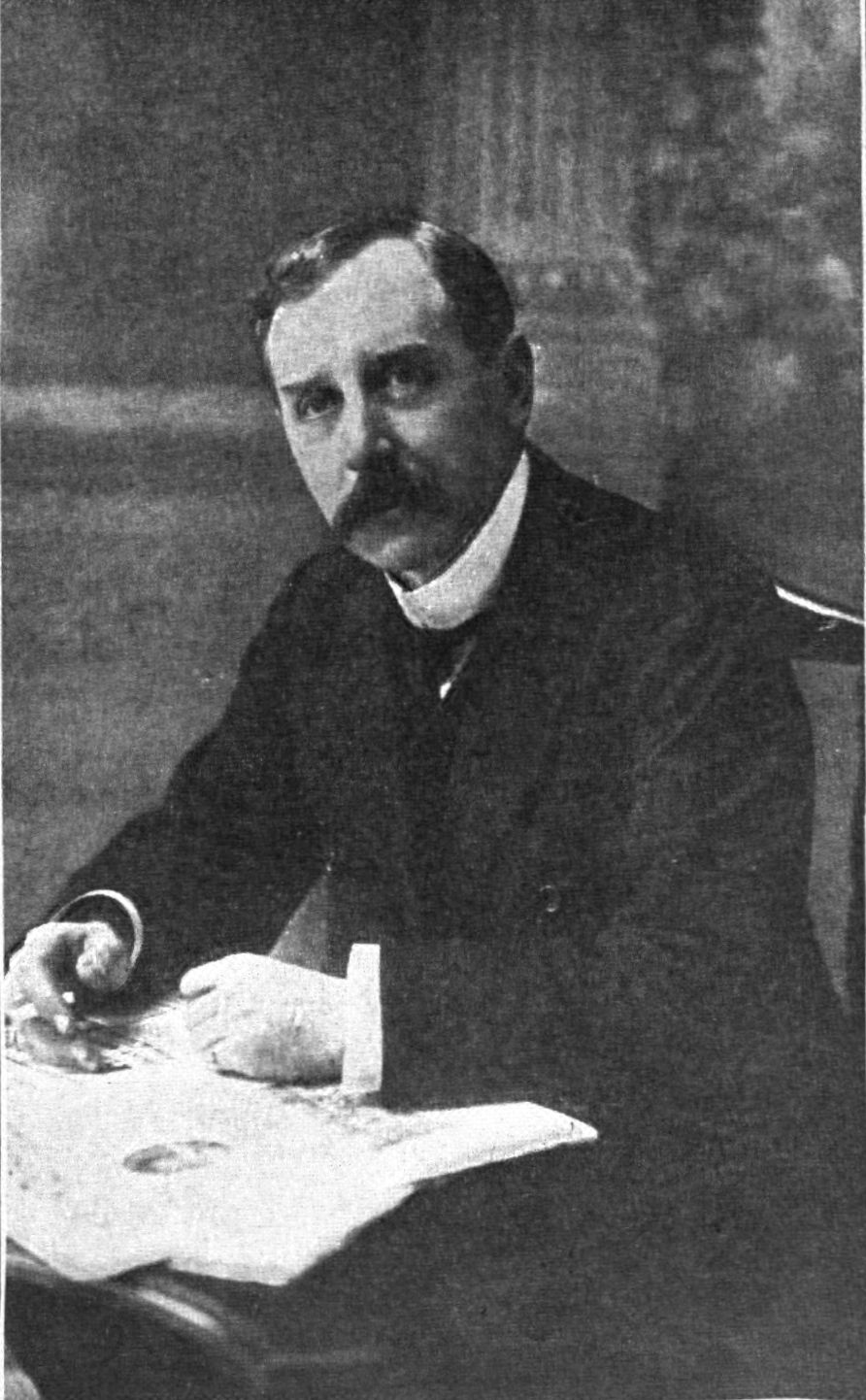
Lemare c. 1903

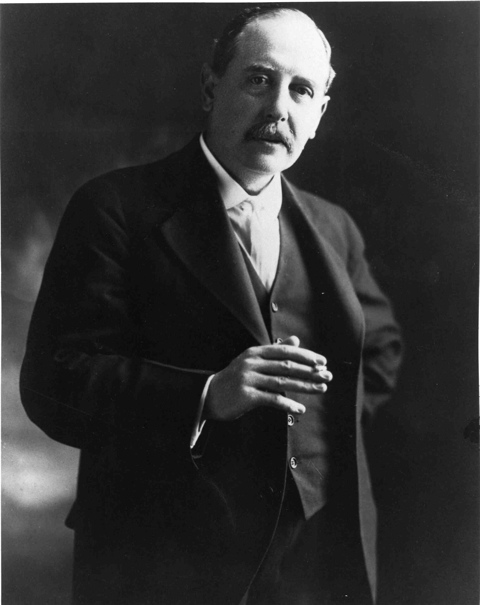
Lemare in later life

Published as The Organ Music of Edwin H. Lemare, edited by Wayne Leupold (Wayne Leupold Editions/E. C. Schirmer). Series I (Original Compositions): Volume I, II, III and IV; Series II (Transcriptions). He also composed church music and an orchestral symphony.

=== Original ===
- Allegretto in B minor
- Andante Cantabile in F (Op. 37)
- Andantino in D♭ (also known as Moonlight & Roses)
- Arcadian Idyll (Op. 52) (1: Serenade; 2: Musette; 3: Solitude)
- Barcarolle in A♭
- Bell Scherzo (Op. 89)
- Bénédiction Nuptiale (Op. 85)
- Berceuse in D
- Cantique d'Amour (Op. 47)
- Caprice Orientale (Op. 46)
- Chanson d'Été in B♭
- Chant de Boneur (Op. 62)
- Chant sans paroles in D
- Cloches Sonores (Basso Ostinato) – symphonic sketch (Op. 63)
- Communion Peace (Op. 68)
- Concert Fantasia in F
- Concert Fantasy On the tune 'Hanover'
- Concertstück No 1 – In the form of a Polonaise (Op. 80)
- Concertstück No 2 – In form of a Tarantella (Op. 90)
- Contemplation in D minor (Op. 42)
- Elegy in G
- Evening Pastorale The Curfew (Op. 128)
- Fantaisie Fugue in G minor (Op. 48)
- Fantasie Dorienne in the form of variations (Op. 101)
- Gavotte Moderne in A♭

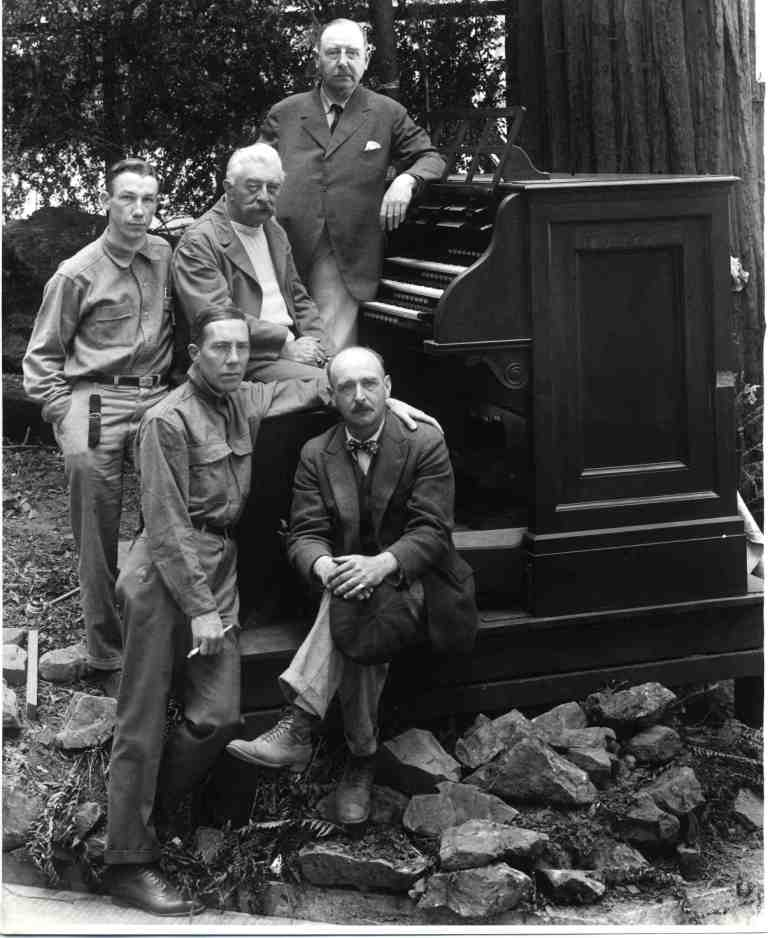
Lemare (top) with some friends

- Gavotte à la cour (Op. 84)
- Idyll in E♭
- Impromptu in A
- Intermezzo: Moonlight (Op. 83/2)
- Intermezzo in B♭ (Op. 39)
- Irish Air from County Derry (arr. by)
- Madrigal in D♭
- Marche Heroïque (Op. 74)
- Marche Solennelle in E♭
- Meditation in D♭ (Op. 38)
- Minuet Nuptiale (Op. 103)
- Nocturne in B minor (Op. 41)
- Pastorale No 2 in C
- Pastorale Poem (Op. 54)
- Pastorale in E
- Rêverie in E♭ (Op. 20)
- Rhapsody in C minor (Op. 43)
- Romance in D♭
- Romance in D♭ (No 2) (Op. 112)
- Rondo Capriccio
- Salut d'Amour (Op. 127)
- Scherzo
- Second Andantino in D♭
- Sonata No 1 in F (Op. 95) (1: Maestoso; 2: Largo; 3: Scherzo; 4: Intermezzo; 5: Finale)
- Soutenir (A Study on One Note)
- Spring Song – From the South (Op. 56)
- Summer Sketches (1: Dawn; 2: The Bee; 3: The Cuckoo; 4: Twilight; 5: Evening) (Op. 73)
- Sunshine (Op. 83/1)
- Symphony No 1 in G minor (1: Allegro Moderato; 2: Adagio Cantabile; 3: Scherzo; 4: Finale) (Op. 35)
- Symphony No 2 in D minor (1: Maestoso con fuoco; 2: Adagio patetico; 3: Scherzo; 4: Allegro giusto) (Op. 50)
- Tears and Smiles (1: Tears; 2: Smiles) (Op. 133)
- Toccata di concerto
- Twilight Sketches (Op. 138) (1: Sundown; 2: The Glow-Worm; 3: The Fire Fly; 4: Dusk)

=== Transcriptions ===
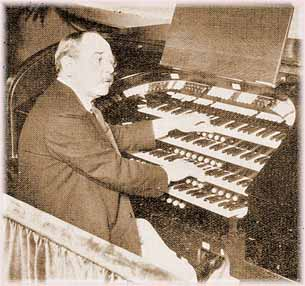
Lemare at the organ

Lemare was a prolific transcriber of orchestral music for the organ for his own performance in concerts. While there was likely an element of pure showmanship to these transcriptions – which allowed Lemare to display his uncanny skill as a transcriber of major symphonic works, as well as his phenomenal technique – Lemare sincerely believed he was also performing a service in letting concert audiences in mid-sized American towns hear important orchestral works from Europe that would otherwise go unknown in locales with no resident symphony orchestra. Many of his transcriptions are still performed today, especially those he did of the works of Richard Wagner.

==== Johannes Brahms ====
- Akademische Festouvertüre (Op. 80)
- Ungarischer Tanz No. 5

==== Edward Elgar ====
- Gavotte in A
- Idylle (Op. 4/1)
- Pomp and Circumstance March No. 1 (Op. 39)
- Salut d'Amour (Op. 12)
- Sursum Corda (Élévation) (Op. 11)
- Triumphal March from Caractacus (Op. 35)

==== Camille Saint-Saëns ====
- Danse macabre (Op. 40)

==== Richard Wagner ====
- "Entrance of the Gods into Valhalla" from Das Rheingold
- Overture to Der fliegende Holländer
- Overture to Die Meistersinger von Nürnberg
- Overture to Rienzi
- Overture to Tannhäuser
- "Ride of the Valkyries" from Die Walküre
- "Wotan's Farewell and Magic Fire Music" from Die Walküre
- Prelude to act 3 and "Bridal Music" from Lohengrin
- "Vorspiel und Liebestod" From Tristan und Isolde

== Notes ==
Cultural offices
Preceded by Thomas Trimnell	Organist and Master of the Choristers of Sheffield Cathedral; 1886–1892	Succeeded by Thomas William Hanforth
