= Percy Fletcher =

British composer

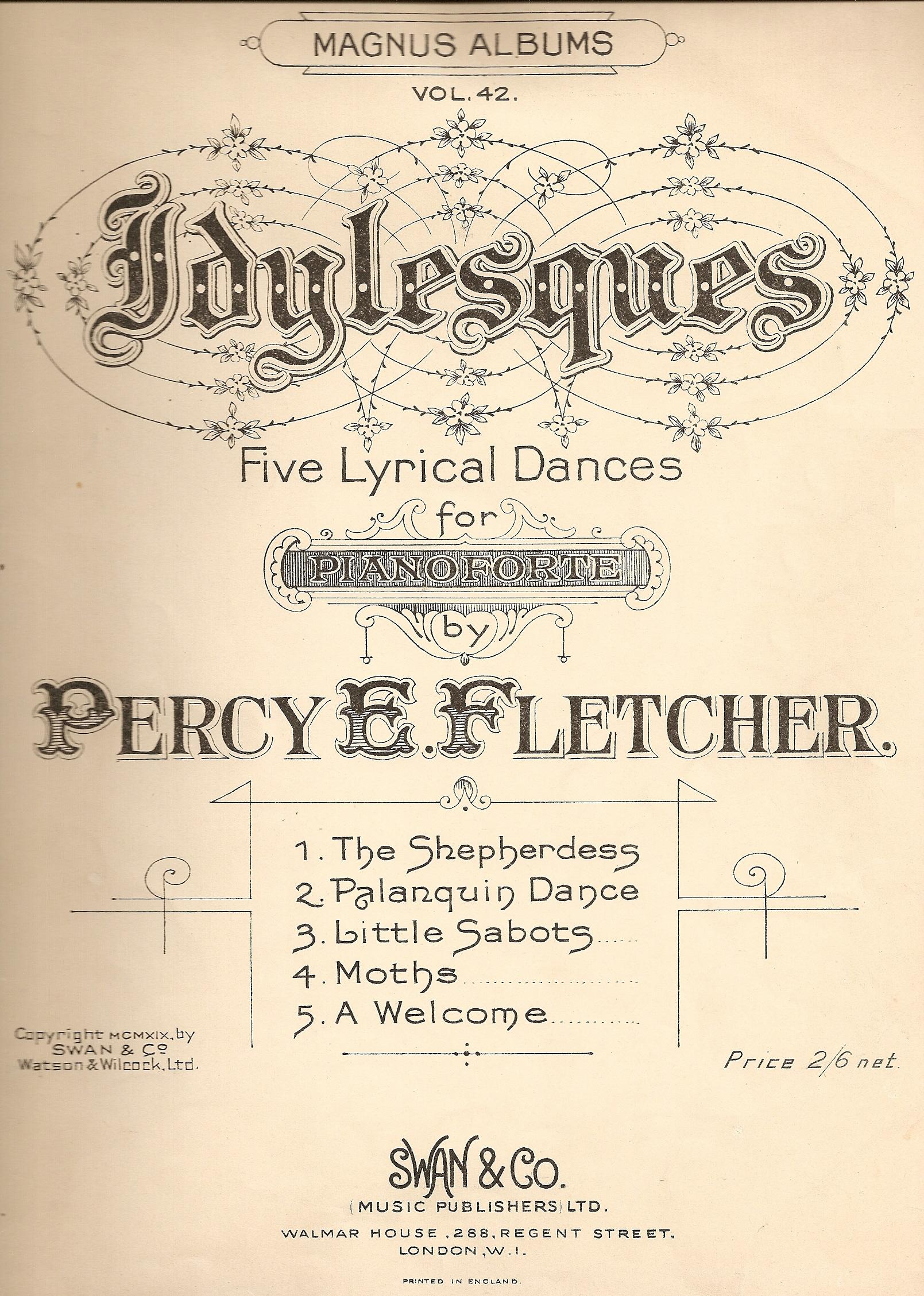
The cover page of Percy Fletcher's Idylesques.

Percy Eastman Fletcher (12 December 1879 – 10 September 1932) was a British composer of classical music best known today for his brass and military band music. He also worked as a highly successful musical director at London theatres.

== Life ==
Born in Derby, Fletcher was largely self-taught, though his parents were both musical and he learned to play violin, piano and organ before embarking on a career of theatrical conducting. He took positions at the Prince of Wales, Savoy and the Drury Lane Theatre under Johnston Forbes-Robertson.

In 1915 he was appointed musical director at His Majesty's Theatre by Sir Herbert Tree, where he stayed until his death. Here, from 1916, he conducted (and mostly orchestrated) the music for the record-breaking five year run of Frederic Norton's Chu Chin Chow. As its successor, Fletcher composed his own musical comedy, Cairo, which ran for 267 performances in 1921. A further comedy, The Good Old Days was produced at Her Majesty's in 1925.

Although working in London, Fletcher lived in Farnborough, Hampshire for many years. There is a blue plaque marking his former residence on Sycamore Road, Farnborough Park. He died from a cerebral haemorrhage in Holloway Sanatorium, Virginia Water, aged 52.

== Music ==
Works commissioned from Fletcher for brass band competitions include the tone poem Labour and Love used by the Irwell Springs Band to win the 1913 National Championships. This piece is often regarded as a significant moment in the development of the modern brass band movement and repertoire. It was followed by An Epic Symphony, used as the test piece for the Championship Section of the National Championships in 1926, and revived regularly since. Stephen Arthur Allen holds that both of his brass band works frame the so-called 'Silver Era' (1913-26) and that An Epic Symphony raised the curtain on the 'Golden Era', being a formal model for Gustav Holst's A Moorside Suite, Arthur Bliss' suite Kenilworth and the lesser known Pride of Race by Kenneth Wright. Philip Scowcroft rates An Epic Symphony as his "most serious work in any medium". It was recorded by the Black Dyke Band in 1975. An article written for the brass band website 4barsrest.com places Fletcher amongst the ten greatest brass band composers.

Fletcher also composed ballads, works for chorus, a string quartet, and suites for light orchestra, as well as the Passion of Christ (1922) and organ voluntaries for church use. Intended to be performed by smaller, less experienced choirs, the Passion is sometimes used as an alternative to Stainer's The Crucifixion, though its influences derive more from Elgar than from Mendelssohn. The orchestral suites (most of them also transcribed for piano), such as Rustic Revels (1918) and Sylvan Scenes (1921), suggest Fletcher's responses to Grieg and Coleridge-Taylor. Of the suites, Woodland Pictures gained widespread popularity, as did the waltz 'Bal Masque' from Parisienne Sketches (1914). Some vintage recordings of movements from these suites have been re-issued by Cavendish Music.

Fletcher also orchestrated the Hiawatha (1919) and Minnehaha (1925) suites from Coleridge-Taylor's posthumous music.

== Works ==
- At Gretna Green, suite for orchestra (1926)
- Ballade and Bergomask for orchestra (1931)
- A Choral Rhapsody on Scottish Airs, for chorus and orchestra (1915)
- Cupid's Garland, soloists, chorus and orchestra (1931)
- The Deacon's Masterpiece or The Wonderful "One-Hoss Shay" (1911)
- An Epic Symphony for brass band (1926)
- Famous Beauties, suite for orchestra
- Festival Toccata for organ (1915, written for Edwin Lemare)
- Folk Tune and Fiddle Dance for strings (1914)
- Fountain Reverie for organ (1915)
- Hymn Tune Voluntaries for the Organ (1906)
- Idylesques (a.k.a. Five Lyrical Pieces, 1919)
- In the Olden Style, suite for orchestra
- Labour And Love, tone poem for brass band (1913)
- Parisienne Sketches suite for orchestra (1914)
- Prelude, Interlude and Postlude, for organ, Op.27 (1910)
- The Passion of Christ for chorus (1922)
- Ring Out, Wild Bells, a "Festival Carol" for choir and organ (1914)
- Rustic Revels, suite for orchestra (1918)
- A Song of Victory for SATB chorus and piano
- The Spirit of Pageantry, march (1911)
- Sylvan Scenes, suite for orchestra (1921)
- Vanity Fair, overture
- The Walrus and the Carpenter, for chorus (1910)
- Woodland Pictures, suite for orchestra (1920)
