= Thomas Rumble =

Thomas William Rumble FRSE MICE MIME FGS (1832–1883) was a 19th-century British railway engineer (and locomotive designer), architect, geologist and adventurer.

== Life ==
He was born in London on Boxing Day, 26 December 1832. He was educated at Reading school by Richard Valpy. Around 1847 he joined his father's architectural practice in London.

Around 1848 he went to the east coast of the United States. In 1850 he obtained the post of Assistant Engineer on the Central Railway of New Jersey. Jumping jobs he was also then involved in laying out the Erie and Forest Lawn Cemetery, Berks County Baths and Buffalo Public Washhouses.

He returned to England in the summer of 1852 undertaking the construction of All Saints Church at Kensington Park. However, with a continuing wanderlust went to India at the end of the summer of 1853, gaining employment on the Bombay, Baroda and Central India Railway. However, ill-health caused him to return to England in February 1854. After a short period of freelancing as Superintending Engineer for the Arthington Water Works under Thomas Hawksley he set up an office in the Westminster district of London. In 1857 he was appointed Engineer to the Atlas Steel Works in Sheffield.

In 1860 he became a Member of the Institute of Mechanical Engineers. His address was then given as 6 Broad Street Buildings in London. In 1866 he appears as the designer of a locomotive for the Great Western Railway. In 1869 he made a study tour to the United States to look at recent technological improvements. A further visit in 1872 included visiting Chicago after the Great Fire to study how bank vaults had survived the inferno. On his return to London he oversaw the construction of extensive new vaults for the National Safe Deposit Company on Queen Victoria Street.

In 1876 he became Chief Engineer to the Southwark and Vauxhall Water Company. This position included laying the main 30 inch water main under the River Thames.

In 1881 he was elected a Fellow of the Royal Society of Edinburgh. His proposers were John Frederick Bateman, Robert Etheridge, James Abernethy and Sir John Hawkshaw.

His health began to fail in 1881, suffering from anemia (probably pernicious anaemia contracted during his trip to India). He retired to the Isle of Wight late in 1882.

He died on 21 April 1883 at Bonchurch on the Isle of Wight and is buried there in the New Churchyard.
