= Bonchurch Manor =

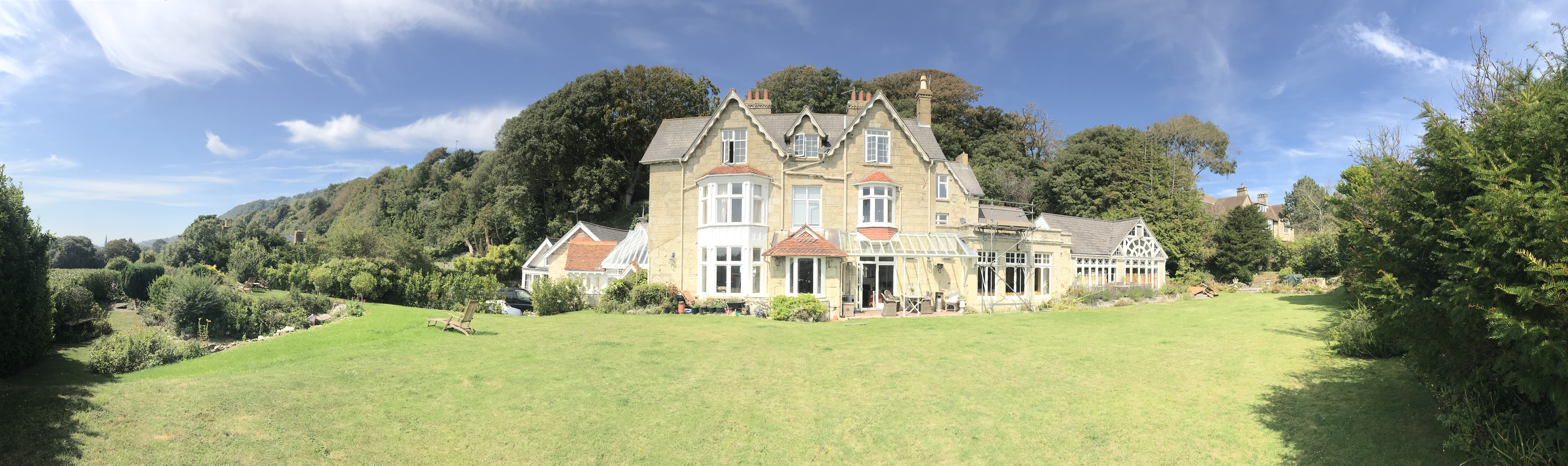
- Bonchurch Manor c. 2016
- Interactive map of the Bonchurch Manor area

General information
- Type: Manor house
- Location: Bonchurch, United Kingdom

Bonchurch Manor is a manor house on the Isle of Wight, situated in Bonchurch.

== History ==
Bonchurch was held before the Conquest as an alod by Estan of Earl Godwin. In 1086 it belonged to William son of Azor, and was of considerable worth, doubtless owing to the grazing value of its chalk downs. Sir John Oglander gives the following fanciful account of its early history: 'The church was erected in the reign of William the Conqueror by John de Argenton, a Frenchman, to whom William Fitz Osbern gave Bonchurch. Argenton "got it to be made a parish by means of his brother's son Walkelin, then Bishop of Winton." ' The Argenteins, however, do not seem to have held any land in the Isle of Wight until the end of the 12th century. It was one of the manors held by John de Lisle at the end of the 13th century of the honour of Carisbrooke Castle, and it followed the same descent as West Court in Shorwell (q.v.) to the Popham and Hill families. The part held by the Hills passed to Rosa daughter of Lieut.-Col. Charles Fitz Maurice Hill, who married the Rev. James White. The Bonchurch estate, belonging to Mrs. Rosa White, was put up for sale in 1836 and passed to different owners. In 1863 the manorial rights were purchased by Dr. Leeson, but none are now exercised. Bonchurch Manor is currently owned by Christopher Rose, an attorney, and his wife Khadine.

Clarification of house names and sites: The 19th-century villa Hawthorn(e) Dene (on Bonchurch Shute) is not the medieval/manorial house of Bonchurch. The older Hill family residence that functioned as the manor house was St Boniface Cottage (later “St Boniface House”), sited near what is now the St Boniface School playing field/Bishop’s Field; it was later demolished.^{[1][2]} Hawthorn(e) Dene was a mid-Victorian villa developed on former farmland and is documented from the 1850s–60s; by the late 19th and early 20th century it operated as a sanatorium (variously “Hawthorne Dene” / “Hawthorndene”), not as the medieval manor house.^{[3][4][5]} In the 20th century the hotel styling “Bonchurch Manor (Hotel)” was applied to Hawthorn(e) Dene, which has contributed to later confusion in secondary sources.^{[6][7]}

1. Colonel Hill, Rosa Hill's father, was seated at Bonchurch House, also known as Bonchurch Cottage. The house, located behind St Boniface Road and Maples Drive (now allotments), was demolished in 1890 to avoid paying tax. Numerous engravings of the period illustrate the manor house. Paradise Lost? The Lost Buildings of the East Wight (Isle of Wight AONB/Down to the Coast), note on St Boniface Cottage → St Boniface House and location opposite the former St Boniface Primary School. downtothecoast.co.uk

2. “Introduction to In an Undercliff Garden” (Isle of Wight History) — “Col. William Hill, the Lord of the Manor, lived in St Boniface Cottage, which stood in what is now the playing field of St Boniface School.” iwhistory.co.uk

3. Kelly’s Directory, 1927 — entry for “Hawthorne Dene (Sanatorium for Women)” at Bonchurch. bartiesworld.co.uk

4. Kelly’s Directory, 1935 — “Hawthorne Dene (Sanatorium for Women)” with medical officer and matron listed. bartiesworld.co.uk

5. Isle of Wight Hospitals history — beds “also available at this time at Hawthorndene in Bonchurch… later an outpost of the LCC…”. iowhospitals.org.uk

6. Ventnor Town Council “Famous Residents” — Canon Edmund Venables lived at Hawthorndene (now Bonchurch Manor Hotel). (Evidence of later hotel name attribution.) Ventnor Town Council

7. 01 Estate Agents listing — “Hawthorn Dene, formerly Bonchurch Manor.” (Modern estate usage showing the name transfer, not manorial continuity.) 01estateagents.com
