= Spirit of the Stones =

1984 video game

- Designer(s): Ian Gray; Lee Braine
- Programmer(s): Ian Gray; Lee Braine
- Writer(s): John Howard Worsley (book author)
- Composer(s): Chris Cox
- Platform(s): Commodore 64
- Release: 1984
- Genre(s): Action
- Mode(s): Single-player

Spirit of the Stones is an action video game for the Commodore 64, set on the Isle of Wight and based on an armchair treasure hunt book of the same name by John Howard Worsley.

Worsley's Spirit of the Stones book was published in 1983. As with other contemporary armchair treasure hunts, Worsley hid 40 talismen and the larger Great Wight Eye diamond talisman in locations around the Isle of Wight, and included cryptic clues to their locations in the book. By 1993, 19 of the talismen and the Great Wight Eye had been found; four more were found later. A large-format, full-colour copy of the book was included with the game, and a portion of the game's purchase price went towards a prize fund, enabling players of the game to compete and win prizes without needing to visit the Isle of Wight.

The game's only music track is an arrangement by Chris Cox of Modest Mussorgsky's Night on Bald Mountain.

== Gameplay ==
The player plays as a treasure hunter who needs to gather all 40 diamond talismen plus the Great Wight Eye from the spirit-infested island to win the game. The game starts with a scrolling overview map of the island. When the player enters one of the 21 buildings, the game switches to a platform level and must avoid hazards including arrows and falling objects. Players who completed the game could write to the publisher to claim a prize.

== Reception ==
Home Computing Weekly gave Spirit of the Stones a rating of 3/5 stars; the reviewer enjoyed the action gameplay, but found the puzzles too difficult and the music "annoying after a time".

Commodore Computing International included a news article about the game and a review in its November 1984 issue, giving it an overall rating of 5/5 stars; the reviewer praised the "colourful, imaginative book" and "detailed scrolling map".

Commodore User reviewed the game in its adventure games section, highlighting its novelty as "a kind of Masquerade for the computer literate which marks Commodore's first substantial original title in the genre", but finding the arcade elements "too difficult for the younger player and probably rather too trite for the conventional adventurer".
