= Waipoua River =

Waipoua River is the name of two rivers in New Zealand.

- Waipoua River (Northland)
- Waipoua River (Wellington)
