= List of shipwrecks in September 1883 =

The list of shipwrecks in September 1883 includes ships sunk, foundered, grounded, or otherwise lost during September 1883.

== 1 September ==
List of shipwrecks: 1 September 1883
Ship	State	Description
Aurelia	Spain	The ship was wrecked at Santander with the loss of three of her six crew.
Europa	Germany	The steamship was wrecked on the Wittsand, in the North Sea off Scharhörn.
G I Jones	United States	The barque was driven ashore and wrecked at Stackhouse Cove, Cornwall, United Kingdom with the loss of twelve of the fourteen people on board. She was on a voyage from the Bull River in California to Falmouth, Cornwall.
Lady Bird	United Kingdom	The ship was sighted off Beachy Head, Sussex whilst on a voyage from South Shields, County Durham to Iquique, Chile. No further trace, reported missing.
Sylph	United Kingdom	The ferry was driven ashore and wrecked at Rockferry, Cheshire.
Thetis	United Kingdom	The yacht was wrecked at Bognor, Sussex.
Tintore	United Kingdom	The steamship was holed by her anchor at Cádiz, filling her main hold with water. She was on a voyage from Liverpool, Lancashire, United Kingdom to Vigo and Cádiz.
Unnamed	United Kingdom	A sand barge sank at Padstow, Cornwall with the loss of one of her two crew.

== 2 September ==
List of shipwrecks: 2 September 1883
Ship	State	Description
Annie	United Kingdom	The schooner was driven ashore at the Mumbles, Glamorgan.
Bacchus	France	The lugger was abandoned off Mevagissey, Cornwall, United Kingdom. Her crew were rescued by the Mevagissey Lifeboat. She subsequently came ashore and was wrecked.
Christiana	Norway	The barque was wrecked in Chesil Cove, Dorset, United Kingdom with the loss of two of her crew. She was on a voyage from Drammen to Dartmouth, Devon, United Kingdom.
Claudius	Germany	The steamship was run down and sunk off Adra, Spain. Her crew were rescued by the steamship Redesdale (United Kingdom). Claudius was on a voyage from South Shields, County Durham, United Kingdom to Cartagena, Spain.
Elise	Norway	The barque stranded on Plymouth Hoe, Devon, United Kingdom. Her nine crew were taken off by the lifeboat Clemency ( Royal National Lifeboat Institution). Elise was on a voyage from Pilbas, New Brunswick, Canada to London, United Kingdom.
Ellen Kerr	United Kingdom	The schooner was driven ashore at Wexford. Her crew were rescued. She was on a voyage from Newport, Monmouthshire to Wexford.
Erin's Pride	United Kingdom	The schooner was driven ashore at Dundrum, County Down. Her crew reached shore in the lifeboat. She was on a voyage from Whitehaven, Cumberland to Dundrum.
Excel	United Kingdom	The schooner was driven ashore at Swansea, Glamorgan. She was on a voyage from Swansea to New Ross, County Wexford. She was refloated the next day and towed in to Swansea.
Hopewell	United Kingdom	The ketch was driven ashore at Southwick, Sussex. Her crew were rescued by the Coastguard.
Industry	United Kingdom	The smack foundered in the North Sea off Ingoldmells, Lincolnshire. Her crew were rescued. She was on a voyage from Goole, Yorkshire to Thornham, Norfolk.
Iris	United Kingdom	The steamship was wrecked on Inishtrahull, County Donegal with the loss of one life. She was on a voyage from Greenock, Renfrewshire to Sligo.
Kathinka	Germany	The barque was abandoned in the Atlantic Ocean. Her crew were rescued by the steamship Lady Clive (United Kingdom). Kathinka was on a voyage from Hamburg to Port Royal, Jamaica.
Maid of Irvine	United Kingdom	The ship was driven ashore at the mouth of the River Bann. She was on a voyage from Glasgow, Renfrewshire to Coleraine, County Antrim.
Minnie Flossie	United Kingdom	The ketch was abandoned off Clovelly, Devon. Her three crew were rescued by the Clovelly Lifeboat Graham Hughes ( Royal National Lifeboat Institution).
R. and M. J. Charnley	United Kingdom	The schooner was driven ashore at Kilcredane, County Kerry.
Roma	Norway	The barque ran aground and capsized on the Gunfleet Sand, in the North Sea off the coast of Essex, United Kingdom. All fourteen people on board were rescued by the Harwich Lifeboat Albert Edward ( Royal National Lifeboat Institution).
Tranmere	United Kingdom	The barque was driven ashore at Selsey, Sussex. Her crew were rescued by the Selsey Lifeboat. She was on a voyage from Hull, Yorkshire to Cardiff, Glamorgan. She was refloated and towed in to Portsmouth, Hampshire on 5 September by the tugs Ranger and Victoria (both United Kingdom)
Victoria	United Kingdom	The ship was driven ashore at Port Gaverne, Cornwall. She was on a voyage from Newport, Monmouthshire to Port Isaac, Cornwall.
William and Mary	(United Kingdom of Great Britain and Ireland) Guernsey	The brigantine sprang a leak and sank in The Downs. Her crew were rescued. She was on a voyage from Guernsey to London.

== 3 September ==
List of shipwrecks: 3 September 1883
Ship	State	Description
Anne Catherine	Denmark	The ship foundered in the North Sea 50 to 60 nautical miles (93 to 111 km) east of Lowestoft, Suffolk, United Kingdom, Her five crew were rescued by the smack England's Rose (United Kingdom). Anne Catherine was on a voyage from Bremen, Germany to London, United Kingdom.
Brage	Norway	The barque was abandoned at sea. Her crew were rescued by County of Bute (United Kingdom).
Britannia	United Kingdom	The barque was wrecked on Cape Sable Island, Nova Scotia, Canada with the loss of thirteen of the seventeen people on board. She was on a voyage from Morant Bay, Jamaica to Montreal, Quebec, Canada.
Coldra	United Kingdom	The steamship was wrecked at Pasaia, Spain with some loss of life.
Cromarty	United Kingdom	The brigantine was abandoned in the Atlantic Ocean (46°38′N 17°20′W). Her crew were rescued by the steamship Romano (United Kingdom) and she was set afire. Cromarty was on a voyage from "Lugo, Mexico" to Liverpool, Lancashire.
Edward and Mary	United Kingdom	The smack was driven ashore and wrecked at Bridport, Dorset. Her crew were rescued.
Ernst	Sweden	The ship departed from Doboy, Georgia, United States for Morlaix, Finistère France. No further trace,. reported missing.
Free Lance	United Kingdom	The yacht was driven ashore and wrecked in Robin Hoods Bay. Her crew were ashore at the time.
Marie	France	The schooner ran aground on the Doom Bar and was wrecked. Her crew survived. She was on a voyage from Swansea, Glamorgan, United Kingdom to Regnéville-sur-Mer, Manche.
Phœnix	Germany	The steamship foundered in the Atlantic Ocean (48°35′N 6°52′W) with the loss of a crew member. Survivors were rescued by the schooner Papa Felice (Italy). Phœnix was on a voyage from Cardiff, Glamorgan to Odesa, Russia.
Union	United Kingdom	The smack was driven ashore and wrecked at Bridport. Her crew were rescued.
Walton	United Kingdom	The ship was wrecked at Bayonne, Basses-Pyrénées, France.
Zoe	United Kingdom	The brigantine was driven ashore on Seskar, Russia. She was on a voyage from Málaga, Spain to Saint Petersburg, Russia. She was refloated with the assistance of a steamship and found to be leaky

== 4 September ==
List of shipwrecks: 4 September 1883
Ship	State	Description
Clara	United Kingdom	The cutter yacht collided with the Norfolk wherry Zephyr (United Kingdom) and sank near Somerleyton, Suffolk.
Lizzie	Norway	The barque collided with a derelict vessel in the Atlantic Ocean and became leaky. She was abandoned on 7 September. Her nine crew were rescued by the barque Boyesen (Norway) before she sank. Lizzie was on a voyage from Glasgow, Renfrewshire, United Kingdom to Shediac, New Brunswick, Canada.
Wild Gazelle	United States	The fishing schooner was wrecked on a reef near Korovin Island, Department of Alaska. All on board survived. She was on a voyage from San Francisco, California to the Shumagin Islands, Department of Alaska.

== 5 September ==
List of shipwrecks: 5 September 1883
Ship	State	Description
Benledi	Canada	The schooner was driven ashore and wrecked on Dominica in a hurricane.
Live Oak	United Kingdom	The barquentine was driven ashore near Irvine, Ayrshire. She was refloated and towed in to Troon, Ayrshire in a leaky condition.

== 6 September ==
List of shipwrecks: 6 September 1883
Ship	State	Description
Canima	Canada	The steamship was wrecked on Gull Island, New York and sank. All 60 people on board were rescued. She was on a voyage from New York City to Halifax, Nova Scotia.
Unnamed	Flag unknown	A yacht foundered in the English Channel off Dungeness, Kent, United Kingdom. All on board were rescued.

== 7 September ==
List of shipwrecks: 7 September 1883
Ship	State	Description
Gna	Norway	The barque collided with the full-rigged ship Euphrates (United Kingdom) and was severely damaged. Gna was on a voyage from Skutskär, Sweden to Palma de Mallorca, Spain. She put in to Plymouth, Devon, United Kingdom in a sinking condition.
Windermere	United Kingdom	The barque went ashore and was wrecked at Fort Ross, California, United States, due to negligence in navigation. She was on a voyage from Newcastle, New South Wales for San Francisco, with coal; all crew were rescued.

== 8 September ==
List of shipwrecks: 8 September 1883
Ship	State	Description
Scottish Chieftain	United Kingdom	The ship was wrecked in the Andaman Islands. Her crew were rescued by Maharani (India). Scottish Chieftain was on a voyage from Calcutta, India to London.
Sussex	United Kingdom	The steamship was driven ashore at Fort Perle. She was on a voyage from Antwerp, Belgium to Montreal, Quebec, Canada. She was later refloated and taken in to Montreal, where she arrived on 23 September.
Thalia	United Kingdom	The brig was driven ashore at Thisted, Denmark. She was a total loss.
Wansfell	United Kingdom	The steamship ran aground at Irvine, Ayrshire.

== 9 September ==
List of shipwrecks: 9 September 1883
Ship	State	Description
Abeona	United Kingdom	The steamship was run down and sunk off Lowestoft, Suffolk by Beryl (United Kingdom). Her crew were rescued by Beryl. Abeona was on a voyage from London to Sunderland, County Durham.

== 10 September ==
List of shipwrecks: 10 September 1883
Ship	State	Description
Eskandi	Italy	The steamship ran ashore on Skantzoura, Greece.

== 11 September ==
List of shipwrecks: 11 September 1883
Ship	State	Description
Ernest	United States	The brigantine was driven ashore at "Stamaraca", Brazil. She was on a voyage from New York to Pernambuco, Brazil.

== 12 September ==
List of shipwrecks: 12 September 1883
Ship	State	Description
Brittany	United Kingdom	The steamship struck a rock and sank at Bilbao, Spain.
Fratelli Gaggino	Italy	The barque collided with a steamship and sank off The Needles, Isle of Wight, United Kingdom of Great Britain and Ireland. All on board took to the boats; they were rescued by the steamship Habsburg (Germany). Fratelli Gaggino was on a voyage from Dunkirk, Nord, France to Cardiff, Glamorgan, United Kingdom.

== 13 September ==
List of shipwrecks: 13 September 1883
Ship	State	Description
Celebrity	United Kingdom	The brig ran aground on the Haisborough Sands, in the North Sea off the coast of Norfolk. She was on a voyage from London to South Shields, County Durham. She was refloated with assistance and taken in to Great Yarmouth, Norfolk.
Independente	Italy	The steamship was wrecked on the coast of Long Island, New York, United States. Her crew were rescued. She was on a voyage from Palermo, Sicily to New York City, United States.
Providence	United Kingdom	The ship ran aground on Huntley Foot, in the North Sea. She was on a voyage from Littlehampton, Sussex to Sunderland, County Durham. She was refloated and assisted in to Yorkshire in a severely leaky condition.

== 14 September ==
List of shipwrecks: 14 September 1883
Ship	State	Description
Hardwick	United Kingdom	The steamship collided with the steamship Crœsus (United Kingdom) and was beached north of Scarborough, Yorkshire. Hardwick was on a voyage from London to Hartlepool, County Durham. She was refloated and taken in to Scarborough in a waterlogged condition.
Monaco	United Kingdom	The steamship collided with the steamship John M'Intyre (United Kingdom) and sank off Seaham, County Durham. Her crew were rescued by John M'Intyre.

== 15 September ==
List of shipwrecks: 15 September 1883
Ship	State	Description
Salto	Denmark	The schooner was run down and sunk in the North Sea off the Varne Lightvessel ( Trinity House) by the steamship Bedford (United Kingdom). One of her six crew was reported missing, the rest were rescued by Bedford. Salto was on a voyage from Honfleur, Manche, France to Nakskov.

== 16 September ==
List of shipwrecks: 16 September 1883
Ship	State	Description
Augusta	Norway	The barque sprang a leak and sank in the North Sea 5 nautical miles (9.3 km) east of Inchcape, Fife, United Kingdom. Her crew survived. She was on a voyage from Bo'ness, Lothian, United Kingdom to Kristiansand.
Miliana Ana	France	The schooner was wrecked on the north coast of Minorca, Spain with the loss of her captain. She was on a voyage from Algiers, Algeria to Cannes, Alpes-Maritimes.
Noord-Holland	Netherlands	The steamship ran aground on the Goodwin Sands, Kent, United Kingdom. She was on a voyage from Rotterdam, South Holland to Southampton, Hampshire, United Kingdom. She was refloated and taken in to London, United Kingdom for repairs.
Zembra	United Kingdom	The steamship was driven ashore and wrecked at Lagos, Portugal. She was on a voyage from the Newfoundland Colony to Livorno, Italy.

== 18 September ==
List of shipwrecks: 18 September 1883
Ship	State	Description
Zembra	United Kingdom	The steamship ran aground and san at Cape St. Vincent, Portugal. Her crew were rescued by the gunboat Tego (Imperial Japanese Navy). Zembra was on a voyage from the Salmon River, Labrador, Newfoundland Colony to Livorno, Italy.
Fifty unnamed vessels	Flags unknown	The ships, mostly American brigs and schooners, were wrecked in a hurricane at Nassau, Bahamas.

== 19 September ==
List of shipwrecks: 19 September 1883
Ship	State	Description
Oxford	United Kingdom	The barque was damaged by fire at Havre de Grâce, Seine-Inférieure, France. A crew member was killed and many were seriously injured. She was declared a total loss.
St. Leonards	United Kingdom	The steamship collided with the steamship Cormorant (United Kingdom) and sank 18 nautical miles (33 km) south-east of Start Point, Devon. All 60 people on board survived. St. Leonards was bound for New Zealand.

== 20 September ==
List of shipwrecks: 20 September 1883
Ship	State	Description
Emily and Ann	United Kingdom	The Humber Keel foundered off "Skitter", Lincolnshire.
Taitsing	United Kingdom	The clipper ship sank in the Indian Ocean off Nyuni Island, Zanzibar. She was on a voyage from Swansea, Glamorgan to Zanzibar.

== 22 September ==
List of shipwrecks: 22 September 1883
Ship	State	Description
Carmona	United Kingdom	The steamship ran aground at Cardiff, Glamorgan. She was on a voyage from London to Cardiff. She was refloated with the assistance of three tugs and taken in to Cardiff but ran into the quayside and was further damaged.
Emily	United Kingdom	The steamship ran aground on the North Rock, off the coast of County Antrim. She was on a voyage from Bilbao, Spain to Greenock, Renfrewshire. She was refloated on 5 October and towed in to Belfast, County Antrim.
Elsina	Germany	The galiot was driven ashore at Reval, Russia.
Hannah Solmer	Norway	The barque was wrecked at Riga, Russia. She was on a voyage from Havre de Grâce, Seine-Inférieure, France to Riga.
Louisa	United States	The whaler, a barque, struck ice off Point Hope, Department of Alaska. She sank in the Chukchi Sea off Herald Island, Russia.
Snaresbrook	United Kingdom	The steamship ran aground in the Dardanelles at "Bulgar Deressi", Ottoman Empire. She was on a voyage from Malta to Constantinople, Ottoman Empire. She was refloated the next day with assistance.

== 23 September ==
List of shipwrecks: 23 September 1883
Ship	State	Description
Decatur H. Miller	United States	The steamship was driven ashore in Vineyard Sound. She was refloated with the assistance of the survey ship USC&GS Blake ( United States Coast and Geodetic Survey), the revenue cutter USRC Dexter ( United States Revenue-Marine), and the fisheries science research ship and floating fish hatchery USFC Fish Hawk ( United States Commission of Fish and Fisheries).

== 24 September ==
List of shipwrecks: 24 September 1883
Ship	State	Description
Ashton, and Delos	United Kingdom; Flag unknown	The steamship Ashton collided with Delos. Both vessels were beached at Scutari, Ottoman Empire.
Celeste	France	The lugger foundered 3 nautical miles (5.6 km) north west of Skomer, Pembrokeshire, United Kingdom. Her crew were rescued. She was on a voyage from Pembrey, Carmarthenshire, United Kingdom to Isigny-sur-Mer, Clavados.
Coquet	United Kingdom	The steamship sank at Bilbao, Spain. She was later refloated.
Martha Jackson	United Kingdom	The barque was driven ashore at Dungeness, Kent. Her crew were rescued by rocket apparatus. She was on a voyage from Iquique, Chile to Hamburg, Germany. She was refloated on 28 September.

== 25 September ==
List of shipwrecks: 25 September 1883
Ship	State	Description
Madura	Germany	The barque sprang a leak and foundered in the Atlantic Ocean. Her crew were rescued by the barque Atalanta (Denmark). Madura was on a voyage from Dieppe, Seine-Inférieure, France to Philadelphia, Pennsylvania, United States.
Petit Corporal	France	The ship was driven ashore at "Svenska Hogarne", Sweden.

== 26 September ==
List of shipwrecks: 26 September 1883
Ship	State	Description
Barrington	United Kingdom	The steamship was driven ashore and wrecked at Maryport, Cumberland. Her crew were rescued by the Maryport Lifeboat. She was on a voyage from Weston-super-Mare, Somerset to Workington, Cumberland.
Cyrus	United Kingdom	The schooner was beached at Angle, Pembrokeshire.
Ennismore	United Kingdom	The steamship ran aground on the Annat Bank, at the mouth of the River Tay. Her crew were rescued by the lifeboat Mincing Lane ( Royal National Lifeboat Institution). Ennismore was on a voyage from Peterhead, Aberdeenshire to Amble, Northumberland. She was refloated and taken in to a port.
Rotterdam	Netherlands	The passenger ship ran aground on the Zeehonderbank, in the North Sea off Schouwen, Zeeland. Her 65 passengers were taken off by the lifeboat Zierikzee (Netherlands). Her crew were subsequently taken off by the tug Nieuwesluis (Netherlands). Rotterdam was on a voyage from New York, United States to Rotterdam, South Holland. She broke in two on 12 October and was a total loss.
Susannah	United Kingdom	The 54.5-foot (16.6 m) fishing smack was sunk in a gale in the area of Maryport.
Vivid	United Kingdom	The fishing smack was sunk in a gale in the area of Maryport.

== 27 September ==
List of shipwrecks: 27 September 1883
Ship	State	Description
Adelaide	United Kingdom	The steamship ran aground on the Peil Bank, in the Irish Sea. She was on a voyage from Liverpool, Lancashire to Belfast, County Antrim.
Bavington	United Kingdom	The steamship was driven ashore and wrecked at Maryport, Cumberland. Her crew were rescued by the Maryport Lifeboat.
Star	United Kingdom	The ship was driven ashore at Whitehaven, Cumberland. Her crew were rescued.
Thornton	United Kingdom	The schooner was driven ashore and wrecked at "Barnard", Lancashire. Her crew were rescued.

== 28 September ==
List of shipwrecks: 28 September 1883
Ship	State	Description
Ann	United Kingdom	The coble collided with the yawl Water Lily ( (United Kingdom of Great Britain and Ireland) Isle of Man) and sank in the North Sea 4 nautical miles (7.4 km) off Whitby, Yorkshire. Her crew survived.

== 29 September ==
List of shipwrecks: 29 September 1883
Ship	State	Description
Clipper	United Kingdom	The fishing smack departed from Ipswich, Suffolk for the North Sea. No further trace, presumed foundered with the loss of all ten crew.

== Unknown date ==
List of shipwrecks: Unknown date in September 1883
Ship	State	Description
Acadian	United Kingdom	The ship was wrecked at Valparaíso, Chile. Her crew were rescued.
Activ	Denmark	The schooner was wrecked at Orebak, Iceland.
Ada	United Kingdom	The ketch ran aground on the Longnose Rock, Margate, Kent. She was refloated on 26 September.
Æolus	United Kingdom	The schooner was abandoned in the English Channel between The Needles, Isle of Wight and the Old Harry Rocks, Dorset. Her crew survived. She was on a voyage from London to Tralee, County Kerry.
Alma	(France) Martinique	The drogher was driven ashore on Martinique.
Amanda	(Dominion of Newfoundland) Newfoundland Colony	The ship was wrecked at Viana do Castelo, Portugal. Her crew were rescued.
Anna Louise	Denmark	The schooner was wrecked at Orebak.
Annie	United Kingdom	The steamship ran aground near Belfast, County Antrim. She was on a voyage from Belfast to Workington, Cumberland.
Annie Maude	United Kingdom	The ship was driven ashore on Anticosti Island, Nova Scotia, Canada. She was on a voyage from Montreal, Quebec, Canada to Buenos Aires, Argentina.
Avoca	United Kingdom	The steamship ran aground in the Maas 8 nautical miles (15 km) from Rotterdam, South Holland, Netherlands. She was refloated and taken in to Rotterdam.
Bayadere	France	The barque was driven ashore at Saint-Pierre, Martinique. She was a total loss.
Bella Ross	United Kingdom	The schooner was abandoned in the Atlantic Ocean on or before 2 September. She was on a voyage from Liverpool, Lancashire to Saint John's, Newfoundland Colony.
Bradford City	United Kingdom	The steamship was wrecked near Lockport, Nova Scotia. Her crew were rescued.
Brilliant	(France) Martinique	The drogher was driven ashore on Martinique.
C. D. Bryant	United States	The ship was driven ashore at the mouth of the Columbia River.
Charles H. Hildrith	United States	The schooner departed from Gloucester, Massachusetts for the Georges Bank. No further trace, presumed foundered with the loss of all eight crew.
China	Norway	The ship was driven ashore and wrecked on Walney Island, Lancashire. Her crew were rescued by the Barrow-in-Furness Lifeboat. She was on a voyage from Halifax, Nova Scotia to Liverpool.
Clementine	(France) Martinique	The drogher was driven ashore on Martinique.
Clio	United Kingdom	The brig was driven ashore and wrecked at Saint-Pierre, Martinique. Her crew were rescued.
Columbia	United States	The steamship collided with the barque Aberlemno (United Kingdom) in the Columbia River and was severely damaged.
Cousins Arbib	United Kingdom	The steamship ran aground near Bristol, Gloucestershire. She was on a voyage from Kurrachee, India to Bristol.
Deronda	United Kingdom	The steamship ran aground at "Flintredden" and sprang a leak.
Edward William	United Kingdom	The steamship ran aground on Saltholm, Denmark. She was on a voyage from Kronstadt, Russia to London.
Elizabeth	United Kingdom	The smack was driven ashore at Malin, County Donegal. She was on a voyage from Belfast to Glasgow, Renfrewshire.
Ferncliffe	United Kingdom	The ship ran aground at Pembrey, Carmarthenshire. She was refloated on 7 September.
Ferncliffe	United Kingdom	The steamship collided with a barque in the English Channel 19 nautical miles (35 km) north west of St. Catherine's Point, Isle of Wight. She sank off Christchurch, Hampshire. Her crew survived.
Fria	Norway	The barque was driven ashore. She was on a voyage from Härnösand, Sweden to Marseille, Bouches-du-Rhône, France. She was refloated and taken in to Helsingør, Denmark.
Georges Henri	France	The ketch was driven ashore in Ladder Chine, Isle of Wight, United Kingdom. Her crew were rescued.
Gorlitza	Imperial Russian Navy	The torpedo boat sank near "Borkce".
Gustave et Paul	(France) Martinique	The drogher was driven ashore on Martinique.
Hadassah	(Denmark) Danish West Indies	The sloop was driven ashore and wrecked on Martinique.
Haddington	United Kingdom	The ship was driven ashore at Culpee, India. She was later refloated.
Hyacinthe	United Kingdom	The dandy was abandoned in the Atlantic Ocean before 19 September.
Isabella Brammen	Netherlands	The barque was driven ashore at Bexhill-on-Sea, Sussex, United Kingdom.
J. Sergeant	United States	The barque was abandoned at sea before 11 September. Her crew were rescued. She was on a voyage from New York to Valparaíso.
Jeune Louise	(France) Martinique	The drogher was driven ashore on Martinique.
Julio	(France) Martinique	The drogher was driven ashore on Martinique.
Kate	(United Kingdom of Great Britain and Ireland) Jersey	The cutter was wrecked near Morlaix, Finistère, France.
Koriuschka	Imperial Russian Navy	The torpedo boat sank near "Borkce".
Lemnos	France	The barque was driven ashore at Saint-Pierre, Martinique. She was a total loss.
Lilian	(United Kingdom of Great Britain and Ireland) Guernsey	The schooner was wrecked near Penmarc'h, Finistère.
Limerick	United Kingdom	The steamship was driven ashore at Eggegrund, Sweden. She was on a voyage from Stockholm to "Giell".
Ludwig	Belgium	The steamship foundered near Indian Harbour, Nova Scotia with the loss of all 32 passengers and 43 crew. She was on a voyage from Antwerp to Montreal.
Maggie	United Kingdom	The ship was wrecked at Cape Race, Newfoundland Colony. She was on a voyage from New Richmond, Quebec to Llanelly, Glamorgan.
Maria	Germany	The schooner was driven ashore at Kalmar, Sweden. She was on a voyage from Bremen to Oskarshamn, Sweden.
Marinetta	United Kingdom	The yawl was wrecked at Torquay, Devon.
Martha	France	The schooner was driven ashore on Martinique. She was a total loss.
Mary Ann	(France) Martinique	The drogher was driven ashore on Martinique.
Mary Rosanna	United Kingdom	The ship was driven ashore "in Kirkhope". She was on a voyage from "Morrishaven" to Wick, Caithness.
Midlothian	United Kingdom	The steamship ran aground on the Lillegrund, in the Baltic Sea. She was on a voyage from Kronstadt to London.
Millo	United Kingdom	The ship ran aground on the Gore Sand, in the Bristol Channel off Bridgwater, Somerset.
Mioti	France	The barque was driven ashore at Saint-Pierre, Martinique.
Mistletoe	United Kingdom	The brigantine foundered before 13 September. Her five crew were rescued by the barque Magnolia (United Kingdom).
Mysore	France	The barque was driven ashore and wrecked at Saint-Pierre, Martinique.
Mystery	United Kingdom	The tug sank in the River Wear. She was refloated on 2 October.
Oisseau	(France) Martinique	The drogher was driven ashore on Martinique.
Orla	Spain	The brig was driven ashore and wrecked on the Isla de Mona, Puerto Rico. Her crew were rescued. She was on a voyage from Ponce to Magaguëz.
P. A. J.	France	The barque was driven ashore on Martinique.
Pauline	France	The brig ran aground and was wrecked.
Pearle	(France) Martinique	The steamship was driven ashore on Martinique. She was a total loss.
Pensee-Ayugrey	Flag unknown	A ship's boat with the name Pensee-Ayugrey was found at St Ives, Cornwall, United Kingdom on 1 October and wreckage was washed ashore. A body of a man was found at Hawke's Point.
Perthshire	United Kingdom	The sailing ship departed from Middlesbrough, North Riding of Yorkshire for Buenos Ayres, Argentina. No further trace, reported missing.
Potaro	United Kingdom	The steamship ran aground in the Berlengas, Portugal. She was on a voyage from Taganrog, Russia to Amsterdam, North Holland, Netherlands. She was refloated and put in to Lisbon, Portugal.
Queen of the Pacific	United States	The steamship was driven ashore at the mouth of the Columbia River.
Restless	Canada	The fishing schooner was wrecked on the coast of Nova Scotia with the loss of all nine hands. She was towed in to Barrington, Nova Scotia in a waterlogged condition.
Roberts	United Kingdom	The ship was driven ashore at Islandmagee, County Antrim. She was on a voyage from Irvine, Ayrshire to Newry, County Antrim.
Rosina	Germany	The barque ran aground in the Bute Channel. She was on a voyage from Cardiff, Glamorgan to Singapore, Straits Settlements.
Ruby	{Flag unknown	The sloop was driven ashore and wrecked on Antigua. Her crew were rescued.
Samuel Skolfield	United States	The full-rigged ship was abandoned in the Atlantic Ocean with some loss of life. She was on a voyage from Calcutta, India to New York.
Sarah E. Kennedy	United States	The ship was driven ashore at Cardiff. She was on a voyage from A Coruña, Spain to Cardiff. She was refloated on 27 September.
Sayn	Germany	The steamship was driven ashore on "Wrangelsholm", in the Baltic Sea. She was on a voyage from Rotterdam to Kronstadt, Russia.
Siddartha	United Kingdom	The barque was driven ashore at Cape Enrage, New Brunswick, Canada. She was on a voyage from Liverpool to Sackville, New Brunswick.
Sirena	Italy	The barque ran aground at Bilbao, Spain. She was on a voyage from New York to Bilbao. She was later refloated and taken in to Bilbao.
Skjerkholt	Norway	The barque was driven ashore on Terschelling, Friesland, Netherlands. Her crew were rescued. She was on a voyage from Pensacola, Florida, United States to Harlingen, Friesland.
Sokoto	Canada	The ship was driven ashore. She was refloated and put back to Singapore in a leaky condition.
Sorrento	Flag unknown	The ship was driven ashore in the Strait of Magellan. She was later refloated and taken in to Punta Arenas, Chile.
St. Josephs	(France) Martinique	The drogher was driven ashore on Martinique.
Tapaguer	France	The barque was driven ashore at Saint-Pierre, Martinique. She was a total loss.
Telis	(France) Martinique	The drogher was driven ashore on Martinique.
Teviot	United Kingdom	The brig was abandoned in the Atlantic Ocean. Her nine crew were rescued by the steamship Château Lafitte (France.
Thessalos	Greece	The brig was abandoned at sea. Her crew were rescued by the steamship Strathallan (United Kingdom). Thessalos was on a voyage from Taganrog, Russia to a British port. She was later towed in to Viveiro, Spain by the steamship Ixia (Spain).
Torch	United Kingdom	The cutter yacht foundered in the North Sea with the loss of all four people on board. She was on a voyage from Clacton-on-Sea, Essex to the River Thames.
Ulrika	Sweden	The barque ran aground at "Svenska Stenarne". She was on a voyage from Ljusne to Hartlepool, County Durham, United Kingdom. She was refloated and towed in to Stockholm in a waterlogged condition.
Una	United Kingdom	The Thames barge was driven ashore at Vlissingen, Zeeland, Netherlands. She was on a voyage from London to Leerdam, Utrecht, Netherlands.
Victoria	United Kingdom	The steamship ran aground at Boston, Massachusetts, United States.
Vigo	United Kingdom	The brig was driven ashore at Rattray Head, Aberdeenshire. Her crew were rescued. she was on a voyage from a Swedish port to Lossiemouth, Moray.
Viking	United Kingdom	The steamship was driven ashore at Couth Point, Anticosti Island. She was on a voyage from Montreal, Quebec to London.
Virginia	United Kingdom	The ship was driven ashore and wrecked in the Magdalen Islands, Nova Scotia. She was on a voyage from Greenock, Renfrewshire to Quebec City. Canada.
Thirteen unnamed vessels	United States	The ships were driven ashore and wrecked near Smithville, North Carolina before 13 September.
Four unnamed vessels	Flags unknown	The fishing vessels were lost off the coast of Nova Scotia before 13 September with the loss of fourteen lives.
Five unnamed vessels	Flags unknown	The ships were lost at Saint John's, Newfoundland Colony before 13 September with the loss of seventeen lives.
Twelve unnamed vesseks	Flags unknown	The ships were driven ashore on Martinique.
Ten unnamed vessels	Flags unknown	The coasters were driven ashore and wrecked on Antigua with the loss of three lives.
