= New Chine =

Chine on the Isle of Wight

New Chine on the Isle of Wight

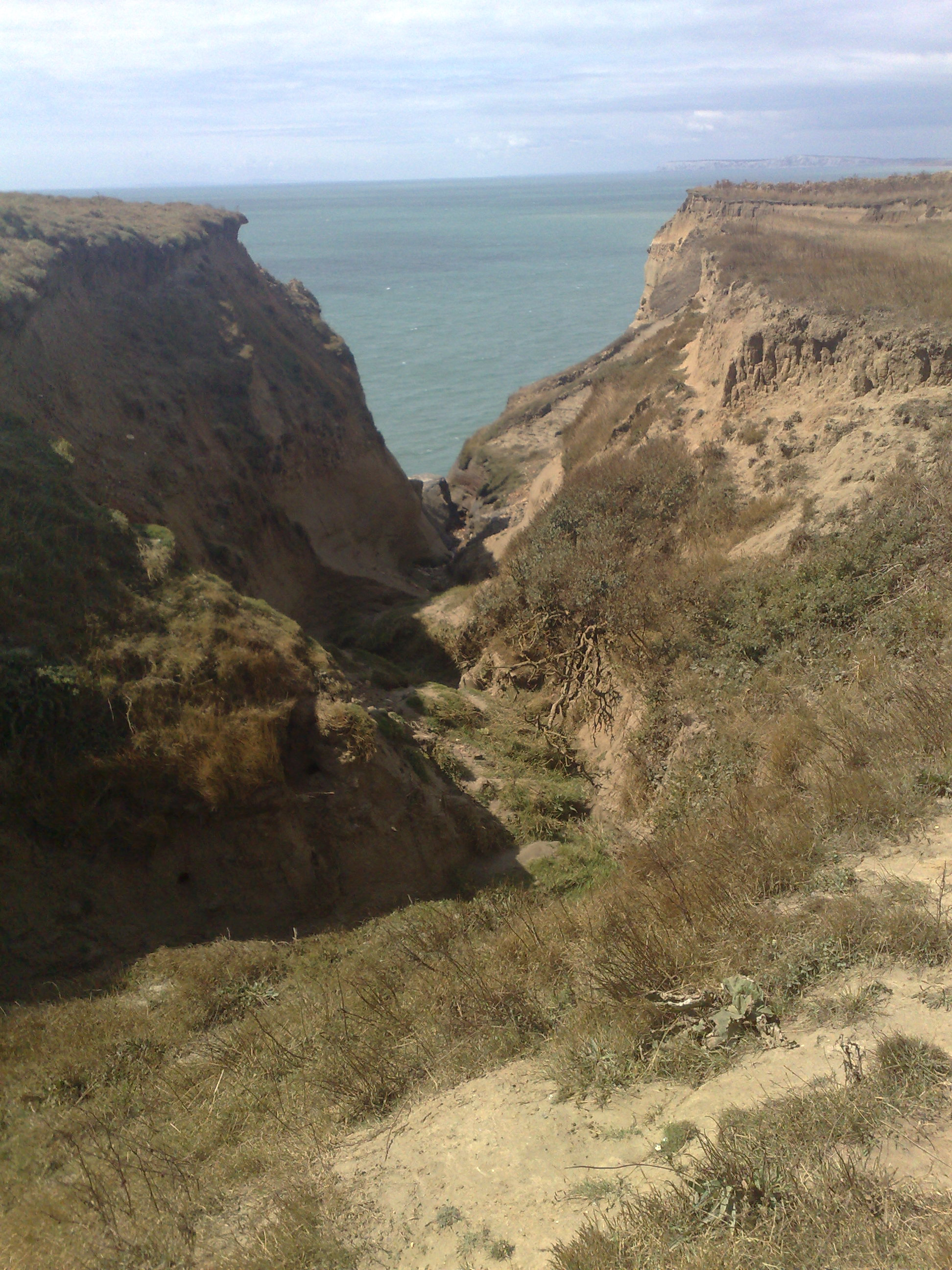
New Chine

New Chine is a geological feature on the south west coast of the Isle of Wight, England (the Back of the Wight). It is west of the village of Chale. It is a sandy coastal ravine, one of a number of such chines on the island created by stream erosion of soft Cretaceous rocks. It leads from the 190 foot high clifftop to a knickpoint approximately one third of way down the cliff face above Chale Bay beach.

The Chine is one of three chines that have been eroded by a small unnamed brook that descends from Chale that drains rainwater from the west side of St. Catherine's Hill. The other two chines are Ladder Chine and Walpen Chine. The brook initially wound its way to the cliff face and its descent over the edge created Ladder chine. As the cliff eroded, the brook found a shorter path to the sea and started creating Walpen Chine to the east of Ladder chine. As the cliff eroded further, the brook moved east again and is currently eroding an unnamed chine labelled New Chine.

New Chine consists of two small narrow ravines that feed the same knickpoint. The main ravine has the brook running through it for all but the driest parts of the summer. The smaller more westerly ravine is eroded when the brook overflows during flash flooding and the excess water finds a second route to the cliff edge.

The Isle of Wight Coastal Path runs alongside the top of the chine and part of the brook.
