= Walpen Chine =

Chine on the Isle of Wight

Walpen Chine on the Isle of Wight

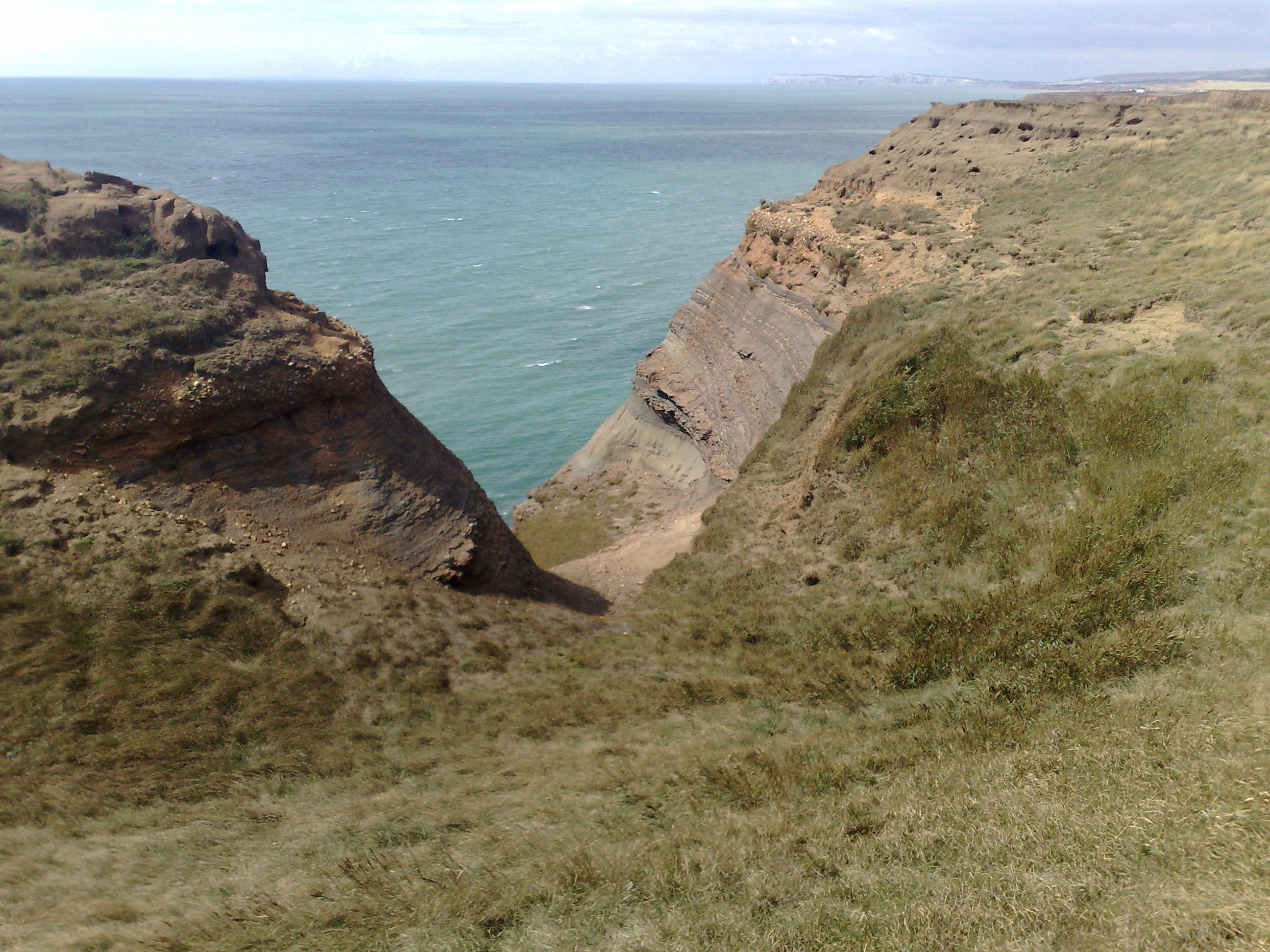
Walpen Chine

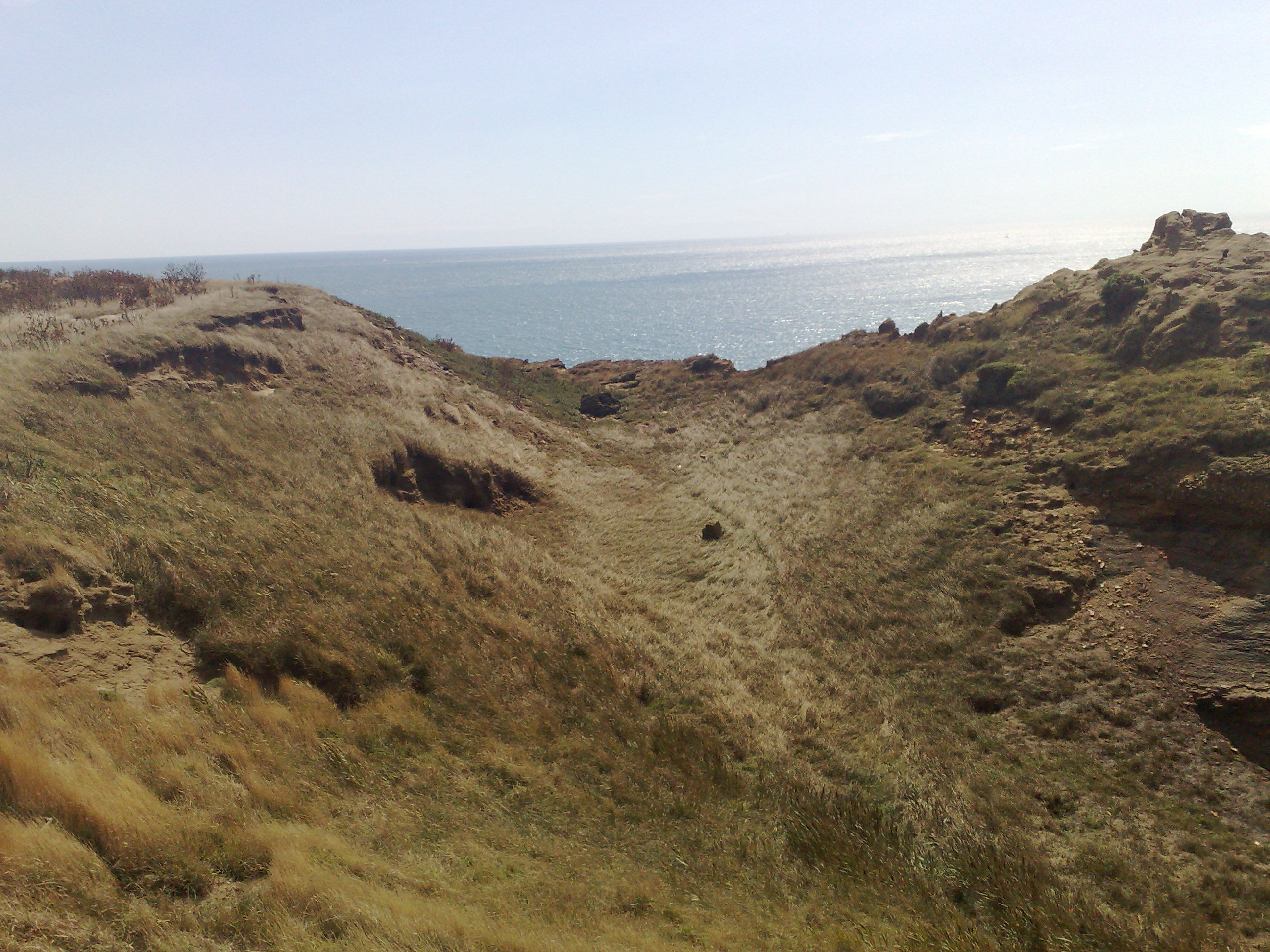
The dry river bed that used to feed water into Walpen Chine

Walpen Chine (also called Walpan Chine or Old Walpen Chine) is a geological feature on the south west coast of the Isle of Wight, England. It is west of the village of Chale. It is a sandy coastal ravine, one of a number of such chines on the island created by stream erosion of soft Cretaceous rocks. It leads from the 190 feet high clifftop next to the Isle of Wight coastal path to a knickpoint approximately halfway down the cliff face above Chale Bay beach.

== Name ==
The name is probably from Old English walu (ridge, embankment) and penn (a pen or fold for animals). The first element is not completely confirmed, but it is likely.

1086: Valpenne

12th century: Walepen

~1240: Walepanne

1302: Walpanne

1428: Walpan

== Source ==
The chine is one of three that have been eroded by a small unnamed brook that descends from Chale that drains rainwater from the west side of St. Catherine's Hill. The other two chines are Ladder Chine and New Chine. The brook initially wound its way to the cliff face and its descent over the edge created Ladder Chine. As the cliff eroded, the brook found a shorter path to the sea and started creating Walpen Chine to the east of Ladder chine. As the cliff eroded further, the brook moved east again and is currently eroding New Chine.

Ladder and Walpen Chines are both now dry and in Walpen Chine the river bed can be seen heading back uphill to the cliff edge.
