= Stream power law =

The term stream power law describes a semi-empirical family of equations used to predict the rate of erosion of a river into its bed. These combine equations describing conservation of water mass and momentum in streams with relations for channel hydraulic geometry (width-discharge scaling) and basin hydrology (discharge-area scaling) and an assumed dependency of erosion rate on either unit stream power or shear stress on the bed to produce a simplified description of erosion rate as a function of power laws of upstream drainage area, A, and channel slope, S:

$$E = K A^m S^n$$

where E is erosion rate and K, m and n are positive. The value of these parameters depends on the assumptions made, but all forms of the law can be expressed in this basic form.

The parameters K, m and n are not necessarily constant, but rather may vary as functions of the assumed scaling laws, erosion process, bedrock erodibility, climate, sediment flux, and/or erosion threshold. However, observations of the hydraulic scaling of real rivers believed to be in erosional steady state indicate that the ratio m/n should be around 0.5, which provides a basic test of the applicability of each formulation.

Although consisting of the product of two power laws, the term stream power law refers to the derivation of the early forms of the equation from assumptions of erosion dependency on stream power, rather than to the presence of power laws in the equation. This relation is not a true scientific law, but rather a heuristic description of erosion processes based on previously observed scaling relations which may or may not be applicable in any given natural setting.

The stream power law is an example of a one dimensional advection equation, more specifically a hyperbolic partial differential equation. Typically, the equation is used to simulate propagating incision pulses creating discontinuities or knickpoints in the river profile. Commonly used first order finite difference methods to solve the stream power law may result in significant numerical diffusion which can be prevented by the use of analytical solutions or higher order numerical schemes.
