= Stream head cut =

Feature of a stream bed

In geomorphology, a stream head cut or simply head cut (alternately headcut) is an erosional feature of some intermittent and perennial streams. Headcuts and headward erosion are hallmarks of unstable expanding drainage features such as actively eroding gullies. Headcuts are a type of knickpoint that, as the name indicates, occur at the head (upstream extent) of a channel.

The knickpoint, where a head cut begins, can be as small as an overly-steep riffle zone or as a large as a waterfall. When it is not flowing, the head cut will resemble a very short cliff or bluff. A small plunge pool may be present at the base of the head cut due to the high energy of falling water. As erosion of the knickpoint and the streambed continues, the head cut will migrate upstream.

Groundwater seeps and springs are sometimes found along the face, sides, or base of a head cut.

Channel incision is very common when head cuts are involved in stream morphology. In terms of stream restoration, head cuts are one of the most difficult challenges. Installing check dams or elevating the stream by filling the gully are common ways to mitigate up stream migration of the knickpoint. Another common way to control the knickpoint is by sloping the bank face by laying down fabric and rock.
