= Ladder Chine =

Chine on the Isle of Wight

Ladder Chine on the Isle of Wight

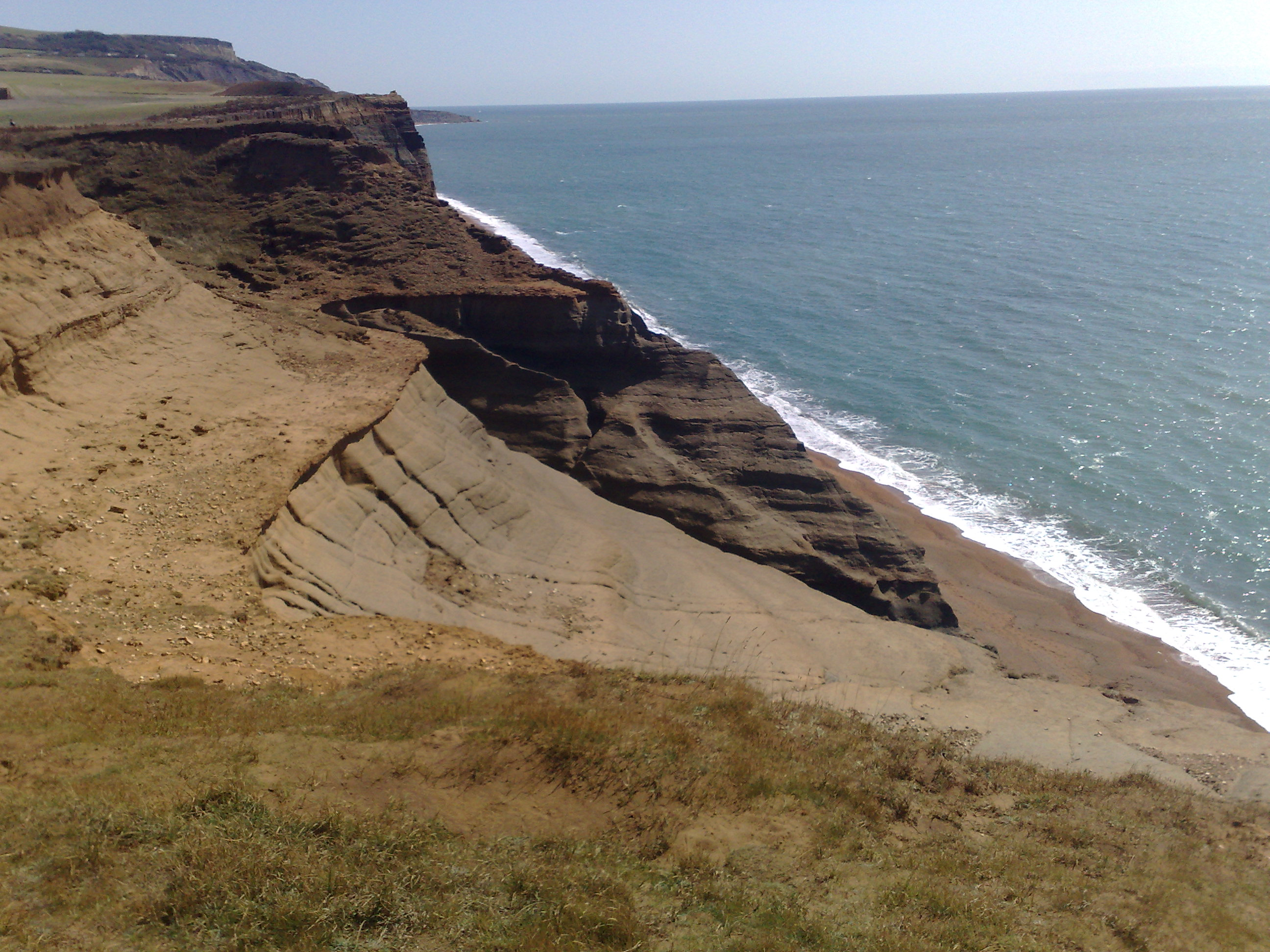
Ladder Chine

Ladder Chine is a geological feature on the south west coast of the Isle of Wight, England (the Back of the Wight). It is west of the village of Chale. It is a sandy coastal ravine, one of a number of such chines on the island created by stream erosion of soft Cretaceous rocks. It leads from the 190 foot high clifftop to a knickpoint approximately halfway down the cliff face above Chale Bay beach.

The Chine is the first and largest of three chines that have been eroded by a small unnamed brook that descends from Chale that drains rainwater from the west side of St. Catherine's Hill. The other two chines are Walpen Chine and New Chine. The brook initially wound its way to the cliff face and its descent over the edge created Ladder chine. As the cliff eroded, the brook found a shorter path to the sea, creating the two other chines to the east of Ladder chine. Ladder Chine is now dry.

The Isle of Wight Coastal Path runs along the cliff top above this chine.

Many Southern Vectis buses carry names that relate to coastal features around the Isle of Wight and Mini Pointer Dart 316, registered SN03LDU, carried the name Ladder Chine before being sold. Coach 590 now carries the name following repaint in Island Coaster livery for a route that operates along the Military Road, close to Ladder Chine.
