= Knickpoint =

Point on a stream's profile where a sudden change in stream gradient occurs

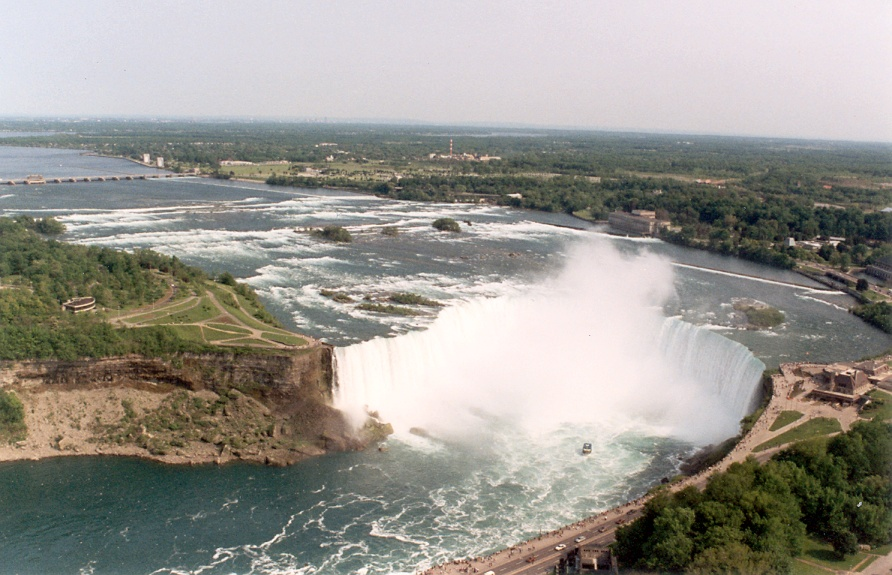
The Horseshoe Falls, one of the three Niagara Falls. The falls are a knickpoint, formed by slower erosion above the falls than below.

In geomorphology, a knickpoint or nickpoint (from the German Knick, a sharp turn) is part of a river or channel where there is a sharp change in channel bed slope, such as a waterfall or lake. Knickpoints reflect different conditions and processes on the river, often caused by previous erosion due to glaciation or variance in lithology. In the cycle of erosion model, knickpoints advance one cycle upstream, or inland, replacing an older cycle. A knickpoint that occurs at the head (furthest upstream extent) of a channel is called a headcut. Headcuts resulting in headward erosion are hallmarks of unstable expanding drainage features such as actively eroding gullies.

Knickpoints also occur on other planetary bodies that previously had or currently have surface liquids, namely Mars and Titan. On Mars, the knickpoints have a common elevation that suggest a common sea level for a former Martian ocean. On Titan, mountain valleys adjacent to the present-day hydrocarbon seas show evidence of knickpoints and recent sea-level change.

== Formation ==
Knickpoints are formed by the influence of tectonics, climate history, and/or lithology. For example, uplift along a fault over which a river is flowing will often result in an unusually steep reach along a channel, known as a knickzone. Glaciation resulting in a hanging valley are often prime spots for knickpoints. If lithology of the rock varies, such as shale amongst igneous rock, erosion will occur more steadily in the softer rock than the surrounding, tougher rock.

Base level is the elevation of the surface of the water body into which a river ultimately drains, usually the ocean. A drop in base level causes a response by the river system to carve into the landscape. This incision begins at the formation of a knickpoint, and its upstream migration depends heavily upon the drainage area (and so the discharge of the river), material through which it cuts, and how large the drop in base level was.

== Modern examples ==
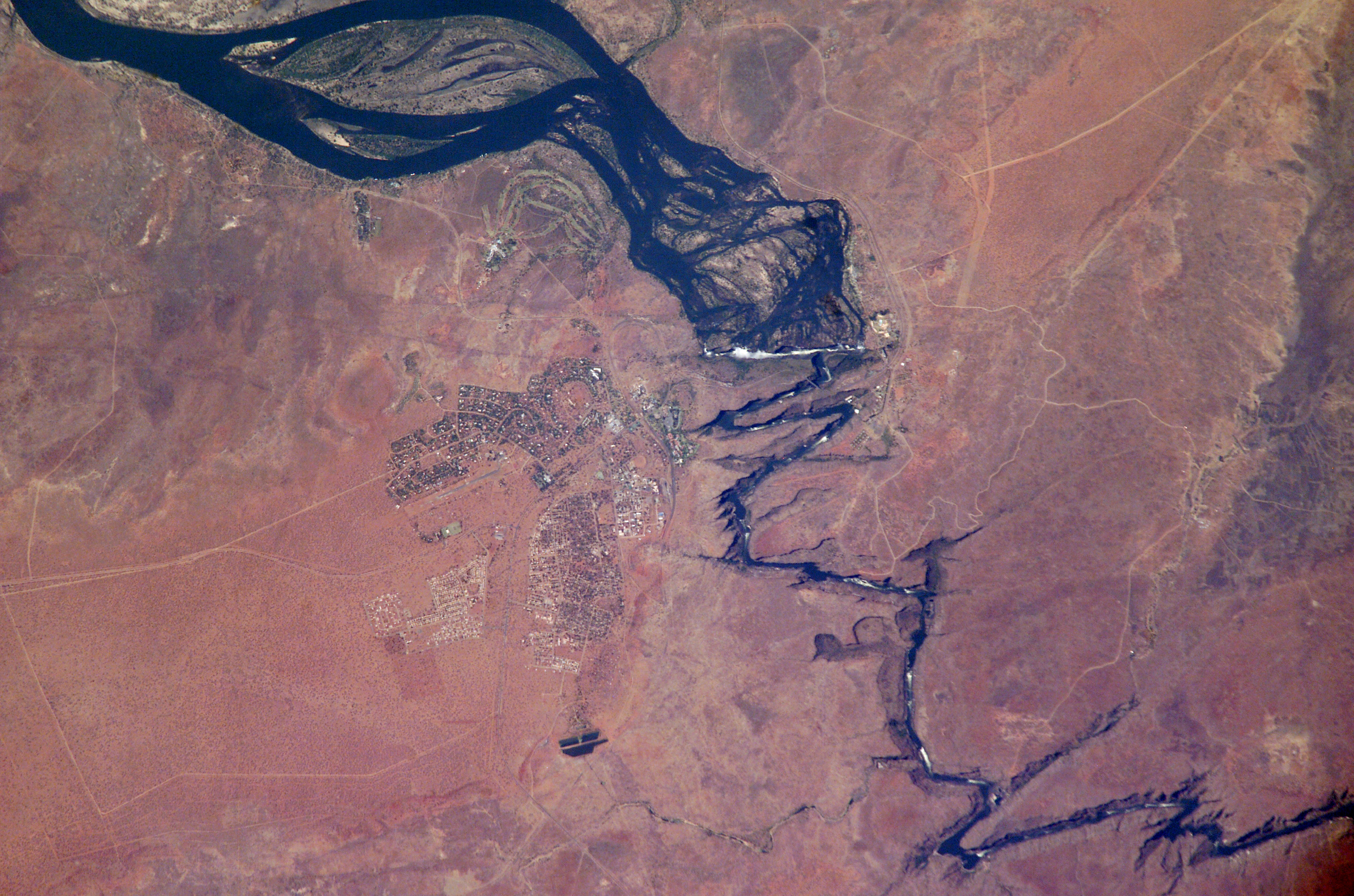
In this satellite image of Victoria Falls, the gorges below the falls as well as developing crevices below the surface of the river are visible. As the knickpoint recedes upstream, these crevices will become, in turn, the location of the Falls.

Knickpoints include both waterfalls and some lakes. These features are common in rivers with a sufficient slope, i.e. enough change in elevation above sea level over their length to encourage degradation.

=== Influenced by lithology ===
Variations in stability of the underlying rock influence development of a bedrock-channeled river, as the waters erode different rock types at different rates. Victoria Falls, on the Zambezi River, is a spectacular example of this. The gorges visible by satellite imagery illustrate the erosional processes behind the formation of the falls. Here, much of the surface rock is a massive basalt sill, with large cracks filled with easily weathered sandstone made visible by the Zambezi's course across the land. The gorges downstream of the falls through which it flows were eroded over time by the action of the water.

=== Influenced by tectonic activity ===
Throughout New Zealand, tectonic uplift and faulting are actively contributing to knickpoint initiation and recession. The Waipoua River system, on the North island, has been studied and used to create mathematical models to predict the behavior of knickpoints. The study showed a direct correlation between upstream drainage area and rate of migration, producing modeled data closely approximating the collected data. The Waipoua River system incises through sediments, for the most part, as opposed to bedrock.

=== Influenced by glacial activity ===
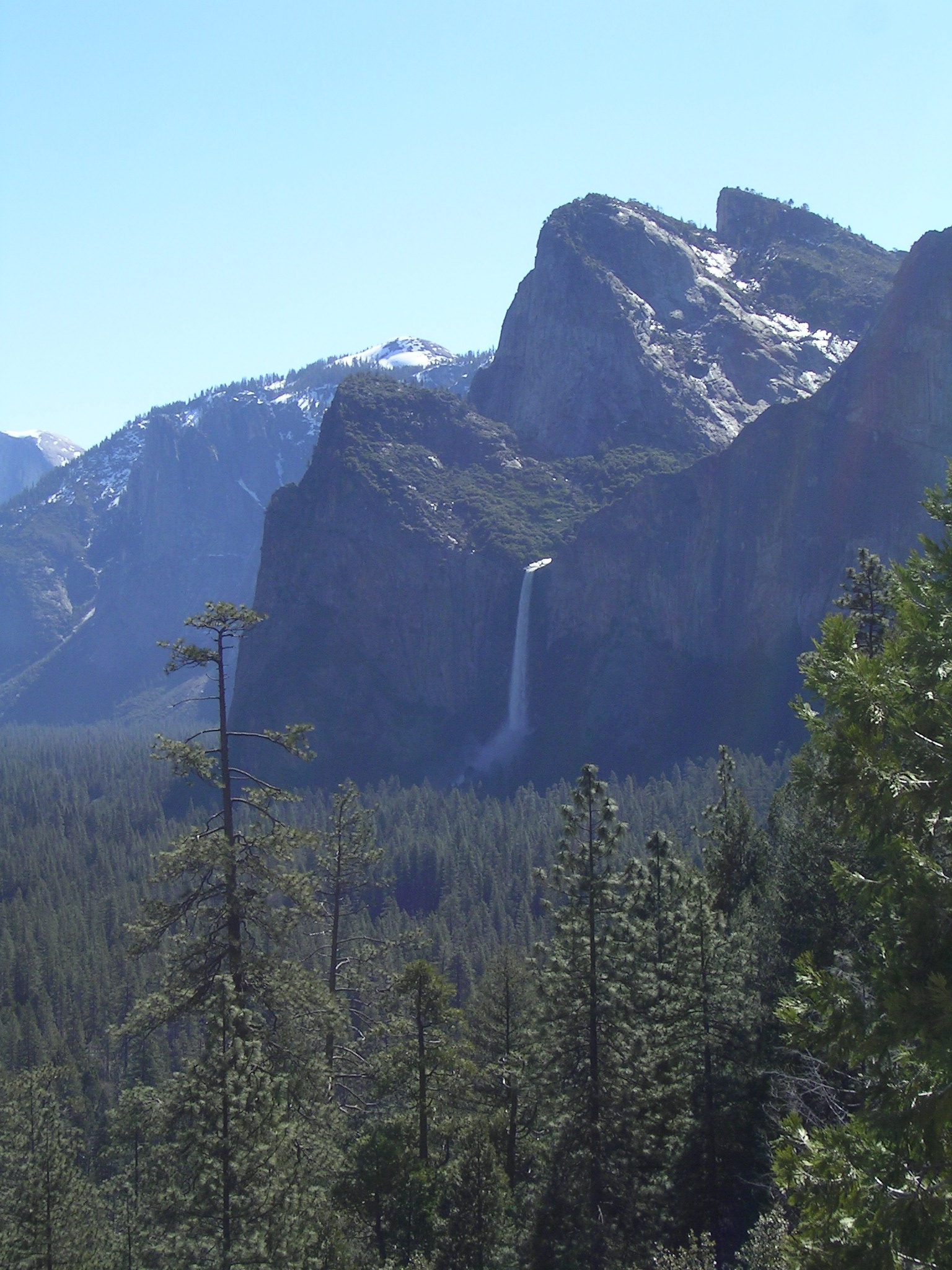
Bridalveil Fall, in Yosemite, flows over the edge of a glacially-carved hanging valley.

Sharp changes in slope are common in rivers flowing through the heavily carved landscape left behind when glaciers retreat. Glacial valleys, as well as isostatic rebound resulting from the removal of the mass of glacial ice contribute to this.

Niagara Falls, on the border of the United States and Canada, is a characteristic example of knickpoint. The falls have slowed in migration from approximately 1m per year as of 1900 to their modern 10 cm per year. The falls, particularly Horseshoe Falls, are dramatically steep and caused by glaciation. The Great Lakes themselves lie in the depressions left behind by glaciers, as the crust is still rebounding.

Bridalveil Fall, in Yosemite Valley, California, pours over the lip of a hanging valley.

== Paleomorphology ==
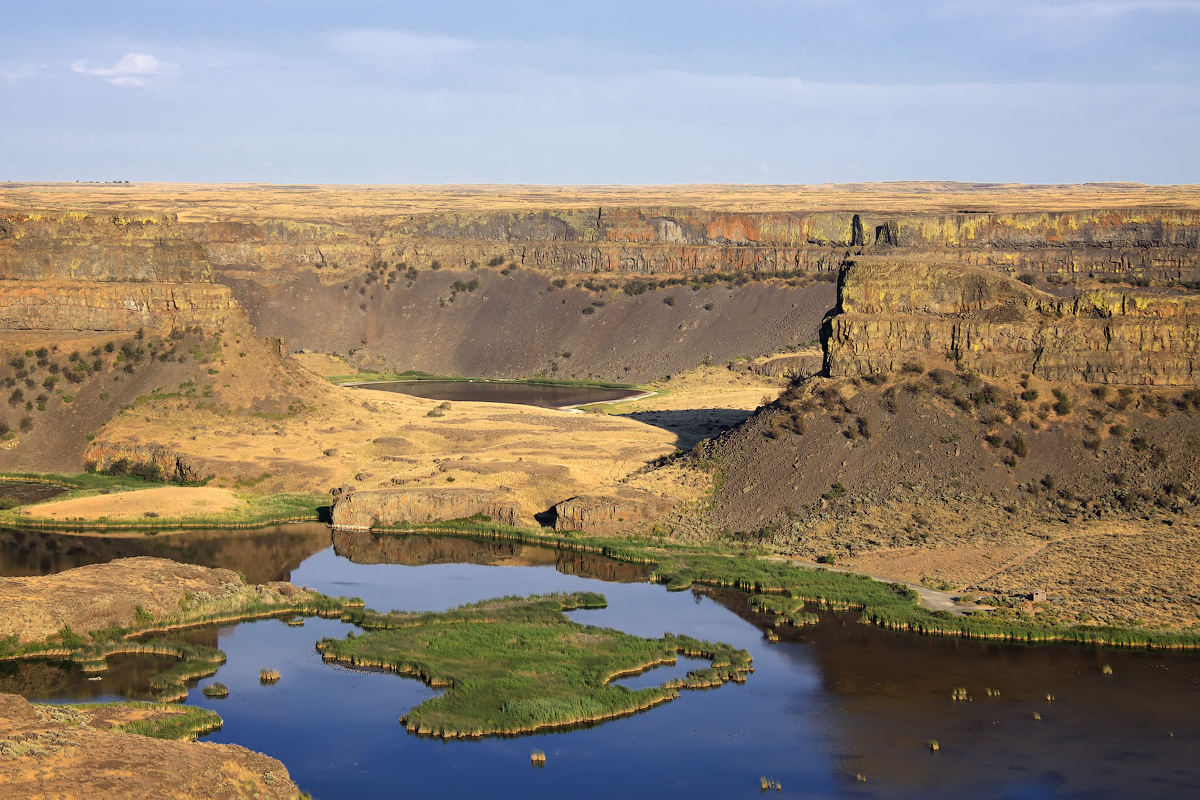
Dry Falls, Washington: a prehistoric knickpoint

Evidence of a knickpoint in the geologic past can be preserved in the shape of the bedrock below any subsequent depositions, as well as within sedimentary depositions left unchanged by human or other activity. Lakes characteristically fill in with sediment over time, but waterfalls often erode away. There are few obvious, dry examples still visible today of prehistoric knickpoints.

=== Evidence of massive prehistoric flooding ===
Dry Falls, a 3.5 mi long precipice in central Washington, is an example of an ancient knickpoint. Geologic evidence strongly suggests that the water which formed this feature flowed over the Channeled Scablands, bursting from the glacial lake Missoula during an event known as the Missoula Floods and into the Columbia River Gorge.

=== Evidence within karst topography ===
On the Upper Cumberland River, Tennessee, there exist a series of hydrologically abandoned caves which still hold river-deposited sediments. These caves were the subject of an effort to measure the rate of knickpoint migration along the river, as well as to approximate the discharge of the river over time. In karst topography, a river dropping in level influences more than just its channel; as there is no longer water flowing at a certain level, caves and water tables will drop locally to the new level.

=== Evidence of large-scale base level drop ===
Large drainages into the oceans the world over can be seen to have continued over land which was once exposed, whether due to tectonic subsidence, sea level rise, or other factors. Bathymetric imagery is available for much of the United States' western coast, and in particular the ocean floor just offshore of rivers in the Pacific Northwest exhibit such underwater features.

In certain locations there are still knickpoints preserved in these drowned river channels and valleys. A study conducted within the Mediterranean basin focused on such features. Here, incision was caused by the closing of the Mediterranean at the end of the Miocene. This sudden lack of ocean water influx allowed the basin to decrease in volume and increase in salinity, and as a result of the drop in surface level many of the rivers which flow still today into the Mediterranean began to incise.

== Movement ==
As is observed for many major waterfalls, knickpoints migrate upstream due to bedrock erosion leaving in their wake deep channels and abandoned floodplains, which then become terraces. Knickpoint retreat is easily demonstrated in some locations affected by postglacial isostatic response and relative sea-level drop such as in Scotland. In other areas, dating of exposed bedrock terraces is more consistent with spatially uniform incision and persistence of the knickzone at about the same location.

A river, having gained or lost potential energy with its changed slope, will then proceed to work the knickpoints out of its system by either erosion (in the case of waterfalls; gained potential energy) or deposition (in the case of lakes; lost potential energy) in order for the river to reattain its smooth concave graded profile.

The rates of knickpoint migration, in the case of waterfalls, generally range between 1mm and 10 cm per year, with some exceptional values.

=== Mathematical modeling ===
Knickpoint propagation is typically modelled with the semi empirical stream power law where the drainage basin size is used as a proxy for discharge, which in turn has a positive nonlinear correlation to the rate of knickpoint migration. Both analytical and numerical solutions have been proposed to solve the stream power law.

== Automated extraction in GIS ==
Knickpoints and knickzones can be semiautomatically extracted from Digital Elevation Models in Geographic Information System software (i.e. ArcGIS). The problem with most of existing methods is that they are frequently subjective and require time-consuming data processing. A solution for these problems is a tool designed for ArcGIS, called Knickzone Extraction Tool (KET) which vastly automates the extraction process.

== See also ==
- Hydrology
- Stream gradient
