= Waipoua River (Northland) =

Location
- Country: New Zealand

Physical characteristics
- Mouth
  - location: Tasman Sea
  - coordinates: 35°40′02″S 173°28′31″E
- Length: 17 km (11 mi)

The Waipoua River is a river of the Northland Region of New Zealand's North Island. It flows generally west from its sources in the Parataiko Range to reach the Tasman Sea 15 kilometres southeast of the mouth of the Hokianga Harbour. Much of the river's length is through the Waipoua Kauri Forest.

== See also ==
- List of rivers of New Zealand
