= Atherfield Lifeboat Station =

Former RNLI lifeboat station on the Isle of Wight, UK

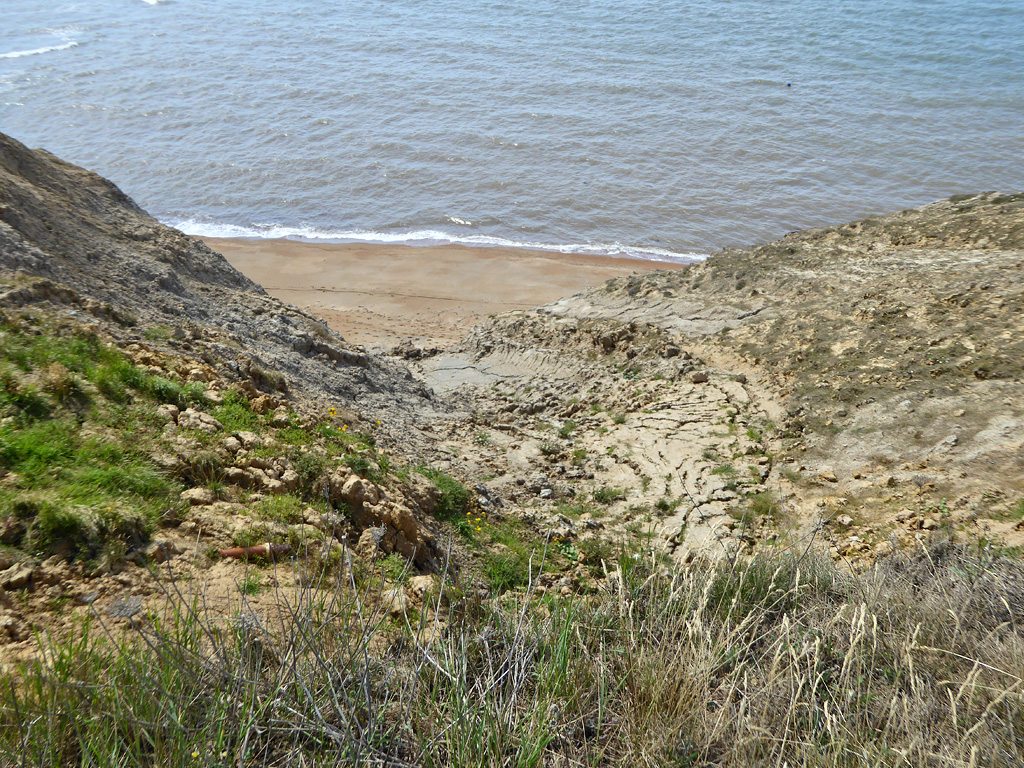
- Atherfield Point, Isle of Wight

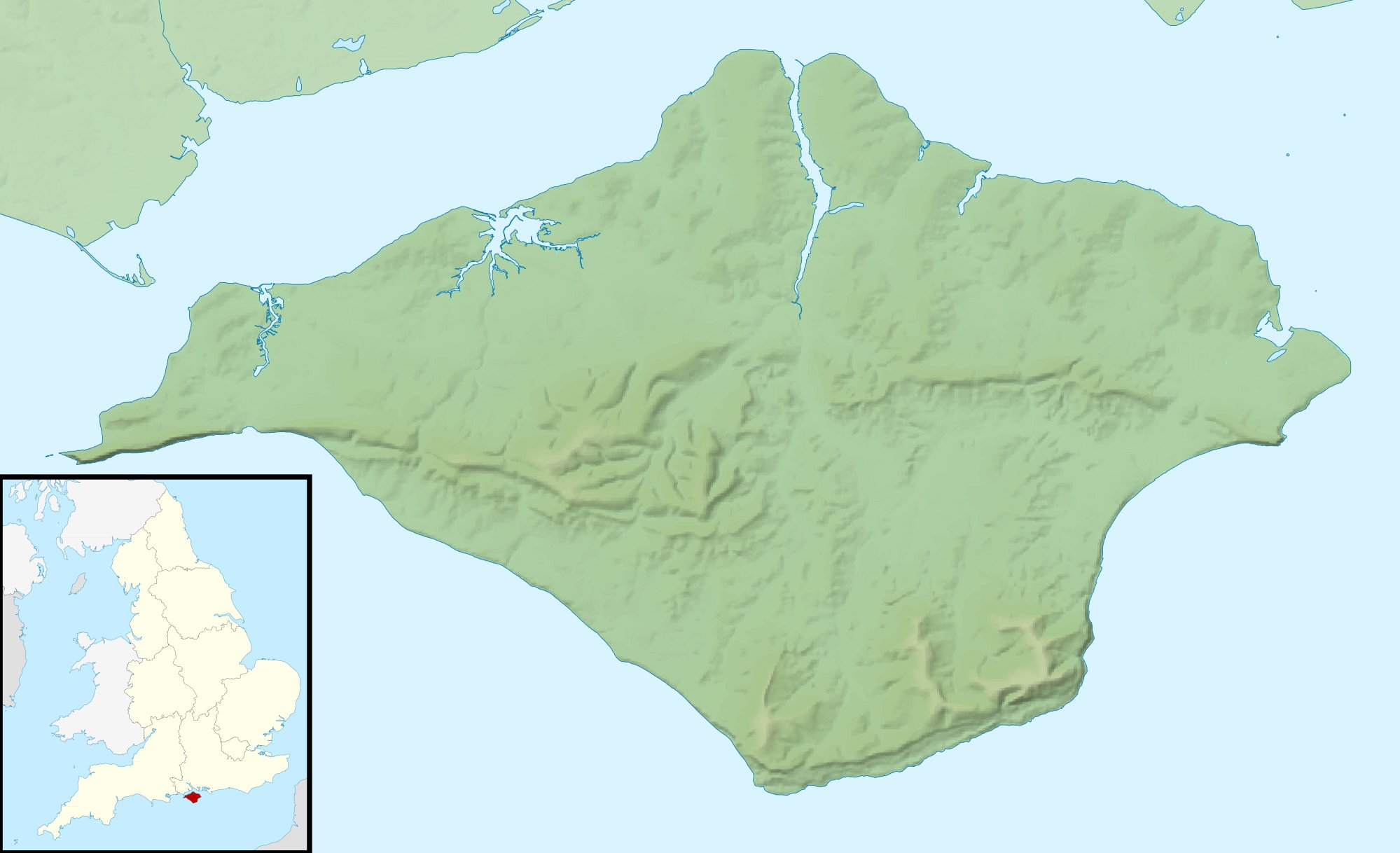
- Atherfield, Isle of Wight

General information
- Status: Closed
- Type: RNLI Lifeboat Station
- Location: Atherfield Point, Atherfield, Isle of Wight, England
- Coordinates: 50°36′36.2″N 1°21′37.4″W
- Opened: 27 October 1890
- Closed: 2 December 1915

Atherfield Lifeboat Station was located at Atherfield Point, near the village of Atherfield, on the south west coast of the Isle of Wight.

A lifeboat was first placed here in 1890 by the Royal National Lifeboat Institution (RNLI).

After operating for just 25 years, Atherfield Lifeboat Station closed in 1915.

== History ==
Following the formation of the Royal National Institution for the Preservation of Life from Shipwreck (RNIPLS) in 1824, (later to become the RNLI in 1854), medals for gallantry were awarded, even if no lifeboat was involved. Between 1832 and 1857, no less than 17 medals were awarded for service around the Atherfield coast.

In the early hours of 14 January 1843, in a strong gale, the brig George was wrecked at Atherfield whilst on passage from South Shields to Grenada. At daybreak, Lieutenants John Bulley and William Vicary of H.M. Coastguard, and their men, fired rocket lines to the vessel. Unsuccessful at first, they eventually managed to recover one of the crew, who informed them that the Master and Mate had been washed overboard, but 10 men were still aboard. Bulley and Vicary then took command of two small fishing boats, with a crew of coastguard and local fishermen, and in poor conditions, rescued the 10 men, moments before the vessel broke up. Bulley and Vicary were each awarded the RNIPLS Gold Medal, with the other nine rescuers each awarded the RNIPLS Silver Medal.

Two RNLI lifeboats had been placed further north along the coast at Brooke and Brighstone Grange in 1860, but it was only in 1890 that a third boat was provided for Atherfield. She was a 31-foot self-righting 'Pulling and Sailing' (P&S) lifeboat, one with sails and (10) oars, and was built by Waterman Brothers, at a cost of £252. The boat was transported by rail free of charge from London to Portsmouth by the London, Brighton and South Coast Railway Company, where it was collected by the crew, and sailed to the Atherfield station.

A corrugated-iron boathouse was constructed on the top of the 76 ft (23 m) cliffs at Atherfield, and the boat would be launched down a 240 ft (73 m) long, steep 1-in-3 path, down to the shore, over skids or railway sleepers. A winch was installed to haul the lifeboat back up the cliff. Placed on service on 27 October 1890, the boat, funded from the bequest of the late Mrs Swift of Kensington, was named Catherine Swift (ON 278). The inauguration was attended by their Royal Highnesses Princess Louise, Marchioness of Lorne, and Prince Henry of Battenberg, the Institution being represented by Admiral Sir Augustus Phillimore KCB FRGS, and the Chief Inspector of Life-boats, Capt. H. W. Chetwynd, RN.

There were no less than seven brothers on the crew, including Coxswain William Cotton, and Second Coxswain David Cotton, both recipients of the RNLI Silver Medal, for their service on the Brighstone Grange lifeboat Worcester Cadet (ON 226), to the full-rigged ship Sirenia on 9 March 1888.

At 22:00 on Sunday 31 January 1892, the Atlantic steamship Eider of the Norddeutscher Lloyd company, on passage from New York to Bremen, ran aground on the Atherfield Ledge in thick fog, having not seen the Needles Lighthouse. She was carrying 163 crew, 227 passengers, 500 sacks of mail, and £300,000 worth of gold specie and silver ingots. The Atherfield lifeboat Catherine Swift was the first to arrive to her aid, but in the hope of being refloated, Capt. Heineke declined assistance. Tugs arrived, but failed to free the vessel.

On the Monday morning, in worsening weather, lifeboats from Brighstone Grange and Atherfield attended the vessel, along with the lifeboat from Brooke after five hours hard rowing. In batches of 13 or 14 people at a time, the three lifeboats returned all the passengers to shore. The crew, and most of the mail, were recovered on Tuesday. On Wednesday, the lifeboat crews recovered the remainder of the mail, and with the permission from the RNLI, the gold and silver, which was then handed to the charge of the armed coastguard. The lifeboatmen received a monetary reward for each silver ingot, or box of gold bullion recovered. Visitors to the scene were Prince Henry of Battenberg, Governor of the Isle of Wight, and on the Friday, both the Prince of Wales (later King Edward VII) and Prince George (later King George V), who would personally convey the thanks of Her Majesty Queen Victoria to the three coxswains. All three coxswains were awarded the RNLI Silver Medal, along with an inscribed gold watch, presented by His Imperial Majesty Wilhelm II, Emperor of Germany.

For reasons unknown, the Catherine Swift (ON 278) would only serve for 2 years at Atherfield. After 1992, she was withdrawn, and subsequently only used for demonstration purposes. A fractionally larger boat was constructed by regular lifeboat builders Woolfe and Sons of Shadwell, arriving on the 29 December 1892. This boat would also carry the name Catherine Swift (ON 354).

On 3 December 1906, the lifeboat was replaced once again, this time with a 35-foot self-righting (P&S) lifeboat, built by Thames Ironworks. Funded by Mrs Gilbert W. Moss of Aigburth, Liverpool, the boat was named Gem (ON 568), and would serve for nine years. Mrs Moss would herself perform the naming ceremony, held on 30 April 1907. After a service of dedication and hymns by the choirs of Chale and Shorwell, Mrs Moss said "I have great pleasure in naming this Life-boat the Gem. My best wishes go with her, with the crew who man her, and with all whom she may save." followed by the breaking of a bottle of wine on the bow of the lifeboat. Following a successful launch and demonstration of the lifeboat, the crew and the helpers were again the recipients of the generosity of Mrs Moss, with a dinner in the evening at the Crown Hotel, Shorwell.

By 1915, a decline in the number of sailing vessels at the mercy of the weather, meant that fewer lifeboats were needed. With the Atherfield launchway suffering from coastal erosion, causing difficulty when trying to launch, it was decided to maintain the station at Brooke, and close both the Brighstone Grange and Atherfield stations. Atherfield Lifeboat Station closed on 2 December 1915.

In 25 years, the Atherfield lifeboat had launched 39 times, and saved 157 lives. The boathouse was dismantled in 1916, and reconstructed at the RNLI HQ in Poplar, London, although sold two years later for £110. The Gem (ON 568) would later serve at Hartlepool, before being sold to the Latvian Lifeboat Service in 1925.

== Station honours ==
The following are awards made at Atherfield.

- RNIPLS Gold Medal

Lt. John Bulley, RN, H.M. Coastguard – 1843
Lt. William Vicary, RN, H.M. Coastguard – 1843

Lt. John Bulley, RN, H.M. Coastguard – 1848 (Second Service Gold Boat)

- RNIPLS Silver Medal

James Thomas, Boatman, H.M. Coastguard – 1832
Henry Stubbs, Boatman, H.M. Coastguard – 1832

John Wheeler, fisherman – 1837

Lt. John Bulley, RN, H.M. Coastguard – 1838

Lt. John Bulley, RN, H.M. Coastguard – 1841 (Second-Service clasp)

Edward Pitt, Boatman, H.M. Coastguard – 1843
Daniel Drayson, Boatman, H.M. Coastguard – 1843
John Heal, Fisherman – 1843
John Trent, Fisherman – 1843
William Warn Snr., Fisherman – 1843
William Warn Jnr., Fisherman – 1843
Charles Wheeler, Fisherman – 1843
John Wheeler, Fisherman – 1843
Robert Wheeler, Fisherman – 1843

- RNLI Silver Medal

Lt. Thomas Young, RN, Chief Officer, H.M. Coastguard – 1857

James Thomas, CHief Boatman, H.M. Coastguard, St Catherine's Point – 1859

William Cotton, Coxswain – 1892 (Second-Service clasp)

- Gold Watch, presented by His Imperial Majesty Wilhelm II, Emperor of Germany

William Cotton, Coxswain – 1892

- The Thanks of the Institution inscribed on Vellum

F. Rendle – 1859
F. Wheeler – 1859
H. Wheeler – 1859

Charles Dabell, Honorary Secretary – 1892

== Roll of honour ==
In memory of those lost whilst serving at Atherfield.

- Lost when their fishing boat capsized, attempting to rescue the crew of the ship Llanrumney, 30 December 1847

J. Heal, fisherman
W. Weam, fisherman

== Atherfield lifeboats ==
=== Pulling & Sailing (P&S) lifeboats ===
ON (Note: ON is the RNLI's Official Number of the boat.)	Name	Built	On station	Class	Comments
278	Catherine Swift	1890	1890−1892	31-foot Self-righting (P&S)	(Note: 31-foot x 7-foot 3in (10-oared) self-righting (P&S) lifeboat, gift of the late Mrs C. Swift of Kensington and Chale, built by Waterman Brothers of Cremyll, costing £253.)
354	Catherine Swift	1892	1892−1906	34-foot Self-righting (P&S)	(Note: 34-foot x 7-foot 6in (10-oared) self-righting (P&S) lifeboat, gift of the late Mrs C. Swift of Kensington and Chale, built by Woolfe of Shadwell, London, costing £485.)
568	Gem	1906	1906−1915	35-foot Self-righting (P&S)	(Note: 35-foot x 8-foot 6in (10-oared) self-righting (P&S) lifeboat, gift of Mrs G. W. Moss of Aigburth, built by Thames Ironworks of Blackwall, London, costing £831.)

== See also ==
- List of RNLI stations
- List of former RNLI stations
- Independent lifeboats in Britain and Ireland
