= Back of the Wight =

Region of the Isle of Wight, England

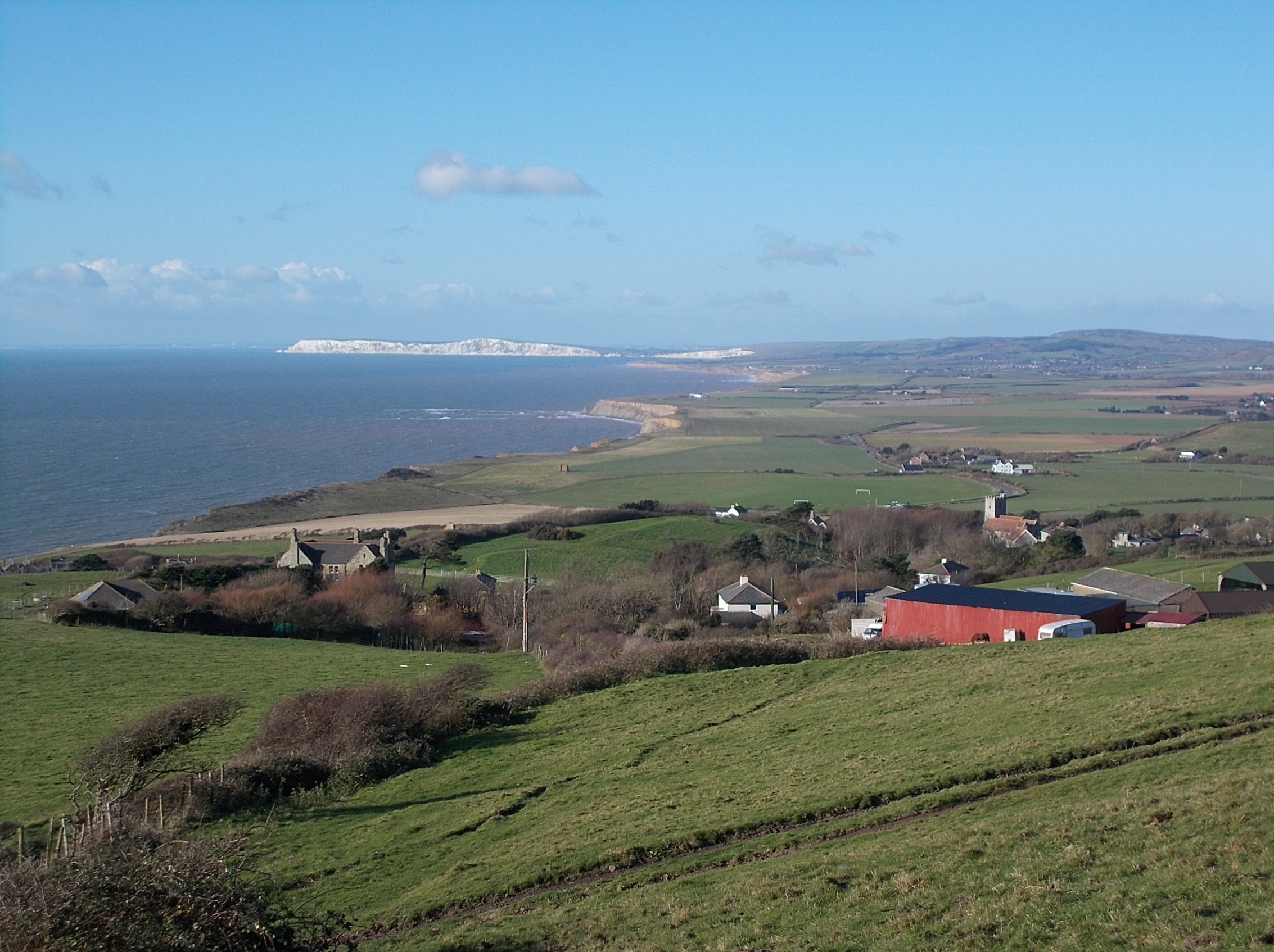
The "Back of the Wight" viewed from St Catherine's Down

Back of the Wight (also known as West Wight) is an area on the Isle of Wight in England. The area has a distinct historical and social background, and is geographically isolated by the chalk hills, immediately to the North, as well as poor public transport infrastructure. Primarily agricultural, the Back of the Wight is made up of small villages spread out along the coast, including Brighstone, Shorwell and Mottistone.

== Geography ==
The geographical boundaries of the Back of the Wight are imprecise and vary according to interpretation, however roughly speaking it comprises all the land located South of the Downs and East of Freshwater Bay until the curve in the Downs meets the sea near St. Catherine's Point. The main part of the Back of the Wight is formed of a large bay 18 miles long. The shore is edged by cliffs averaging around 300 feet high from Freshwater to Compton, broken at two points, Grange Chine and Brook Chine, which provide the only easy, natural access to the sea through steep gorges. Stretching out from this coast are three ledges of resistant rock, the Brook, Brighstone and Atherfield ledges, on which many ships have been wrecked over the years.

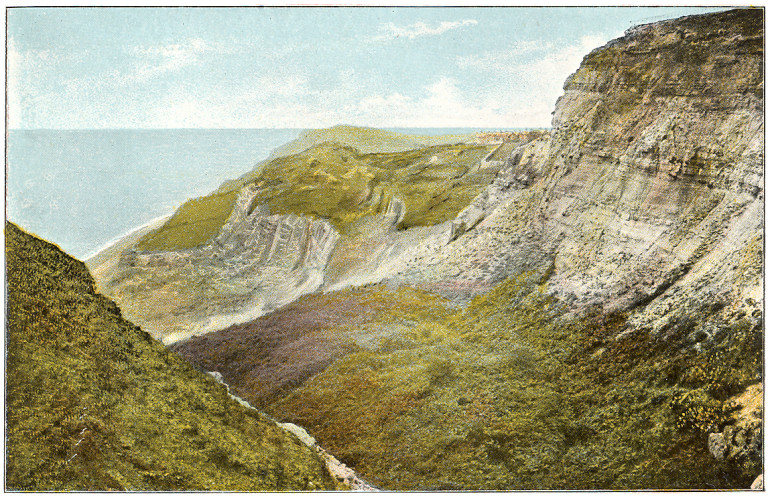
Blackgang Chine, circa 1910

Past Compton and Brighstone, the coast is wild and there are only four access points inland, Whale, Walpen and Ladder Chine and the greatest of them all, Blackgang Chine, which was once a home of smugglers and experienced a massive landslide during the early-20th century, leaving a much larger chine in its place. Blackgang Chine is home to a theme park of the same name, which was the first theme park to be constructed in the United Kingdom.

The most obvious natural features on land are the downs that enclose the area and cut it off from the rest of the island; parts of these are protected as a Site of Special Scientific Interest and large stretches owned by the National Trust. Brighstone Forest, which covers the top of Brighstone Down, is the largest on the island.

At St. Catherine's Point, the Back of the Wight ends and the Undercliff of Ventnor begins.

=== Geology ===
Like the geology of the Isle of Wight as a whole the geology of the area is varied; at Freshwater the Upper Cretaceous Chalk is exposed resulting in substantial cliffs until Compton, at this point other geological types begin to occur including clays, these formations are unique for the way the layers have been tilted exposing ancient, fossil bearing strata of the Vectis Formation overlaid with the Wessex Formation. These Wealden rocks date from around 120 million years ago, thus younger than similar rocks elsewhere in the UK.

=== Settlements ===
Most of the settlements in the area are villages or hamlets that have evolved around farms or water courses. Settlement in the area has never been great and the villages are mostly old in construction. Many exist because of medieval churches and manors such as Mottistone Manor. The main settlements are:

- Brighstone, near the centre
- Brook
- Shorwell
- Mottistone
- Chale
- Freshwater, on the edge of the area

== History ==
=== Prehistory ===
There is little evidence of the region having been settled in prehistory; apart from the Longstone at Mottistone there are few artefacts. That there were once dinosaurs is proved by the numerous types of bones and fossils that have been excavated from the cliffs, including some species unique to the island. At the time the fossils were laid down, between 125 and 110 million years ago, the island was at a latitude similar to that of North Africa. There is an abundance of fossils on the island, especially of crustaceans and nautiloids such Ammonites.

=== Romans ===
In AD 43 the Romans invaded the island, which they called Vectis. Although most of their presence was elsewhere, they did build a villa at Rock, Brighstone to make use of the clean waters of the Buddle Brook. During the 4th century the Empire broke up and the coast began to suffer from raids by Germanic tribes, which repeatedly laid waste to the area.

=== Saxons ===
In Saxon times the island was colonised by Jutes until the reign of King Arwald, who died in battle when the kingdom of Wessex invaded and converted the island at sword point by killing the inhabitants and re-settling it with Saxons. Saint Wilfred and the church were given large parts and converted the survivors. The island had been the last pagan part of England.

The Back of the Wight had a meagre and fragile economy at the time so this increased the hardships on the area by killing many of the population.

=== Middle Ages ===
During medieval times the people of the Back of the Wight were very poor, particularly compared to the new prosperity of towns such as Yarmouth, Newtown and Brading. The people lived a harsh existence exposed to the elements and pirates. They scraped a livelihood from fishing, farming and salvage. Shipwrecks were a great help to these people and some say that the emphasis was on cargo not people. There has never been any proof of islanders wrecking, but given how harsh their lives were it would not be surprising. In 1313, in a famous case the St Mary of Bayonne, from Gascony, ran ashore at Chale Bay. The lord of Chale raised some men and demanded the 53 barrels of wine the ship was carrying. When King Edward II found out, he summoned them to Southampton and had them fined. The wine was destined for a monastery and the church cried sacrilege. As a result of this incident, the first lighthouse on Wight was built at Chale, the St Catherine's Oratory, where the lord's family paid for a light and prayers for his soul. This is the oldest medieval lighthouse in England. Its ruins are now known as the Pepperpot, and a half-built later lighthouse nearby is known as the Salt Shaker. From this period onwards the area lived in fear of French invasions.

=== 18th century and beyond ===
In the 18th century there were a succession of stormy winters that increased the number of wrecks on the Back's coast. Salvage and theft were combined with thriving local smuggling. Many buildings in the area are formed of parts of these ships. The Coastguard were established on the island at this time. They were hated because they fought the smuggling trade, although they were hardly saints; there is an interesting local tale about the commander of the Yarmouth station who "couldn't hear" the sounds of a raging gun battle going on at Alum Bay between smugglers and Coastguard. In 1859 the first lifeboats were put in place at Brighstone and Brook; they took part in many famous rescues and are commemorated in Brighstone Museum, which has many artefacts of the era.

When in 1892 the SS Eider, a German liner, went aground on the Atherfield Ledge, it took "virtually the whole of the sparse human population of the 'Back of the Wight' to get them to sea".

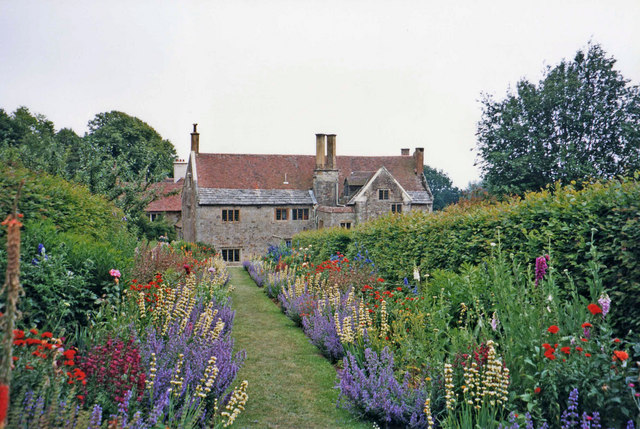
Mottistone Manor and Garden, Isle of Wight

Also in the late 19th century, the area first became popular to visit and some noted figures established homes here, like Mottistone Manor for the noted architects, the Seelys.

On 18 December 2014, A Boeing 767 carrying United Airlines Flight UA28 suffered an engine failure while travelling towards Los Angeles from London Heathrow Airport, and entered a holding pattern over the Back of the Wight for several hours while it dumped fuel, eventually returning to Heathrow some hours later.

=== Noted shipwrecks ===
The Back of the Wight has very little in the way of suitable shelter for sailing vessels and prevailing SW storm winds often forced ships onto the coast. The three ledges of rock that extend underwater at Atherfield, Brighstone and Brooke can cause unpredictable water conditions. As a result of the high volume of shipwrecks that occurred RNLI lifeboat stations were established, one at each of these locations. Several local books include detailed accounts of the lifeboat and coastguard rescues of the sailors of the many ships that have been wrecked on the area's dangerous coast. Some of the more high-profile vessels include:

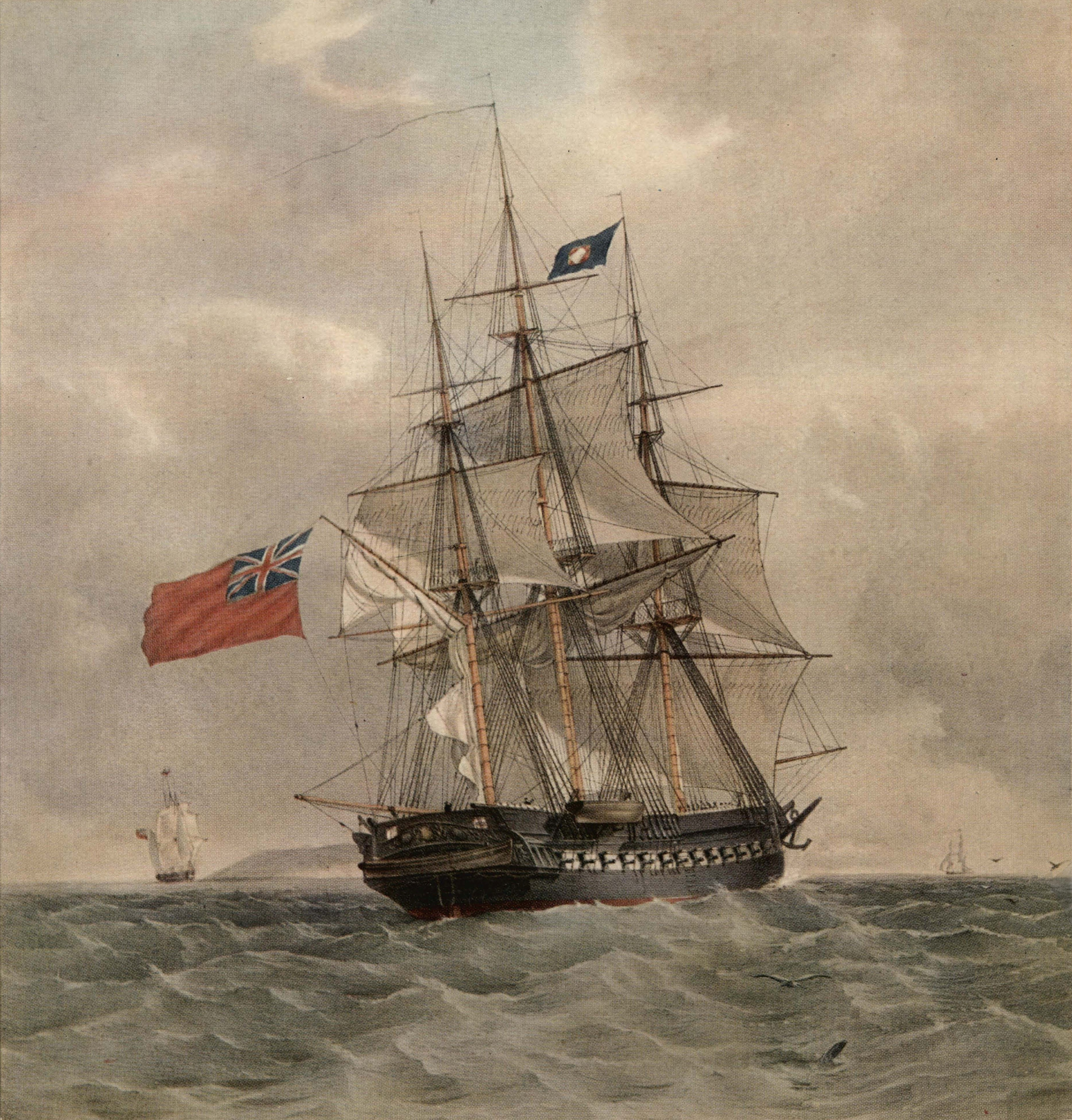
HMS Pomone

- Needles

SS Irex, HMS Pomone, HMS Assurance, SS Varvassi.

- The South West

MV Ice Prince, Vénus, SS Eider, the Sirenia and the Cedrine, whose timbers form part of Mottistone church.

== Today ==
The area is still poorly connected, particularly as erosion threatens the A3055 Military Road ("Millie" to locals), which runs along the coast connecting them. Compton bay and beach are popular with surfers due to waves that come across the Atlantic. Recent cuts have made the bus service more infrequent.

== Economy ==
The economy of the area is largely agricultural and rural with farming using most of the land area. Despite the long coastline, there is little or no local fishing. Tourism provides a significant part of local income and many sites in the area are popular.

Agriculture is still the dominant economic activity of the land. Many residents of the area have Newport as their centre of commerce and culture, using the road over the down to reach it.

Today the region is popular with tourists with attractions such as Blackgang Chine, Isle of Wight Pearl and the picture-postcard villages. The area hosts several events over the year including the Brighstone Christmas Tree Festival, Brighstone Show and Chale Show.

== See also ==
- Dinosaurs of the Isle of Wight
