= SS Eider =

Ocean liner wrecked in 1892

History

Germany
- Name: Eider
- Namesake: Eider
- Owner: Norddeutscher Lloyd, Bremen
- Route: Bremen–New York City
- Builder: John Elder & Co., Govan
- Yard number: 283
- Launched: 15 December 1883
- Fate: Wrecked, 31 January 1892

General characteristics
- Class & type: Rivers-class ocean liner
- Tonnage: 4,722 GRT
- Length: 429 ft 8 in (130.96 m)
- Beam: 47 ft (14 m)
- Propulsion: Steam engine, single screw
- Speed: 16 knots (30 km/h; 18 mph)
- Capacity: 1,204 passengers
- Crew: 167

SS Eider was a 4,179 ton German ocean liner built for Norddeutscher Lloyd in 1884 by John Elder & Co. of Glasgow as the fourth ship in the Rivers class. She had four masts and was a two-funnelled steamer 430 feet (130 m) long, with a crew of 167, and capable of carrying 1,204 passengers. However, she had a short service history, being lost in what is remembered as one of the most impressive and memorable shipwrecks on the coast of the Back of the Wight, a region on the Isle of Wight, England.

== Wreck ==
On 31 January 1892, Eider was heading up the English Channel to Bremen through thick fog. Around 10 p.m. the ship ran hard aground on the Atherfield Ledge, a hard outcrop of rock projecting from the large bay of the Back of the Wight. Captain Heinecke jettisoned cargo and called for tugs. The new Atherfield lifeboat approached from a recently established station on the cliffs, but the captain refused her offer of help.

The tugs did reach Eider, but a gale had arisen that made it impossible for them to get close enough in case they struck the rocks as well. At 10 a.m. the captain decided to evacuate the passengers; however, it was now too rough for the small Atherfield lifeboat, Catherine Swift, to be launched. The bigger lifeboats located at Brooke and Brighstone Grange were launched, but they had much farther to travel. The Brighstone lifeboat, Worcester Cadet, arrived first and carried a dozen women and children to Atherfield beach. The Brooke lifeboat, William Slaney Lewis, reached Eider five hours after being launched and rescued another load of women and children.

By 2 p.m. the sea had worsened to the point where rollers were reaching over the stern, but by 3 p.m. the water had calmed and the lifeboats were relaunched. All the passengers were saved, but the crew stayed on board.

On Tuesday the gale reached storm force and the lifeboats evacuated the crew and bullion from the now badly holed and sinking vessel.

== Result ==
The rescue brought praise for those involved from around the world. The Royal National Lifeboat Institution (RNLI) awarded medals for gallantry to some crew members, and Kaiser Wilhelm II gave each coxswain an engraved gold watch and donated £200 to the RNLI. The ship was later salvaged and declared a total loss.

== Notable passengers ==
Friedrich Trump, grandfather of 45th U.S. President Donald Trump, immigrated from Bremen, Germany, to New York aboard Eider in 1885 at the age of 16.
