= Rivers-class ocean liner =

Class of German express liners

- Elbe, the first ship in the Rivers class

Class overview
- Builders: John Elder & Co., Fairfield Shipbuilding and Engineering Company, Glasgow (9); AG Vulcan, Stettin (2)
- Operators: Norddeutscher Lloyd
- Subclasses: Werra class
- Built: 1881–90
- Completed: 11
- Lost: 3
- Scrapped: 8

The Rivers class was a class of eleven ocean liners of the Norddeutscher Lloyd (NDL), the first class of German express liners. The ships were built between 1881 and 1890, the first nine in Glasgow by John Elder & Co. or the renamed Fairfield Shipbuilding and Engineering Company, the last two in Stettin by Vulcan. All were named for rivers in Germany.

== Background ==
In 1878, the British Guion Line introduced the first express liner on the Atlantic run, the SS Arizona. The new ship was larger than other Atlantic liners and with a speed of 16 knots, she cut the travel time between Southampton and New York City from ten and a half to eight and a half days. Johann Georg Lohmann, who had at the time been director of Norddeutscher Lloyd for one year, in 1880 contracted with the Arizona's builder, John Elder & Co. of Glasgow, to build NDL's own first express liner, in accordance with the company's stated objective of always having the best ships.

== History ==
The SS Elbe was delivered ahead of the contract deadline, set out on her maiden voyage to New York on 26 June 1881 and was such an immediate success that NDL at once ordered two more liners from Elder, the SS Werra (delivered in autumn 1882) and the SS Fulda (early in 1883). The Fulda was the first NDL ship with electric lighting. The SS Eider and SS Ems were added in 1884 and NDL's weekly transatlantic service became known for speed. The Werra set an eastbound speed record of 7 days, 20 hours and 15 minutes. The four ships beginning with the Werra are sometimes classified as a distinct Werra class. The SS Aller, SS Trave and SS Saale were ordered in summer 1885 for summer 1886, specified to be even larger and faster. These were the line's first steel ships, and with them, twice weekly service to New York could be offered. The still larger and faster SS Lahn was ordered in early 1887 and entered service the following year. She was the last single-screw steamer to hold the speed record for the English Channel.

The speed of the new ships caused the United States postal service to choose NDL far more often than other carriers. It was the beginning of the contest for speed in the Atlantic. In addition, their greater size—the Elbe was half again as large as the type which had been the norm in the Atlantic trade, which had not much changed in twenty years— was accompanied by a change in layout which became the new norm. Until the Elbe, liners had almost universally had four decks, the two lowest devoted to cargo, the third to steerage passengers, and the top deck housing cabins; second-class accommodations were forward, first-class aft, each consisting of cabins to port and starboard of a small longitudinal saloon. On the Elbe there was a fifth deck on which a smoking room and ladies' drawing room were located, and the grand saloon was located athwart the ship from one side to the other, separated from the cabins. She resembled the Guion Line's SS Alaska, but was wider and thus more comfortable. This was also the beginning of the designing of ever more luxurious liner interiors designed to cause the passengers, at least in first and second class, to forget they were aboard ship. The Elbe was the first ship to have its interior designed by Johann Poppe, the most distinguished architect and designer in Bremen, who was to design the interiors of all NDL's liners for the next 25 years. In 1892, a voyage on SS Havel, the last ship of the Rivers class, prompted Mark Twain to call it "the delightfulest ship I ever saw" and publish an essay contrasting modern German steamships with their "dull, plain, graceless, gloomy and horribly depressing" predecessors as embodied by Cunard's SS Batavia.

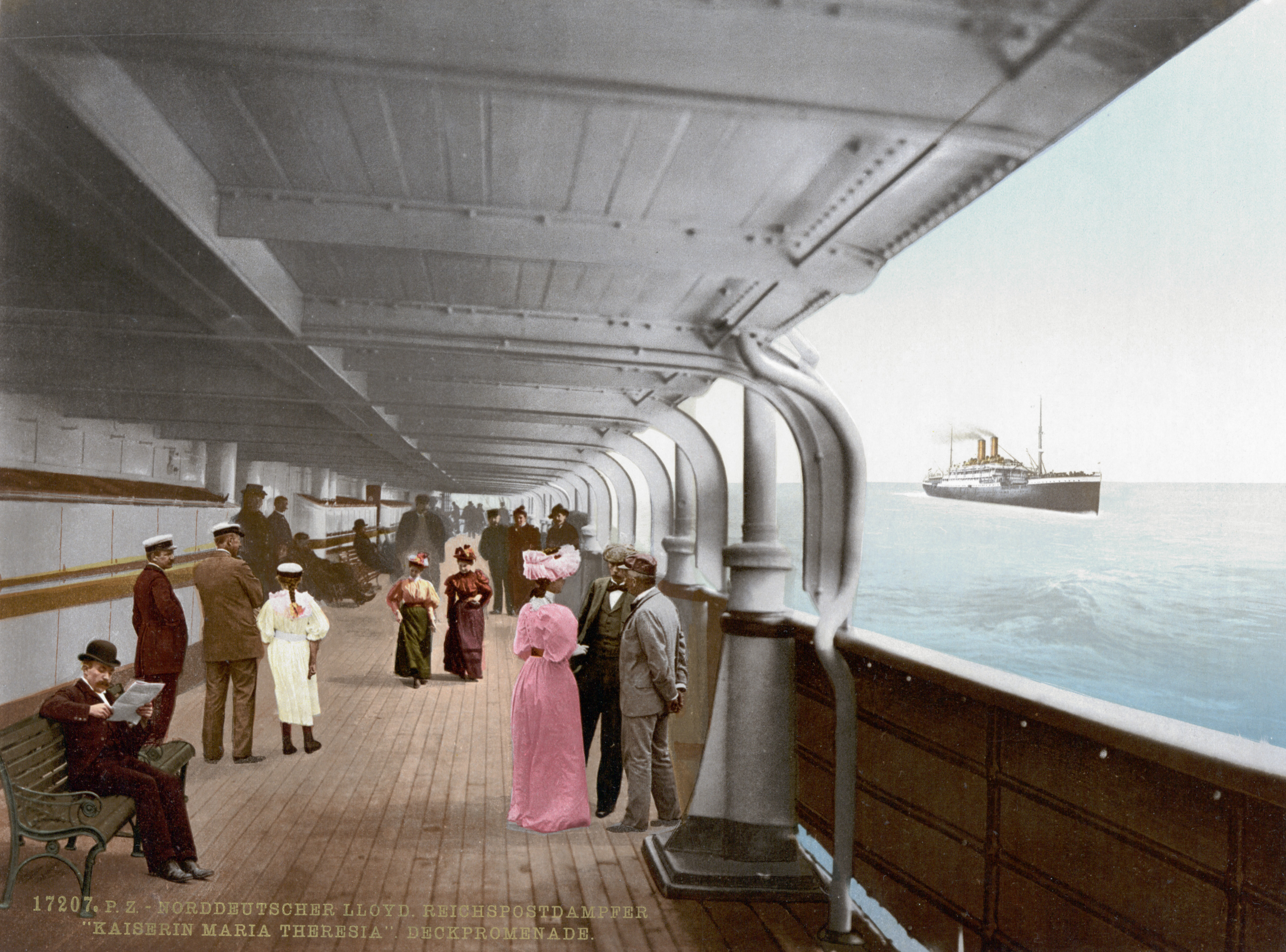
Colourised postcard view of the promenade deck of Kaiserin Maria Theresia, formerly Spree

The final two ships in the class, SS Spree and SS Havel, were ordered in response to the first express liners placed in service by the rival Hamburg America Line (HAPAG), the Augusta Victoria class. They entered service in 1890. Unlike their predecessors, they were built in Germany, by AG Vulcan of Stettin. However, like their predecessors and unlike the HAPAG liners, they were single-screw, and therefore did not meet the expectation of being faster.

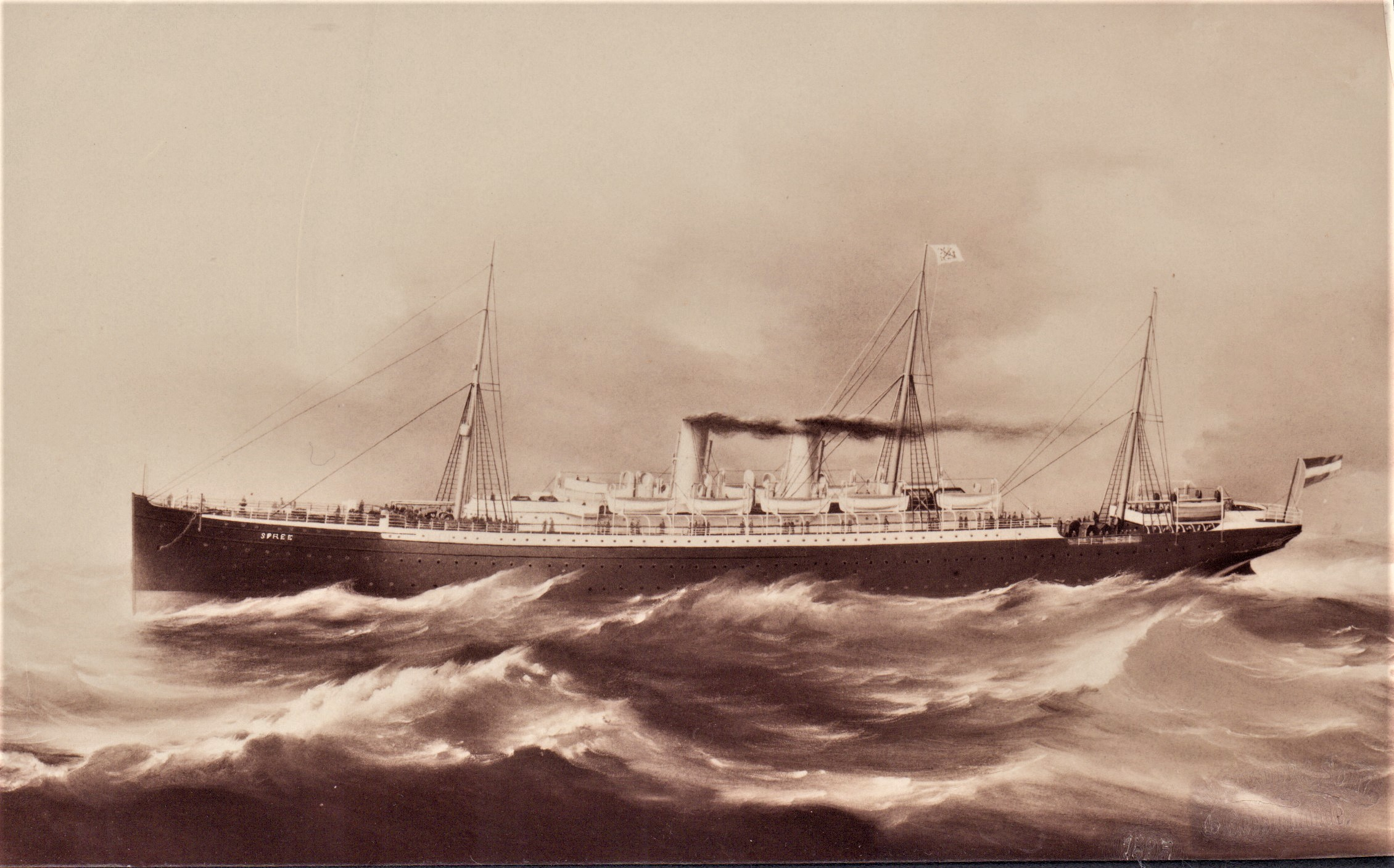
Albumen Photograph 1895 - SS Spree W. Sander & Sohn Photographen Geestemunde print 8.5 x 5.0 inches

The Werra, Fulda and Ems all served a new route between Genoa and Naples and New York which NDL had instituted in 1891.

The Eider went aground off the Isle of Wight on 31 January 1892, was salvaged in March but was then auctioned off to be broken up the following year. On 30 January 1895, the Elbe collided with the English collier Crathie in the Baltic and sank with the loss of 336 lives. Only twenty people in one lifeboat survived. In 1886 the Fulda rescued all 824 people aboard the Cunard liner SS Oregon. She was to have been sold to the Canadian Beaver Line owned by Elder Dempster but was damaged in dock in 1898 or 1899 and sold to be broken up. On 30 June 1900 the Saale burnt out in the fire at the NDL piers in Hoboken, New Jersey, with the loss of 109 people including the captain. She was sold to the Luckenbach Steamship Company of New York and rebuilt as a freighter, renamed J. L. Luckenbach, and ultimately broken up in 1924 as SS Madison.

The Ems was sold to the Beaver Line in 1900 or 1901 and renamed Lake Simcoe; she was broken up in Genoa in 1905. The Werra was chartered for a few years until 1899, sold to Italy in 1901 and broken up in 1903. On 15 June 1887, the Aller collided with a British fishing vessel, the Willie, which sank with the loss of six men; on 27 January 1898, she rescued the crew of the sinking British ship Dago. She was sold in 1902 and broken up in 1904. The Lahn was sold to the Russian Volunteer Fleet in 1904 and renamed Russ; she later returned to passenger service as the Dniester.

The Spree rescued the crew of the burning SS Abyssinia in 1891. In 1892 and 1895 she broke her shaft and had to be towed into port. In 1897, she was converted to twin screws, lengthened, given a third funnel, and renamed Kaiserin Maria Theresia, attaining the target speed of 20 knots with ease. She replaced the rejected Kaiser Friedrich. In 1904 she was also sold to the Russians and renamed Ural; she was sunk the following year at the Battle of Tsushima.

On 13 June 1889, the Trave collided with and sank the Russian schooner David; on 21 June 1892, she collided with and sank the American square-rigger Fred B. Taylor, causing two deaths. She became the last of the class in NDL service. After being laid up since 1903, she sailed between Bremerhaven and New York from March 1906 to November 1907, was sold in 1908 and broken up in 1909.

On 18 February 1892, the Havel collided with and sank the Italian barque Mascotta off Long Island while under mandatory pilotage. She continued on without aiding the survivors. She was sold to the Spanish Navy in 1898 and renamed Meteoro. She later returned to passenger service with the Compañía Transatlántica Española as the Alfonso XII and was broken up in 1927.

== Ships ==
Ship	Tonnage	Builder	Launch	Fate	Later names
SS Elbe	4,511 GT	John Elder & Co. Ltd., Glasgow	4 April 1881	Sank after collision, 30 January 1895	
SS Werra	4,817 GT	John Elder & Co. Ltd., Glasgow	4 July 1882	Sold to Italy, 1901; scrapped, 1903	
SS Fulda	4,816 GT	John Elder & Co. Ltd., Glasgow	15 November 1882	Sold and scrapped after being damaged in dock, 1898	
SS Eider	4,722 GT	John Elder & Co. Ltd., Glasgow	15 December 1883	Aground, 1892; salvaged, auctioned and scrapped, 1893	
SS Ems	4,730 GT	John Elder & Co. Ltd., Glasgow	4 June 1884	Sold to Elder Dempster Beaver Line, 1900 or 1901; scrapped 1905	Lake Simcoe, 1900 or 1901
SS Aller	4,966 GT	Fairfield Shipbuilding & Engineering Co., Glasgow	24 April 1886	Sold, 1902; scrapped, 1904	
SS Trave	4,969 GT	Fairfield Shipbuilding & Engineering Co., Glasgow	5 June 1886	Sold and scrapped, 1908	
SS Saale	4,967 GT	Fairfield Shipbuilding & Engineering Co., Glasgow	21 April 1886	Burnt out in dock fire, 30 June 1900; sold to Luckenbach Steamship Company; scrapped, 1924	J. L. Luckenbach, 1900; Princess, 1922; Madison, 1923
SS Lahn	5,099 GT	Fairfield Shipbuilding & Engineering Co., Glasgow	7 September 1887	Sold to Russian Volunteer Fleet, 1904; "probably broken up about 1927."	Russ, 1904; Dniester
SS Spree	6,966 GT; 8,500 GT	AG Vulcan, Stettin	7 May 1890	Rebuilt 1897; sold to Russia, 1904; sunk at Battle of Tsushima, 1905	Kaiserin Maria Theresia, 1897; Ural, 1904
SS Havel	6,966 GT	AG Vulcan, Stettin	30 August 1890	Sold to Spanish Navy, 1898; transferred to Compañía Transatlántica Española; scrapped, 1927	Meteoro, 1898; Alfonso XII
