= Atherfield =

Place on the Isle of Wight

Coordinates: 50.619°N 1.352°W

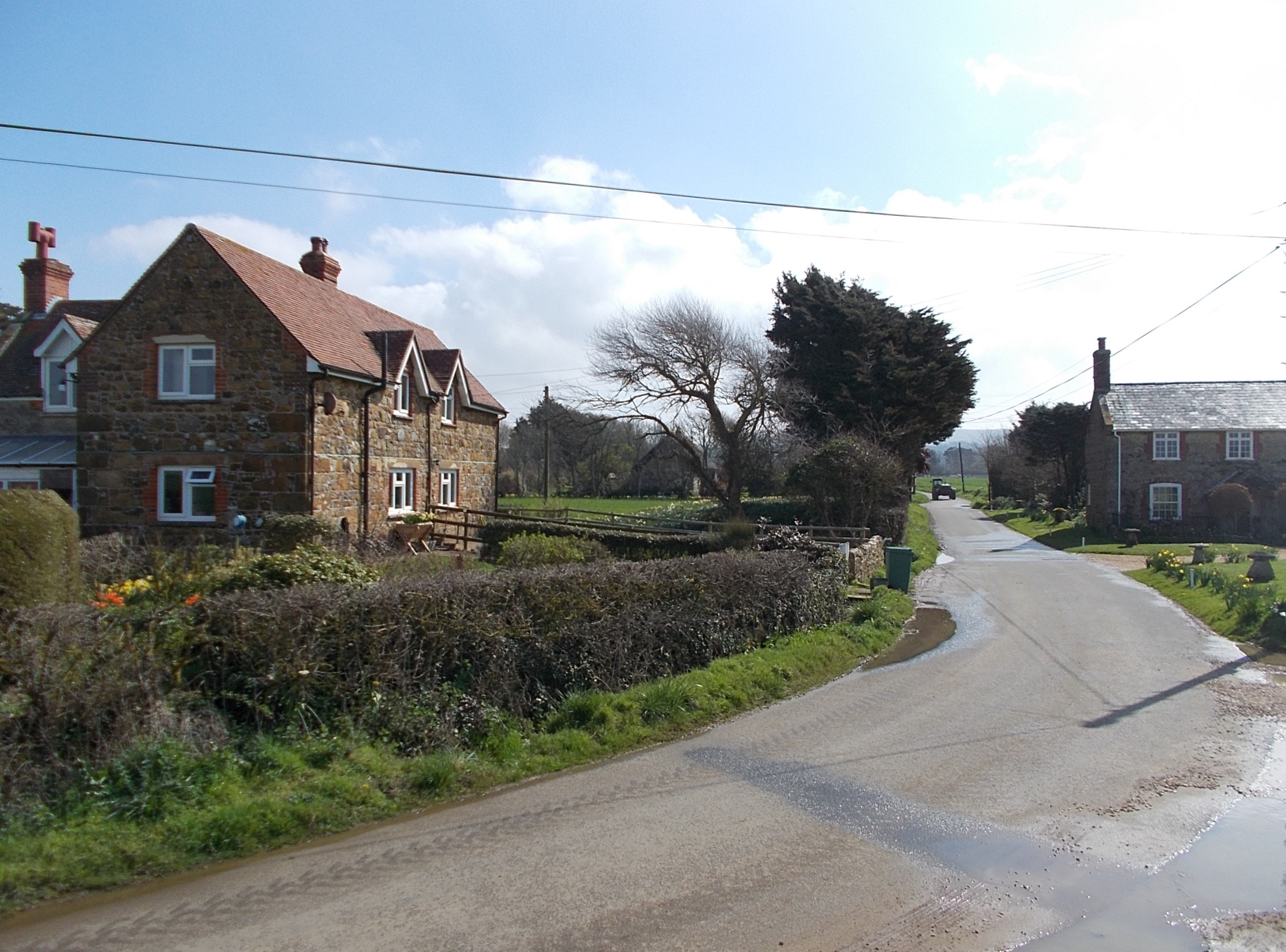
Atherfield Green

Atherfield is a rural location in the south west of the Isle of Wight, UK. It is set in largely open farmland and includes the small settlements of Atherfield Green and Little Atherfield, as well as several farms. To the south west it is bounded by the cliffs of Chale Bay and Brighstone Bay, which are divided by Atherfield Point. The south-eastern part of Brighstone Bay is also sometimes known as Atherfield Bay, and was the site of a former holiday camp, now demolished.

== Name ==
The name means 'the open land of the family or followers of a man called Ēadhere or Æthelhere', from Old English Ēadhere or Æthelhere (personal name), -inga- and feld. The 1086 spelling shows the influence on the name by the Normans.

959 (in a copy from ~1300): Aderingefelda

1086 (Domesday Book): Avrefel, Egrafel

1205: Atherefeld

1248: Adherfeld

1287: Atherfeld

== Geology ==
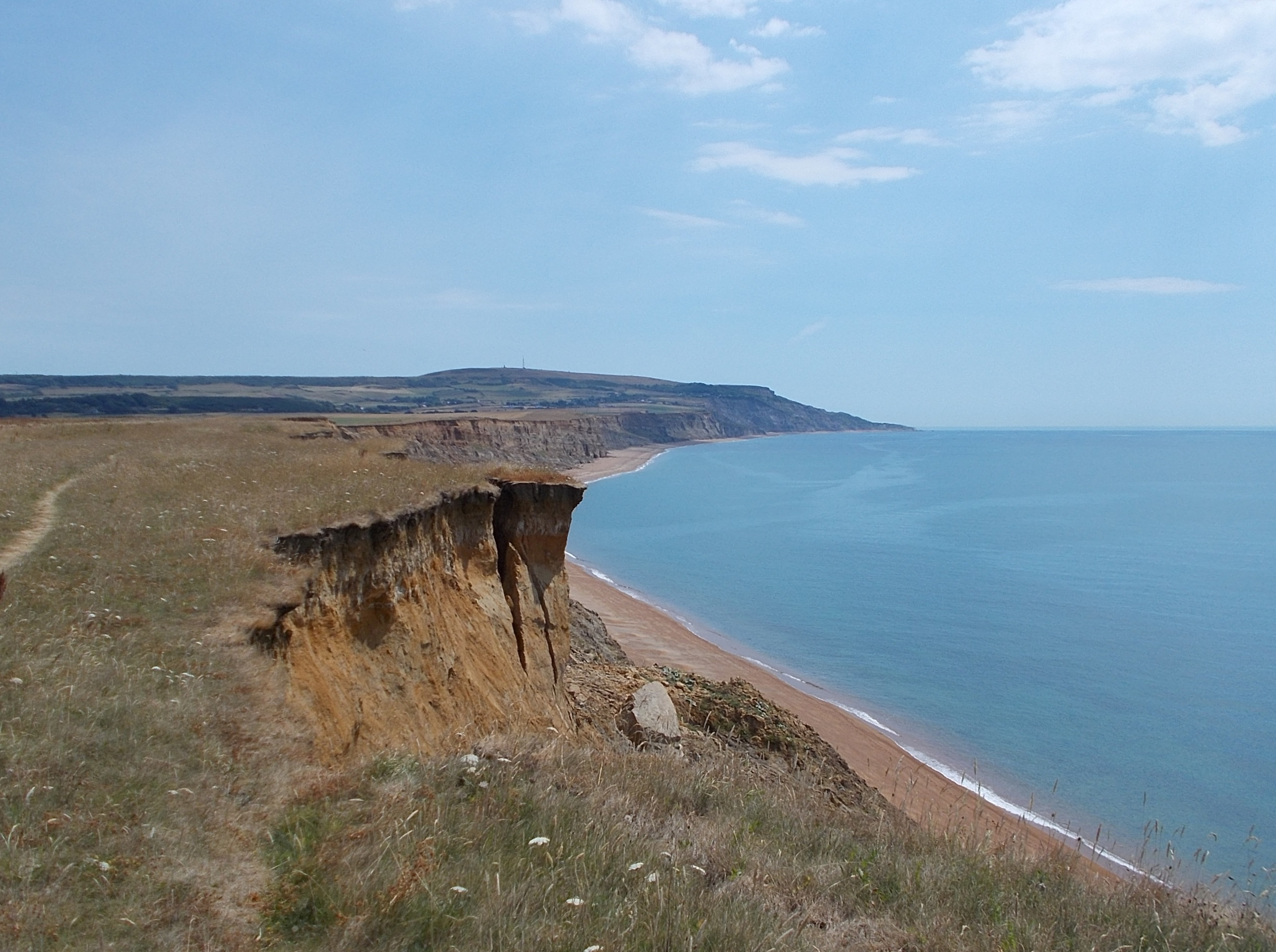
Coastal scenery at Atherfield

Atherfield Bay is one of the best sources of Cretaceous fossils, and is one of the places that gives the Wight the nickname "Dinosaur Isle" (see Dinosaurs of the Isle of Wight). The unique land formation on this coast means fossils up to 30 million years old are uncovered. The village serves as the namesake for a species of dinosaur, Mantellisaurus atherfieldensis, of which the species' holotype fossil was found in Atherfield.

The bay also marks the landward edge of the Atherfield Ledge, an underwater outcrop that has claimed many ships including the SS Eider and more. Shepherd's Chine is in Atherfield Bay.
