= Geology of the Isle of Wight =

Geology of English county

Geological map of the Isle of Wight

The geology of the Isle of Wight is dominated by sedimentary rocks of Cretaceous and Paleogene age. This sequence was affected by the late stages of the Alpine Orogeny, forming the Isle of Wight monocline, the cause of the steeply-dipping outcrops of the Chalk Group and overlying Paleogene strata seen at The Needles, Alum Bay and Whitecliff Bay.

The Isle of Wight exhibits considerable geological variety in a relatively small area, and has attracted interest from geologists from the early days of the science up until the present. The Island has been described as "one of the most significant of the classic areas of British geology" and "a 'mecca' for geological studies since the early 1800s".

== Pre-Cretaceous ==
Rocks of Devonian, Triassic and Jurassic age are present in the subsurface of the island, based on boreholes and interpreted seismic reflection profiles. Up to 389 m of presumed Devonian sedimentary rocks been proved by six boreholes drilled on the island, consisting of claystone, siltstone, sandstone and quartzite, similar in type to other dated Devonian sequences. A nearly full Triassic succession has been drilled, reaching a maximum thickness of 450 m. Sandstones of the Sherwood Sandstone Group are overlain by claystones and siltstones of the Mercia Mudstone Group and limestones of the Penarth Group. A complete Jurassic succession is shown by the boreholes at Arreton, reaching over 1400 m in thickness, comprising mainly mudstones of the Lias Group, oolitic limestones of the Inferior and Great Oolite Group, claystones of the Kellaways and Oxford Clay Formations, bioclastic limestones of the Corallian Group, organic-rich mudstones of the Kimmeridge Clay Formation, limestones of the Portland Group and the lower part of the Purbeck Group. The entire sequence presents sedimentation in a shallow water environment.

== Cretaceous ==
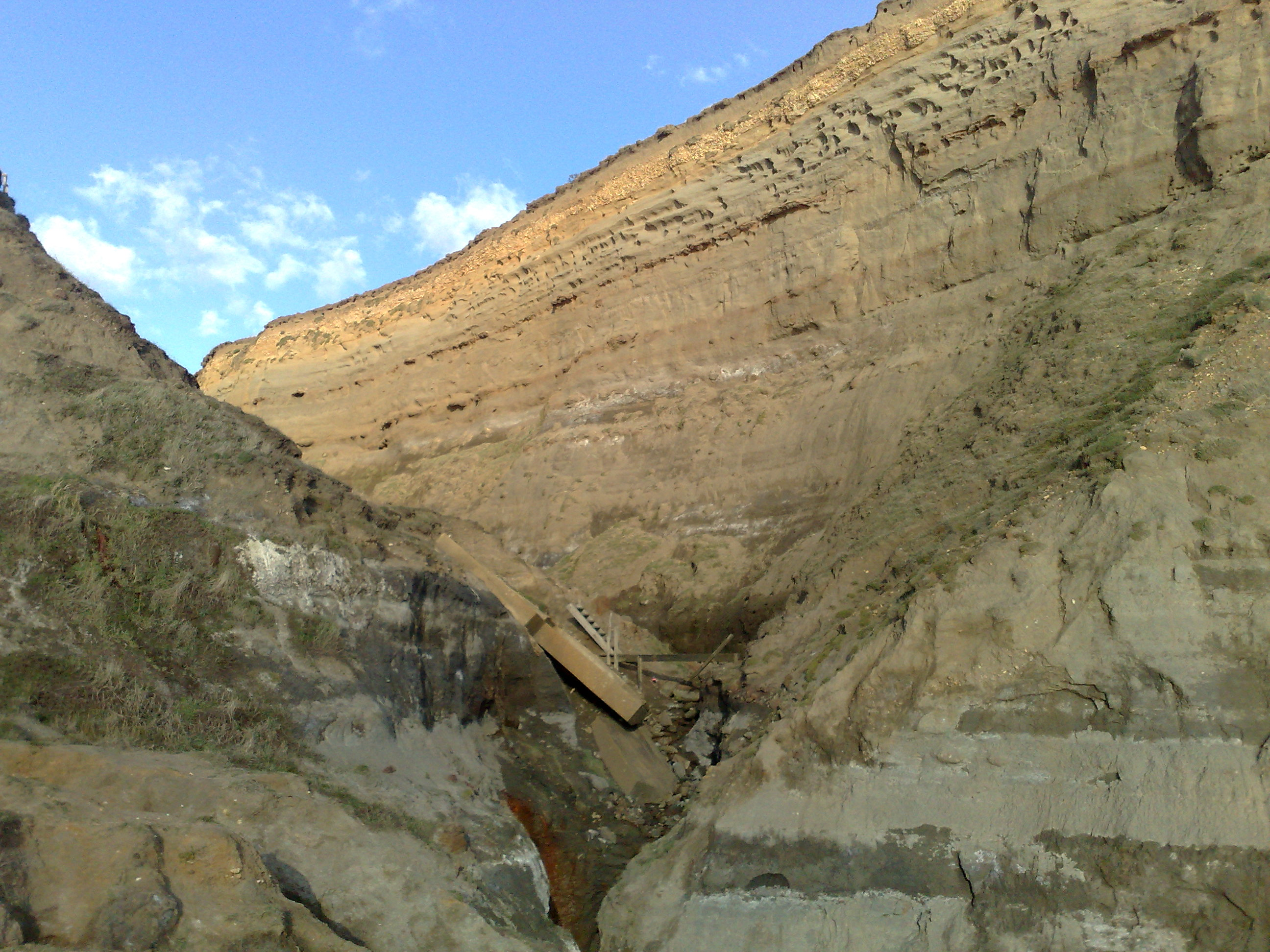
Ferruginous Sands Formation of the Lower Greensand Group exposed in the sides of Whale Chine

=== Wealden Group ===
A complete section is found in the subsurface, but only the upper part of the succession is exposed from Compton Bay to Brighstone Bay and at Sandown Bay, in the core of two broad anticlines. In the Arreton boreholes the Wealden Group reaches a total of 620 m. The exposed sequence comprises the upper part of the Wessex Formation and the overlying Vectis Formation. The Wessex Formation consists of red mudstones with some interbedded sandstones laid down in a freshwater and floodplain environment. The Vectis Formation consists of grey mudstones, deposited in a shallow water lacustrine to lagoonal setting, with some evidence of marine influence. The type section for the formation is in Brighstone Bay.

=== Lower Greensand Group ===
The Lower Greensand Group marks the return to fully marine conditions in this area.

=== Selborne Group ===
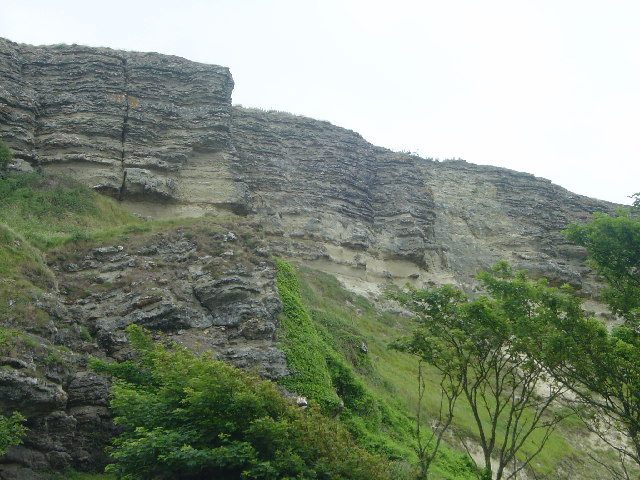
Sandstones of the Upper Greensand Formation above Blackgang

The Selborne Group comprises claystones of the Gault Formation and sandstones of the overlying Upper Greensand Formation.

=== Chalk Group ===
The Chalk Group consists of a sequence of chalky limestones with some interbedded marls. The age of the sequence ranges from Cenomanian through to Campanian, The upper boundary is an unconformity across which rocks of Maastrichtian to Paleocene age are missing.

== Palaeogene ==
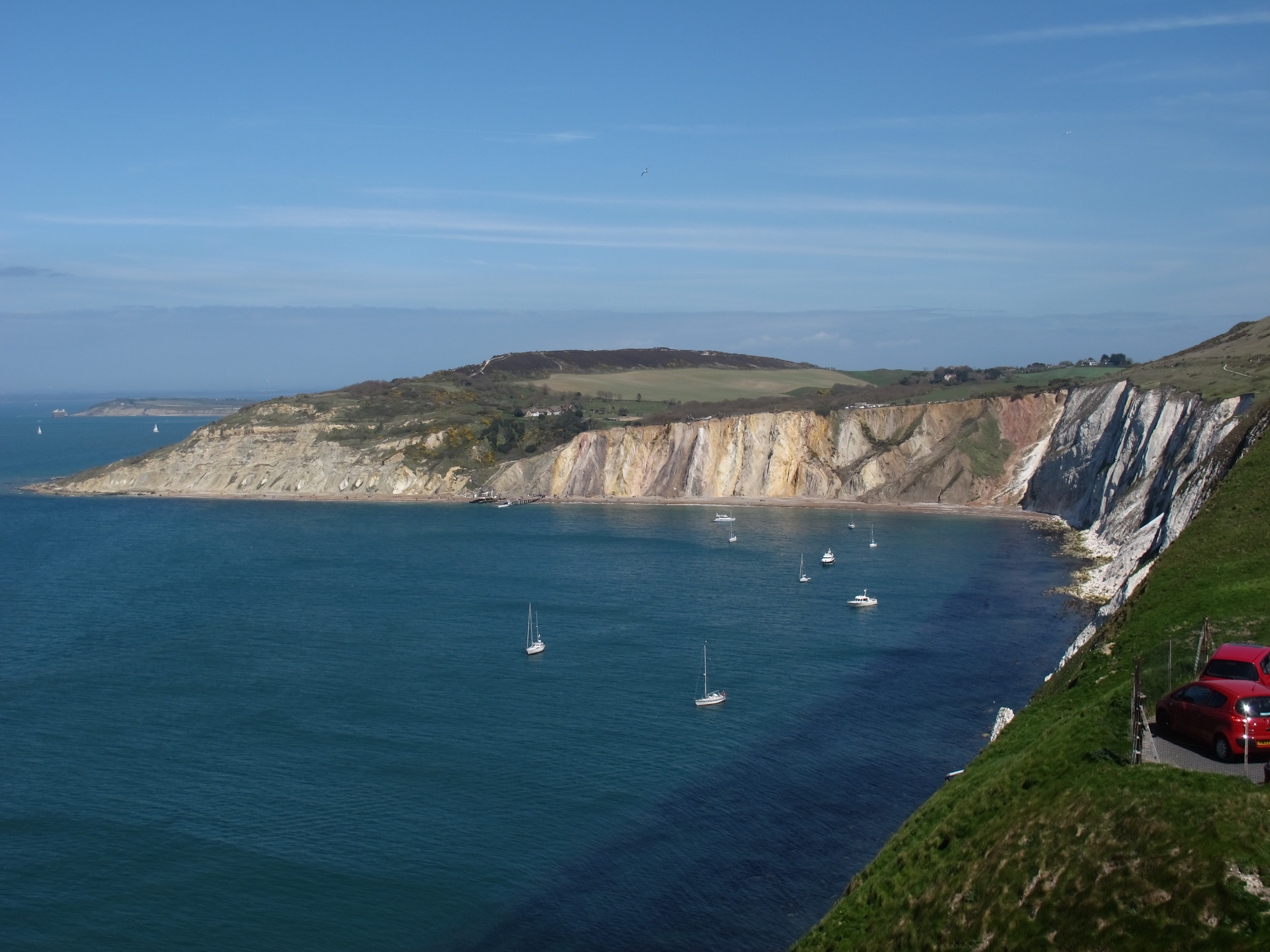
The cliffs of Alum Bay showing the almost complete Palaeogene section on the Isle of Wight. The monoclinal nature of the structure is shown by the decrease in dip towards the north

Rocks of Palaeogene age rest unconformably on the Upper Cretaceous sequence on the Isle of Wight. Most of the Palaeocene is missing, in common with all of onshore UK. The Palaeogene strata were deposited in a shallow water marine environment, which was affected by repeated changes in relative sea level, causing cycles of transgression and regression.

=== Lambeth Group ===
The Lambeth Group is well exposed at the southern end of Alum Bay and Whitecliff Bay at the western and eastern ends of the island. This Thanetian (Upper Palaeocene) sequence is represented by the Reading Formation, a thin sequence of mainly claystones with variable amounts of sands, varying from 25 – 40 m in thickness.

=== Thames Group ===
On the Isle of Wight this group comprises the Ypresian (lowermost Eocene) London Clay Formation, which reaches up to 160 m in thickness. The formation is a sequence of mainly claystones, although to the east of the island the formation contains sandstones of the Whitecliff and Portsmouth Sand Members.

=== Bracklesham Group ===
The Bracklesham Group is of Ypresian to Lutetian in age. Its type section is along the cliffs in Whitecliff Bay.

=== Barton Group ===
This sequence is of Lutetian to Priabonian (uppermost Eocene) in age. It comprises a mixture of clays, fine sands, sandy clays and clayey sands. The stratigraphy exposed at the two ends of the island are somewhat different.

=== Solent Group ===
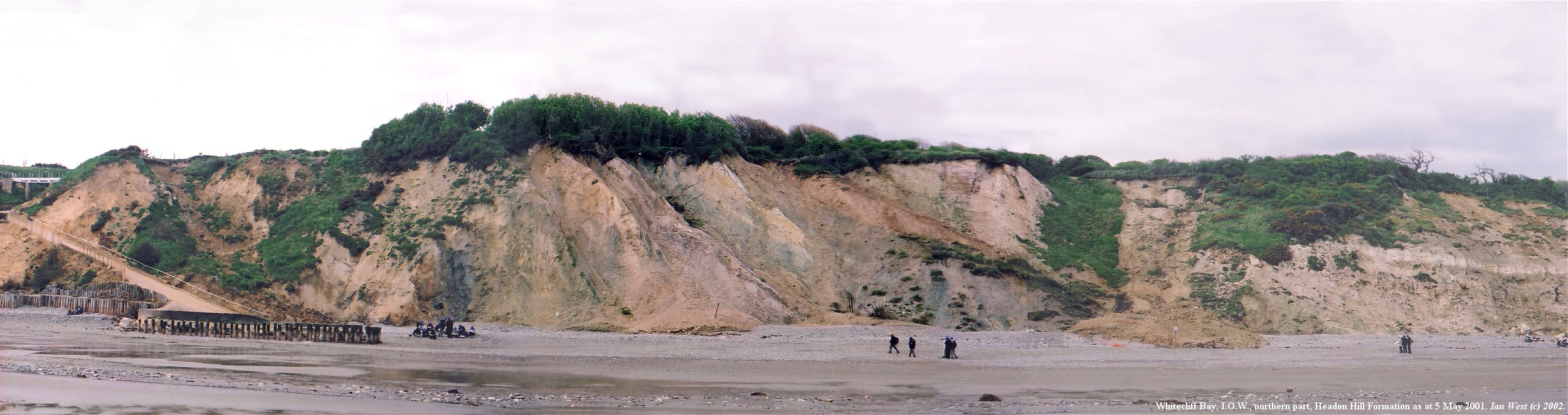
The Headon Formation with Bembridge Limestone Formation to the right and the upper part of the Barton Group to the left in the cliffs of Whitecliff Bay

The Solent Group is Priabonian to Rupelian (early Oligocene) in age. It comprises the Headon Formation, the Bembridge Limestone Formation and the Bouldnor Formation.

== Quaternary ==
The outcrops of Quaternary age are relatively poorly understood.

== Structure ==
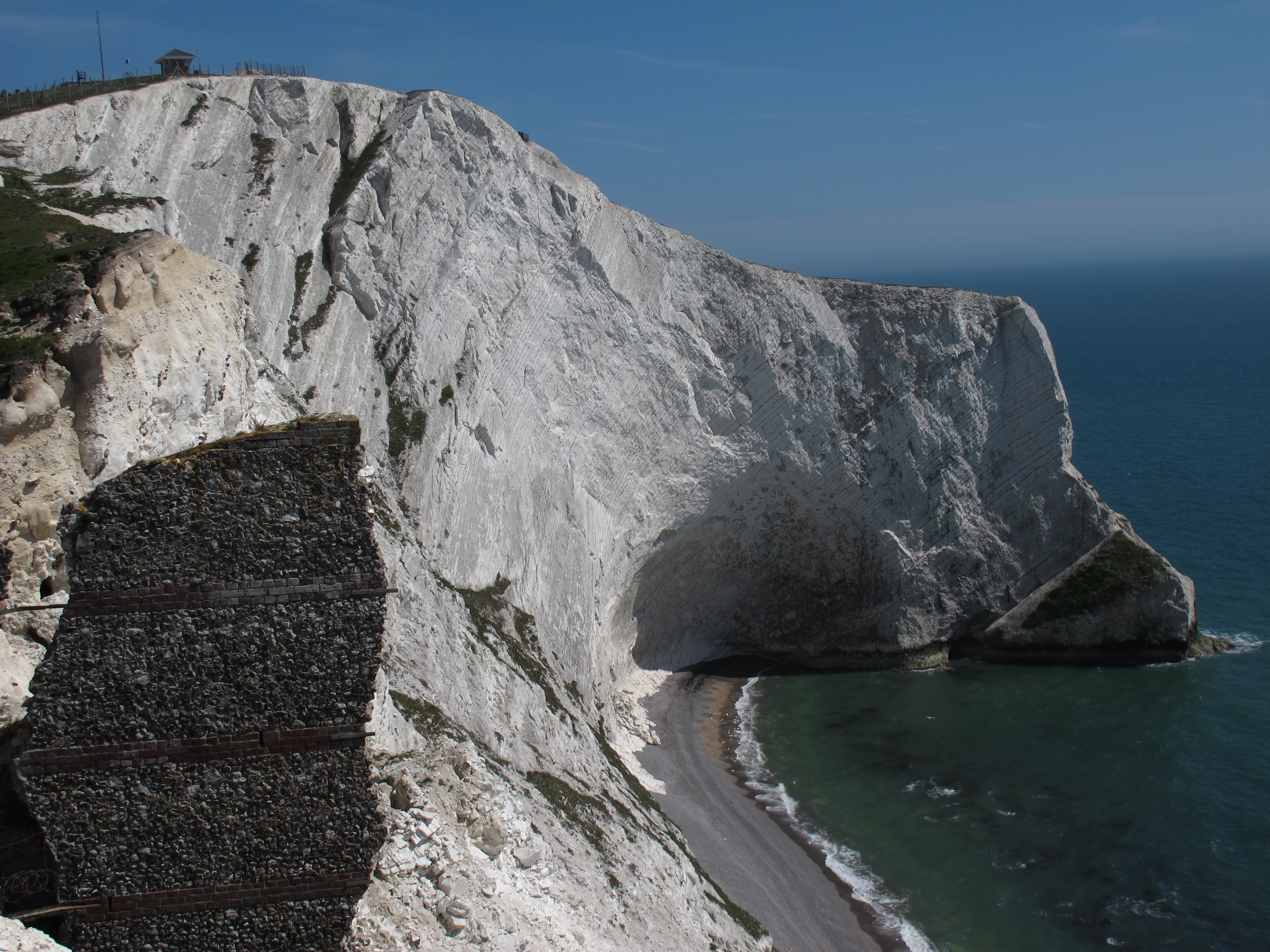
Scratchell's Bay showing northward increase in dip towards the Isle of Wight monocline

Deposition of the Triassic, Jurassic and lowermost Cretaceous sequences was controlled by two large west–east trending, south-dipping normal faults, the Needles Fault and the Sandown Fault, which have an overlapping en-echelon geometry. Reactivation of these faults over part of their lengths during the Paleogene inversion event produced the structures that control the current outcrop patterns.

The two main structures are the Brighstone and Sandown Anticlines, which relate to reactivation of the Needles and Sandown Faults respectively. These anticlines have steep, locally vertical northern limbs, forming the monoclinal structures seen at The Needles, Alum Bay and Whitecliff Bay. In the centre of the island the shortening is transferred between the fault zones, forming the zone of lower dips and north–south strike between Calbourne and Garston's Down. To the north of the monoclines the Paleogene sequence is deformed into a gentle syncline, the Bouldnor Syncline.
