= Hartlepool Lifeboat Station =

RNLI station in County Durham, England

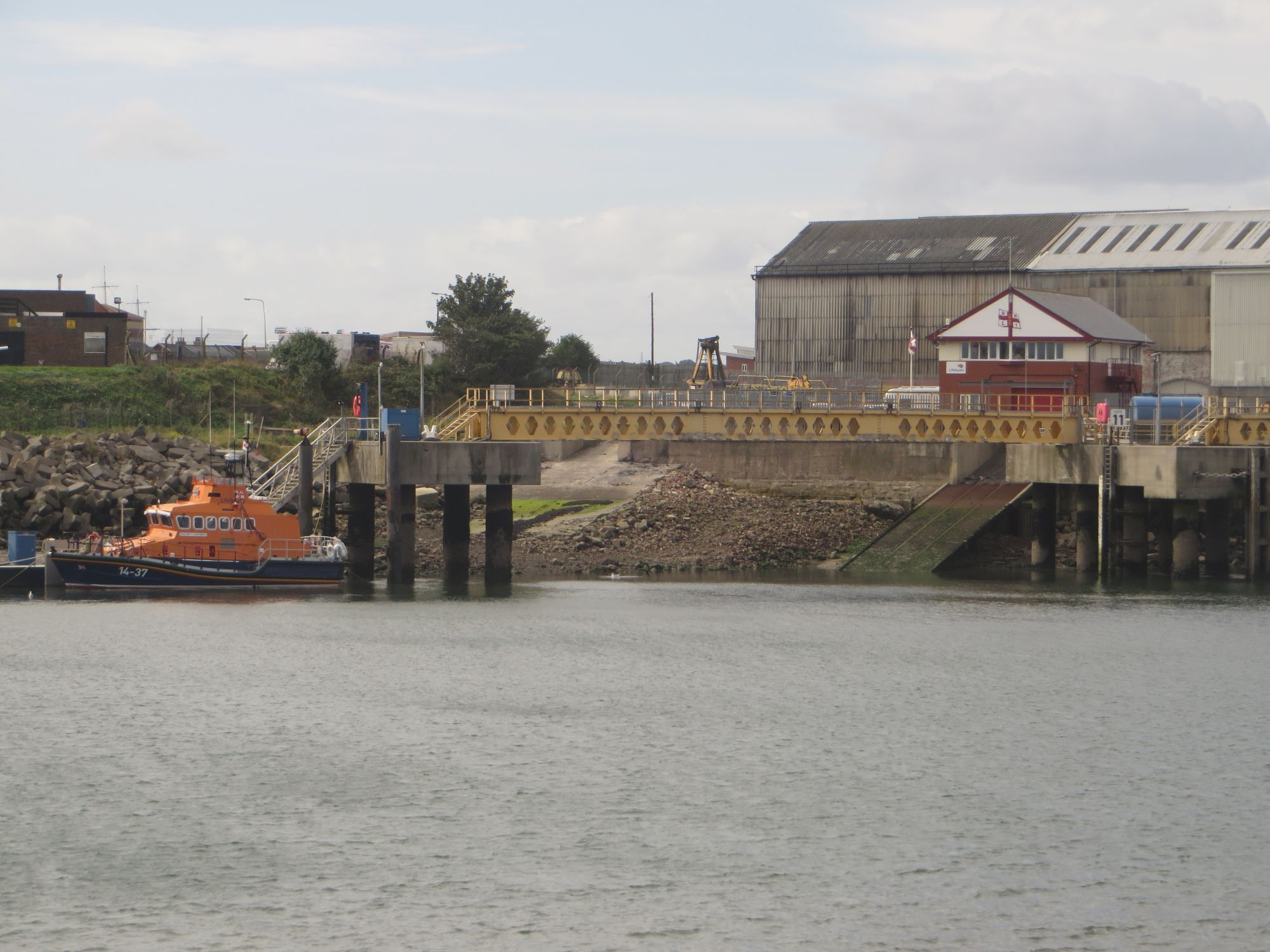
- Hartlepool Lifeboat Station

- Location within County Durham

General information
- Type: RNLI station
- Location: The Boathouse, Ferry Road, Middleton, Hartlepool, County Durham, England
- Coordinates: 54°41′41.5″N 1°11′27.8″W
- Opened: 1803 Local Committee; 1875 RNLI
- Owner: Royal National Lifeboat Institution

Website
- rnli.org/find-my-nearest/lifeboat-stations/hartlepool-lifeboat-station

Hartlepool Lifeboat Station is located at Middleton, next to the port town of Hartlepool, in County Durham, England.

A lifeboat was first stationed at Hartlepool in 1803 by the Hartlepool Lifeboat Committee. Management of the station was transferred to the RNLI in February 1875.

The station currently operates an Shannon-class All-weather lifeboat, 13-54 John Sharp (ON 1361), on station since 2025, and a B-class (Atlantic 85) Solihull (B-881), on station since 2015.

== History ==
On 5 August 1802, the Castle Eden public house was the venue of the first meeting of the local gentry and clergy, to discuss the provision of a lifeboat for Hartlepool. It was later resolved that boatbuilder Geo. Hunter be commissioned to provide a lifeboat, boathouse and carriage, and that the lifeboat be placed at the Harbour station near the Watergate on Fish Sands. Subscribers were invited to help fund the lifeboat, and £350 was received from Lloyd's of London. On 15 February, it was reported that a 27-foot-3-inch (8.31 m) lifeboat, built to the design of Henry Greathead, had been placed on station at the Watergate boathouse.

The lifeboat was called upon regularly. On 28 January 1815, as reported in the Durham Chronicle, the Betsy of Monkwearmouth was driven ashore 550 m (600 yards) offshore at Seaton Carew, 3 miles (4.8 km) to the south of Hartlepool. The lifeboat was summoned and was transported to the scene by carriage in just one hour. Setting out in violent conditions, eight of the nine men aboard the vessel were rescued and brought ashore. One man was left clinging to the rigging. A fresh lifeboat crew then set out once more, and managed to rescue the one remaining man, only moments before the vessel broke up.

The Tees Bay Lifeboat and Shipwreck Society (TBLSS) was founded in 1823, and in 1836, they provided a new lifeboat for Hartlepool. The 27-foot-3-inch lifeboat 'pulling and sailing' (P&S) lifeboat, one with oars and sails, was constructed by William Wake of Monkwearmouth, and replaced the 1803 boat. It was stationed at the Old Pier and hung on davits.

The TBLSS provided Hartlepool with a second lifeboat in 1841. A boathouse was constructed on the North Sands, at the high water mark on Hart Warren, north of the Hartlepool Cemetery, and a 30-foot (9.1 m) (P&S) lifeboat was constructed by John Cambridge of Hartlepool. Both lifeboats were funded by a levy placed on shipping passing the Old Pier. In 1847, the Hartlepool Lifeboat Society took over from the TBLSS.

A meeting was held at the Hartlepool Seamen's Society Reading Room in 1854. Various regulations prevented anyone but Pilots from joining the lifeboat crews, and it was felt there was a need for an additional lifeboat, to be crewed by local seamen. A 20-foot (6.1 m) self-righting lifeboat was commissioned with Mr. Hawksworth of Torquay, to a design by James Peake, and the Royal National Institution for the Preservation of Life from Shipwreck (RNIPLS) donated £10, and a set of life-belts. Work began in August 1856 to construct a boathouse, 36 by 16 feet (11.0 by 4.9 m), at the top end of the Old (or Tide) Harbour (now the deep-water berth), costing £150, and completed by 1 October.

On 18 October 1854, the Seamen's Society lifeboat rescued the seven man crew of the schooner Prospect, which was driven ashore whilst on passage from Aberdeen.

Also in October 1854, a new 28-foot (8.5 m) ten-oared self-righting lifeboat was constructed by William Robinson of Hartlepool. It was placed at North Sands station, with the existing lifeboat being transferred to the Old Pier station. A second new boat, a 31-foot (9.4 m) 12-oared lifeboat, built by Pounder and Wilkinson of Hartlepool, was completed in August 1858. This was placed in a shed at the top of the Old Harbour, next to the Seamen's lifeboat house.

In 1870, it was requested by the Hartlepool Port and Harbour Commission, that the lifeboat stationed at the Old Pier be relocated, as it was required for landing building materials to be used for the New Pier extension. The Old Pier lifeboat was relocated to the shed at the top of the Old Harbour.

On 25 February 1875, Hartlepool Lifeboat Society handed over the management of their stations and lifeboats to the RNLI, along with just over £100 in assets. Just two days later, the Hartlepool Board of Trade confirmed it would no longer support the extra Seamen's lifeboat, and it was to be sold.

It was decided that the North Sands lifeboat would be Hartlepool No.1, and the two lifeboats located at the Old Harbour station would be Hartlepool No.2 and No.3 respectively. The RNLI set out their intentions to replace the No.2 lifeboat, and to replace the lifeboat shed for the No.2 and No.3 lifeboats with a new boathouse and slipway. They would also supply a new No.1 lifeboat at North Sands, along with a new boathouse and slipway. Both boathouses were constructed within the year, each costing £340. The North Sands boathouse was relocated to the south side of Hartlepool Cemetery.

In 1881, the North Eastern Railway notified the RNLI that they wished to redevelop the area where the lifeboat shed was located, at the top end of the Old Harbour, to create a deep-water port A new site was provided at the mouth of the Old Harbour at Middleton by the Hartlepool Port and Harbour Commissioners, and a new twin boathouse was constructed by Messrs. Bridges and Robson at a cost of £320. A slipway was added in 1883.

By December 1914, the First World War was just over four months old. At 08:05 on 16 December 1914, after having identified Hartlepool as a poorly defended area, but with a considerable number of shipyards and engine works supplying the war effort, three German battleships, Blucher, Seydlitz and Moltke, bombarded the town for 40 minutes, before making their escape in the fog. 127 people were killed. The No.1 lifeboat station at North Sands was badly damaged, and in 1915, the station was closed. The lifeboat on station, Ilminster (ON 242), was transferred to the No.2 Station.

The first motor-powered lifeboat was placed at Hartlepool in 1924. The 80-hp Elizabeth Newton (ON 679) was a 45-foot Watson-class lifeboat, funded from the bequest of the late B. Newton of Darlington, and replaced the No.3 lifeboat Horatio Brand (ON 520). The No.2 lifeboat Gem (ON 568) was withdrawn to the relief fleet, effectively closing the No.2 station. From this point forward, the No.3 station became Hartlepool Lifeboat Station.

Despite much local protest, the All-weather lifeboat was withdrawn in 1968. It was felt that the area had sufficient All-weather lifeboat cover, and that a fast small inshore lifeboat was more suited to the station. Later, with increased port traffic, it was decided to reinstate the All-weather lifeboat, and the Waveney-class lifeboat 44-018 The Scout (ON 1044) was placed on service in 1977.

In 1991, again due to developments in the docks area, the lifeboat station was moved approx.50 yards (46 m), with a new station building constructed. This would incorporate housing for the Atlantic 21-class Inshore lifeboat also now on station.

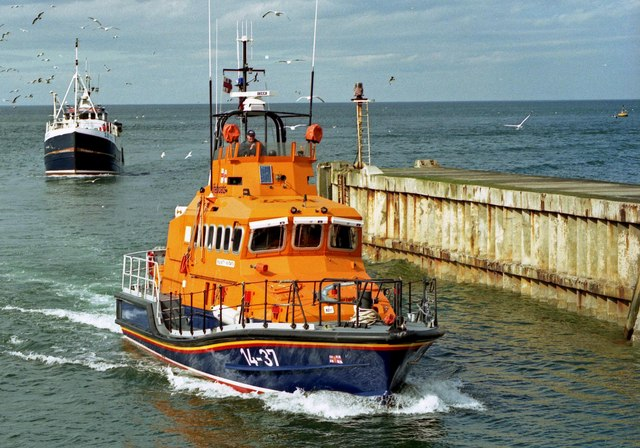
Hartlepool Trent-class lifeboat 14-37 Betty Huntbatch (ON 1274)

44-018 The Scout (ON 1044) served at Hartlepool for 22 years until 1997. Over the following seven years, a further three lifeboats, with previous service elsewhere, were placed at Hartlepool. In 2004, Hartlepool then received the new Trent-class lifeboat, 14-37 Betty Huntbatch (ON 1274), named after the donor. "Betty" would serve at Hartlepool for a further 20 years.

In 2024, it was announced that Betty Huntbatch was to be replaced with a new Shannon-class lifeboat. After a period of training, 13-54 John Sharp (ON 1361) formally entered service on 24 February 2025. An official naming ceremony was held on Saturday 5 July 2025. The funding of the Shannon class lifeboat was from a gift left to the Charities Aid Foundation by the late John Sharp, a successful mathematician, and highly skilled and active investor, who died in 2019. The lifeboat was named by his brother, Anthony Sharp.

=== Notable rescues ===
Hartlepool's 46-foot Watson-class lifeboat The Princess Royal (Civil Service No.7) was launched at 07:35 on 26 January 1942 into an easterly gale and rough seas, to the steamship Hawkwood, with a crew of 23, which had run aground 0.5 miles (0.80 km) north of the Tees North Gare jetty, and broken in two. Whilst only 3 miles (4.8 km) away from Hartlepool in a direct line, the lifeboat had much further to travel due to the various wartime defences along the coast. The lifeboat arrived on scene at 08:30, but with the water too shallow to approach, and nobody in immediate danger, it returned to base, to try again later.

Returning to the vessel at 12:15, and with great skill and seamanship, the lifeboat was brought alongside. Five men were recovered from one half of the vessel, and landed back at Hartlepool. Setting out a third time, the lifeboat reached the vessel at 15:15, but was still unable to rescue the remaining 18 crew. After returning to base once more, with the intention of setting out for a fourth time later, it was reported that all 18 had been recovered with the use of rocket lines. A silver medal and six bronze medals were awarded to the crew for this service. The coxswain of the lifeboat, Lt. William Henry Bennison was awarded the RNLI Gold Medal.

== Station honours ==
The following are awards made at Hartlepool.

- RNLI Gold Medal

Lt. William Henry Bennison, Coxswain – 1942

- RNIPLS Silver Medal

George Grey, Farm Servant – 1826

- RNLI Silver Medal

Henry Houghton, Joiner – 1857

Thomas Dawson, Steam Tug Owner – 1869

Thomas William Rowntree, Coxswain – 1903

Shepherd Sotheran, Coxswain Superintendent – 1907

Herbert William Jefferson, Mechanic – 1942

- RNLI Bronze Medal

Robert Hood, Coxswain – 1930

Thomas Gilchrist, Bowman – 1942
Robert Horsley, Asst. Mechanic – 1942
Edward Wallace, Emergency Mechanic – 1942
Richard Coulson, crew member – 1942
William Horsley, crew member – 1942
Herbert Pearson, crew member – 1942

Douglas Gibbin, crew member – 1973

Robert Maiden, Coxswain – 1986

- The Thanks of the Institution inscribed on Vellum

Herbert William Jefferson, Station Mechanic – 1927

Douglas Gibbin, Helm – 1970

Michael O'Connor, Helm – 1973
Ian Holdsworth, crew member – 1973

- A Collective Letter of Thanks signed by the Chairman of the Institution

Eric Reeve, Coxswain – 1993
Ian Gilbraith, Mechanic – 1993
Thomas Price, Assistant Mechanic – 1993
Ian Maiden, crew member – 1993
Robert Maiden, crew member – 1993
Gary Jamieson, crew member – 1993
Richard Dougherty, crew member – 1993
Peter Lamb, crew member – 1993

- Monetary awards, from the Emperor of Germany

The crew of the No.3 lifeboat – 1902

- Honorary Freedom of the Borough of Hartlepool

Hartlepool Lifeboat Crew – 1986

== Roll of honour ==
In memory of those lost whilst serving Hartlepool lifeboats:

- Died on 11 January 1959 after an operation, following injury received whilst rehousing the lifeboat The Princess Royal (Civil Service No.7), 5 December 1958.

Thomas Kennedy, Head Launcher (52)

== Hartlepool lifeboats ==
=== Hartlepool Harbour (Watergate) ===
54°41′41.1″N 1°11′01.9″W

Name	Built	On station	Type	Comments
Unnamed	1802	1803–1836	27-foot 3in North Country	(Note: 27-foot 3in x 9-foot 9in North Country non-self-righting lifeboat, built by Geo. Hunter of Hartlepool.)

Old Pier Station closed, 1836

=== Hartlepool Harbour (Old Pier) ===
54°41′36.5″N 1°11′03.6″W

ON (Note: ON is the RNLI's Official Number of the boat.)	Name	Built	On station	Type	Comments
–	Unnamed	1836	1836–1854	27-foot 3in North Country	(Note: 27-foot 3in x 9-foot 9in (12-oared) North Country non-self-righting lifeboat, built by William Wake of Monkwearmouth.)
Pre-199	Unnamed	1841	1854–1870	30-foot North Country	(Note: 30-foot x 10-foot (14-oared) North Country non-self-righting lifeboat, constructed by John Cambridge of Hartlepool, costing £165.); Transferred to Old Harbour Station in 1870

Old Pier Station closed, 1870

=== Hartlepool North Sands ===
54°42′53.5″N 1°13′35.1″W

ON	Name	Built	On station	Type	Comments
Pre-199	Unnamed	1841	1841–1854	30-foot North Country	(Note: 30-foot x 10-foot (14-oared) North Country non-self-righting lifeboat, constructed by John Cambridge of Hartlepool, costing £165.); Transferred to Harbour (Old Pier) Station in 1854.
–	Unnamed	1854	1854–1876	28-foot North Country	(Note: 28-foot x 8-foot (10-oared) North Country non-self-righting lifeboat, built by William Robinson of Hartlepool.)

Station Relocated, 1876

=== Hartlepool Old Harbour (Seaman's Lifeboat) ===
54°41′51.3″N 1°11′52.7″W

Name	Built	On Station	Type	Comments
Mary Ann or Hartlepool	1854	1854–1875	20-foot Peake-type Self-righting.	(Note: 20-foot x 8-foot (10-oared) Peake-type self-righting lifeboat, constructed by Hawksworth of Torquay, costing £200.)

Station Closed, 1875

=== Hartlepool No.1 North Sands (from 1876) ===
54°42′18.7″N 1°12′12.5″W

ON	Name	Built	On station	Type	Comments
Pre-594	Charles Mather	1875	1876–1889	33-foot Self-righting (P&S)	(Note: 33-foot x 8-foot 6in (10-oared) self-righting (P&S) lifeboat, gift of Mrs A Mather, of Longridge House, Northumberland, built by Forrestt of Limehouse, London, costing £324.)
242	Ilminster	1889	1889–1915	34-foot Self-righting (P&S)	(Note: 34-foot x 8-foot (10-oared) self-righting (P&S) lifeboat, legacy of Mr G. Lovibond of Ilminster, built by D. and W. Henderson and Company of Partick, costing £450.); Transferred to Hartlepool No.2 in 1915

Station Closed 1915

=== Hartlepool No.2 Old Harbour (from 1876) ===
54°41′51.3″N 1°11′52.7″W

ON	Name	Built	On station	Type	Comments
Pre-199	Unnamed	1841	1870–1876	30-foot North Country	(Note: 30-foot x 10-foot (14-oared) North Country non-self-righting lifeboat, constructed by John Cambridge of Hartlepool, costing £165.)
Pre-599	Charles Ingleby	1875	1876–1887	35-foot Self-righting (P&S)	(Note: 35-foot x 9-foot (10-oared) self-righting (P&S) lifeboat, gift of the Charles Ingleby LB Fund via Mr J. F. Wragge of Birmingham, built by Forrestt of Limehouse, London, costing £389.)
131	Charles Ingleby	1887	1887–1915	34-foot Self-righting (P&S)	(Note: 34-foot x 8-foot (10-oared) self-righting (P&S) lifeboat, built by Edwards and Symes of Millwall, costing £445.); Lifeboat placed at Seaton Carew between 1906 and 1908.
242	Ilminster	1889	1915–1916	34-foot Self-righting (P&S)	Previously at Hartlepool No.1
568	Gem	1906	1916–1924	35-foot Self-righting (P&S)	(Note: 35-foot x 8-foot 6in (10-oared) self-righting (P&S) lifeboat, gift of Mrs G. W. Moss of Aigburth, built by Thames Ironworks of Blackwall, London, costing £831.); Previously at Atherfield.

Station Closed 1924

=== Hartlepool No.3 Old Harbour (from 1876) ===
54°41′51.3″N 1°11′52.7″W

ON	Name	Built	On station	Type	Comments
Pre-320	Unnamed	1858	1858–1878	31-foot 4in North Country	(Note: 31-foot 4in x 9-foot (12-oared) North Country lifeboat, funded by Shipping Tolls, constructed by William Robinson of Hartlepool.)
Pre-630	John Clay Barlow	1878	1878–1887	33-foot Self-righting (P&S)	(Note: 33-foot x 8-foot 6in (10-oared) self-righting (P&S) lifeboat, legacy of Miss S. Barlow of Leicester, built by Woolfe of Shadwell, London, costing £331)
125	Cyclist	1887	1887–1902	34-foot Self-righting (P&S)	(Note: 34-foot x 8-foot (10-oared) self-righting (P&S) lifeboat, funded from the 'Cyclist' LB fund via the editor, built by Forrestt of Limehouse, London, costing £450.)
127	Speedwell	1887	1903–1903	34-foot Self-righting (P&S)	(Note: 34-foot x 8-foot (10-oared) self-righting (P&S) lifeboat, gift of Miss J. Houghton of Roehampton, built by Forrestt of Limehouse, London, costing £480 when new.); Previously at Porthcawl
520	Horatio Brand	1903	1903–1924	35-foot Self-righting (P&S)	(Note: 35-foot x 8-foot 6in (10-oared) self-righting (P&S) lifeboat, gift of Maj. G. H. Brand of London, built by Thames Ironworks of Blackwall, London, costing £794.)

Pre ON numbers are unofficial numbers used by the Lifeboat Enthusiast Society to reference early lifeboats not included on the official RNLI list.

=== Motor lifeboats ===
ON	Op. No. (Note: Op. No. is the RNLI's Operational Number of the boat carried on the hull.)	Name	Built	On station	Type	Comments
679	–	Elizabeth Newton	1923	1924–1939	45-foot Watson	
828	–	The Princess Royal (Civil Service No.7)	1939	1939–1968	46-foot Watson	
All-weather lifeboat withdrawn 1968–1977
1044	44-018	The Scout	1976	1977–1997	Waveney	
1131	47-023	City of Sheffield	1988	1997–2000	Tyne	Previously at Whitby
1106	52-32	Keith Anderson	1985	2000–2003	Arun	Previously at Newhaven
1160	52-46	Duke of Atholl	1990	2003–2004	Arun	Previously at Weymouth
1274	14-37	Betty Huntbatch	2003	2004–2025	Trent	
1361	13-54	John Sharp	2024	2025–	Shannon	

=== Inshore lifeboats ===
==== D-class ====
Op. No.	Name	On station	Type	Comments
D-166	Unnamed	1967–1972	D-class (RFD PB16)	
D-152	Unnamed	1973	D-class (RFD PB16)	

==== B-class ====
Op. No.	Name	On station	Type	Comments
B-503	Unnamed	1972–1975	B-class (Atlantic 21)	
B-535	R. A. O. B.	1975–1976	B-class (Atlantic 21)	
B-532	Guide Friendship III	1976–1986	B-class (Atlantic 21)	
B-568	Burton Brewer	1986–2000	B-class (Atlantic 21)	
B-766	BBC Radio Cleveland	2000–2015	B-class (Atlantic 75)	
B-881	Solihull	2015–	B-class (Atlantic 85)	

== See also ==
- List of RNLI stations
- List of former RNLI stations
- Royal National Lifeboat Institution lifeboats
