= Russian merchant cruiser Ural =

Russian merchant cruiser

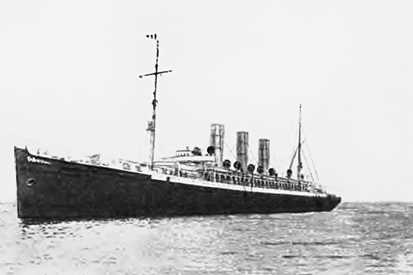
- As Ural

History
- Name: Spree (1890–1899); Kaiserin Maria Theresia (1899–1904); Ural (1904–1905)
- Owner: Norddeutscher Lloyd (1890–1904); Imperial Russian Navy (1904–1905)
- Builder: AG Vulcan, Stettin
- Launched: 17 May 1890
- Fate: Sunk on 27 May 1905

General characteristics
- Class & type: Rivers-class ocean liner; Auxiliary cruiser
- Tonnage: 6,963 GRT (as built); 7,840 GRT (after 1899)
- Length: 463 ft (141 m) (as built); 526 ft (160 m) (after 1899)
- Beam: 51.8 ft (15.8 m) (as built)
- Propulsion: By 1904: 2 × triple expansion engine; 2 screws; dual shaft; 3 funnels; two masts
- Speed: 18 kn (21 mph) (as built); 20 kn (23 mph) (after 1899)
- Armament: 2 single 8-inch (203 mm)/22 guns; 4 single 6-inch (152 mm)/23 guns; 2 single 3.4-inch (86.4 mm) guns

Ural was an auxiliary cruiser of the Imperial Russian Navy during the Russo-Japanese War. She was originally a Rivers-class ocean liner for Norddeutscher Lloyd, launched in 1890 under the name Spree. She was renamed Kaiserin Maria Theresia in 1899, before being sold to the Russians in 1904.

== Commercial service ==
Built in 1890 as Spree for Norddeutscher Lloyd of Bremen by the AG Vulcan shipyard of Stettin, Germany, she was 6,963 gross register tons (GRT) with a length of 463 ft (141 m) and a beam of 51.8 ft (15.8 m) and a speed of 18 knots (33 km/h; 21 mph). She had two funnels, three masts, and a single screw, with accommodation for 244 first-class, 122 second-class and 460 third-class passengers. She made her maiden voyage leaving Bremen for New York on 11 October 1890. She would continue to ply this route for eight years.

Whilst heading west across the Atlantic in November 1892, Spree's main propeller shaft broke and made a hole in the stern. There was considerable panic amongst the passengers until it became clear that the ship's watertight compartments would keep it afloat. Two days later, the steamship Lake Huron was sighted and was able to tow Spree back to Ireland. There was only one casualty in the incident: a man who threw himself overboard and was drowned. The event was memorialized in a poem by William McGonagall.

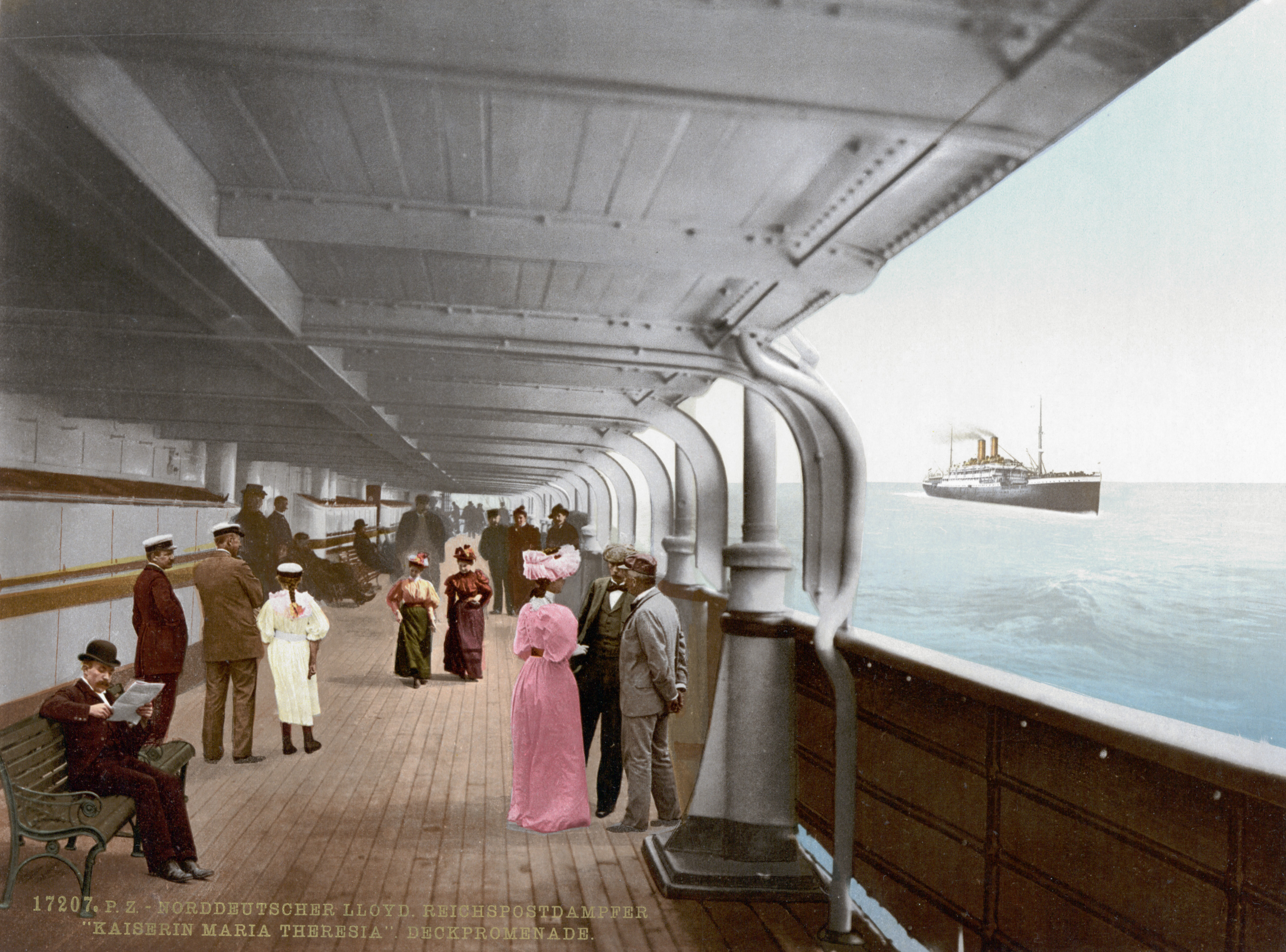
Colourised postcard view of the promenade deck of Kaiserin Maria Theresia

In 1899 she was completely rebuilt by AG Vulcan. She was lengthened to 526 ft (160 m), her tonnage increased to 7,840 GRT, new engines were fitted joined to twin screws to give a speed of 20 knots (37 km/h; 23 mph). The number of funnels was increased to three, though she was reduced to two masts. Her accommodation was altered to carry 405 first-class, 114 second-class and 387 third-class passengers, and she was renamed Kaiserin Maria Theresia (some sources say Theresa.)

== Wartime service ==
She was sold to the Imperial Russian Navy in 1904 for use in the Russo-Japanese War. The Russians rebuilt her as an auxiliary cruiser and renamed her Ural. In October she left Kronstadt to join Admiral Zinovy Rozhestvensky's fleet on its way to Vladivostok. In May 1905, Ural was used as a scout ship and was the first ship to sight Admiral Tōgō Heihachirō's fleet at the Battle of Tsushima. In an action with Japanese battleships, she was hit by a 12-inch (305 mm) shell in the engine room and eventually torpedoed and sunk by a Japanese destroyer.

== Bibliography ==
- Frampton, Viktor; Stewart, Charles & Thorne, Phil (2007). "Question 38/43: Russian Auxiliary Cruiser Ural". Warship International. XLIV (2): 151–152. ISSN 0043-0374.
- Greger, Rene (1986). "Question 35/84". Warship International. XXIII (3): 318. ISSN 0043-0374.
