= Brighstone Grange Lifeboat Station =

Former RNLI lifeboat station on the Isle of Wight, England

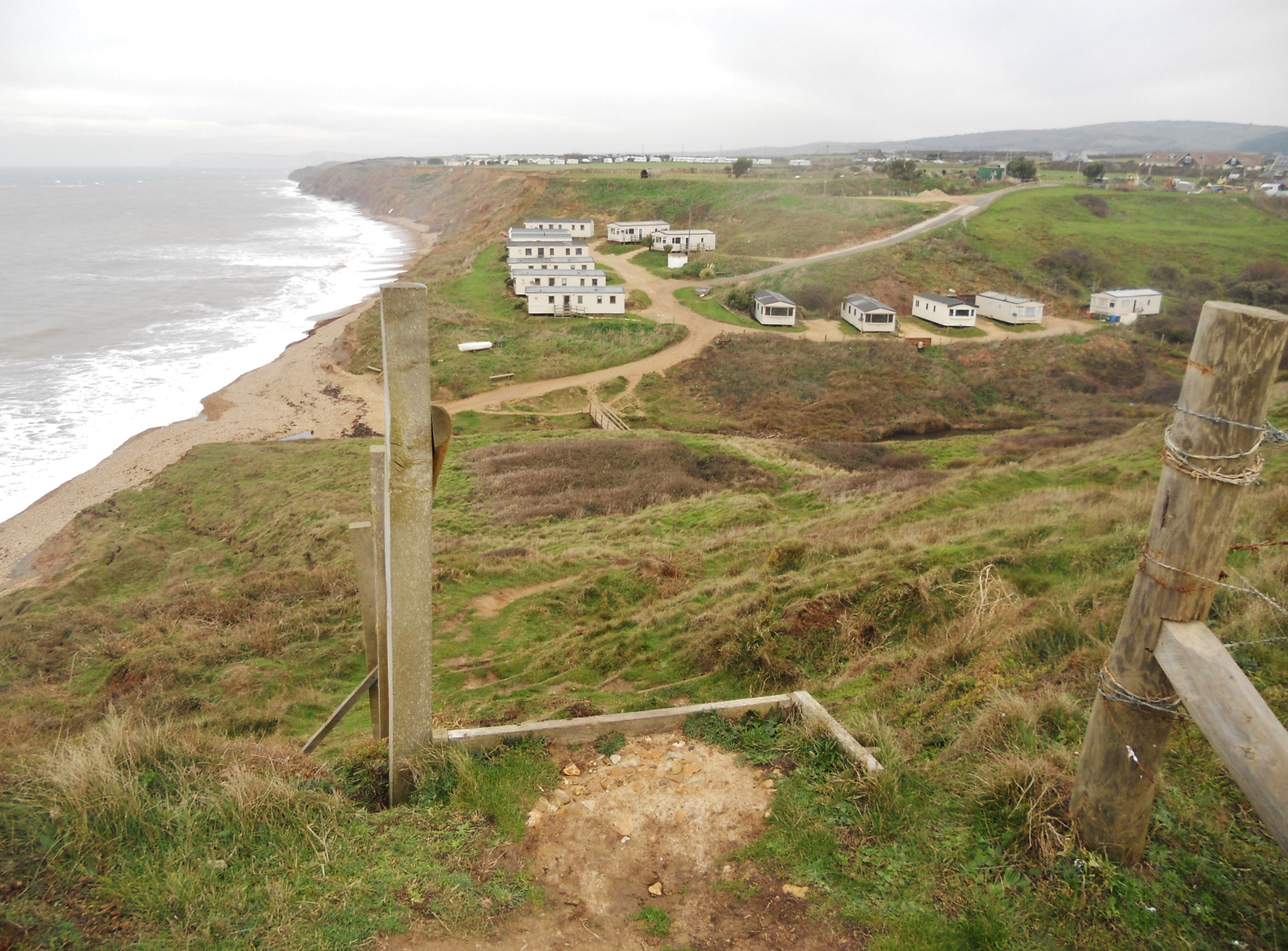
- Location of former Lifeboat Station, Brighstone Grange

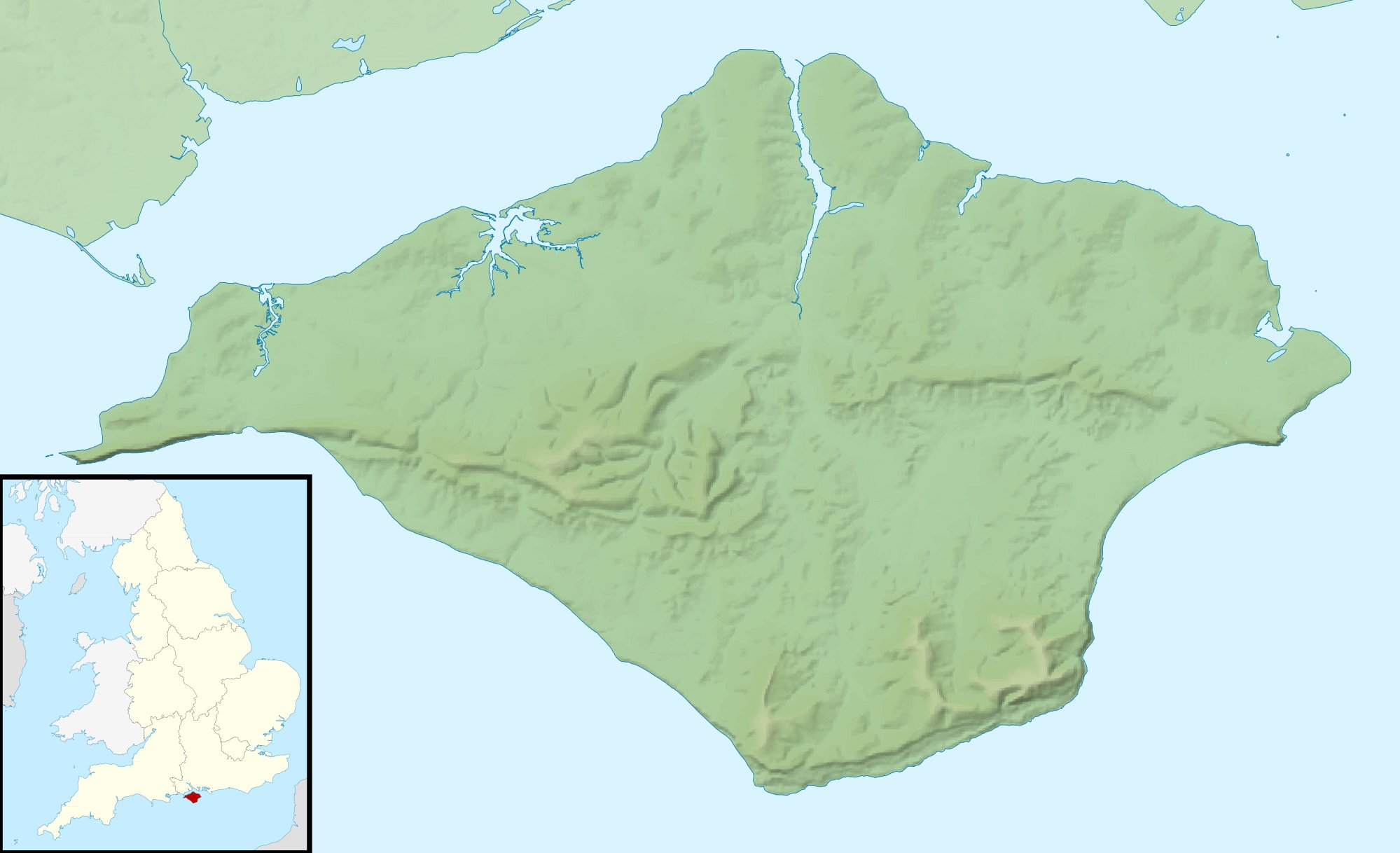
- Brighstone Grange, Isle of Wight
- Former names: Grange Lifeboat Station

General information
- Status: Closed
- Type: RNLI Lifeboat Station
- Location: Grange Chine, Brighstone, Isle of Wight, England
- Coordinates: 50°38′04.2″N 1°24′25.4″W
- Opened: 13 August 1860
- Closed: 7 October 1915

Brighstone Grange Lifeboat Station, (for some time known as Grange Lifeboat Station), was located at Grange Chine, near the village of Brighstone, (formerly Brixton), on the south west coast of the Isle of Wight.

A lifeboat was first placed at Grange Chine, on Brixton Bay, by the Royal National Lifeboat Institution (RNLI) in 1860.

After 55 years service, Brighstone Grange Lifeboat Station was closed in 1915.

== Appeal ==
The origins of both Brighstone Grange and Brooke lifeboat stations are linked, as it was the loss of two ships that prompted the opening of both stations.

On 6 December 1859, the barque Mirabita of Malta, on passage from Marseille to London, was driven ashore and wrecked at Chale Bay. 12 of the 17 crew lost their lives. On the same night, the schooner Sentinel, on passage to Sunderland, was wrecked at the same location. Two crew of the six aboard were lost.

A letter was written to the RNLI in 1859, from Edward McAll, Rural Dean and Rector of Brighstone, and John Pellow Gaze, Rector of Brook, appealing for the provision of a lifeboat.
"It is a matter of painful notoriety, that 14 lives were lost by shipwreck at the back of the Island, about three weeks ago. It was stated by the officers of coastguard and by others at the Inquest, that if a life-boat had been at hand, the whole of these lives might have been saved".

== History ==
A visit to the area was made by Capt. John Ward, RNLI Inspector of Lifeboats, who concluded that two lifeboats should be placed on the SW coast of the Isle of Wight, one at Brook, and a second one at Grange Chine, Brighstone.
"Lying near the track of all vessels passing up or down the Channel, the coast on this part of the island has always been liable to wrecks, and the want of a lifeboat has been greatly felt on it. Three vessels and several lives were lost here during last winter, which awoke a general local interest in the subject, and led to the establishment of these boats, which, it is to be hoped, will be the means of rescuing the crews of any vessels lost in this locality in future years."

Both stations would be officially opened on 13 August 1860. The funds for the lifeboat and equipment at Grange Chine was raised by the Royal Victoria Yacht Club.

The first Brighstone lifeboat was a 30-foot self-righting 'Pulling and Sailing' (P&S) lifeboat, one with sails and (6) oars, built by Forrest of Limehouse, at a cost of £148-9s-6d. A brick-built boathouse was constructed near the beach, costing £317-11s, and funded by local subscription. At the ceremony on 13 August 1860, the lifeboat was named Rescue.

Brighstone lifeboat was required to perform an extraordinary service on its first call. The barque Cedarine of Bermuda, a convict ship on its maiden voyage from Bermuda to Portsmouth, ran aground just 100 yards (91 m) to the east of Grange Chine. On board were 13 crew, 27 passengers, and 191 convicts, who had served their sentence and were due to be released. 134 people were rescued by the lifeboat, with the remainder rescued by the coastguard. The vessel subsequently broke up, but materials salvaged were used for the restoration of the Mottistone church.

A replacement boat, previously on service at Tramore, was sent to the station in 1866, another 30-foot self-righting (P&S) lifeboat, built by Forrestt of Limehouse. She was also then named Rescue.

On 3 February 1873, Brighstone lifeboat was launched to the aid of the steamship Woodham of Christiania (Oslo), Norway, on passage from Newcastle upon Tyne to New York, when her main shaft failed. The vessel was taken in tow 4 times by a steamship, each time the line parting, until it was too late, and she ran aground on the Chilton Ledges. In two trips, 18 men were rescued from the ships boats by the Brighstone lifeboat. The Master and mate had stayed aboard, but were later rescued on a third trip by the lifeboat. Coxswain James Buckett was awarded the RNLI Silver Medal.

By 1880, the Rescue was deemed too small, and a 34-foot self-righting (P&S) lifeboat was ordered from by Woolfe & Sons of Shadwell. The boat was funded by monies raised by the staff and cadets of the Thames Nautical Training College known as HMS Worcester. At a ceremony at Greenhithe, Kent, on the River Thames, whilst alongside HMS Worcester, the lifeboat was named Worcester Cadet (ON 226). Arriving at Cowes on 10 August 1880, the boat was pulled by six horses on her carriage to Newport, where she was met by the band of the Isle of Wight Rifles, and handed over to the Isle of Wight Lifeboat Board.

Launched to the aid of the steamship Duke of Westminster on 3 January 1884, driven ashore at Atherfield whilst on passage from London to Brisbane, the Brighstone Grange lifeboat brought ashore 20 passengers. The following day, the weather worsened during attempts to refloat the vessel, and 50 men were taken off.

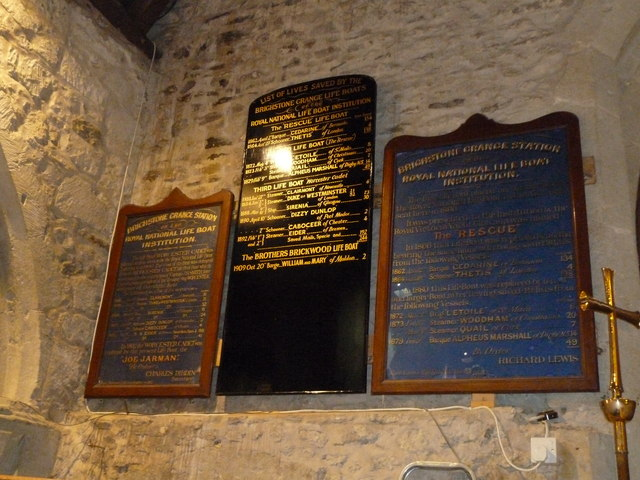
Brighstone Lifeboat Service Boards at St Mary's Church

The Worcester Cadet was launched to the full-rigged ship Sirenia on 9 March 1888, on passage from San Francisco, to Dunkirk, when she ran aground on Atherstone Ledge in thick fog. A handful of people were taken off on the first trip, including the captain's wife, children, a servant and an apprentice. As the weather worsened, the lifeboat set out again, but with 11 crewmen rescued, the lifeboat capsized. 2 crewmen were lost, along with both the Coxswain and Second Coxswain of the lifeboat, Moses Munt and Tom Cotton. Despite this disaster, the lifeboat put out again, and rescued the remaining crew. 30 lives off the Sirenia had been saved. For their service, David Cotton, William Cotton, and Frank Salter were awarded the RNLI Silver Medal.

Two more lifeboats would serve at Brighstone Grange, the Joe Jarman (ON 328) from 1892, and the Brothers Brickwood (ON 574) from 1907. As the 20th century progressed, there was a massive decline in the number of sailing ships, always at the mercy of the weather, in favour of motor-powered vessels, and lifeboats were required less and less. Brighstone Lifeboat Station closed on 7 October 1915.

The last boat on station, Brothers Brickwood (ON 574), was transferred to the relief fleet, later serving at Scarborough from 1918 to 1924. The boat was last reported as being converted to be a yacht, in Alicante in 2019. There is no evidence of the boathouse, other than some foundations. The site is now a caravan park.

== Station honours ==
The following are awards made at Brighstone Grange.

- RNLI Silver Medal

James Buckett, Coxswain – 1873

David Cotton, crew member – 1888
William Cotton, crew member – 1888
Frank Salter, crew member – 1888

James Cotton, Coxswain – 1892

- Gold Watch, presented by His Imperial Majesty Wilhelm II, Emperor of Germany

James Cotton, Coxswain – 1892

- The Thanks of the Institution inscribed on Vellum

Rev F. B. Lipscombe MA, Honorary Secretary – 1892

== Roll of honour ==
In memory of those lost at Brighstone Grange Lifeboat Station.

- Lost when the Lifeboat Worcester Cadet capsized, whilst on service to the Sirenia, 9 March 1888

Moses Munt, Coxswain (57)
Thomas Cotton, Second Coxswain (49)

- Male spectator, fatally injured by the lifeboat carriage during launch, 29 September 1893

Ben Cooper (72)

== Brighstone Grange lifeboats ==
=== Pulling and Sailing (P&S) lifeboats ===
ON (Note: ON is the RNLI's Official Number of the boat.)	Name	Built	On station	Class	Comments
Pre-360	Rescue	1860	1860−1866	30-foot Peake Self-righting (P&S)	(Note: 30-foot x 7-foot (6-oared) Peake-class self-righting (P&S) lifeboat, gift of the Royal Victoria Yacht Club (England) via Com. Akers, built by Forrestt of Limehouse, London. costing £148.)
Pre-333	Rescue	1858	1866−1880	30-foot Peake Self-righting (P&S)	(Note: 30-foot x 6-foot 6in (6-oared) Peake-class self-righting (P&S) lifeboat, from RNLI funds, built by Forrestt of Limehouse, London, costing £136 when new.); Previously unnamed at Tramore.
226	Worcester Cadet	1879	1880−1892	34-foot Self-righting (P&S)	(Note: 34-foot x 8-foot (10-oared) self-righting (P&S) lifeboat, gift of the 'HMS Worcester Cadet' LB fund, built by Woolfe of Shadwell, London, costing £363.)
328	Joe Jarman	1892	1892−1907	34-foot Self-righting (P&S)	(Note: 34-foot x 8-foot (10-oared) self-righting (P&S) lifeboat, legacy of Miss Jarman of Slough, built by Wm. T. Ellis of Lowestoft, costing £379.)
574	Brothers Brickwood	1907	1907−1915	35-foot Self-righting (P&S)	(Note: 35-foot x 8-foot 6in (10-oared) self-righting (P&S) lifeboat, legacy of Mr E. D. Brickwood of Boscombe, built by Thames Ironworks of Blackwall, London, costing £871.)

Station Closed, 1915
Pre ON numbers are unofficial numbers used by the Lifeboat Enthusiast Society to reference early lifeboats not included on the official RNLI list.

== See also ==
- List of RNLI stations
- List of former RNLI stations
- Independent lifeboats in Britain and Ireland
