= Garstons Down =

Downland and SSSI on the Isle of Wight

Coordinates: 50.657°N 1.335°W

Garston's Down
- Site of Special Scientific Interest
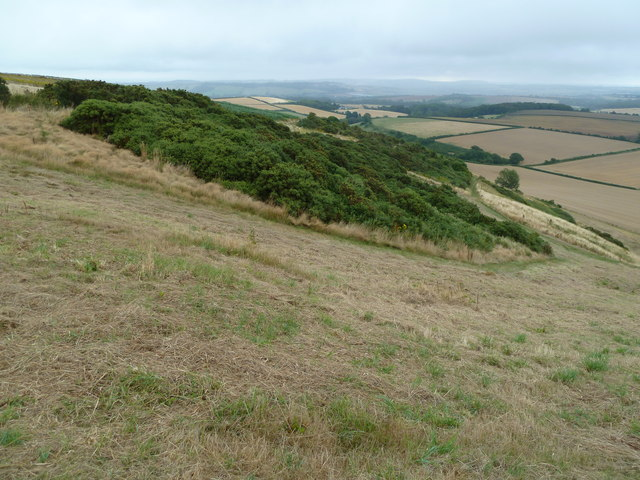
- Location of Garston's Down.
- Area of search: Isle of Wight
- Grid reference: SZ475855
- Interest: Biological
- Area: 20.3 ha (50 acres)
- Notification date: 1971
- Location map: Natural England

Garston's Down is an area of downland on the Isle of Wight, rising to an altitude of 151 m (495 ft). It is located in the centre of the island, south of Carisbrooke and west of Gatcombe, and is one of the best remaining inland examples of unimproved chalk downland. An area of 20.3 hectares (50 acres) was notified as a Site of Special Scientific Interest (SSSI) in 1971 for its biological features. The down is situated in a remote area and provides extensive views over the surrounding countryside and distant coast.

== The SSSI ==
The SSSI comprises a deep dry valley with steep chalk escarpments to east and west, and a ridge to the east. The upper slopes are characterised by a layer of flinty gravel and the whole site is grazed by sheep. The chalk grassland is dominated by sheep's fescue and includes a wide range of herbs, with an average of 33 species being recorded in every square metre (11 sq ft). Some specialities are large populations of pyramidal orchid and bee orchid, and a vigorous colony of burnt-tip orchid, the only known location for this species on the island. There are also numerous plants of the calcium-loving early gentian.

The gravelly area on the upper slopes and at the head of the valley has a different flora. The soil here is acidic and the dominant grass is common-bent grass, often accompanied by foxgloves, heath bedstraw and sheep's sorrel, the grassland being interspersed with patches of gorse. Trees and scrub have developed on the eastern ridge, the main constituents being bramble, hawthorn and wayfaring tree, and in places there is taller woodland, mostly composed of ash and hazel, which are often draped with old man's beard.
