= Atherfield Ledge =

Coordinates: 50.61°N 1.36°W

Atherfield Ledge is a rocky outcrop extending from the coast of the Back of the Wight, Isle of Wight. This is a famous shipwreck location. Along with Brook Ledge and Brighstone Ledge it is one of the area's main shipping hazards.

== Geography ==
About two miles east from the Brighstone Ledge, the Atherfield Ledge is a small (half a mile square) outcrop occupying a central position, reaching into the current.

Numerous ships have been wrecked upon this ledge because it is the focal point of the tide. Many have left their remains, turning it into a graveyard.

== Atherfield Ledge shipwrecks ==
- SS Eider
- Sirenia - in which several lifeboat men lost their lives.
- Diligent - Ore steamer.
- Auguste 1900 - Cargo of Eucalyptus wood from Australia
- Alcester 1897 - Cargo of Jute from India
