= MV Ice Prince =

Coordinates: 50°11′6″N 2°50′6″W

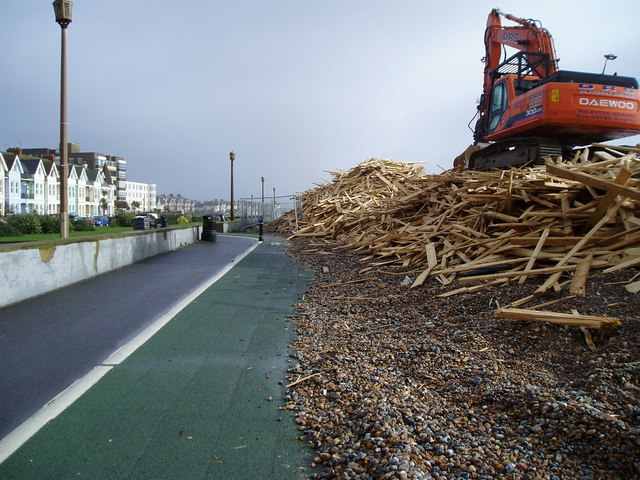
Wood pile beside a Worthing cycleway of the Ice Prince

The MV Ice Prince was a 328-foot Greek-registered cargo ship which sank in the English Channel on 15 January 2008 at 12:45am, spilling 2,516 tonnes of timber, around 423 tonnes of intermediate fuel oil and 123 tonnes of marine diesel oil. Twenty crew members were rescued by HM Coastguard helicopter and Brixham lifeboat.

Timber from the cargo washed ashore along the south coast of England. Beaches along the south coast of England were closed to prevent looters taking away washed-up timber.

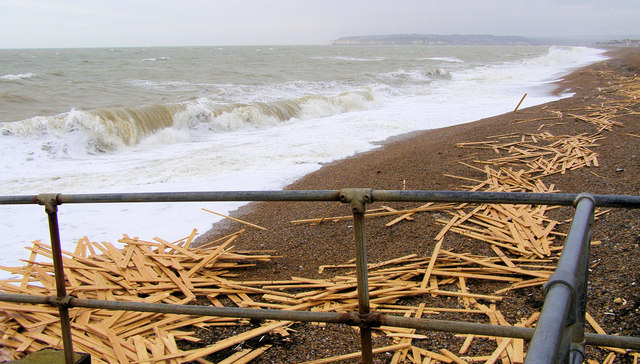
Timber from the ship Ice Prince in Seaford Bay
