= Brooke Lifeboat Station =

Former RNLI lifeboat station on the Isle of Wight, UK

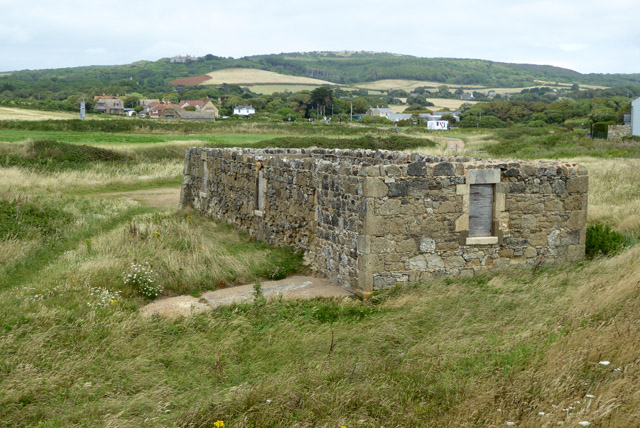
- Ruins of Brooke Lifeboat Station, Isle of Wight

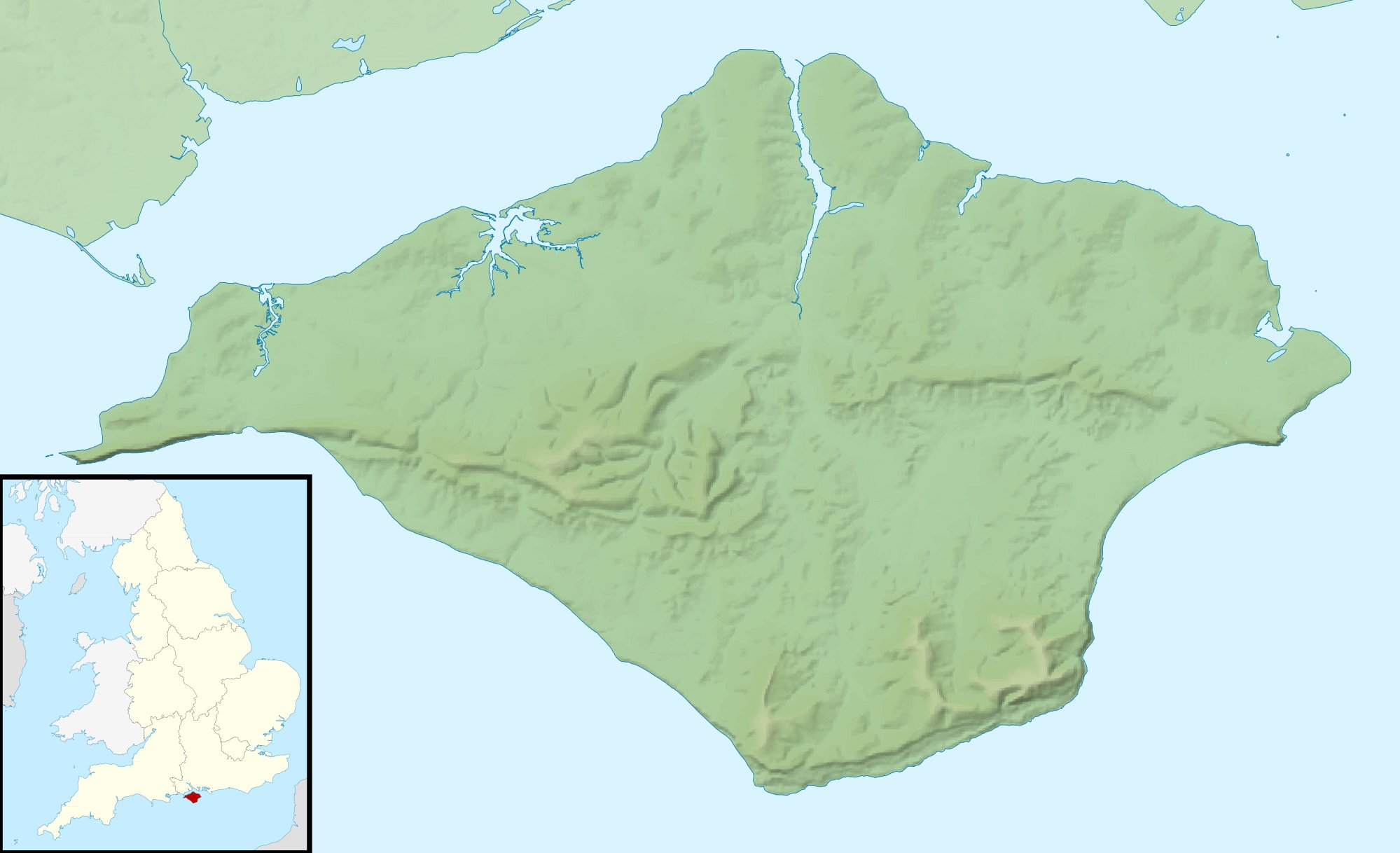
- Brook, Isle of Wight

General information
- Status: Closed
- Type: RNLI Lifeboat Station
- Location: Brook, Isle of Wight, England
- Coordinates: 50°38′59.4″N 1°27′19.7″W
- Opened: 13 August 1860
- Closed: 31 March 1937

Brooke Lifeboat Station was located at Brook Chine, near the village of Brook, on the south west coast of the Isle of Wight.

A lifeboat was first placed at Brook in 1860, by the Royal National Lifeboat Institution (RNLI).

After 77 years service, Brooke Lifeboat Station was closed in 1937.

"Brook" is used in every reference work of the name of the village, other than all RNLI documents, and on the lifeboat service board, which refers to the name "Brooke".

== Appeal ==
The origins of both Brighstone Grange and Brooke lifeboat stations are linked, as it was the loss of two ships that prompted the opening of both stations.

On 6 December 1859, the barque Mirabita of Malta, on passage from Marseille to London, was driven ashore and wrecked at Chale Bay. 12 of the 17 crew lost their lives. On the same night, the schooner Sentinel, on passage to Sunderland, was wrecked at the same location. Two crew of the six aboard were lost.

A letter was written to the RNLI in 1859, from Edward McAll, Rural Dean and Rector of Brighstone, and John Pellow Gaze, Rector of Brook, appealing for the provision of a lifeboat.
"It is a matter of painful notoriety, that 14 lives were lost by shipwreck at the back of the Island, about three weeks ago. It was stated by the officers of coastguard and by others at the Inquest, that if a life-boat had been at hand, the whole of these lives might have been saved".

A visit to the area was made by Capt. John Ward, RNLI Inspector of Lifeboats, who concluded that two lifeboats should be placed on the SW coast of the Isle of Wight, one at Brook, and a second one at Grange Chine, Brighstone. Funds for the Brooke lifeboat were raised locally, and both stations would be officially opened on 13 August 1860.

== History ==
The first lifeboat to be placed at Brook was a 30-foot self-righting 'pulling and sailing' (P&S) lifeboat, one with oars and sails, built by Forrest of Limehouse, at a cost of £148-9s-6d. A stone-built boathouse was constructed at the top of Brook Chine, on land given by Charles Seely.
"Lying near the track of all vessels passing up or down the Channel, the coast on this part of the island has always been liable to wrecks, and the want of a lifeboat has been greatly felt on it. Three vessels and several lives were lost here during last winter, which awoke a general local interest in the subject, and led to the establishment of these boats, which, it is to be hoped, will be the means of rescuing the crews of any vessels lost in this locality in future years."

At the ceremony on 13 August 1860, the boat was named Dauntless. Very little is known about the Dauntless. The boat is mentioned on the Service Board, now hanging in St Mary's Church, Brook, but no rescues are recorded. In May 1867, Dauntless was replaced with a 32-foot self-righting (P&S) lifeboat, George and Anne.

On 16 November 1871, the barque Cassandra was driven ashore and wrecked, whilst on passage from Madras (Chennai) to London. The 21 crew were rescued by the Brooke lifeboat.

The George and Anne was launched to the aid of the barque Mignonette on 19 January 1876, which had run aground on Brook Ledge on passage from Berbice, British Guiana. All 14 crew were rescued.

The 34-foot self-righting (P&S) lifeboat William Slaney Lewis (ON 144) was sent to the station on 30 January 1888, replacing George and Anne. The boat had been funded from the legacy of Mr. W. S. Lewis of Wellington, Shropshire. Only two months later, on 9 March, she would be the first lifeboat to respond to the steamship Sirenia, which had run aground on the Atherfield Ledge. Nearing the wreck, three crewmen were washed overboard. Ben and Philip Jacobs regained the boat, but Second Coxswain Rueben Cooper was washed away. His body was never recovered. Still offering to rescue the crew of the Sirenia, Capt. McIntyre of the Sirenia insisted they continue the search for Mr Cooper, and that they would take their chances of rescue later. All but two of the Sirenia were rescued by the Brighstone Grange lifeboat, but two crewmen, and two lifeboatmen from Brighstone Grange, would also lose their lives when that lifeboat capsized. For this service, Coxswain John Hayter, would be awarded his second RNLI Silver Medal

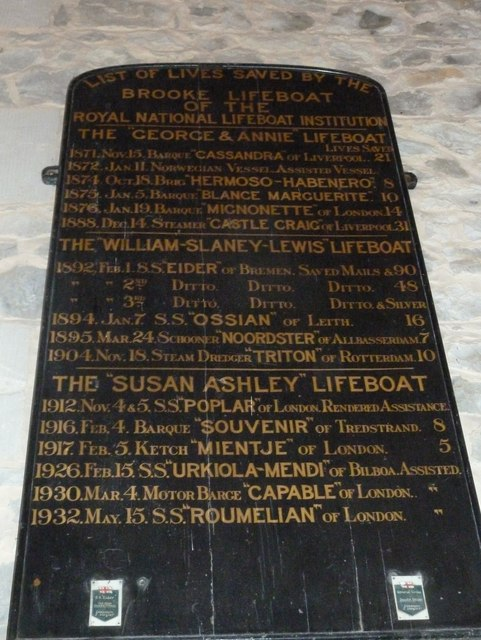
Lifeboat Service Board, St Mary's Church, Brook

The last lifeboat on station at Brooke was the 35-foot Self-righting (P&S) lifeboat Susan Ashley (ON 579), placed on station on the 5 September 1907. On the night of 3 February 1916, the Norwegian barque Souvenir was bound for Lisbon, when she ran aground on the Great Stag Ledge, east of Brook Chine, about 1 nautical mile (1.9 km) off shore. Spotted at daybreak, the Brooke lifeboat was launched into terrible conditions. Unable to get alongside, the crew had no option but to jump into the sea, and hope to be rescued by the lifeboat. Eight of the 10 men were rescued, but the Captain was lost, and one man died in the lifeboat of exposure. Coxswain Benjamin Jacobs, himself once washed overboard from the lifeboat in 1888, was awarded the RNLI Silver Medal.

By 1937, with declining numbers of sailing vessels shipwrecked, and a motor lifeboat at both Yarmouth and Bembridge, it was decided to withdraw the lifeboat. Brooke Lifeboat Station closed on the 31 March 1937.

The ruins of the boathouse are still visible. The Susan Ashley (ON 579) was sold from service, and was last reported wrecked in 1986. The lifeboat service board hangs in St Mary's church, Brook.

== Station honours ==
The following are awards made at Brooke.

- RNIPLS Silver Medal
  Lt. William Gould, RN, H.M. Coastguard, Brook – 1845
- RNLI Silver Medal
  Thomas Baker, Coastguardsman, H.M. Coastguard, Brook – 1860
  John Hayter, Coxswain – 1886
  John Hayter, Coxswain – 1888 (Second-Service clasp)
  John Hayter, Coxswain – 1892 (Third-Service clasp)
  John Hayter, Coxswain – 1892 (Fourth-Service clasp)
  Benjamin Jacobs, Coxswain – 1916
- Gold Watch, presented by His Imperial Majesty Wilhelm II, Emperor of Germany
  John Hayter, Coxswain – 1892
- The Thanks of the Institution inscribed on Vellum
  Six crew – 1860
  Rev J. Pellew Gaze – 1860
  W. Hillier, Honorary Secretary – 1892
  J. Cooke, Assistant Coxswain – 1916
- Letter of Thanks signed by the Secretary of the Institution
  Thomas Way – 1860

== Roll of honour ==
In memory of those lost whilst serving Brooke lifeboat.

- Killed whilst launching the lifeboat, 29 October 1865
  Mr McLeod, coastguard.
- Washed overboard from Brooke lifeboat George and Ann, whilst on service to the Sirenia, 9 March 1888
  Reuben Cooper, Second Coxswain (66)

== Brooke lifeboats ==
=== Pulling and Sailing (P&S) lifeboats ===
ON (Note: ON is the RNLI's Official Number of the boat.)	Name	Built	On station	Class	Comments
Pre-364	Dauntless	1860	1860−1867	30-foot Peake Self-righting (P&S)	(Note: 30-foot x 7-foot (6-oared) Peake-class self-righting (P&S) lifeboat, from RNLI funds, built by Forrestt of Limehouse, London, costing £148.)
Pre-496	George and Anne	1867	1867−1888	32-foot Prowse Self-righting (P&S)	(Note: 32-foot x 7-foot 6in (10-oared) Prowse-class self-righting (P&S) lifeboat, gift of Mr G. Marten and Miss A. Marten of Upper Clapton, built by Forrestt of Limehouse, London, costing £272-11s-9d.)
144	William Slaney Lewis	1888	1888−1907	34-foot Self-righting (P&S)	(Note: 34-foot x 7-foot 6in (10-oared) self-righting (P&S) lifeboat, legacy of Mr W. S. Lewis of Wellington, Somerset, built by Hansen and Sons of East Cowes, costing £347.)
579	Susan Ashley	1907	1907−1937	35-foot Self-righting (P&S)	(Note: 35-foot x 8-foot 6in (10-oared) self-righting (P&S) lifeboat, legacy of Mr C. C. Ashley of Menton, France, built by Thames Ironworks of Blackwall, London, costing £844.)

Pre ON numbers are unofficial numbers used by the Lifeboat Enthusiasts' Society to reference early lifeboats not included on the official RNLI list.

=== Launch and recovery tractors ===
Op. No. (Note: Op. No. is the RNLI's Operational Number of the boat or vehicle carried on the hull.)	Reg. No.	Type	On station	Comments
T4	XA 9192	Clayton	1931	
T12	IJ 5658	Clayton	1933–1937	

== See also ==
- List of RNLI stations
- List of former RNLI stations
- Independent lifeboats in Britain and Ireland
