= Grade I listed buildings on the Isle of Wight =

There are over 9,300 Grade I listed buildings in England. This page is a list of these buildings in the county of Isle of Wight.

In the United Kingdom, the term listed building refers to a building or other structure officially designated as being of special architectural, historical, or cultural significance; Grade I structures are those considered to be "buildings of exceptional interest". Listing was begun by a provision in the Town and Country Planning Act 1947. Once listed, strict limitations are imposed on the modifications allowed to a building's structure or fittings. In England, the authority for listing under the Planning (Listed Buildings and Conservation Areas) Act 1990 rests with English Heritage, a non-departmental public body sponsored by the Department for Culture, Media and Sport; local authorities have a responsibility to regulate and enforce the planning regulations.

== Buildings ==
Name	Location	Type	Architect	Completed (Note: The date given is the date used by Historic England as significant for the initial building or that of an important part in the structure's description.)	Date designated	Grid ref. (Note: Sometimes known as OSGB36, the grid reference is based on the British national grid reference system used by the Ordnance Survey.) Geo-coordinates	Entry number (Note: The "List Entry Number" is a unique number assigned to each listed building and scheduled monument by Historic England.)	Image
St. Mary's Church	Brading	Church		c. 1200	18 January 1967	SZ6066287316; 50°40′56″N 1°08′34″W	1034341	St. Mary's Church More images
Bembridge Windmill	Bembridge	Mill		c. 1700	16 April 1953	SZ6398087476; 50°41′00″N 1°05′45″W	1034383	Bembridge Windmill More images
Newport Minster	Newport	Church		1855	1 October 1953	SZ4997389145; 50°41′59″N 1°17′38″W	1034494	Newport Minster More images
Carisbrooke Roman Villa	Clatterford Road, Carisbrooke	Villa		1445	1 February 1972	SZ4850988085; 50°41′25″N 1°18′53″W	1034633	Carisbrooke Roman Villa
Carisbrooke Castle	Newport	Castle			1 February 1972	SZ4859487774; 50°41′15″N 1°18′48″W	1034657	Carisbrooke Castle More images
Roman Villa	Newport	Villa		1445	1 February 1972	SZ5011688536; 50°41′40″N 1°17′31″W	1034658	Roman Villa More images
St. George's Church	Arreton	Church			18 January 1967	SZ5344386761; 50°40′41″N 1°14′42″W	1209193	St. George's Church More images
All Saints' Church	Church Hill, Godshill	Church			18 January 1967	SZ5272381826; 50°38′02″N 1°15′21″W	1209229	All Saints' Church More images
St. Peter's Church	Main Road, Shorwell	Church			18 January 1967	SZ4573282996; 50°38′42″N 1°21′16″W	1209404	St. Peter's Church More images
Appuldurcombe House	Appuldurcombe Road, Godshill	House	John James	1713	21 July 1951	SZ5431979973; 50°37′01″N 1°14′01″W	1218394	Appuldurcombe House More images
Farringford Hotel	Freshwater	House			18 January 1967	SZ3372786157; 50°40′27″N 1°31′27″W	1219039	Farringford Hotel More images
Roman Villa	Brading	Villa			18 January 1967	SZ5995986269; 50°40′23″N 1°09′10″W	1219584	Roman Villa More images
Church of St. Michael the Archangel	Shalfleet	Church		c. 1070	18 January 1967	SZ4137789233; 50°42′05″N 1°24′56″W	1219684	Church of St. Michael the Archangel More images
Church of St. John the Baptist	Northwood	Church			17 August 1951	SZ4937892956; 50°44′03″N 1°18′06″W	1222705	Church of St. John the Baptist More images
Norris Castle Farm, The Bailiff's House, two cottages & kitchen garden wall	East Cowes	House		c. 1800	17 August 1951	SZ5150095837; 50°45′35″N 1°16′16″W	1223182	Upload Photo
Osborne House	Whippingham Road, East Cowes	House			9 August 1979	SZ5159294802; 50°45′02″N 1°16′12″W	1223802	Osborne House More images
Quarr Abbey	Fishbourne	Abbey		1907	18 May 1972	SZ5621392726; 50°43′53″N 1°12′18″W	1235008	Quarr Abbey More images
Norris Castle	Newbarn Road, East Cowes	House		1799	17 August 1951	SZ5154496198; 50°45′47″N 1°16′14″W	1267468	Norris Castle More images
St. Mildred's Church	Beatrice Avenue, Whippingham	Church		1862	17 August 1951	SZ5112193607; 50°44′23″N 1°16′37″W	1267717	St. Mildred's Church More images
St Mary's Church	Carisbrooke	Church			1 October 1953	SZ4855788250; 50°41′31″N 1°18′50″W	1278134	St Mary's Church More images
All Saints' Church	Newchurch	Church			14 February 1992	SZ5618585554; 50°40′01″N 1°12′23″W	1290840	All Saints' Church More images
Golden Hill Fort	Freshwater	Bridge		1872	28 March 1994	SZ3385787862; 50°41′22″N 1°31′19″W	1291516	Golden Hill Fort More images
St. Mary's Church	Main Road, Brighstone	Church		1727	18 January 1967	SZ4290482697; 50°38′33″N 1°23′41″W	1292128	St. Mary's Church More images
Yarmouth Castle	Yarmouth	Castle		c. 1670	28 March 1994	SZ3538889774; 50°42′24″N 1°30′01″W	1292631	Yarmouth Castle More images
Wolverton Manor	Pound Lane, Shorwell	House			21 July 1951	SZ4528582448; 50°38′24″N 1°21′39″W	1292659	Wolverton Manor More images
St. Peter and St. Paul's Church	Mottistone, Brighstone	Church			18 January 1967	SZ4055583721; 50°39′06″N 1°25′40″W	1292718	St. Peter and St. Paul's Church More images
St. Olave's Church	Gatcombe	Church			18 January 1967	SZ4924085094; 50°39′48″N 1°18′17″W	1292758	St. Olave's Church More images
Church of St John the Baptist	Yaverland	Church		1150	14 March 1949	SZ6139585942; 50°40′12″N 1°07′57″W	1365369	Church of St John the Baptist More images
Yaverland Manor	Sandown	House		c. 1620	14 March 1949	SZ6142285938; 50°40′12″N 1°07′56″W	1365370	Yaverland Manor More images

== See also ==
- Grade II* listed buildings on the Isle of Wight
