= Jacquetta Hawkes =

British archaeologist (1910–1996)

Jacquetta Hawkes OBE FBA
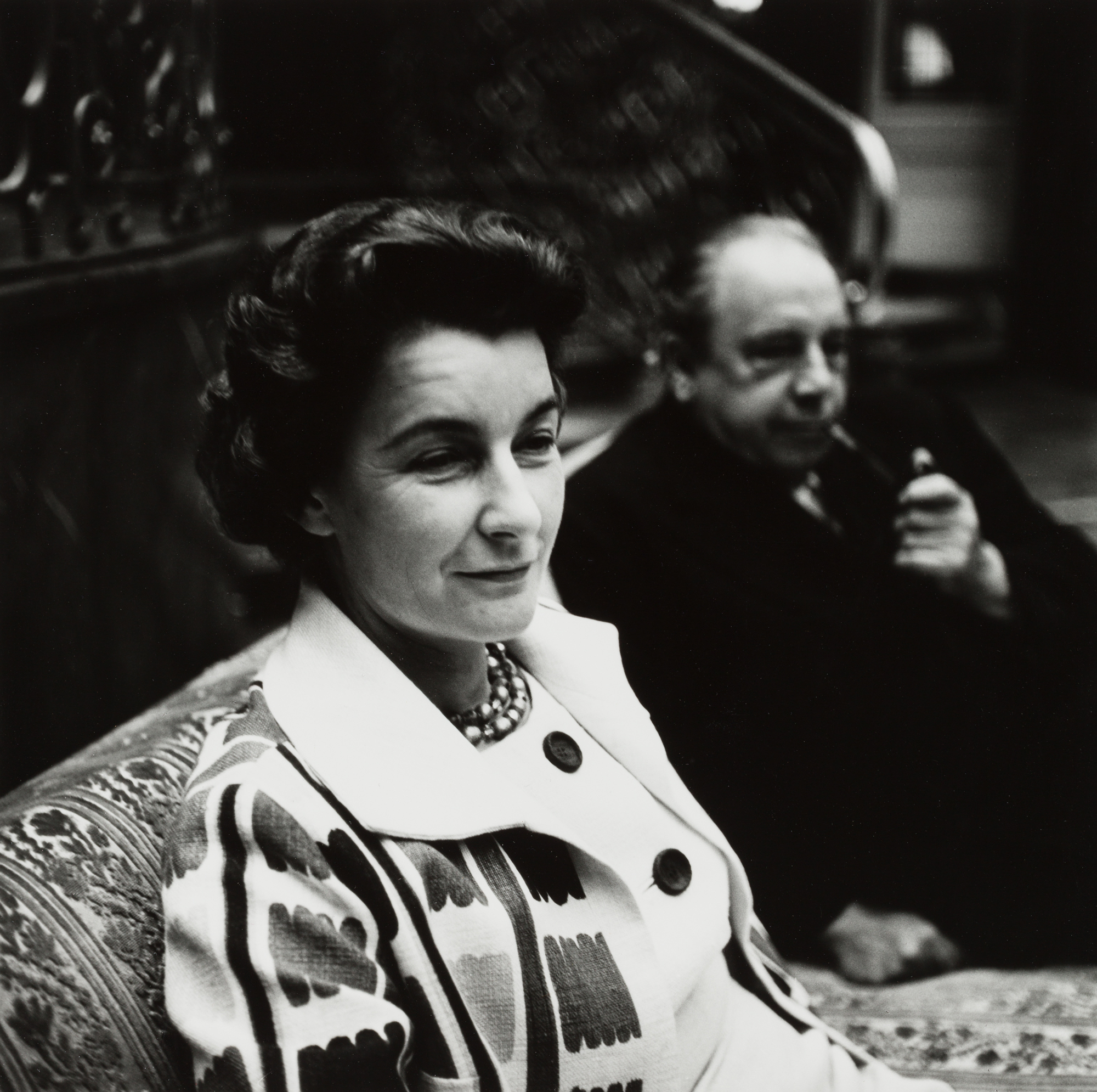
- Hawkes (left) and J. B. Priestley in 1960
- Born: 5 August 1910; Cambridge, England
- Died: 18 March 1996 (aged 85); Cheltenham, Gloucestershire, England
- Education: University of Cambridge
- Occupations: Writer; archaeologist
- Spouses: Christopher Hawkes (m. 1933; div. 1953); J. B. Priestley (m. 1953; died 1984)

Jacquetta Hawkes (5 August 1910 – 18 March 1996) was an English archaeologist and writer. She was the first woman to study the Archaeology & Anthropology degree course at the University of Cambridge. A specialist in prehistoric archaeology, she excavated Neanderthal remains at the Palaeolithic site of Mount Carmel with Yusra and Dorothy Garrod. She was a representative for the UK at UNESCO, and was curator of the "People of Britain" pavilion at the Festival of Britain.

Widely recognised for her book A Land (1951), she wrote widely on archaeology, fusing a literary style of writing with a deep knowledge of landscape and past human lives, as well as using film and radio to enable archaeology to reach new audiences. In 1953 she married J. B. Priestley, with whom she authored several works. She was co-founder of the Campaign for Nuclear Disarmament and an active campaigner in the Homosexual Law Reform Society. In 1967 she published Dawn of the Gods, a "feminine" interpretation of the Minoan civilisation. In 1971, the Council for British Archaeology rewarded her advocacy for the discipline with the role of vice-president.

== Early life and education ==
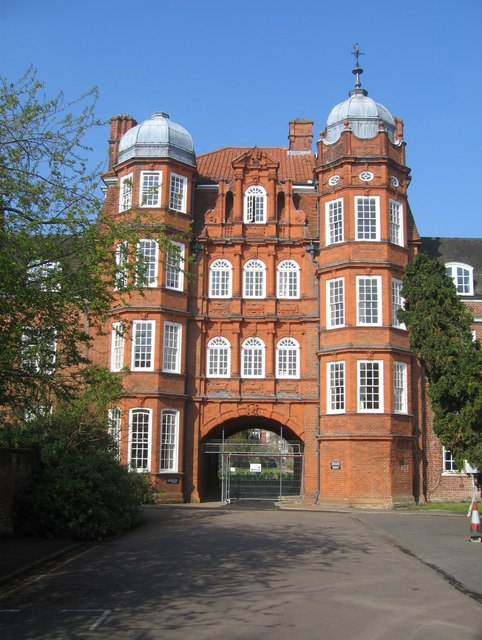
Pfeiffer Arch – Newnham College

Born Jessie Jacquetta Hopkins, on 5 August 1910 in Cambridge, she was the youngest child of Sir Frederick Gowland Hopkins, biochemist and Nobel Prize winner, and his wife Jessie Ann, daughter of Edward William Stevens, ship's fitter, of Ramsgate. She had one brother and one sister. Her father was a cousin of the poet Gerard Manley Hopkins. Her parents met at Guy's Hospital, where they both worked. Interested in archaeology from a young age, she made her first investigations aged nine when she found out her home was on the site of an early medieval cemetery, sneaking out of the house at night to dig in the garden.

From 1921 to 1928 she attended Perse School for Girls, going on in 1929 to study the new degree of Archaeology & Anthropology at Newnham College, Cambridge, where she was the first woman to do so. In her second year at university she took part in the excavation of a Roman site near Colchester, and there met her future first husband, the archaeologist Christopher Hawkes (1905–1992). She graduated with a first-class honours degree from the University of Cambridge.

== Early career ==
After her graduation, in 1932, she travelled to Palestine and joined the British School of Archaeology in Jerusalem, in order to excavate on Mount Carmel, alongside Yusra and Dorothy Garrod. There she supervised the excavation of a Neanderthal skeleton. On her return from Palestine, she married Christopher Hawkes on 7 October 1933 at Trinity College, Cambridge, when she was aged 22.

In 1934 she had published her first article "Aspects of the Neolithic and Chalcolithic periods in western Europe" in Antiquity. The same year, she visited a seven-year-old David Attenborough's "museum" of fossils and geology, donating specimens to it. In 1935 she led a BBC Radio programme "Ancient Britain Out of Doors", introducing key ideas about archaeology then discussing them with colleagues Stuart Piggott and Nowell Myres. In 1937 her only child, Nicholas, was born.

In 1938 Hawkes's first book, The Archaeology of Jersey, was published – it was the second work in a series on the archaeology of the Channel Islands that had been begun by Tom Kendrick. As a result of the academic success of the monograph, she was elected as a Fellow of the Society of Antiquaries. In 1939 she travelled to Ireland to supervise the excavation of Harristown Passage Tomb, near Waterford. The excavation was funded by the Office of Public Works Employment Relief Scheme.

== World War II ==
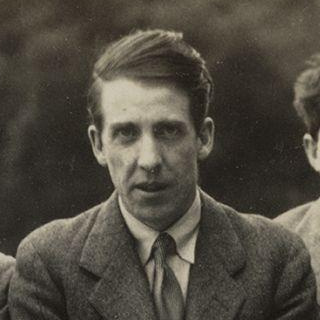
Walter James Redfern Turner portrait by Lady Ottoline Morrell

Hawkes and her son moved to Dorset early in the war, when Britain was facing the threat of invasion. In her memoir A Quest of Love, Hawkes described how, while in Dorset, her "violent emotional involvement with a woman" was "a sudden undamning of feelings of an intensity that I did not know I possessed". Her biographer, Christine Finn, characterised this affair as leaving Hawkes "emotionally confused". The writer Robert Macfarlane described Hawkes as "bisexual through much of the 1930s".

During the latter half of the Blitz Hawkes returned to London and began work in the civil service. To begin with she was involved with moving items from the British Museum to Aldwych tube station for safe-keeping. She began work in 1941 as Assistant Principal of the Post-War Reconstruction Secretariat. Her next post, begun in 1943 and one she held until 1949, was in the Ministry of Education, where she became Secretary of the UK National Committee for UNESCO. In her work in the Ministry of Education she was editor-in-chief of the film unit, where she commissioned and produced The Beginning of History – an early attempt to present prehistory on film.

Whilst working for the government she continued to publish, including Prehistoric Britain (1944, co-authored with her then husband, Christopher Hawkes), and Early Britain (1945). Prehistoric Britain was used by many students in the 1940s and 1950s and underwent several editions and reprints.

During the war she met the poet Walter J. Turner, with whom she had an extra-marital affair. Turner died of a brain haemorrhage in 1946 and Hawkes was grief-stricken. Inspired by Turner's writing and their love, she published her only poetry collection Symbols and Speculations in 1948. It recalled, through poetry, both mystical and physical experiences in her archaeological career.

During her time as Secretary, a major task was the preparations for UNESCO's first conference, which was held in Mexico City in 1947. One of the UK representatives was her future husband, J. B. Priestley, although Hawkes initially opposed his inclusion. However, at the conference Hawkes and Priestley fell in love. Priestley famously described Hawkes's demeanour as "Ice without! Fire within!"

== Festival of Britain ==
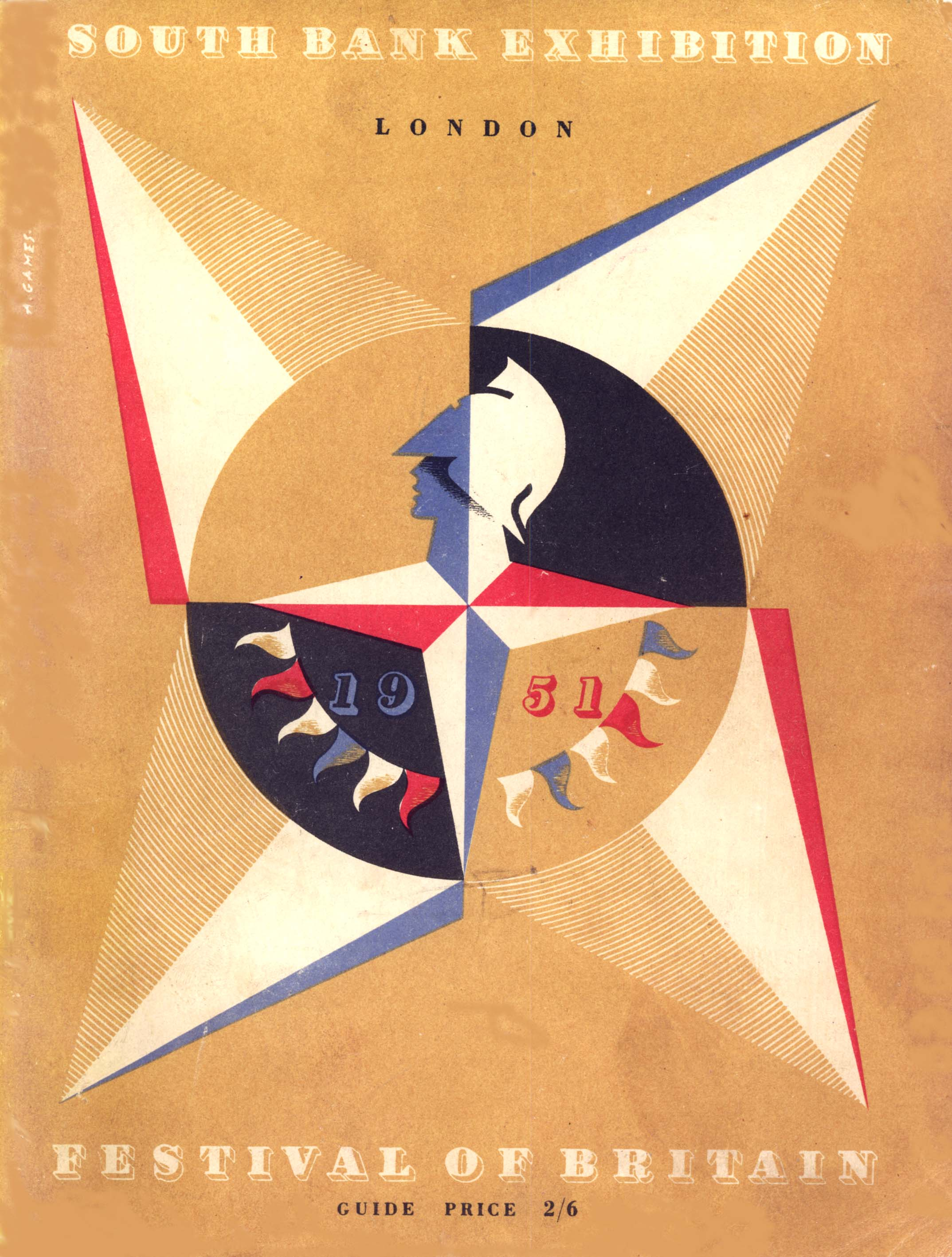
Festival of Britain poster

In 1949 Hawkes left the civil service, in order to work full-time as a writer. She was interested in communicating archaeology and art in new ways to new audiences, including through writing creatively and through film. In 1950 the British Film Institute made her a governor. Writing with empathy, in what became termed the 'archaeological imagination', was central to her practice.

One of her first creative projects was as archaeological advisor to the Festival of Britain in 1951, where she produced the 'People of Britain' pavilion. The pavilion's architect was H. T. Cadbury Brown and it was designed by James Gardner. The vision of the pavilion created by Hawkes showed archaeological sites as if they were being discovered for the first time, proceeding chronologically from a prehistoric burial, to a Bronze Age gold necklace, to a Roman mosaic floor. After the Roman section, visitors met a recreation of the Sutton Hoo ship burial.

== A Land (1951) ==
Published one month after the opening of the Festival of Britain, and perhaps Hawkes's most widely recognised work, A Land (1951) characterised the archaeology of Britain, and thus the story of Britishness, as one of repeated waves of migration. The book was illustrated by Henry Moore. Reviewed on its publication in The Journal of Geology as "literary expression ... rather than scientific description", even Hawkes was aware that it was a difficult book to classify. Nevertheless, a review by Harold Nicolson helped to boost its popularity where he described "the weird beauty in this prophetic book ... it is written with a passion of love and hate". Described by geographer Hayden Lorimer, in 2012, as "an unconventional geological history", it was a bestseller in the UK and was described in the same year, by Robert Macfarlane, as "one of the defining British non-fiction books of the postwar decade."

In 1952 Hawkes was awarded an OBE.

== Marriage to J. B. Priestley ==
Hawkes (left) and J. B. Priestley, 1953

Jacquetta and Christopher Hawkes divorced in 1953; she married Priestley the same year. They lived on the Isle of Wight, before moving to Alveston, Warwickshire, in 1960. During their marriage, they collaborated on a number of experimental literary works, including the play Dragon's Mouth, and an epistolary work entitled Journey Down a Rainbow, based on imagined letters. Priestley's letters in the work were set in a "brash new America in Texas", whilst Hawkes's were written from the perspectives of indigenous societies in New Mexico.

== Research in the 1950s ==
The script for the 1953 film Figures in a Landscape, a documentary about the work of Barbara Hepworth, was written by Hawkes. In 1956 she began excavations on the Mottistone Estate, whose land adjoined her and Priestley's home of Brook Hill House. The subject of Hawkes's investigation was The Longstone; her research, which was published in Antiquity, demonstrated that it was the remains of the entrance to a Neolithic long barrow.

== Activism ==
=== Campaign for Nuclear Disarmament ===
Politically engaged, in late 1957 and early 1958 she and Priestley were part of a group of co-founders of the Campaign for Nuclear Disarmament (CND). CND officially launched at Central Hall, Westminster, on 17 February 1958. Its institutional origins have been described as an "elite pressure group", established as a "gathering" between peers, such as Bertrand Russell, George Kennan, Denis Healey and other public figures, who all knew each other. Hawkes organised an influential meeting early on at Sandown Pavilion, which promoted CND on the Isle of Wight. A member of the executive committee, Hawkes was active at the first Aldermaston March held on 4–7 April 1958. In 1959 she led a march of over 15,000 people to Downing Street where she presented a "Ban the Bomb" charter. Despite this Hawkes characterised the work of CND as a "moral crusade" rather than a political one. She also founded the Women's Committee of CND.

=== Homosexual Law Reform Society ===
Hawkes was active in campaigning for the decriminalisation of gay sex through the Homosexual Law Reform Society (HLRS), of which she was a founding member. Its establishment was announced by a letter in The Times. Committee meetings were held at her and Priestley's flat – B4 Albany – which led to its use as the name for the Albany Trust. The trust was founded in 1958 to support the charitable work of the HLRS and Hawkes was a trustee along with Anthony Edward Dyson, Kenneth Walker, Andrew Hallidie Smith and Ambrose Appelbe. The group, all "ostensibly heterosexual" according to David Minto, aimed to challenge societal attitudes to homosexuality through "objectivity".

=== Campaign for the Preservation of Rural England ===
After Hawkes and Priestley moved to Alveston, Warwickshire, in the early 1960s, she became President of the Warwickshire branch of the Campaign for the Preservation of Rural England and a trustee of the Shakespeare Birthplace Trust.

== Archaeological work in the 1960s ==
Her archaeological research continued, co-editing with Leonard Woolley UNESCO's book on prehistory entitled History of Mankind, which was published in 1963. Hawkes was responsible for writing the sections on the Paleolithic and Neolithic, whereas Woolley's approach renounced the global and he wrote on the Bronze Age in the area that was then termed "the Fertile Crescent". Reviewed by Dutch archaeologist Sigfried J. De Laet, Hawkes's writing style was praised as was her emphasis on a "global" prehistory; however some of the factual information she included was accused of being out of date.

In 1968 she published Dawn of the Gods, which examined Minoan civilisation, and argued that it was a "feminine" society. Hawkes was one of the archaeologists who first proposed that women were the rulers of the ancient Minoans; the idea had been discussed previously by historians of culture and religion, such as Joseph Campbell, and it had also been discussed as part of feminist discourse. She used evidence from art to argue that the society was matriarchal: "the absence of these manifestations of the all-powerful male ruler that are so widespread at this time and in this stage of cultural development as to be almost universal, is one of the reasons for supposing that the occupants of Minoan thrones may have been queens". Reviewed by Frank Stubbings, he praised the book, describing how "the writer remembers always that these were real human beings"; however, he also had several caveats – some on questions of dating, but most of all on account of the poetic language used by Hawkes. Archaeologist Nicoletta Momigliano has placed Hawkes's Dawn of the Gods as part of a canon of 1960s "pacifist and hippie interpretations" that were influenced by Jungian psychology.

Also in 1968, Hawkes published a paper in Antiquity entitled "The Proper Study of Mankind". In it, she argued against an over-emphasis on science in archaeological discourse. The paper was widely debated, with archaeologist D. P. Agrawal suggesting in 1970 that her article was the "protests of a passing generation" and that it contributed to polemicisation of the field. In 1973, James Feibleman challenged her interpretation of archaeological science as reductionist.

== Later life ==
In 1971, Hawkes was elected vice-president of the Council for British Archaeology in recognition of her life's work. In 1980 she published A Quest of Love, a creative memoir of her romantic and sexual life, where she imagined herself as different women across time, from a Palaeolithic shaman called Jakka to a Victorian governess. It was described by the New York Times critic Katha Pollitt as "antifeminist", a "humourless rambling document" and a "masochistic fantasia of the unconscious". John Sutherland in the London Review of Books praised the "candour" of the final section, which discussed her marriages, but was negative overall. However, in a 2018 reappraisal of the work, literary theorist Ina Habermann described it as a "visionary autobiography" and an "overlooked exercise in écriture feminine".

In 1982 she published a biography of Mortimer Wheeler. Reviewed by F. H. Thompson in Antiquity, the biography was criticised for its over-emphasis on, and criticism of, Wheeler's sex life.

Priestley died in 1984. After his death Hawkes moved to Chipping Camden and continued her interests in archaeology and science, particularly ornithology. Her last publication, The Shell Guide to British Archaeology, was co-written with archaeologist Paul Bahn and published in 1986. Noted for her striking looks, she was the subject of the work of several photographers during her lifetime, including Lord Snowdon, Bern Schwartz, Mark Gerson, J. S. Lewinski and Tara Heinemann.

== Death and legacy ==
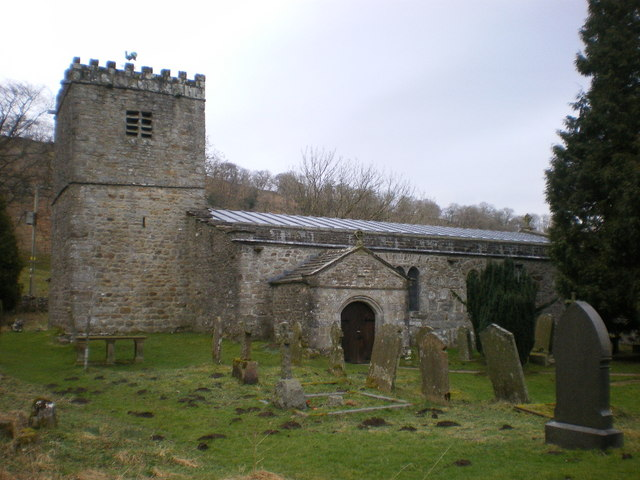
St Michael and All Angels' Church, Hubberholme, North Yorkshire

Hawkes died in Cheltenham on 18 March 1996. Cremated, her ashes are interred with Priestley's at an unknown location in the churchyard of the Church of St Michael and All Angels, Hubberholme, North Yorkshire. However, their presence there is commemorated with a plaque on the church.

Whilst Hawkes's views and writing may have been too "poetic" for the archaeological establishment, particularly in the context of processual archaeology's popularity in the later mid-twentieth century, in the twenty-first century her writing found new audiences, with a re-issue of A Land in 2012 with a new foreword by nature writer and academic Robert Macfarlane. Hawkes's artistic, poetic and humanitarian approach to archaeology has been termed "creative archaeology" by biographer Christine Finn.

=== Archive ===
Special Collections at the University of Bradford holds her archive, which contains diaries, letters, photographs, notebooks, drafts, unpublished works, school reports and nature diaries.

=== Exhibitions ===
Exhibitions inspired by Hawkes's life and works include:

- Christine Finn: Back to a Land (2012), an exhibition at Yorkshire Sculpture Park by biographer and artist Christine Finn.
- Pots Before Words (2014), an exhibition of work by artist Kate Morrell at the University of Bradford, explored Hawkes's archive. Morrell submitted work from this exhibition for the Jerwood Drawing Prize.
- The Sun Went in, the Fire Went Out (2016), an exhibition by artists Annabel Nicolson, Carlyle Reedy and Marie Yates at Chelsea College of Art.
- Isle of Wight: Hidden Heroes (2018), an exhibition at Carisbrooke Castle highlighting important people in the history of the Isle of Wight.

== Selected works ==
=== Books ===
- Hawkes, Jacquetta. Symbols & Speculations. Cresset Press, 1948.
- Hawkes, Jacquetta. A Land. Cresset Press, 1951.
- Hawkes, Jacquetta. Man and the Sun. Cresset Press, 1963.
- Hawkes, Jacquetta. A Guide to the Prehistoric and Roman Monuments in England and Wales 1951, revised 1973.
- Hawkes, Jacquetta, and Sir Leonard Woolley. History of Mankind. Vol. 1. International Commission for a History of the Scientific and Cultural Development of Mankind, 1963.
- Hawkes, Jacquetta. Pharaohs of Egypt. American Heritage Publishing Co., Inc., 1965.
- Hawkes, Jacquetta. Dawn of the Gods. Chatto & Windus, 1968.
- Hawkes, Jacquetta. The First Great Civilizations: Life in Mesopotamia, the Indus Valley and Egypt. Hutchinson, 1973. The History of Human Society series.
- Hawkes, Jacquetta. Mortimer Wheeler: Adventurer in Archaeology. St Martin's Press, 1982.

=== Articles ===
- Hawkes, Jacquetta (1935). "The Place Origin of Windmill Hill Culture". Proceedings of the Prehistoric Society. 1: 127–9.
- Hawkes, Jacquetta (1938). "The Significance of Channelled Ware in Neolithic Western Europe". The Archaeological Journal. 95 (1): 126–173.
- Hawkes, Jacquetta (1941). "Excavation of a Megalithic Tomb at Harristown, Co. Waterford". Journal of the Royal Society of Antiquaries of Ireland. 11 (4): 130–47.
- Hawkes, Jacquetta (1951). "A Quarter Century of Antiquity". Antiquity. 25 (100): 171–3.
- Hawkes, Jacquetta (1968). "The Proper Study of Mankind". Antiquity. 62: 252–66.
