= St Mary's Church, Brook =

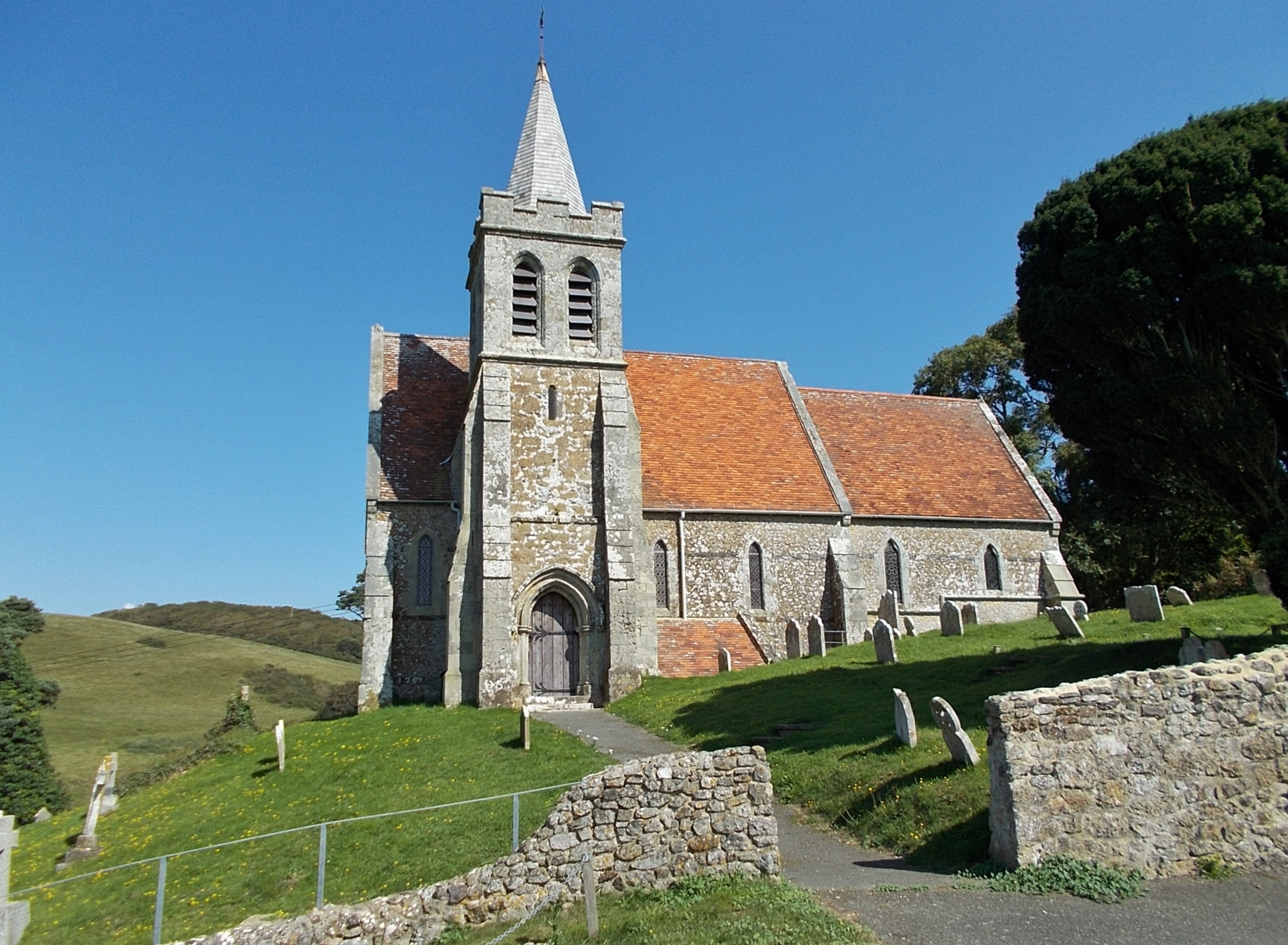
- St Mary's Church, Brook
- 50°39′29″N 01°26′33″W
- OS grid reference: SZ 39468 84392
- Country: England
- Denomination: Church of England
- Churchmanship: Broad Church

History
- Dedication: St Mary

Administration
- Province: Canterbury
- Diocese: Portsmouth
- Parish: Brook, Isle of Wight

Clergy
- Vicar: Revd Malcolm Williams

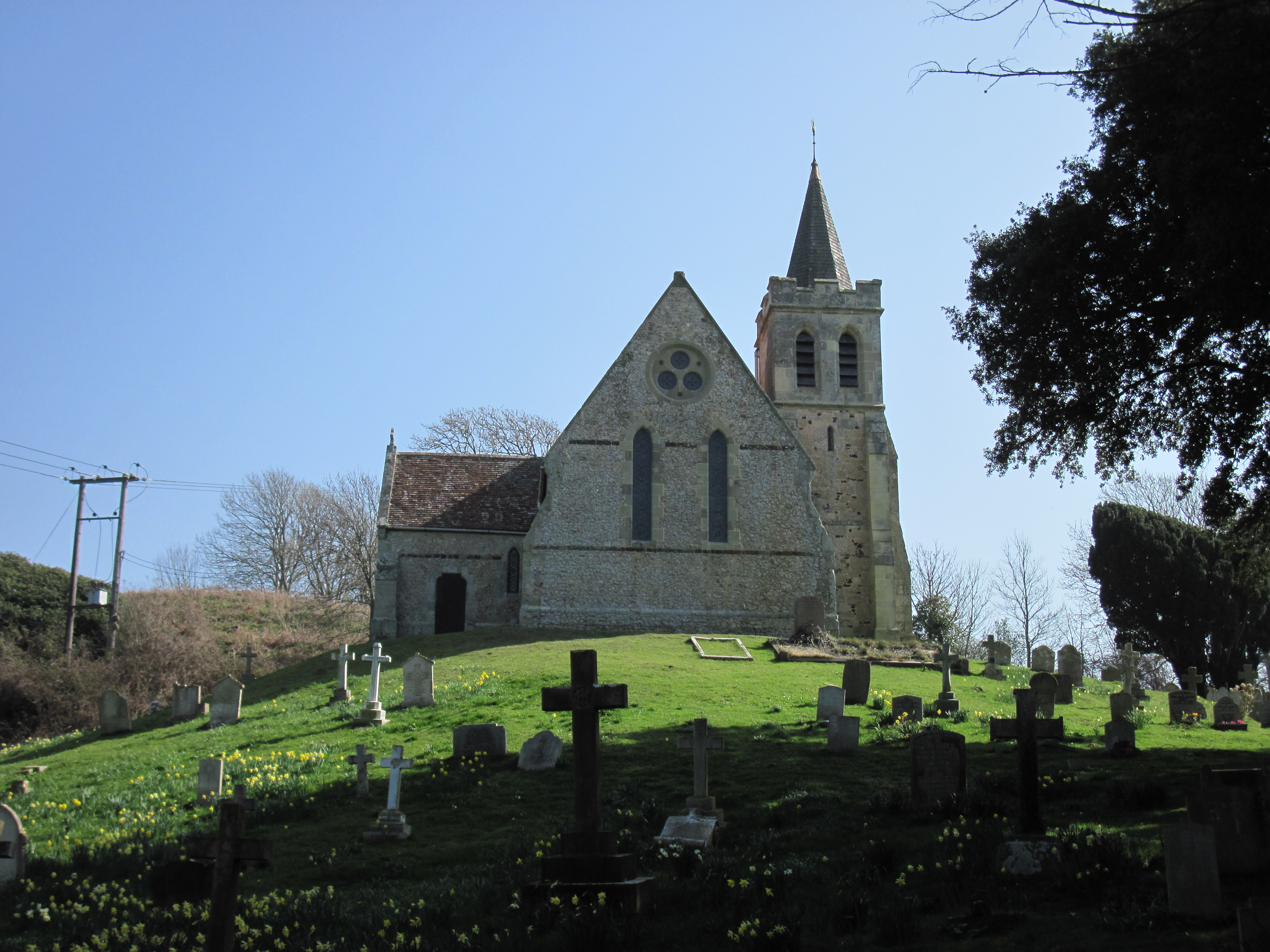
West face of the church

St Mary's Church, Brook is a parish church in the Church of England located in Brook, Isle of Wight.

== History ==
The current church dates from 1864. It is by the architect Willoughby Mullins and was funded by the wealthy landowner and industrialist Charles Seely MP, whose estate contained the village. There are memorials to the family in the church. St Mary's replaced a 13th Century church destroyed in a fire. The arch from the porch to the nave is all that remains of the mediaeval church.

Situated on a knoll just above the village of Brook, St Mary's has been described as "one of the best preserved small Victorian churches in the country." It's "fine interior decorations ... remain in beautiful condition." The interior walls were never plastered and this gave according to the architectural critic, Nicholas Pevsner, a "striking" effect. The small tower contains a set of 8 tubular bells.

The church, and the village below, have also a close association with the Royal National Lifeboat Institution. There were RNLI funded lifeboats in the village of Brook from 1851 through to 1937. The Service Boards for the lifeboats hang in St Mary's, behind the font. The Lifeboats are also commemorated in a memorial at Brook Village Hall.

The churchyard contains six Commonwealth war graves, two British Army soldiers of World War I and, from World War II, three unidentified Merchant Navy seamen whose bodies had been washed ashore. It also contains the grave of Royal Air Force Squadron Leader, Nigel Seely (1902–1943), son of the politician and industrialist Sir Charles Seely, 2nd Baronet.

Col. Harry Gore-Browne VC is also buried in the churchyard. Gore-Browne was the son-in-law of Charles Seely, having married his daughter Jane. He won the Victoria Cross aged 26 during the Indian Mutiny. He later ran the Seely estates in the West Wight.

A memorial to those killed in a 1957 flying boat crash also stands in the churchyard.

== Parish status ==
The church is grouped with:

- St Mary's Church, Brighstone
- St Mary's Church, Brook
- St Peter and St Paul's Church, Mottistone

== Organ ==
The church has a two manual organ dating from 1867 by Bevington. A specification of the organ can be found on the National Pipe Organ Register.
