= George Albert Cairns =

Recipient of the Victoria Cross

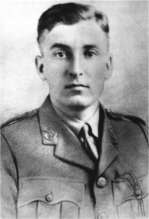
- Lieutenant George Cairns VC in 1944.
- Born: 12 December 1913; London, England
- Died: 19 March 1944 (aged 30); Henu Block, British Burma
- Burial place: Taukkyan War Cemetery
- Military career
- Allegiance: United Kingdom
- Branch: British Army
- Service years: 1942–1944
- Rank: Lieutenant
- Service number: 198196
- Units: Somerset Light Infantry
- Conflicts: Second World War: Pacific War; Burma campaign; Burma campaign 1944 †
- Awards: Victoria Cross

Lieutenant George Albert Cairns VC (12 December 1913 – 19 March 1944) was a British Army officer and an English recipient of the Victoria Cross (VC), the highest award for gallantry in the face of the enemy that can be awarded to British and Commonwealth forces.

== Early life ==
George Albert Cairns was born in London on 12 December 1913 and educated at Sir Henry Compton School Fulham (now Fulham Cross Academy) 1923–1930. He spent the early 1940s in Sidcup, Kent, working at a bank. He met his future wife, Ena, at the same bank. They were married in 1941 and a year later he went to war.

== Details ==
Cairns was a lieutenant in The Somerset Light Infantry (Prince Albert's), British Army, attached to the South Staffordshire Regiment in Burma during the Second World War. The South Staffordshire Regiment was a Chindit battalion, part of 77th Indian Infantry Brigade under the command of Brigadier Michael Calvert. He was 30 years old when he performed the deed for which he was posthumously awarded the Victoria Cross.

On the evening of 16 March 1944, the South Staffords dug in near what would become a main hinge of the Chindit operation, the block at Henu and Mawlu, known as the White City. A nearby hill crowned with a Pagoda dominated the horizon. It was not occupied by the British or, so far as those present could tell, by the Japanese. The following morning a number of unsuspecting Japanese soldiers were discovered in the area. It was plain that the South Staffords had dug in their positions adjacent to a small Japanese force without either learning of the other's presence. At about 11:00am, the hill erupted with enemy fire.

Calvert, who led the attack in person, wrote "On the top of Pagoda Hill, not much bigger than two tennis courts, an amazing scene developed. The small white Pagoda was in the centre of the hill. Between that and the slopes which came up was a mêlée of South Staffords and Japanese bayonetting, fighting with each other, with some Japanese just throwing grenades from the flanks into the mêlée." Calvert added, "there, at the top of the hill, about fifty yards square, an extraordinary mêlée took place, everyone shooting, bayoneting, kicking at everyone else, rather like an officers' guest night."

During the attack Cairns was attacked by a Japanese officer who with his sword hacked off the lieutenant's left arm. Cairns killed the officer and retrieved the fallen sword before wounding several other Japanese. He subsequently collapsed and perished the following day. Calvert wrote, "[i]n front I saw Lieut. Cairns have his harm hacked off by a Jap, whom he shot. He picked up the sword and carried on. Finally we drove them back behind the Pagoda".

Lieutenant Norman Durant, commanding one of South Staffordshire Regiment’s machine gun platoons, was involved in the action on Pagoda Hill. He described the action in a long letter to his family:

The first thing I saw on reaching the path was horrible hand-to-hand struggle going on further up the hill. George Cairns and a Jap were struggling and choking on the ground, and as I picked up a Jap rifle and climbed up towards them I saw George break free and, picking up a rifle bayonet, stab the Jap again and again like a madman. It was only when I got near that I saw he himself had already been bayoneted twice through the side and that his left arm was hanging on by a few strips of muscle. How he had found the strength to fight was a miracle, but the effort had been too much and he died the next morning.

After a brief "intermission," Calvert’s forces broke the Japanese resistance, driving them from the area:

The fighting had been not unlike that depicted un scenes from ancient battles in the closeness of the hand-to-hand grappling before the Japs finally broke. In spite of our casualties, we hard all that elation of the winners of a good battle, especially of a bayonet charge…I spoke to Lieut. Cairns before he died. 'Have we won sir? Was it all right? Did we do our stuff? Don't worry about me.' Five years later His Majesty graciously awarded Lieut. Cairns the Victoria Cross…We counted forty-two Jap dead, including four officers. More were shot and killed or wounded by our machine guns as they struggled across the open paddy, with the Japs giving them some covering fire from Mawlu, 800 yards across the paddy on to Pagoda Hill.

Cairns's batman, Private N. Coales wrote "He died a hero."

== Aftermath ==
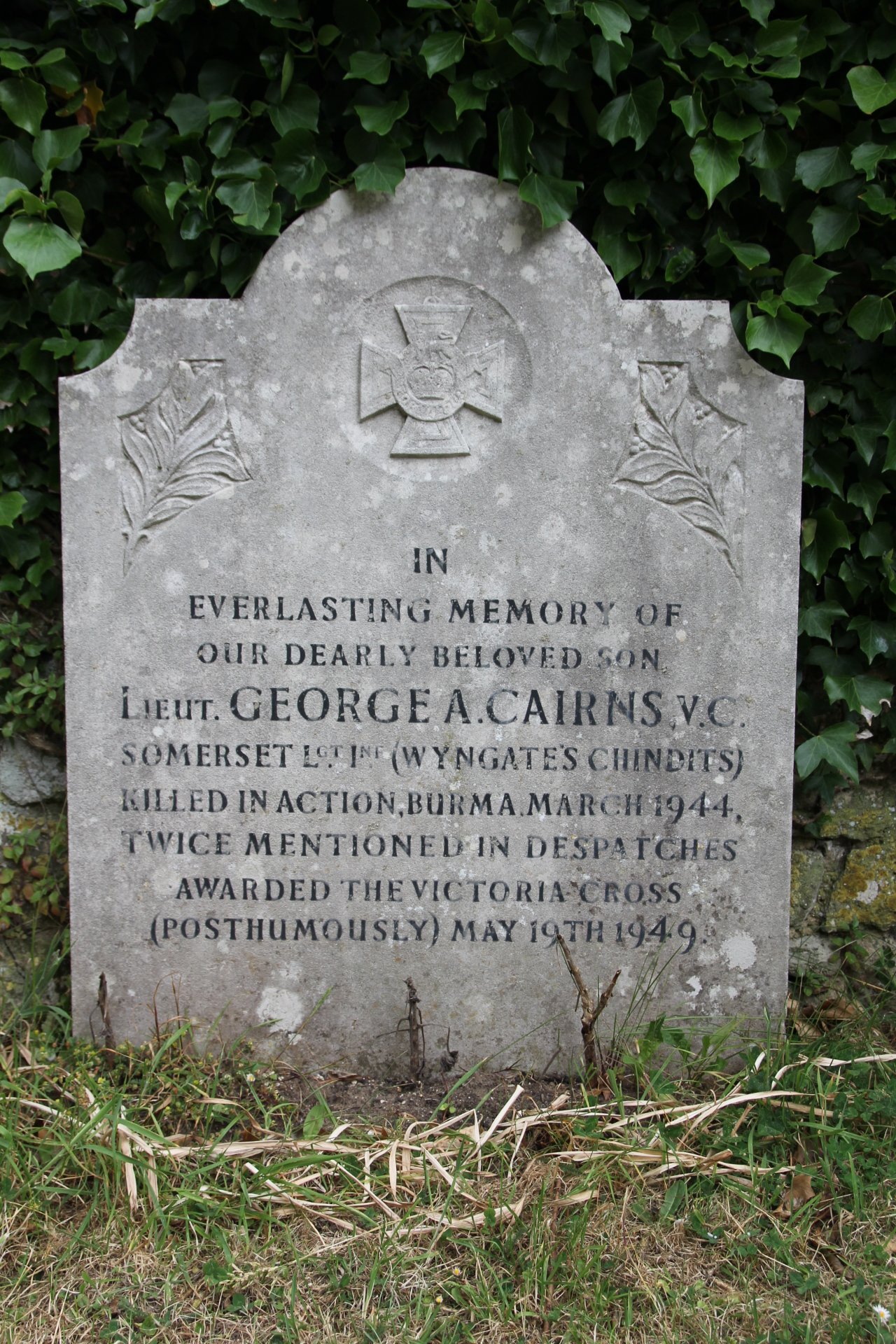
Memorial stone in Brighstone churchyard.

Cairns was buried at Taukkyan War Cemetery in Burma. His grave is located at Plot 6, Row A, Grave 4. A stone memorial similar to a headstone commemorates Cairns at St Mary the Virgin Church, Brighstone, Isle of Wight.

Cairns' VC was the last to be gazetted for the Second World War as the original recommendation was with General Wingate when he was killed in an air crash. The recommendation was revived following a BBC broadcast of Cairns' actions in December 1948. According to an article published in the Times Saturday 21 May 1949:

The original recommendation for the award of the V.C. to Lieutenant Cairns was submitted to the late General Wingate after the usual evidence of three witnesses had been checked. The aircraft carrying General Wingate and the records crashed, the general being killed and all the records destroyed. Later, when the proposal was retrieved, it was found that two of the three witnesses had been killed and this led to further delay. Some six weeks ago the former Brigade Commander of the 77th Brigade (now Major Calvert) had the case reopened. Meanwhile, after listening to a broadcast in which her husband's bravery was mentioned, Mrs. Cairns, who lives at Sidcup, approached her M.P., Mr. G. D. Wallace, who made representations to the War Office on her behalf.

Wallace told the Daily Telegraph that he "hoped [approaching the war office] would mean recognition not only for her husband but for herself and the grand fight she had put up." Cairns's wife, Ena Cairns, continued to work in the bank where she had first met her husband. The Victoria Cross citation, published in The London Gazette reads:

The KING has been graciously pleased to approve the posthumous award of the VICTORIA CROSS to:—

Lieutenant George Albert CAIRNS (198186), The Somerset Light Infantry, attd. South Staffordshire Regiment.

On 5 March 1944, 77 Independent Infantry Brigade, of which the 1st South Staffordshire Regiment formed a part, landed by glider at Broadway (Burma).

On 12 March 1944, columns from the South Staffordshire Regiment and 3/6 Gurkha Rifles established a road and rail block across the Japanese lines of communication at Henu Block.

The Japanese counter-attacked this position heavily in the early morning of 13 March 1944, and the South Staffordshire Regiment was ordered to attack a hill-top which formed the basis of the Japanese attack.

During this action, in which Lieutenant CAIRNS took a foremost part, he was attacked by a Japanese officer, who, with his sword, hacked off Lieutenant CAIRNS [sic] left arm. Lieutenant CAIRNS killed this Officer; picked up the sword and continued to lead his men in the attack and slashing left and right with the captured sword killed and wounded several Japanese before he himself fell to the ground.

Lieutenant CAIRNS subsequently died from his wounds. His action so inspired all his comrades that, later the Japanese were completely routed, a very rare occurrence at that time.

Cairns's Victoria Cross is displayed at the Museum of the Staffordshire Regiment in Whittington, Staffordshire.
