= St Mary's Church, Brighstone =

Coordinates: 50°38′32.6″N 01°23′40.5″W

St. Mary's Church, Brighstone
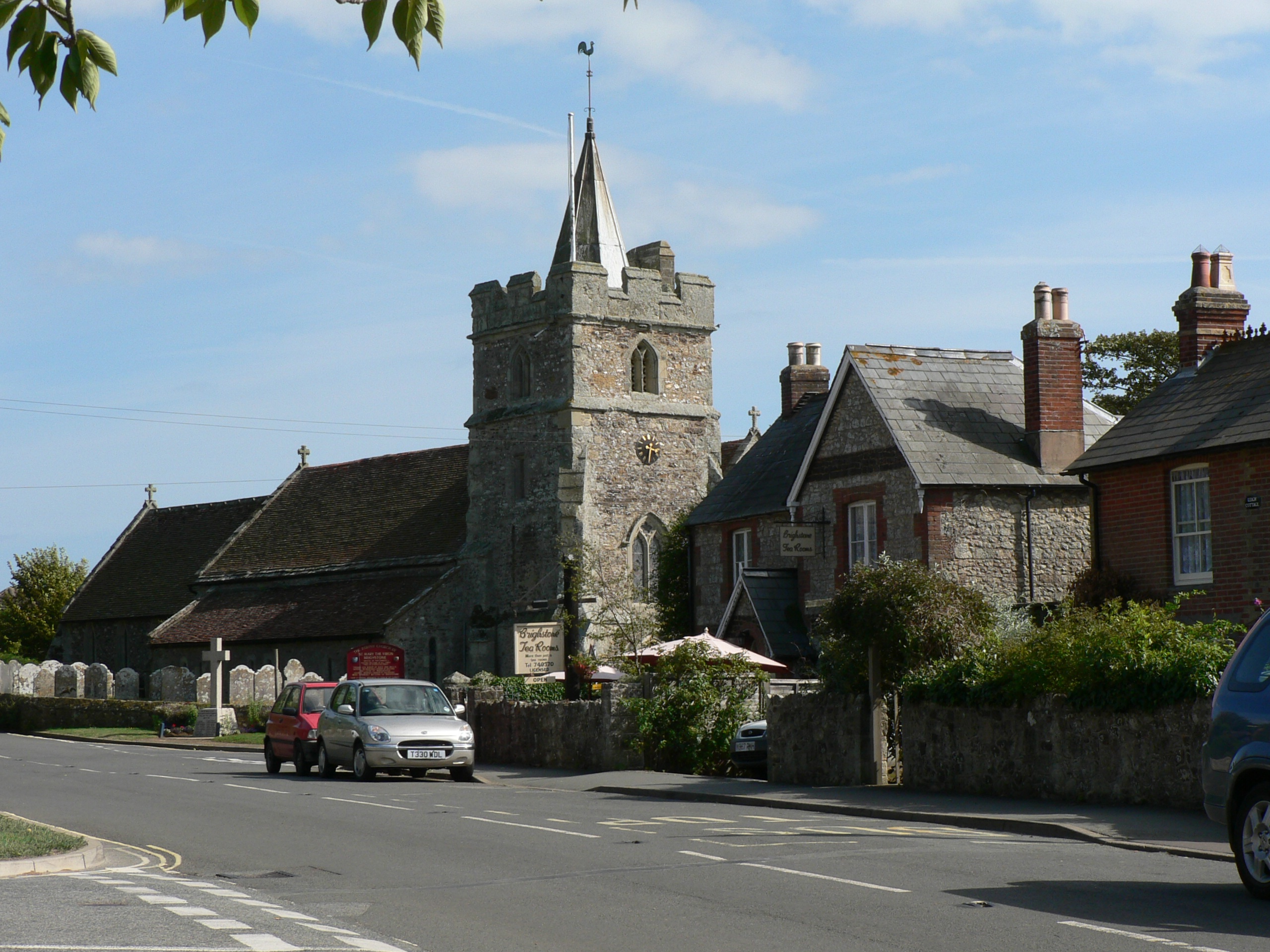
- St. Mary's Church, Brighstone
- St. Mary's Church, Brighstone
- Denomination: Church of England
- Churchmanship: Broad Church

History
- Dedication: St. Mary

Administration
- Province: Canterbury
- Diocese: Portsmouth
- Parish: Brighstone

Clergy
- Vicar: Revd Jackie Maw

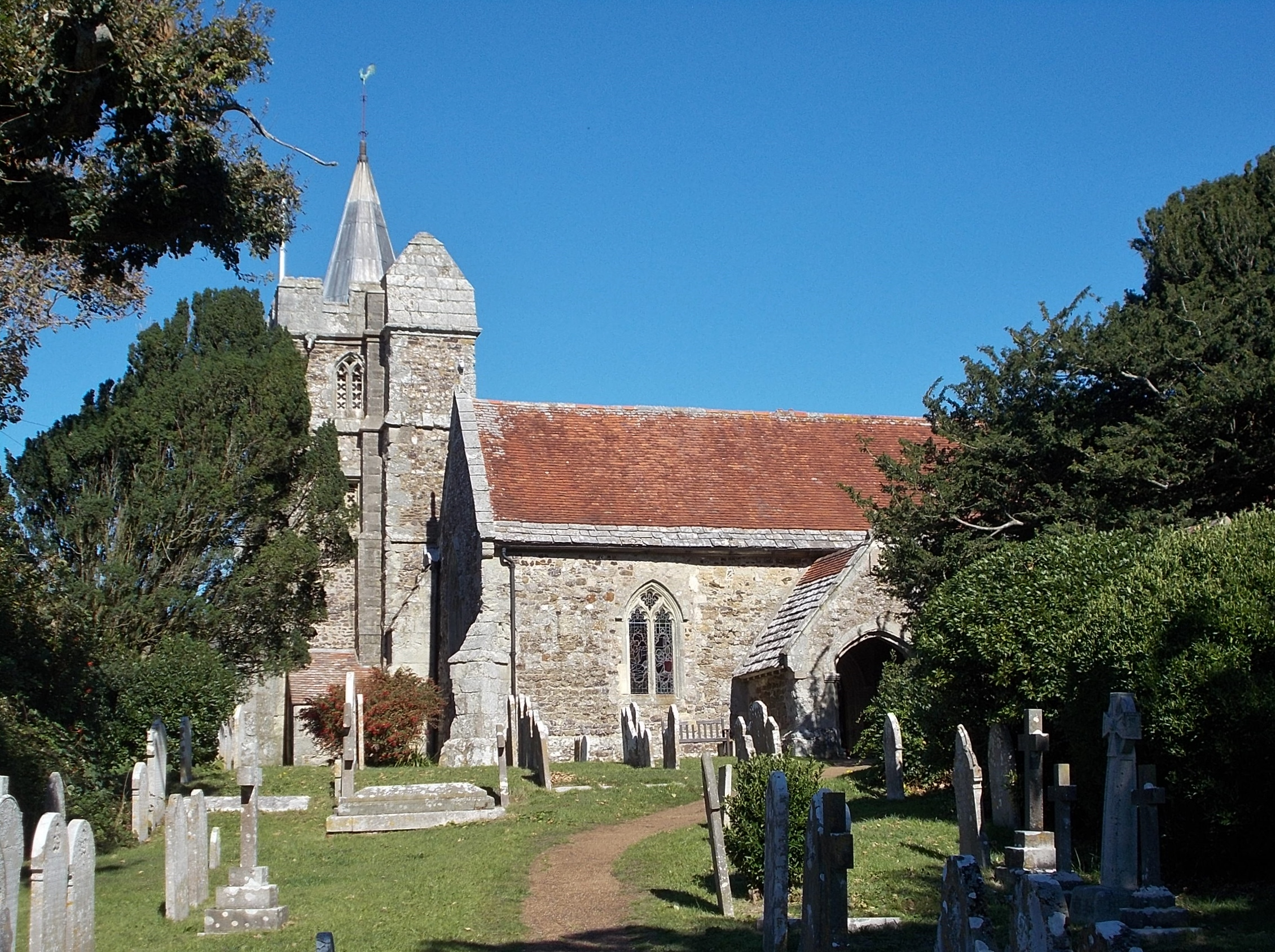
South face of the church.

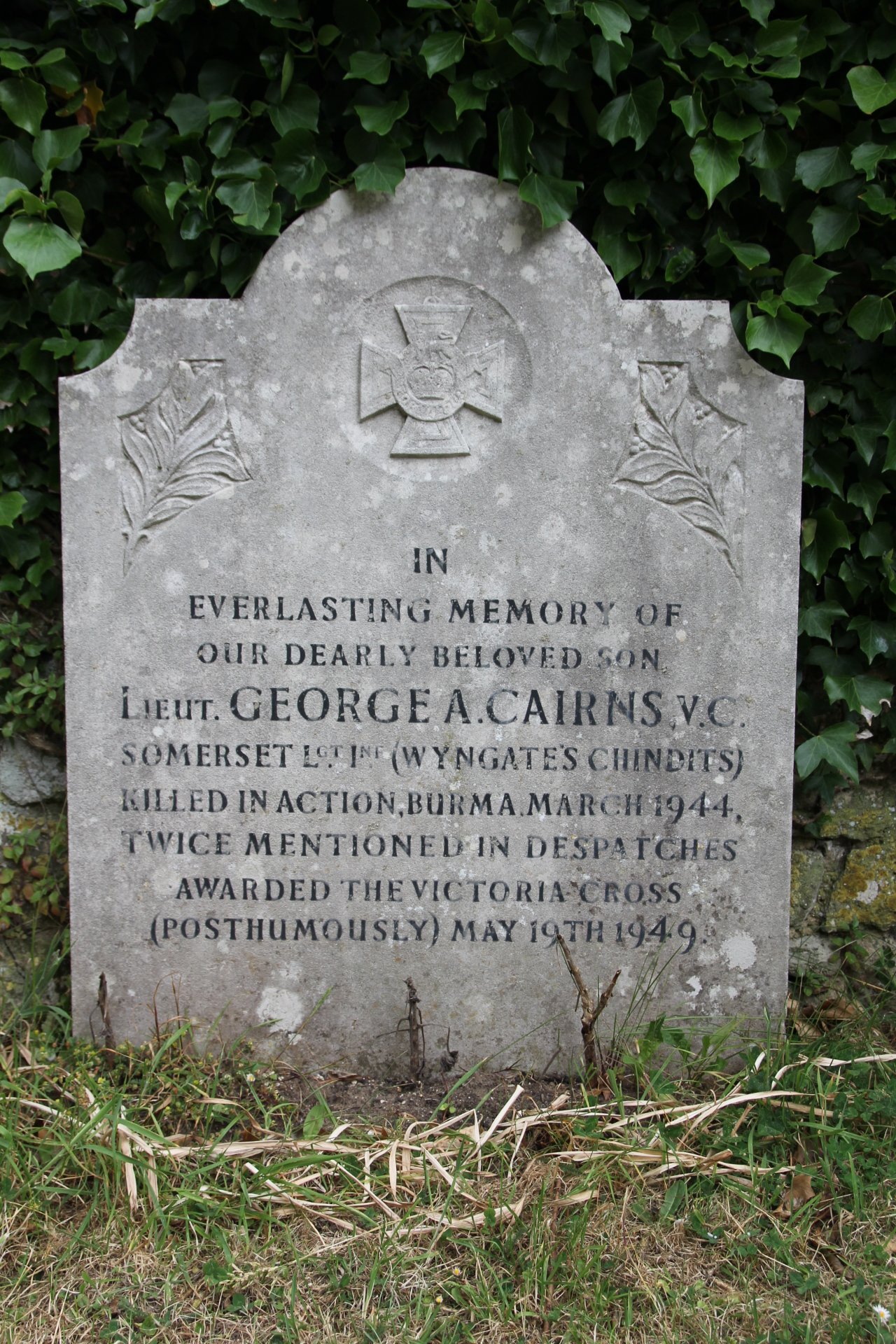
Memorial to George Cairns VC.

St. Mary's Church is a parish church in the Church of England located in Brighstone, Isle of Wight. The churchyard contains a memorial stone to George Albert Cairns VC.

== History ==
The church is medieval dating from the twelfth century. The short tower contains a ring of 8 bells all cast by Whitechapel Bell Foundry: six in 1961 with two more added in 2017. The largest weighs 7cwt. The spire was added in the 17th century.

== Today ==
The church holds an annual Christmas tree festival (the Brighstone Christmas Tree Festival) in conjunction with the one at Mottistone that has become a popular tourist attraction.

This event occurs in four locations:

- St Mary's Church, Brighstone
- Brighstone Methodist Church
- St. Peter and St. Paul's Church, Mottistone
- Wilberforce Hall, Brighstone.

Several hundred entries are created by individuals, groups and businesses, making it one of the biggest festivals of its type.

== Parish status ==
The church is grouped with:

- St. Mary's Church, Brighstone
- St. Mary's Church, Brook
- St. Peter and St. Paul's Church, Mottistone

== List of incumbents ==
Three former Rectors have become Bishops:

- Thomas Ken hymn writer
- Samuel Wilberforce - the youngest son of William Wilberforce
- George Moberly - became Bishop of Salisbury

== Organ ==
The church does not have a pipe organ but instead has an electric one at the west end of the nave. A specification of the former pipe organ can be found on the National Pipe Organ Register.
