= Brighstone Christmas Tree Festival =

Annual festival on the Isle of Wight, England

Brighstone Christmas Tree Festival is a local event occurring in various venues around Brighstone and Mottistone on the Isle of Wight in England for the winter tourist season. This charitable event raises money for local and national charities.

== History ==
The Brighstone Christmas Tree Festival began in 1997 and has since been able to raise nearly £100,000 for Island and national charities. The festivities traditionally start on a Wednesday with a tree lighting ceremony in Brighstone Church in aid of the Earl Mountbatten Hospice. This event has attracted around 6,500 tourists each year.

== Locations ==
The annual festival is held at St. Mary's Church, the Methodist Church, the Wilberforce Hall, the Social Club and the Three Bishops Pub in Brighstone, The Isle of Wight Pearl on the Military Rd and at St. Peter and St. Paul's Church in nearby Mottistone. A Park & Ride system is in place and operates from the Isle of Wight Pearl bringing people into Brighstone where a further shuttle service conveys people to Mottistone and back.

== Festivities ==
The highlight of the celebration is the showcasing of over 200 theme decorated Christmas trees exhibited by charities, associations, businesses, families, and individuals. The festivities include carol services, military band concerts, choir singing, and the lighting of the hospice tree, which marks the beginning of the four-day event. There is also a Christmas gift and craft fair. Admission is free but donations are requested.

== Entries ==
Entries are created and displayed by charities, clubs, schools, individuals, groups, and businesses, making this one of the biggest Christmas festivals in England. The churches are decorated, and banners put up across the Back of the Wight.

Many organisations, such as the National Health Service, RSPCA, and local charities, use their trees to give information, appeal for money, or raise awareness.
