= Hulverstone =

Hamlet on the Isle of Wight, England

Coordinates: 50°39′16″N 1°26′19″W

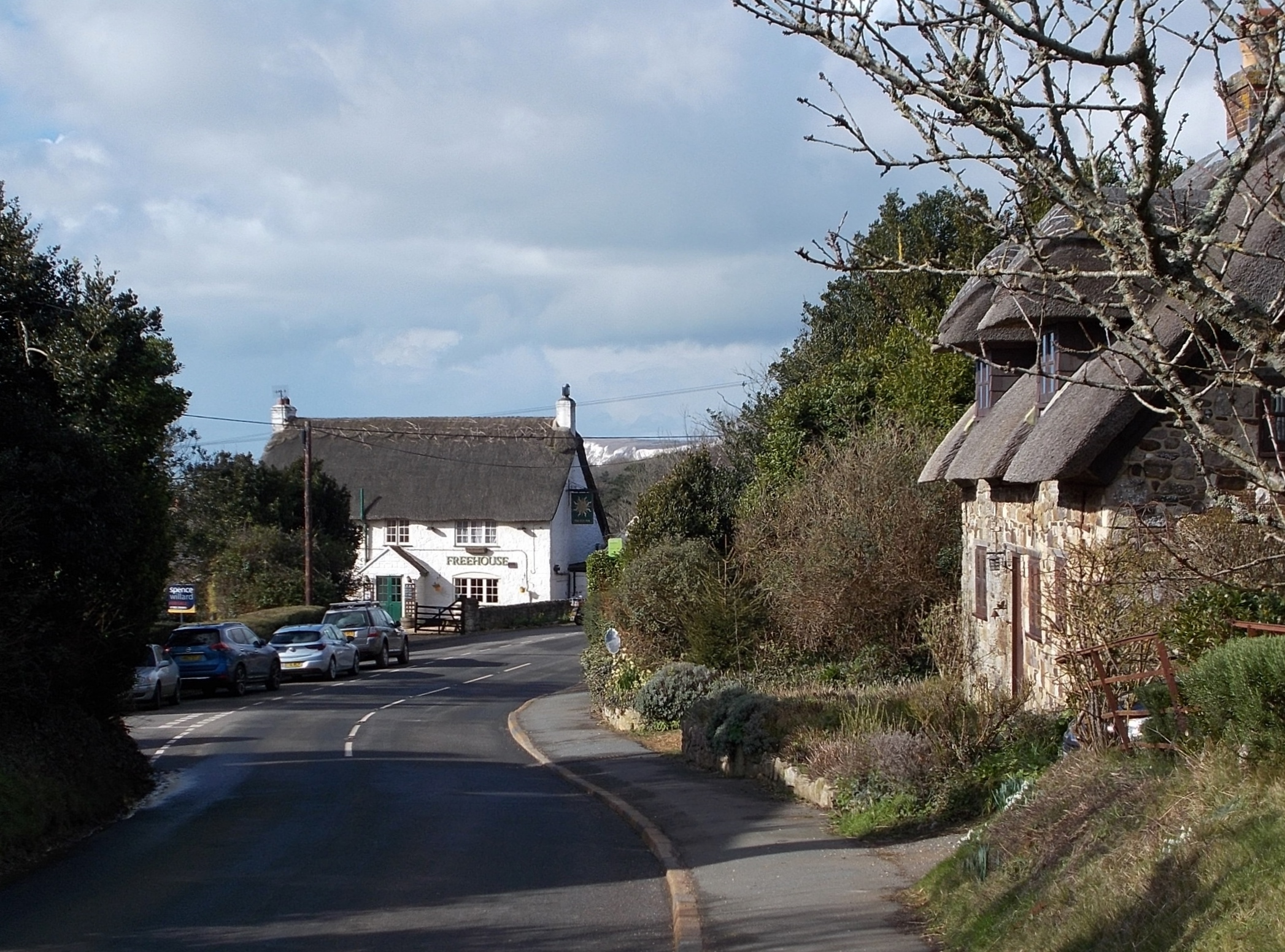
Hulverstone

Hulverstone is a hamlet of about 12 houses on the Isle of Wight on the edge of the English Channel. It has a post office in a private home and the 400-year-old Sun Inn. Sun Inn was used in smuggling operations. There is a school in Hulverstone in a private home that had been a barn before it was converted in the mid-19th century by Charles Seely. According to the Post Office the population of the hamlet at the 2011 Census was included in the civil parish of Brighstone.

== Name ==
The name means 'the farmstead or estate belonging to a man called Hūnfrith', from Old English Hūnfrith (personal name) and tūn. In the Domesday Book (1086), the manor of Vlvredestune is possibly to do with Hulverstone, and not to do with Wolverton in Shorwell, as the interchange of -n- and -l- is a common characteristic of Anglo-Norman spellings.

~1190: Hunfertheston

~1270: Hunfredestone

1289: Humerderston

1341: Honfredeston

1462: Holverstone

1769: Hulverston

== Amenities ==
There was a Hulverstone farm but it no longer exists. The manor house is still used as a private home, however.

The Chapel Furlong Farm in Hulverstone is the site of a bed and breakfast.

Public transport is provided by Southern Vectis buses on route 12.
