= Claud Raymond =

Recipient of the Victoria Cross

- Born: 2 October 1923; Mottistone, Isle of Wight, England
- Died: 22 March 1945 (aged 21); British Burma
- Burial place: Taukkyan War Cemetery
- Military career
- Allegiance: United Kingdom
- Branch: British Army
- Service years: 1943–1945 †
- Rank: Lieutenant
- Units: Royal Engineers
- Conflicts: World War II: Pacific War; Burma campaign; Burma campaign 1945 (DOW)
- Awards: Victoria Cross

Claud Raymond VC (2 October 1923 – 22 March 1945) was a British recipient of the Victoria Cross, the highest and most prestigious award for gallantry in the face of the enemy that can be awarded to British and Commonwealth forces. As a member of an old County Kerry family with strong links to the Indian Army, Raymond is also regarded as an Irish VC.

== Details ==
Claud Raymond was the son of Lieutenant Colonel Maurice Claud Raymond CIE, MC, and Margaret Lilias Nancy Raymond (née Brown), of Fulham. He was 21 years old, and a Lieutenant in the Corps of Royal Engineers, British Army during the Second World War when the following deed took place for which he was awarded the VC.

On 21 March 1945 at Talaku, Burma (now Myanmar), Lieutenant Raymond was second-in-command of a reconnaissance patrol when they were fired on by a strongly entrenched enemy detachment and the lieutenant at once led his men towards the position. He was first wounded in the shoulder and then in the head, but continued leading his men forward, when he was hit a third time, his wrist being shattered. He still carried on into the enemy defences where he was largely responsible for capturing the position. In spite of the gravity of his wounds, he refused medical aid until all the other wounded had received attention. He died the next day, aged 21.

== Legacy ==
Raymond grew up in Seaford, Sussex, and is remembered on the town's war memorial. A road in the town is also named after him. Raymond was educated at Wellington College, and the Wellington College RFC 3rd XV is nicknamed "the Raymonds" in his honour.

== The Medal ==
His Victoria Cross is displayed at the Royal Engineers Museum in Chatham, Kent.
