= The Longstone, Mottistone =

Neolithic standing stones on the Isle of Wight, England

The Longstone
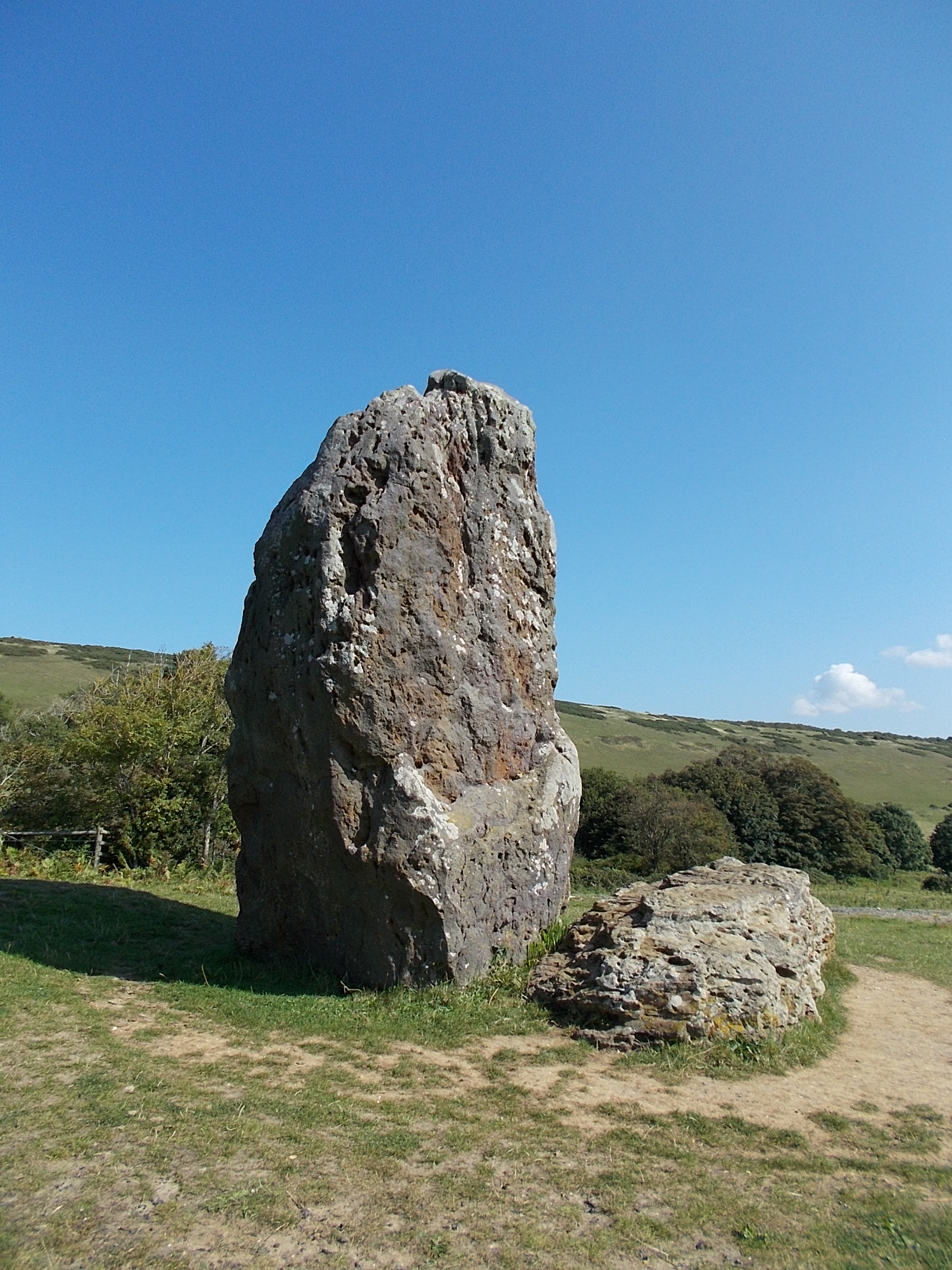
- The Longstone at Mottistone

- Location within Isle of Wight
- 50°39′22″N 1°25′31″W
- Type: Standing stone
- Periods: Neolithic
- Location: Mottistone, Isle of Wight

Scheduled monument

The Longstone is a megalithic monument near the village of Mottistone, in the civil parish of Brighstone, close to the south west coast of the Isle of Wight. It is the only megalithic monument on the Island. On 8 October 1981 it became a scheduled monument listed as "The Longstone: a long barrow 60m south of Longstone Cottage".

== Description and location ==
The Longstone consists of two pieces of local greensand sandstone probably from a vein 100 metres (330 ft) away. The larger stands at 3.9 metres (13 ft) and the smaller lies at its foot. They are on the edge of a wood in small fenced enclosure just off Strawberry Lane, near Mottistone. The name Mottistone (the Speaker's or pleader's stone) almost certainly derives from the Longstone. The stones and the surrounding land are in the care of the National Trust and are open to the public.

Until the mid nineteenth century the smaller stone was further south but in 1856 a local landowner, Charles Dillon, 14th Viscount Dillon, had it turned over to discover if it had a mortise hole (it did not). Its present position has led to fanciful tales of its being a sacrificial altar stone and so, in common with many other megalithic monuments, modern pagan meetings and rituals are associated with it.

In October 2007 the larger stone was vandalised by unknown person(s) who painted the white outline of a Christian cross onto the side facing the smaller.

== Associated long barrow ==
The stones are associated with a narrow mound 21 metres (69 ft) long, which runs from them to the west. In September 1956, excavations by C.N. Hawkes appeared to confirm that this was the remains of a long barrow, so that the stones may be the remains of an entrance. Long barrows in this part of England that are not on chalk or limestone are rare.

== Dating ==
Although dating is difficult, pottery excavated in 1956 indicates that the mound (and therefore probably the stones also) are Neolithic.
