= Limerstone =

Hamlet on the Isle of Wight, England

Coordinates: 50°38′38″N 1°22′35″W

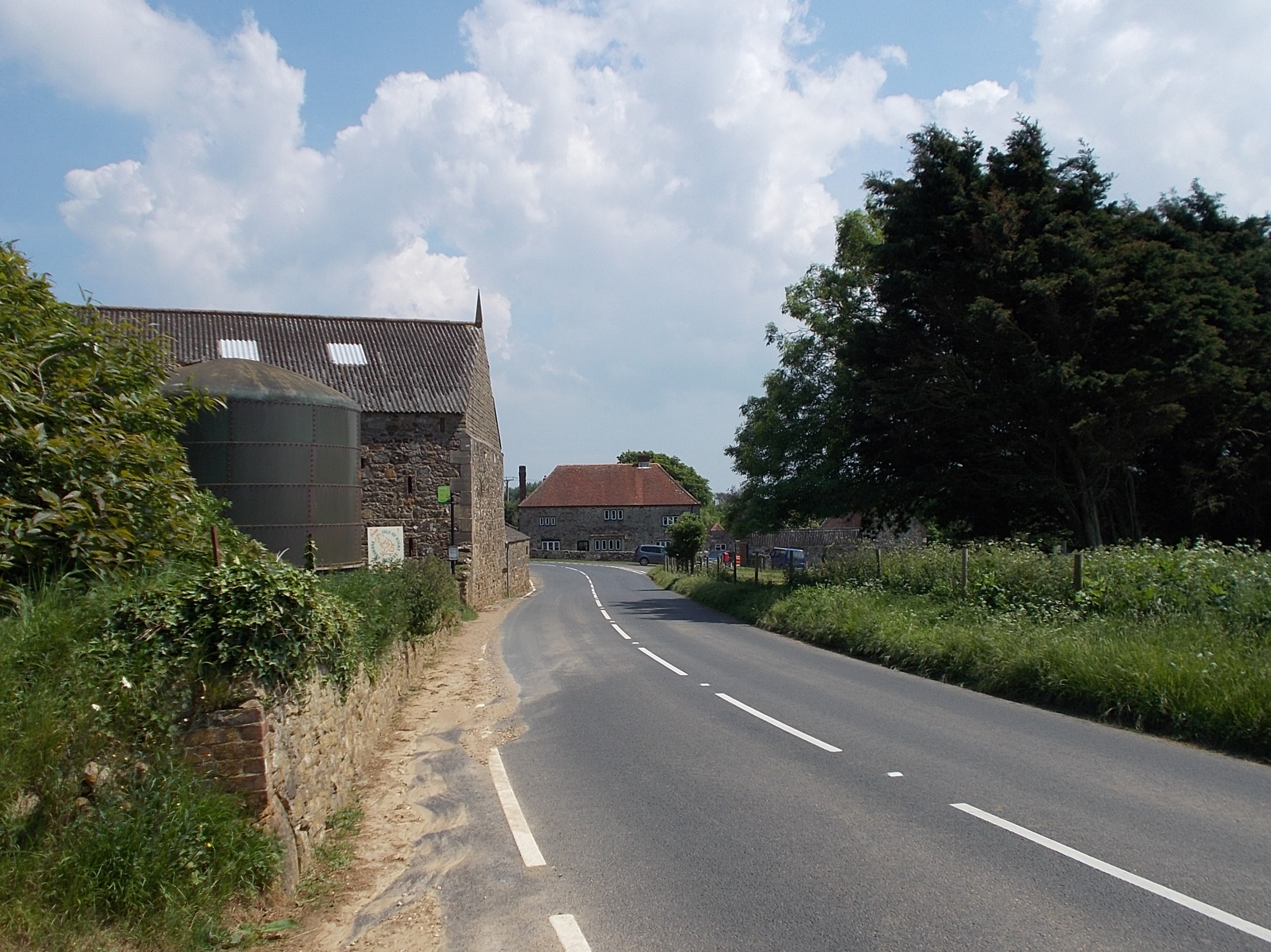
Limerstone

Limerstone is a hamlet on the Isle of Wight in England. It is located on the B3399 road between Brighstone (where the 2011 Census population was listed) and Shorwell, approximately 5 miles (8 km) southwest of Newport. Public transport is provided by Southern Vectis buses on route 12. The hamlet features around 25 houses and a farm, called Limerstone Farm.

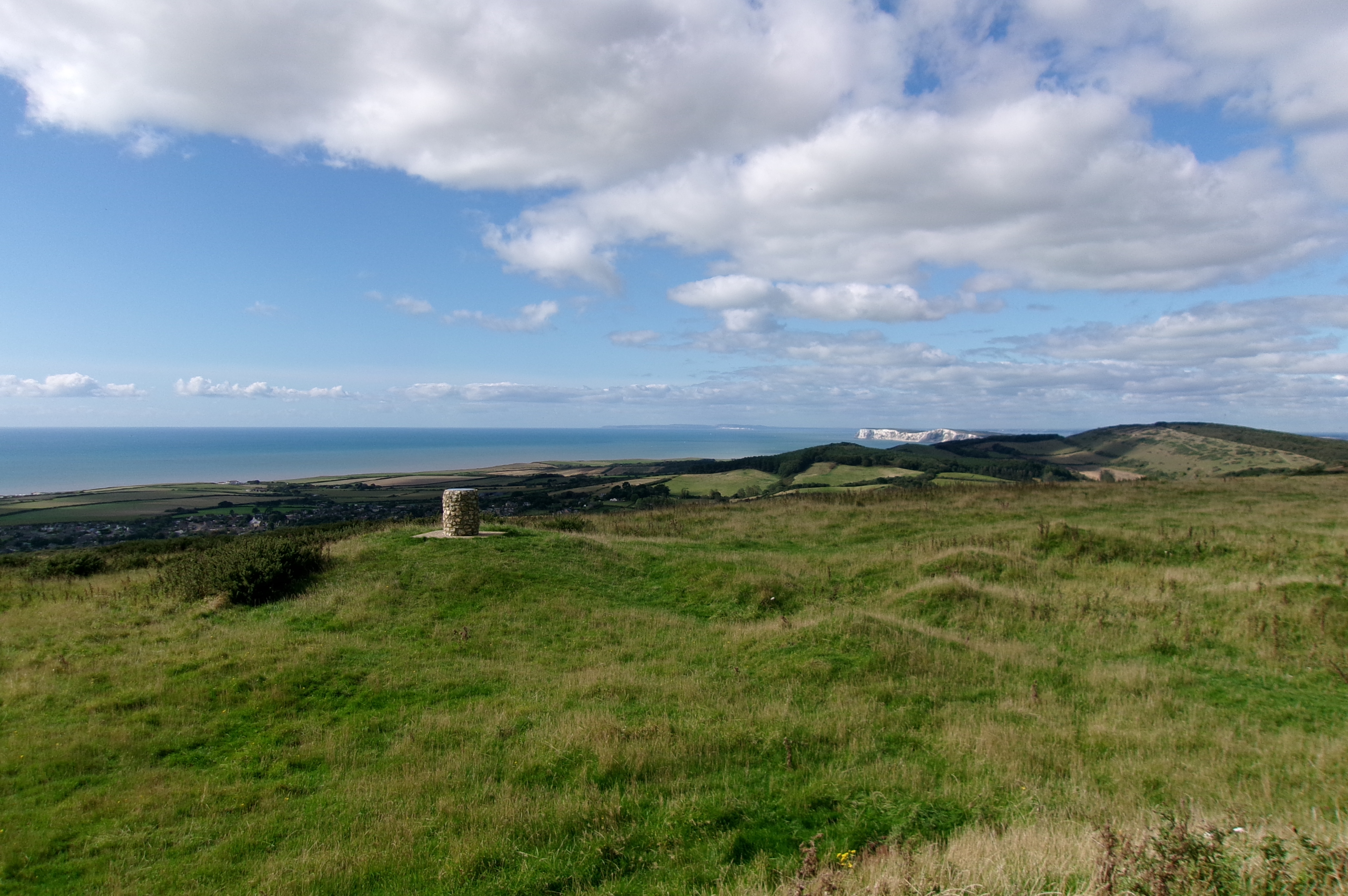
View west from Limerstone Down

Limerstone Down, rising to 199 m (653 ft) above the hamlet to the north, affords fine views across the Island.

== Name ==
The name means 'the farmstead or estate belonging to a man called Lēofmǣr or Lēodmǣr', from Old English Lēofmǣr or Lēodmǣr (personal name) and tūn.

1252: Lemerestune

1265: Lemerstone

1273: Lumerestune

1291: Lymerstone

1769: Lemerstone (Down)
