= Yaverland Manor =

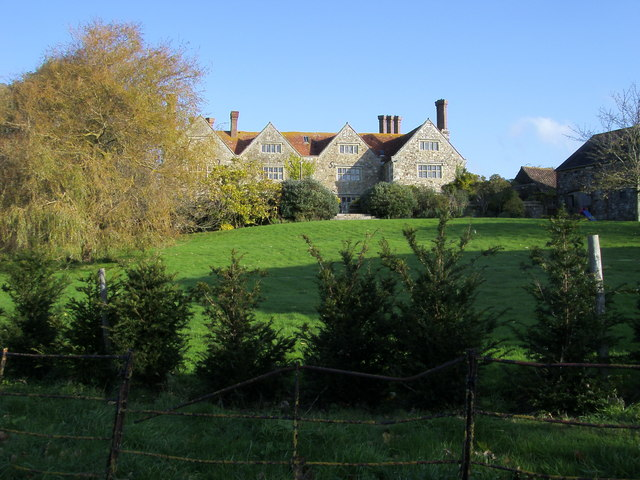

- Location within Isle of Wight
- 50°40′11.64″N 1°7′55.92″W
- OS grid reference: SZ6142285938

Listed Building – Grade I
- Designated: 1949

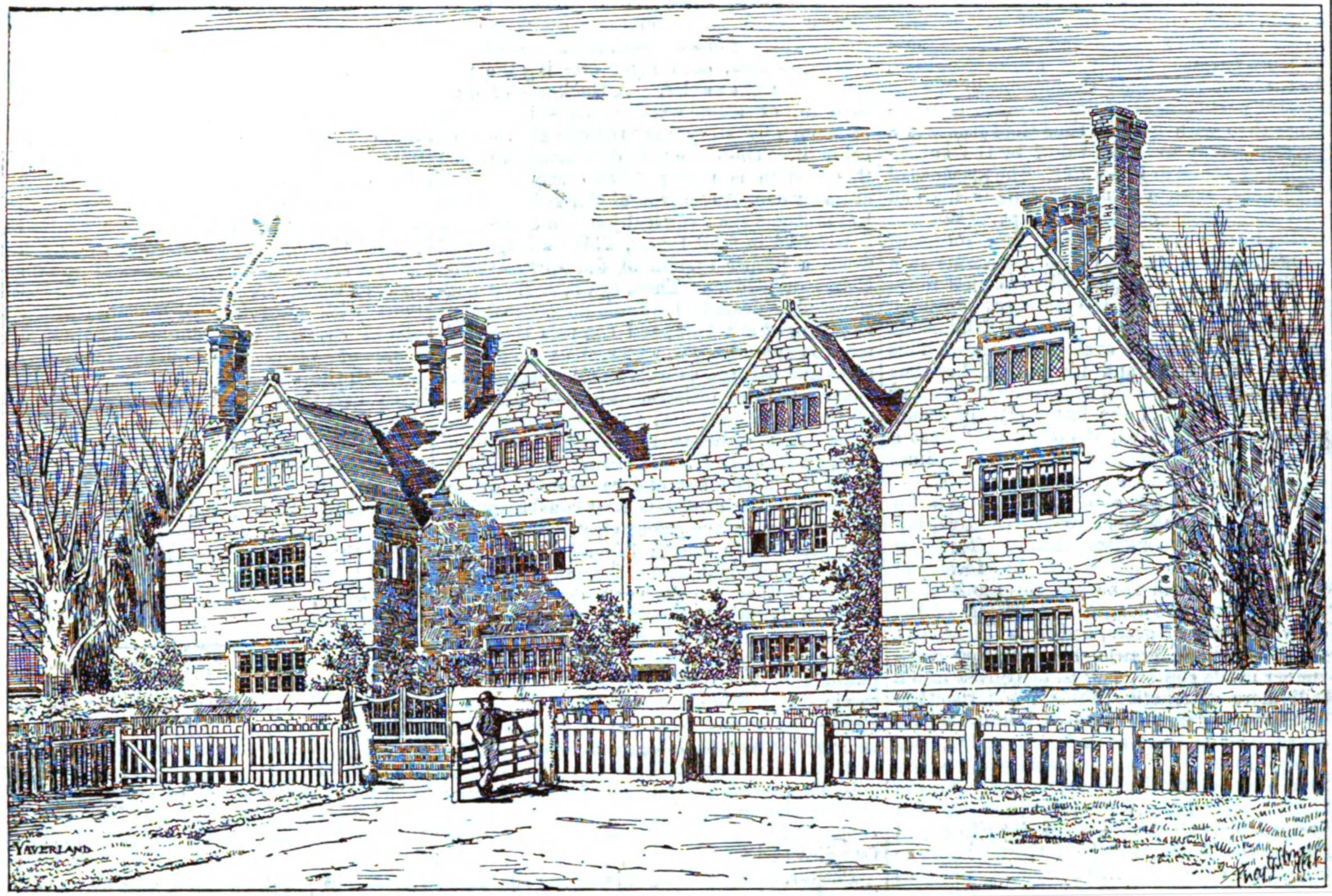
1891 line drawing of Yaverland Manor

Yaverland Manor is a medieval manor house in Yaverland, near Sandown, on the Isle of Wight. It was reconstructed in c. 1620 with alterations c. 1709. It became a Grade I listed building in 1949.

== History ==
The house was erected with many stellas in the reign of James I, after the manor had passed by purchase from the Russells, the progenitors of the noble family of the Dukes of Bedford, who were Lords of Yaverland from the days of Edward I to those of Mary. Sir Theobald Russell, one of the chief heroes of the island, commanded the inhabitants in 1340, when they successfully resisted a French invading force that landed at Bembridge, but unfortunately he was slain in the moment of victory. The house contains some wood carvings, including two figures known as Nero and Cleopatra, others in the shape of Moors' heads with wings, some playing on musical instruments, some as brackets to support the ceiling of the staircase.

It has a great hall where a carriage or two might drive about comfortably. Its grey walls and great mullioned windows harmonize soberly and well with its grove of fine sheltering elms. In the green close before the house two great stone shields, with coat armour boldly carved, are laid against the trunk of a tree, evidently taken from the old gateway. Close by is the chapel, referred by most historians to the time of Edward I, but evidently of much more ancient date.

== Residents ==
Sydney Goldman lived at Yaverland Manor from about 1929.
