= Newport Roman Villa =

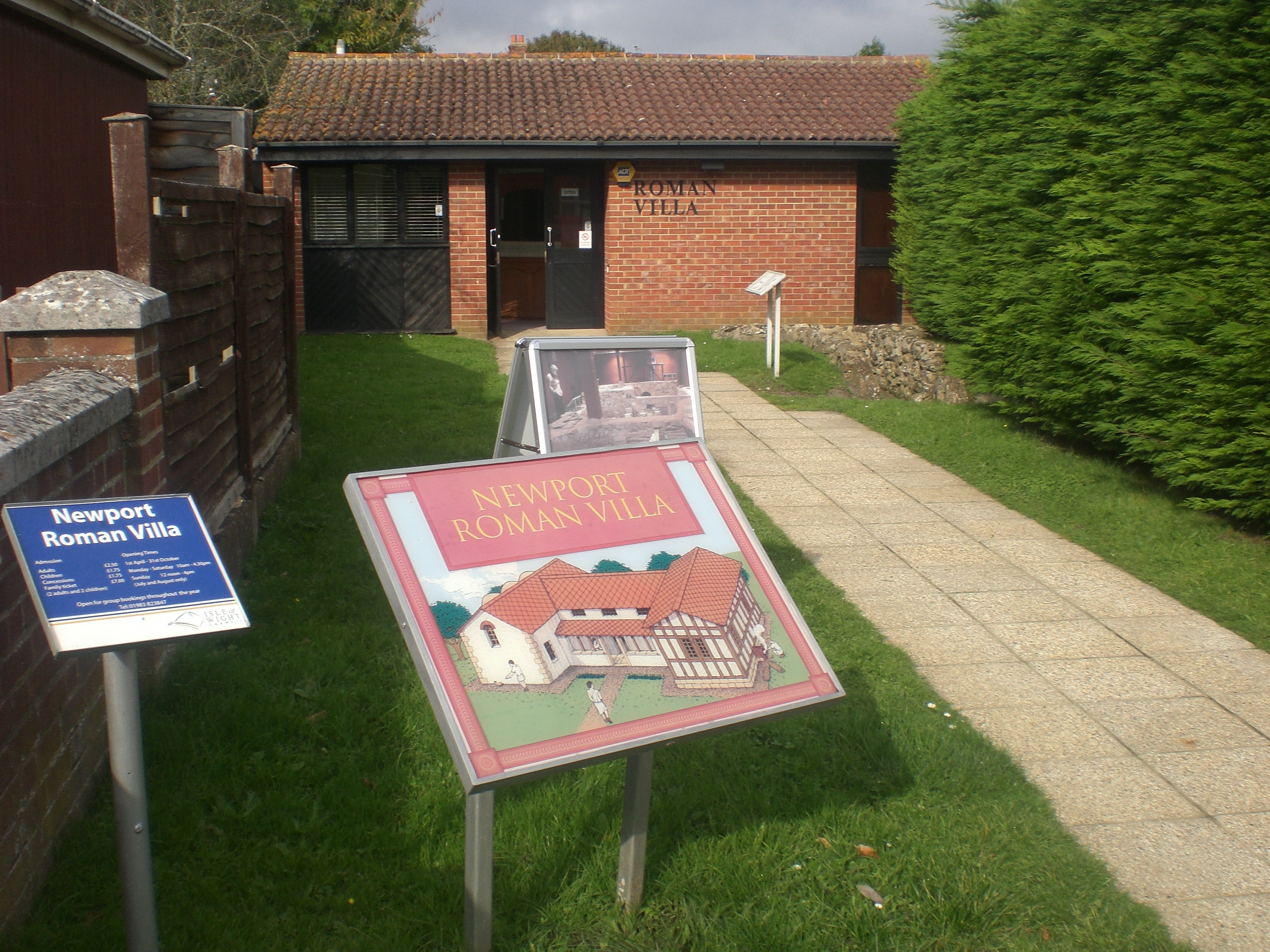
- Museum entrance

- Location on the Isle of Wight

General information
- Location: Isle of Wight, England, UK
- Coordinates: 50.6945°N 1.2918°W
- OS grid: SZ500885

Newport Roman Villa was a Romano-British farmhouse constructed in 280 AD. It is located near to Newport, Isle of Wight.

== Discovery and excavation ==
Newport Roman Villa was unearthed in 1926 when garage foundations were laid by a nearby homeowner. The site was excavated and the ground plan of the villa house was uncovered.

In 1926 the Mayor of Newport, Alderman John Curtis Millgate JP, proposed that the Newport Town Council accept the site of the Roman Villa and erect a building over the villa to preserve it. After reviewing the suggestion and considering the costs involved, the town council (under a new mayor), declined the offer due to the costs involved.

Alderman Millgate decided to purchase the site himself and constructed a structure over the villa. Following his death in 1956, the site passed into the ownership of his daughter, Grace Millgate. In 1960, when the building needed a fair amount of repair, Miss Millgate offered the site to Newport Town Council, however it was again declined.

The Isle of Wight County Council agreed to accept the gift of the site from Miss Millgate in December 1960 and the deeds were handed over in April 1961.

It is now a scheduled monument, giving it protected status.

== History ==
Newport Roman Villa was constructed in about 280 AD with local stone including flint, chalk, limestone and greensand with the walls remaining almost at their original height. The building was roofed with massive slabs of Bembridge limestone which needed large roof timbers to support them. Many of these roof slabs had a distinctive shape, pierced with a single hole to take a nail, were found on the site. It is likely the building was the centre of a wealthy estate.

The discovery of fragments of window glass on the site shows that the building had some glazed windows, and remains of painted wall plaster during excavation show that at least some of the rooms had brightly coloured interior walls.

It features a well-preserved Roman bath suite with hypocaust underfloor heating. The furnace for heating the bath suite was outside the back wall of the villa at the end of the bath wing, and a slave would have been responsible for providing it with fuel. The hot air from the furnace passed through an arch at the base of the villa's back wall and circulated under the raised floors of the three rooms.

It remains unknown when life at the villa ended. During excavation, the skull of a woman in her early thirties was found in the corner of one of the rooms. It has been suggested that she was killed during a raid in an abandoned building. However it is also viewed that the abandonment of the island's villas by the middle of the fourth century could be due to economic hardship rather than the threat of attacks by Anglo-saxon raiders.

== Museum ==
The villa has since been reconstructed based on archaeological evidence featuring a Roman kitchen and Roman garden. It is now open to the public usually from around April to October. The villa regularly has over 5,000 visitors per year, with a further 1,400 school children taking part in educational visits. It is located on Cypress Road in Newport on the Isle of Wight in the middle of a residential development.

For 2009 the villa underwent a roof replacement project, involving essential repairs and replacement of the cover-building roof structure to protect it from further weathering. The project has been joint-funded by the Isle of Wight Council and English Heritage, which grant-aided over £40,000 towards costs. The roof has been designed to improve environmental conditions, reducing moisture levels which have contributed to a build-up of algae on the mosaics below.
