= Mottistone Manor =

National trust-owned house and gardens in Mottistone, Isle of Wight, England

Coordinates: 50.65249°N 1.42678°W

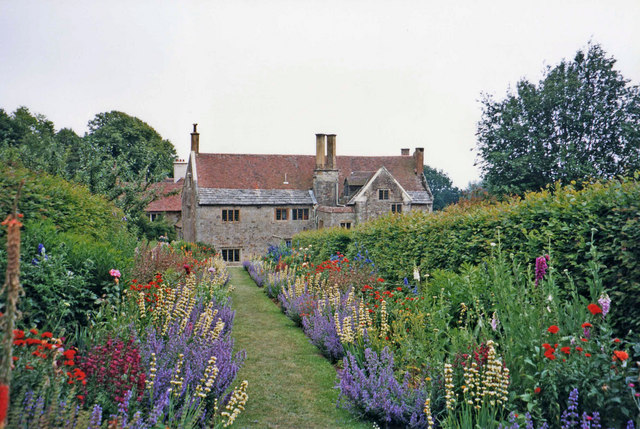
Mottistone Manor and Garden, Isle of Wight

Mottistone Manor is a National Trust property in the village of Mottistone on the Isle of Wight, England. It has gardens and is a listed building. It was first mentioned in documents related to the Domesday Book of 1086.

== History ==
The oldest parts of the manor, the south-east wing, date from the fifteenth or early sixteenth century. The north-west wing was added or remodelled by Thomas Cheke in 1567, and additions to the south-east wing were made in the early seventeenth century. The whole house was remodelled in the 1920s by the architects Seely & Paget, John Seely (later 2nd Baron Mottistone; 1899–1963) of the firm being a great-grandson of industrialist and politician Charles Seely, who had bought the house and estate in 1861.

In 1963, Mottistone Manor and Estate were gifted to the National Trust following the death of John Seely, 2nd Baron Mottistone. Since then, the Trust has restored and managed both the manor and its gardens. While much of the manor remains closed as a historic building, parts of the house have been opened to visitors, including a second-hand bookshop and the Long Room, which displays a collection of mid-20th-century decorative wall hangings commissioned by John Seely and Paul Paget. Visitor facilities also include areas within the manor entrance and foyer, allowing greater public access to the building's history and collections.

The gardens are open to the public. Although most of the manor is not generally accessible, parts of the building, including the second-hand bookshop and the Long Room exhibition space, are open to visitors. The great-great-granddaughter of General J. E. B. Seely, 1st Baron Mottistone, the theatre and opera director Sophie Hunter, held her wedding reception here with Benedict Cumberbatch on 14 February 2015.

== Gallery ==
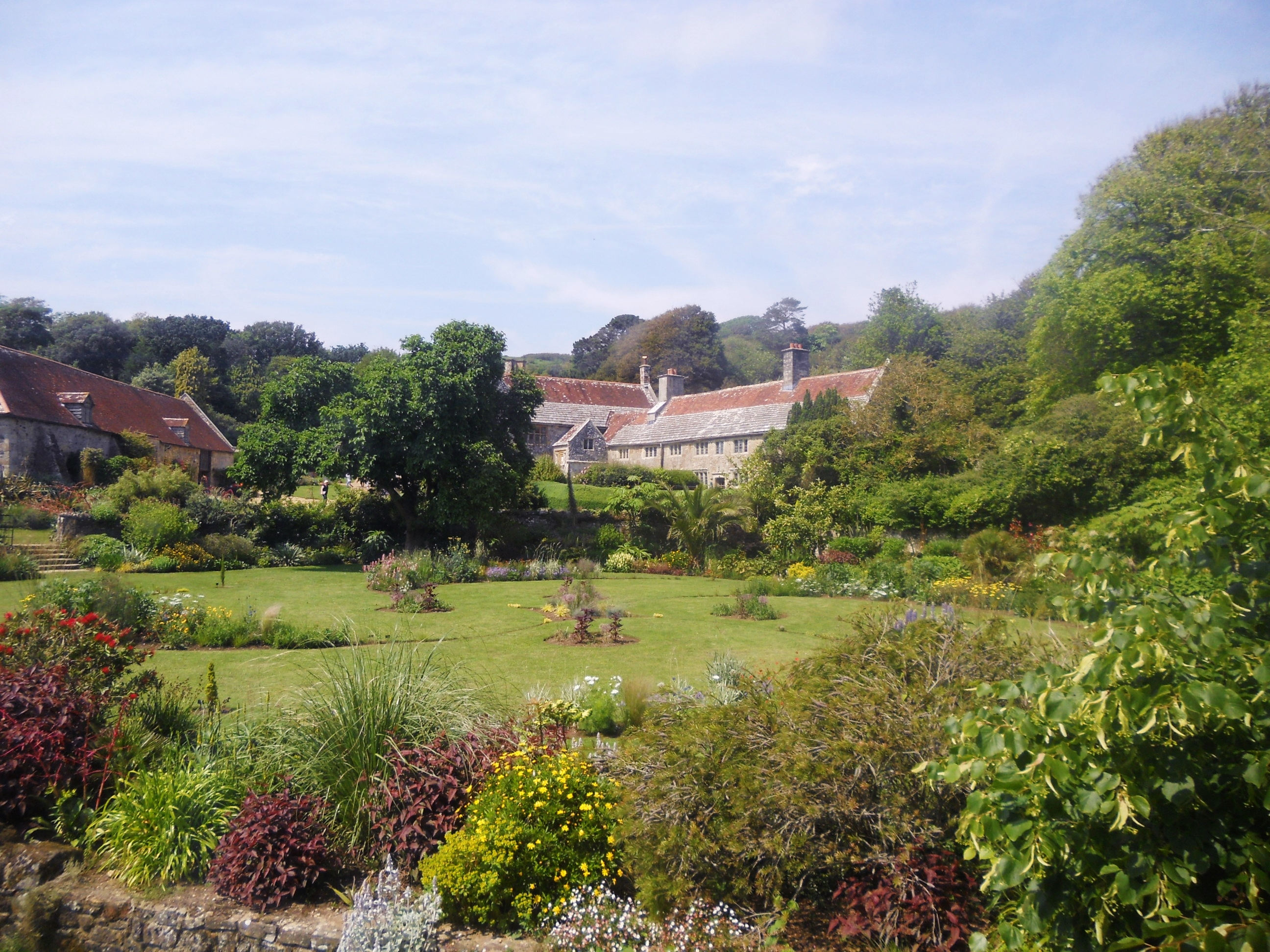
Mottistone Manor and Garden

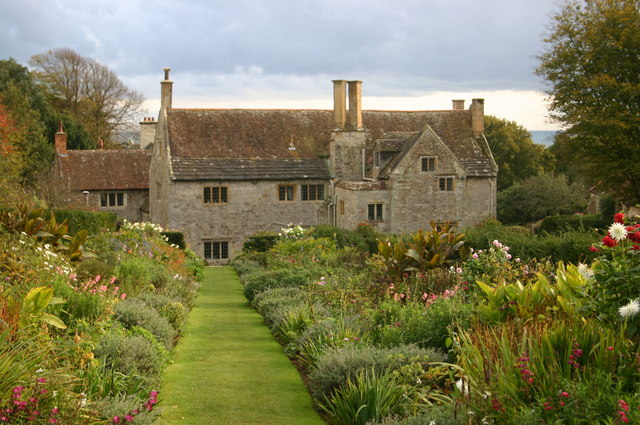
Mottistone Manor and Garden

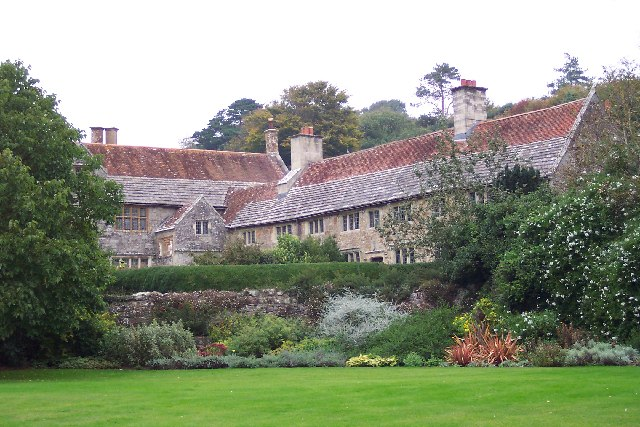
Mottistone Manor and Garden

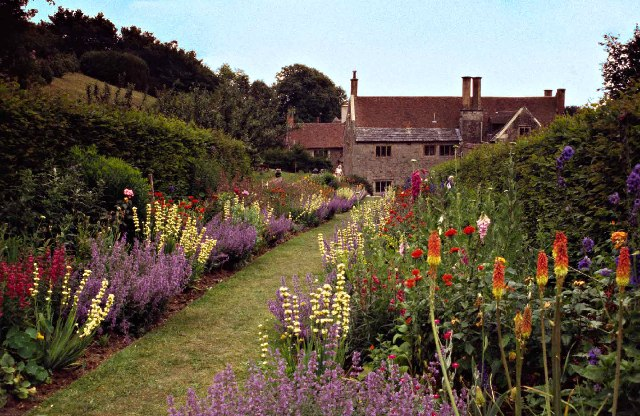
Mottistone Manor and Garden

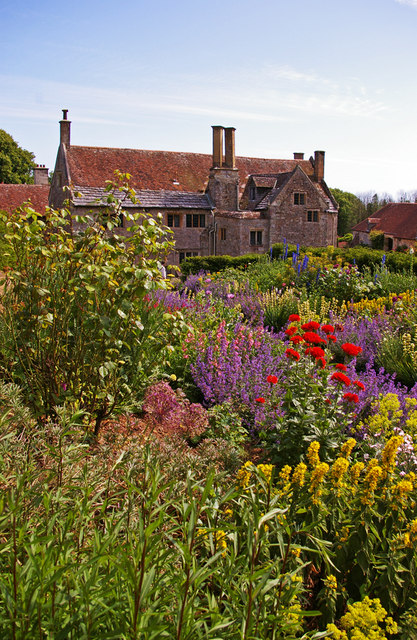
Mottistone Manor and Garden

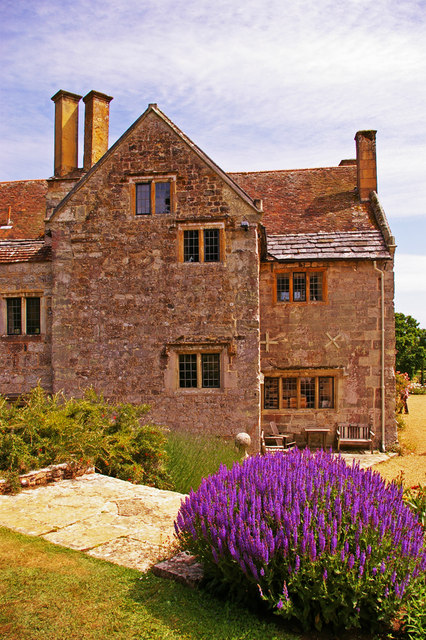
Mottistone Manor and Garden

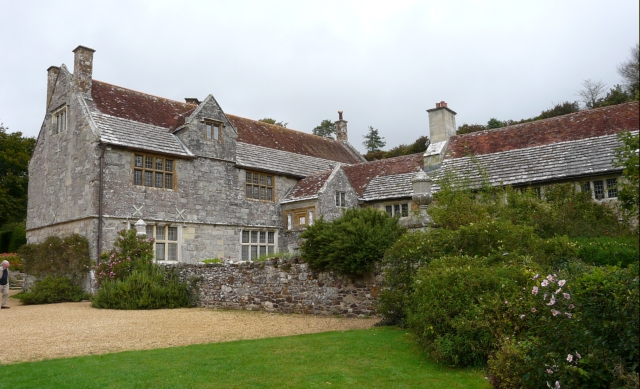
Mottistone Manor

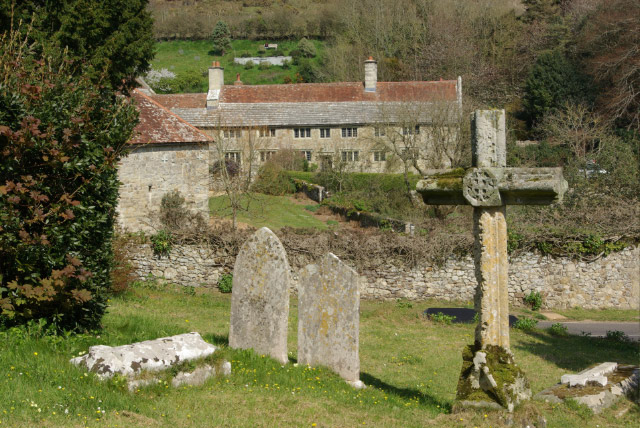
Mottistone Manor and the adjacent St. Peter and St. Paul's Church

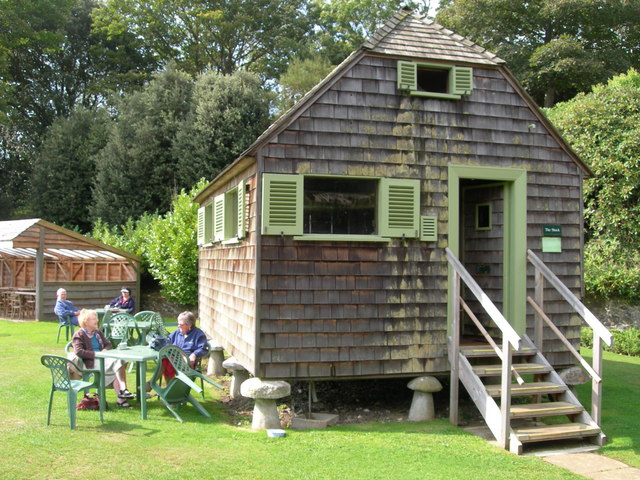
The Shack at Mottistone Garden
