= Mottistone =

Village on the Isle of Wight, England

Coordinates: 50.65180°N 1.42765°W

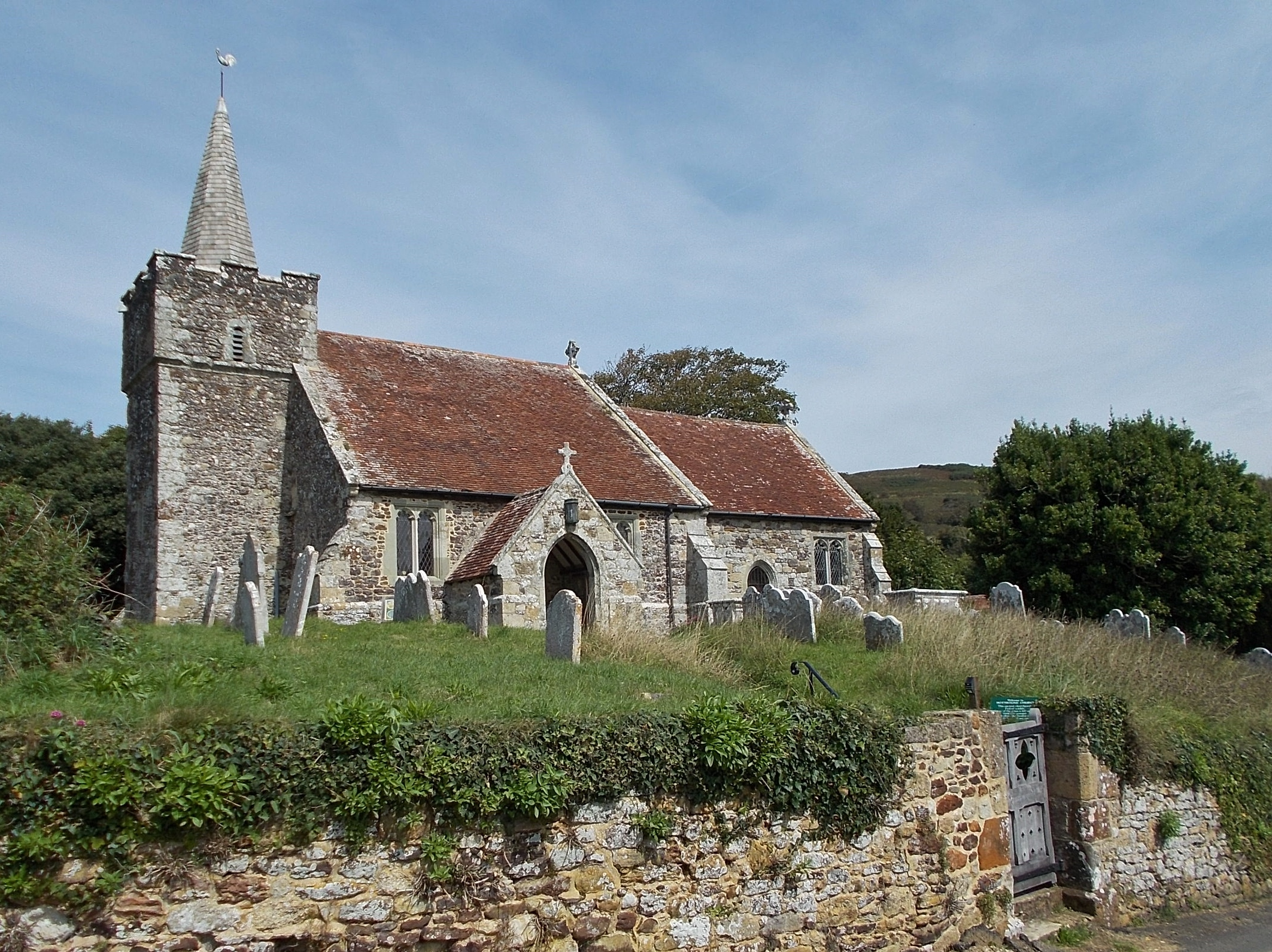
- Mottistone Church

- Location within the Isle of Wight
- Civil parish: Brighstone
- Unitary authority: Isle of Wight
- Shire county: Isle of Wight
- Region: South East
- Country: England
- Sovereign state: United Kingdom
- Post town: VENTNOR
- Postcode district: PO38
- Dialling code: 01983
- UK Parliament: Isle of Wight West

Mottistone is a village and former civil parish, now in the parish of Brighstone, on the Isle of Wight, England. It is in the Back of the Wight. It is located 8 miles southwest of Newport in the southwest of the island, and is home to the National Trust's Mottistone Manor. In 1931 the parish had a population of 114. On 1 April 1933 the parish was abolished and merged with Brighstone.

== Name ==
The name means 'the stone of a speaker or a speakers at a meeting', from Old English mōtere and stān, referring to The Longstone, formerly Menhir, an Anglo-Saxon meeting place. Its name was given by the Jutes.

- 1086 (Domesday Book): Modrestan
- 1176: Motestan
- 1291: Moterestone
- 1374: Mottistone
- 1623: Motson

== History ==
The Island's only megalithic monument, the Longstone is nearby.

During the Norman Conquest, William son of Azor held the village, then the de Insula family. It then passed through marriage to William de Clamorgan, possibly associated with Clamerkin Lake, and then to Edmund de Langford, and for some time after that the Cheke or Chyke family owned it. In 1623, George Oglander wrote:

Thomas Cheeke, a lewde son of a discrete father, sowlde Moston to Mr Dillington

in 1638, two men kept watch on Mottistone Down. In 1796 its population was 30.

Claud Raymond, a recipient of the Victoria Cross, was from Mottistone.

== Geography ==
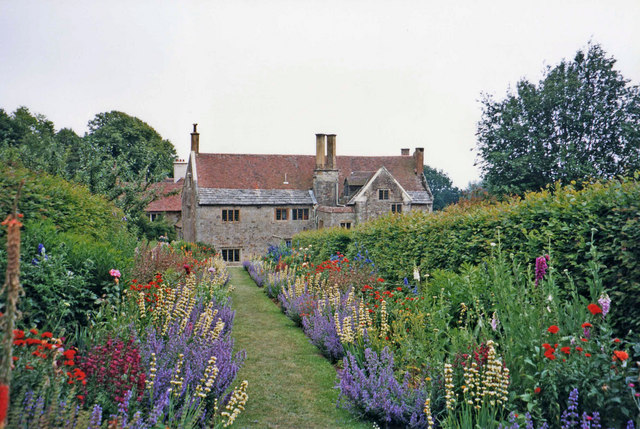
Mottistone Manor and Garden, Isle of Wight

Mottistone Down is a Site of Special Scientific Interest north of Mottistone, and covering 31.4 hectares (78 acres); it adjoins the Brighstone Down, the central part of the ridge. Most of the area is owned by the National Trust, including the manor, down and cottages, and is biologically important due to its chalk and neutral grasslands.

== Today ==
Public transport is provided by Southern Vectis buses on route 12.

The church of St Peter and St Paul's, founded ~12th century, hosts part of an annual Christmas Tree festival (the Brighstone Christmas Tree Festival).
