= Brighstone =

Village on the Isle of Wight, England

Coordinates: 50.644°N 1.400°W

- Village
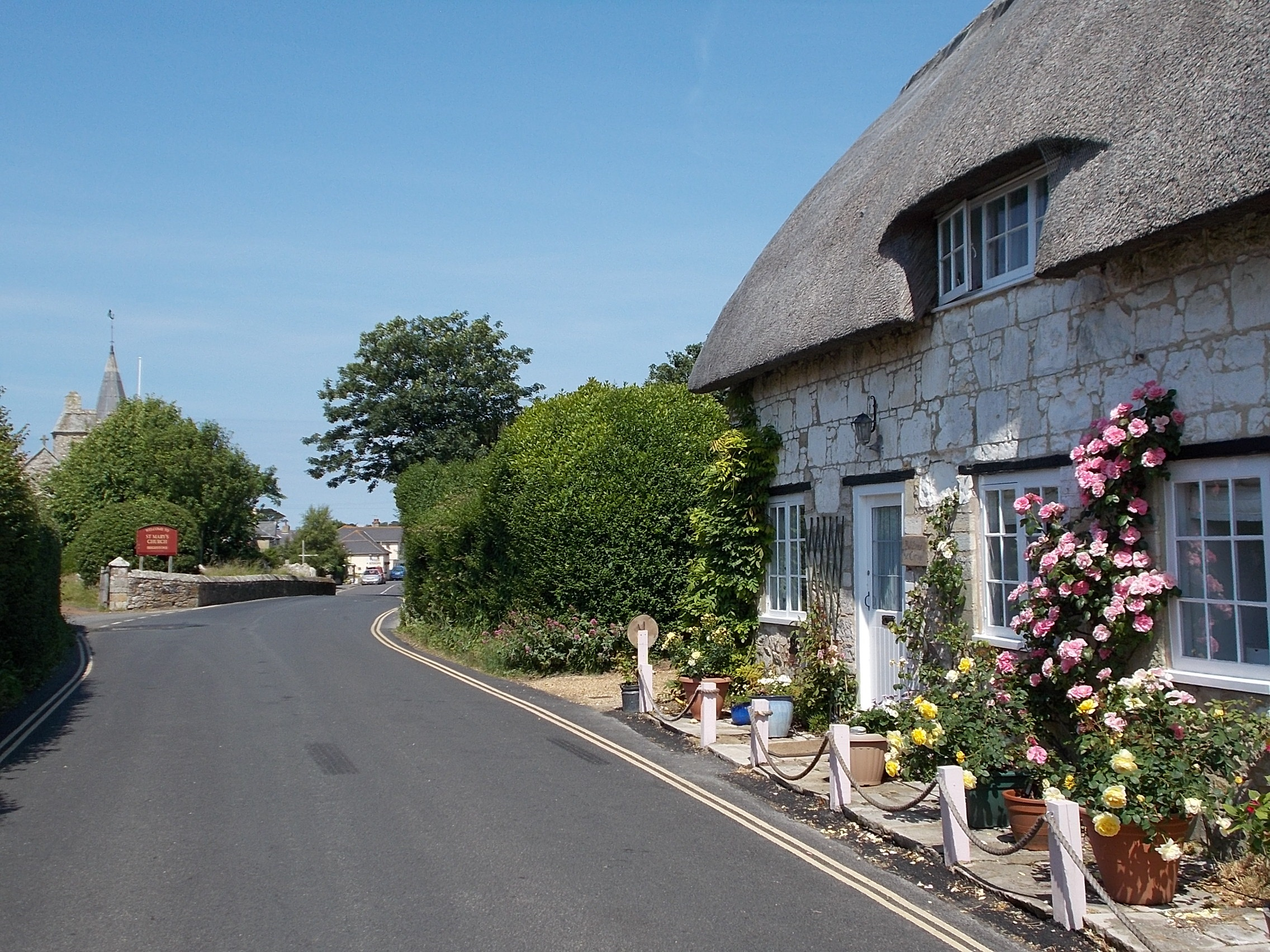
- Brighstone Village

- Location within the Isle of Wight
- Area: 19.7665 km^{2} (7.6319 sq mi)
- Population: 1,603 (2011 census including Brook, Hulverstone, Limerstone and Thorncross)
  - Density: 81/km^{2} (210/sq mi)
- Civil parish: Brighstone
- Unitary authority: Isle of Wight
- Ceremonial county: Isle of Wight
- Region: South East
- Country: England
- Sovereign state: United Kingdom
- Post town: Newport
- Postcode district: PO30
- Dialling code: 01983
- Police: Hampshire and Isle of Wight
- Fire: Hampshire and Isle of Wight
- Ambulance: Isle of Wight
- UK Parliament: Isle of Wight West

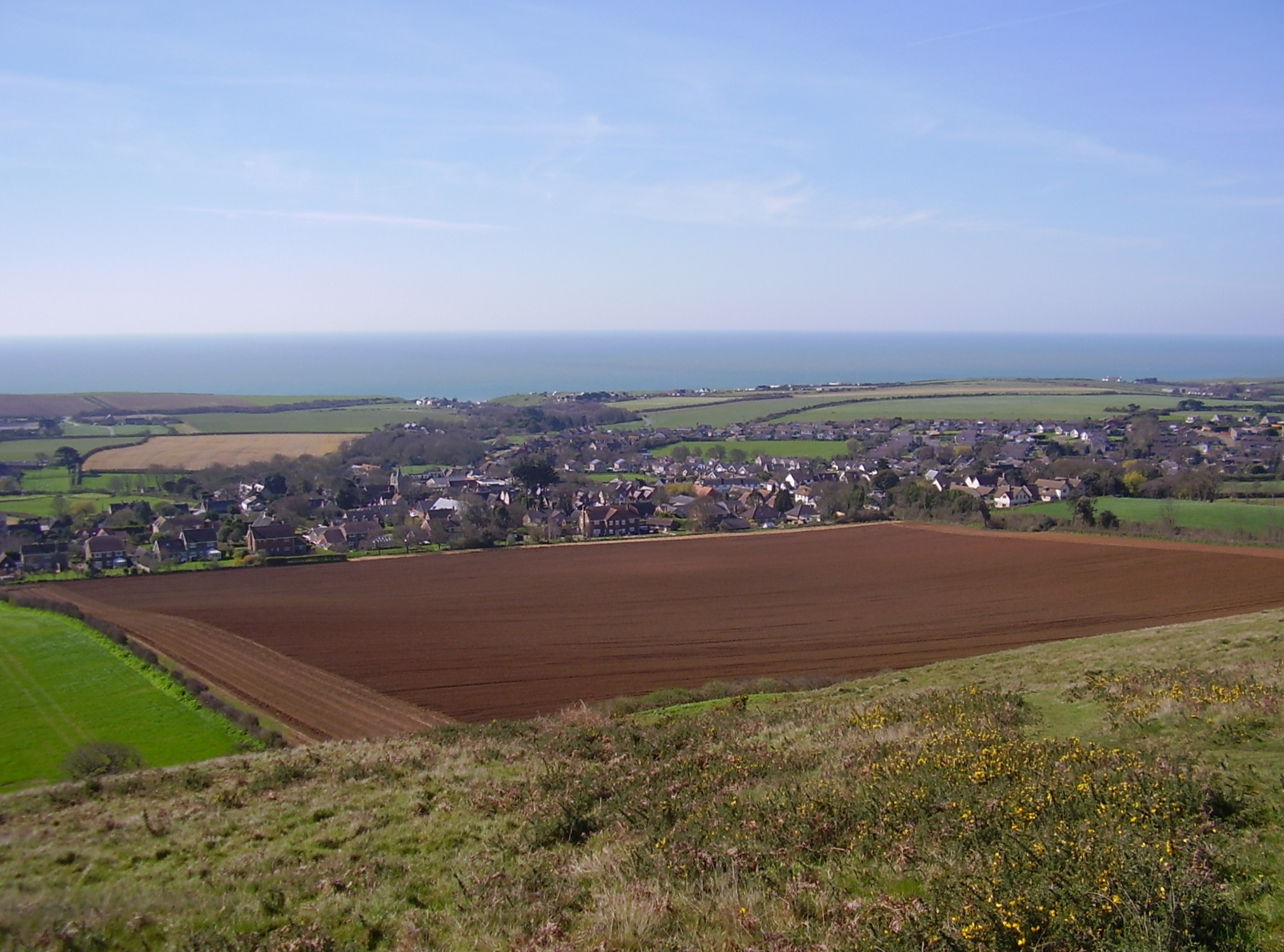
View of Brighstone from Limerstone Down, looking south-west, with the English Channel in the distance

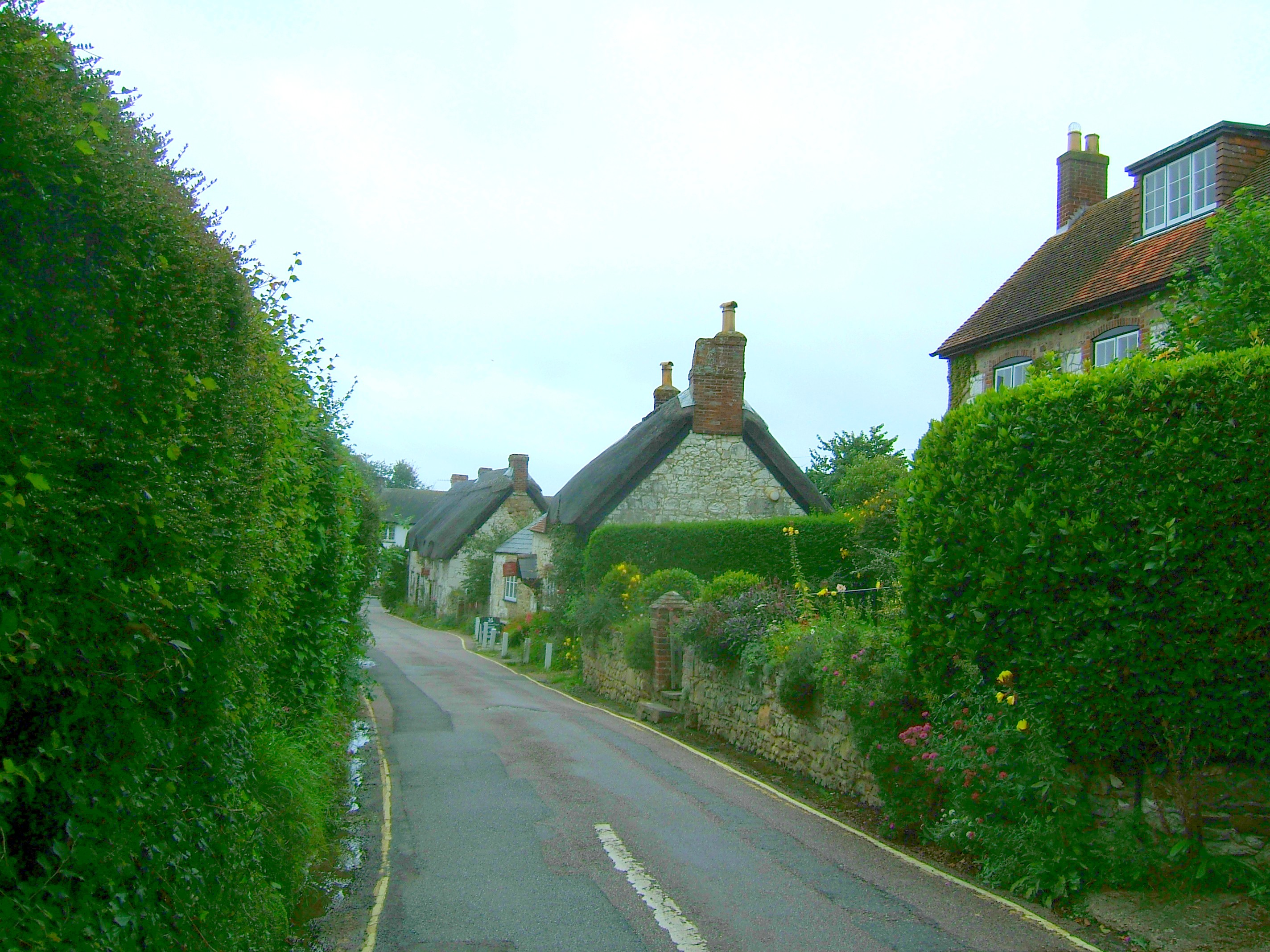
Brighstone village

Brighstone is a village and civil parish on the Isle of Wight, 6 miles southwest of Newport on the B3399 road. Brighstone was previously known as "Brixton". The name means 'the farmstead or estate belonging to a man called Beorhtwīg', from Old English Beorhtwīg (personal name) and tūn. In 2011 the parish had a population of 1603.

Brighstone is one of the largest villages in the area locally known as the Back of the Wight and extends toward Limerstone and Mottistone. In Roman times a villa was built to the north, to take advantage of the clean waters of the Buddle Brook.

== History ==
Brighstone history dates back to the 9th century when it was given to the Bishopric of Winchester by King Egbert.

Brighstone parish was formed in 1644. The civil parish comprises the main village of Brighstone together with the smaller villages of Brook, Hulverstone, Limerstone and Mottistone. The entire parish lies within an area of the Isle of Wight AONB and its coastline is designated as Heritage Coast and Site of Special Scientific Interest.

St. Mary's Church, Brighstone is a venerable old church that has stood for more than eight centuries. The village also features Brighstone Shop and Museum, owned by the National Trust, displaying exhibitions on village life in the 19th century and contains a wealth of information about the Brighstone lifeboats.

In 2021 a newly-identified species of dinosaur was named Brighstoneus simmondsi to reflect that its fossilised remains had been discovered at a nearby excavation site; it was discovered alongside another dinosaur, Neovenator salerii in 1978.

== Today ==
Brighstone is popular with tourists for its thatched cottages and local shops. Several large events are hosted in the village each year, including the Brighstone Show, Art exhibitions and the Brighstone Christmas Tree Festival. The local scout hut functions as a Youth Hostel during the summer.

== Notable residents ==
The village pub is called The Three Bishops, named after three rectors of Brighstone parish who went on to become famous bishops. The first was the 17th-century Bishop Ken who wrote the famous hymns "Awake my soul and with the sun" and "Glory to Thee my God this night". Bishop Samuel Wilberforce became rector in 1830, and used to entertain his father, anti-slavery campaigner William Wilberforce. Wilberforce Road is named after him, and Brighstone's village hall is called the Wilberforce Hall. The third bishop, Doctor George Moberly, was headmaster of Winchester College before becoming rector of Brighstone in 1866 and bishop of Salisbury a few years later.

Another notable person who lived in the village in the 19th century was the clergyman and amateur palaeontologist William Fox, who discovered several species of dinosaur in Brighstone Bay.

== Bus routes ==
The village is linked to other parts of the island by Southern Vectis bus route 12, serving Freshwater, Totland and Newport as well as intermediate villages.

== See also ==
- Brighstone Bay
- Brighstone Forest
- Brighstone Down
- Brighstone Christmas Tree Festival
- St. Mary's Church, Brighstone
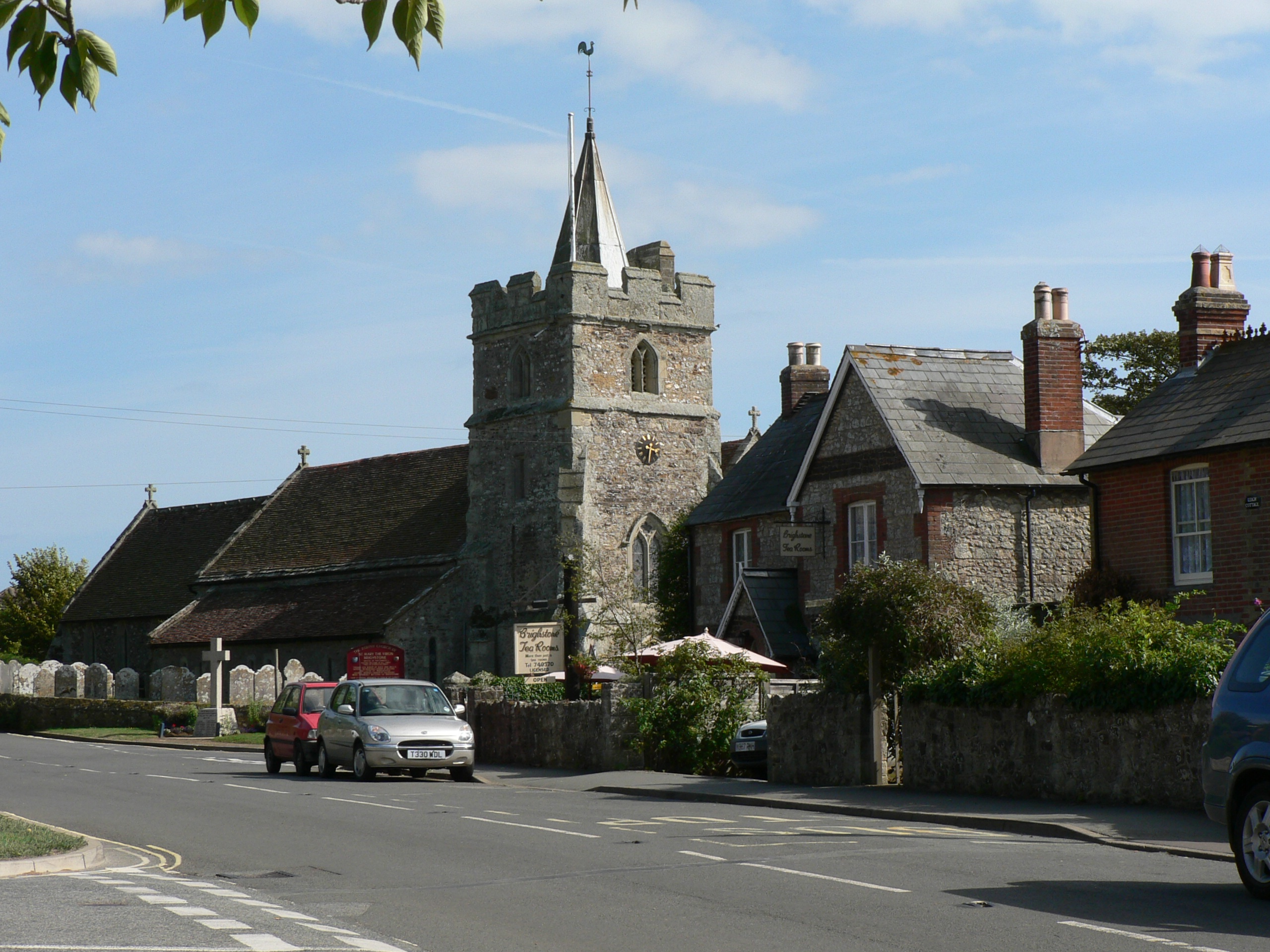
St. Mary's Church in Brighstone is a venerable old church that has stood for more than eight centuries.
