= St Peter and St Paul's Church, Mottistone =

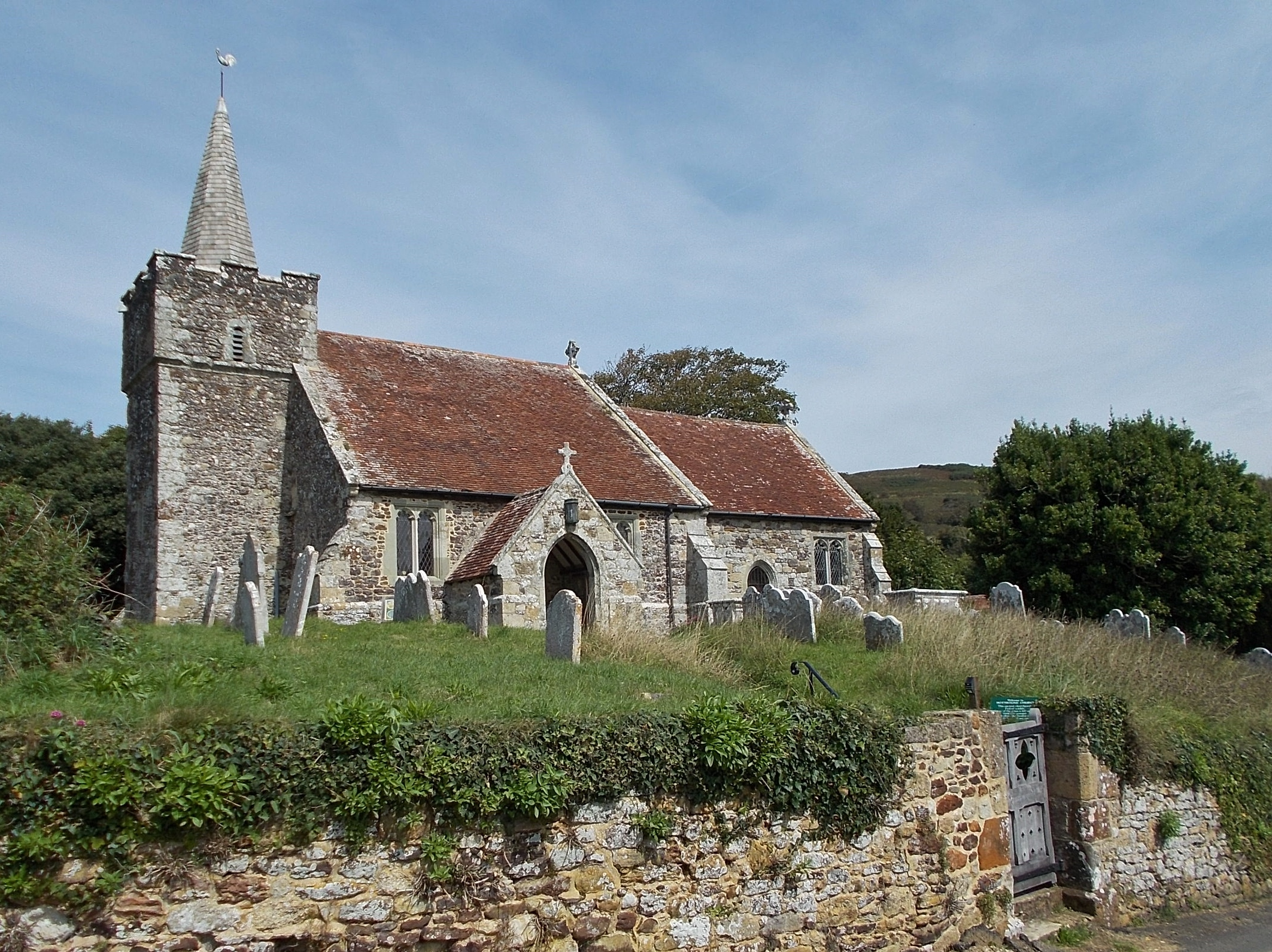
- St Peter and St Paul's Church, Mottistone
- 50°39′06″N 01°25′38″W
- Denomination: Church of England
- Churchmanship: Broad Church

History
- Dedication: St Peter and St Paul

Administration
- Province: Canterbury
- Diocese: Portsmouth
- Parish: Mottistone

St Peter and St Paul's Church is a parish church in the Church of England in the village of Mottistone, Isle of Wight. It is a Grade I listed building.

== History ==
The church is medieval, dating from the 12th century, by Brian de Insula, lord of Mottistone Manor. Much of the current building is from the 15th. The Cheke chapel was added in the 16th century, by the Cheke family who became lords of the manor in 1300. The chancel was reroofed in 1862, with timber from the Bermudan barque Cedrene which was wrecked nearby. The Cedrene was 16 days old when it wrecked on the shores of the Back of the Wight.

Where the fragrance of Bermuda Cedar still lingers after 100 years... a token of the beauty that was Cedrene.

A Victorian restoration was carried out in 1863, which included the reconstruction of window tracery, nave arches and piers, roofs and walls.

In 2014 a publicly funded project to improve access to the church for disabled users was carried out.

Theatre and opera director Sophie Hunter, great-great-granddaughter of General J. E. B. Seely, 1st Baron Mottistone, was married to actor Benedict Cumberbatch in the church on 14 February 2015.

The parish is part of the West Wight benefice within the Anglican Diocese of Portsmouth.

== Architecture ==
The stone building has a tile roof and shingle spire. It consists of a nave with aisles, chancel, north chapel and south porch. The west tower has a crenellated parapet and spire.

The interior includes a font which may date back to the 12th century, however it was refashioned in the late 19th or early 20th century. In 1948 John Seely, 2nd Baron Mottistone commissioned the parclose screen in the Cheke chapel in memory of his father General J. E. B. Seely, 1st Baron Mottistone.
