= List of United Kingdom locations: Broo-Brt =

The United Kingdom

This is part of the list of United Kingdom locations: a gazetteer of place names in the United Kingdom showing each place's locality and geographical coordinates.

== Bro (continued) ==
=== Broo ===
Location	Locality	Coordinates (links to map & photo sources)	OS grid reference
Brook (New Forest)	Hampshire	50.92°N 01.61°W	SU2714
Brook (Test Valley)	Hampshire	51.05°N 01.51°W	SU3428
Brook	Kent	51.15°N 00.94°E	TR0644
Brook (Albury)	Surrey	51.20°N 00.48°W	TQ0646
Brook (Witley)	Surrey	51.12°N 00.67°W	SU9337
Brook	Isle of Wight	50.64°N 01.44°W	SZ3983
Brook (Dunsford)	Devon	50.70°N 03.70°W	SX8091
Brook (Tavistock)	Devon	50.52°N 04.16°W	SX4772
Brook	Carmarthenshire	51.75°N 04.52°W	SN2609
Brook Bottom	Lancashire	53.87°N 02.70°W	SD5442
Brook Bottom	Tameside	53.51°N 02.06°W	SD9602
Brook Bottom	Cheshire	53.37°N 02.03°W	SJ9886
Brooke	Norfolk	52.54°N 01.36°E	TM2899
Brooke	Rutland	52.63°N 00.76°W	SK8405
Brookenby	Lincolnshire	53.43°N 00.19°W	TF2095
Brook End (Borough of Bedford)	Bedfordshire	52.25°N 00.43°W	TL0763
Brook End (Central Bedfordshire)	Bedfordshire	52.10°N 00.30°W	TL1647
Brook End	Cambridgeshire	52.34°N 00.41°W	TL0873
Brookend (Hinton)	Gloucestershire	51.71°N 02.46°W	SO6802
Brookend (Woolaston)	Gloucestershire	51.68°N 02.59°W	ST5999
Brook End	Hertfordshire	51.93°N 00.08°W	TL3228
Brook End	Milton Keynes	52.08°N 00.67°W	SP9144
Brookend	Oxfordshire	51.88°N 01.53°W	SP3221
Brook End	Wiltshire	51.55°N 02.24°W	ST8384
Brook End	Worcestershire	52.13°N 02.20°W	SO8649
Brookfield	Middlesbrough	54.52°N 01.25°W	NZ4815
Brookfield	Lancashire	53.77°N 02.66°W	SD5631
Brookfield	Derbyshire	53.45°N 01.98°W	SK0195
Brookfield	Renfrewshire	55.84°N 04.54°W	NS4164
Brookfoot	Calderdale	53.70°N 01.80°W	SE1323
Brookgreen	Isle of Wight	50.64°N 01.46°W	SZ3883
Brook Green	Suffolk	52.18°N 00.71°E	TL8658
Brook Green	Hammersmith and Fulham	51.49°N 00.22°W	TQ2379
Brookhampton	Somerset	51.04°N 02.52°W	ST6327
Brookhampton	Shropshire	52.50°N 02.64°W	SO5690
Brookhampton	Oxfordshire	51.67°N 01.13°W	SU6098
Brook Hill	Hampshire	50.92°N 01.61°W	SU2714
Brook Hill	Nottinghamshire	52.89°N 01.16°W	SK5633
Brookhouse (Blackburn)	Lancashire	53.74°N 02.48°W	SD6828
Brookhouse (Caton-with-Littledale)	Lancashire	54.07°N 02.70°W	SD5464
Brookhouse	Calderdale	53.75°N 01.91°W	SE0629
Brookhouse	Rotherham	53.38°N 01.23°W	SK5188
Brookhouse	Denbighshire	53.17°N 03.39°W	SJ0765
Brookhouse	Cheshire	53.27°N 02.09°W	SJ9475
Brookhouse Green	Cheshire	53.14°N 02.28°W	SJ8161
Brookhouses	Derbyshire	53.39°N 01.97°W	SK0289
Brookhouses	Staffordshire	52.98°N 02.01°W	SJ9943
Brookhurst	Wirral	53.31°N 02.99°W	SJ3480
Brookland	Kent	50.99°N 00.82°E	TQ9825
Brooklands	Surrey	51.34°N 00.47°W	TQ0662
Brooklands	Leeds	53.81°N 01.48°W	SE3435
Brooklands	Trafford	53.40°N 02.31°W	SJ7990
Brooklands	Shropshire	52.97°N 02.71°W	SJ5242
Brookleigh	Devon	50.77°N 03.49°W	SX9598
Brookmans Park	Hertfordshire	51.72°N 00.20°W	TL2404
Brookpits	West Sussex	50.80°N 00.58°W	TQ0001
Brook Place	Surrey	51.34°N 00.63°W	SU9561
Brookrow	Shropshire	52.36°N 02.58°W	SO6074
Brooks	Cornwall	50.41°N 04.60°W	SX1560
Brooks	Powys	52.58°N 03.27°W	SO1499
Brooksbottoms	Bury	53.63°N 02.31°W	SD7915
Brooksby	Leicestershire	52.73°N 01.00°W	SK6716
Brooks End	Kent	51.35°N 01.28°E	TR2967
Brooks Green	West Sussex	51.01°N 00.40°W	TQ1225
Brookside	Berkshire	51.42°N 00.69°W	SU9170
Brookside	Derbyshire	53.22°N 01.47°W	SK3570
Brookside	Shropshire	52.64°N 02.45°W	SJ6905
Brook Street	West Sussex	51.01°N 00.14°W	TQ3026
Brook Street (Tonbridge)	Kent	51.18°N 00.24°E	TQ5745
Brook Street (Woodchurch)	Kent	51.06°N 00.75°E	TQ9333
Brook Street	Suffolk	52.10°N 00.65°E	TL8248
Brook Street	Essex	51.61°N 00.26°E	TQ5793
Brookthorpe	Gloucestershire	51.80°N 02.24°W	SO8312
Brookvale	Cheshire	53.31°N 02.69°W	SJ5480
Brookville	Norfolk	52.53°N 00.54°E	TL7396
Brook Waters	Wiltshire	51.00°N 02.12°W	ST9123
Brookwood	Surrey	51.30°N 00.63°W	SU9557
Broom	Devon	50.81°N 02.96°W	ST3202
Broom	Bedfordshire	52.07°N 00.29°W	TL1743
Broom	Warwickshire	52.17°N 01.86°W	SP0953
Broom	Pembrokeshire	51.73°N 04.73°W	SN1108
Broom	Cumbria	54.60°N 02.52°W	NY6623
Broom	Rotherham	53.41°N 01.33°W	SK4491
Broom	East Renfrewshire	55.77°N 04.32°W	NS5456
Broom	Fife	56.19°N 03.01°W	NO3701
Broombank	Worcestershire	52.32°N 02.48°W	SO6770
Broome	Norfolk	52.46°N 01.44°E	TM3491
Broome (Cardington)	Shropshire	52.57°N 02.70°W	SO5298
Broome (Hopesay)	Shropshire	52.41°N 02.88°W	SO4080
Broome	Worcestershire	52.40°N 02.14°W	SO9078
Broomedge	Cheshire	53.36°N 02.45°W	SJ7085
Broomer's Corner	West Sussex	50.97°N 00.40°W	TQ1221
Broomershill	West Sussex	50.96°N 00.49°W	TQ0619
Broomfield	Somerset	51.08°N 03.11°W	ST2232
Broomfield	Essex	51.76°N 00.46°E	TL7010
Broomfield (Herne Bay)	Kent	51.35°N 01.14°E	TR1966
Broomfield (Maidstone)	Kent	51.23°N 00.62°E	TQ8352
Broomfield	Wiltshire	51.50°N 02.18°W	ST8778
Broomfield	Cumbria	54.82°N 03.02°W	NY3448
Broomfield	Aberdeenshire	57.37°N 02.08°W	NJ9532
Broomfields	Shropshire	52.74°N 02.86°W	SJ4217
Broomfleet	East Riding of Yorkshire	53.73°N 00.66°W	SE8827
Broom Green	Norfolk	52.77°N 00.93°E	TF9824
Broomgrove	East Sussex	50.86°N 00.58°E	TQ8210
Broomhall	Surrey	51.38°N 00.63°W	SU9566
Broomhall	Cheshire	53.01°N 02.56°W	SJ6247
Broomhall Green	Cheshire	53.01°N 02.56°W	SJ6247
Broomham	East Sussex	50.88°N 00.15°E	TQ5212
Broomhaugh	Northumberland	54.94°N 01.98°W	NZ0161
Broomhill	Barnsley	53.51°N 01.38°W	SE4102
Broom Hill	City of Bristol	51.43°N 02.54°W	ST6271
Broomhill	City of Bristol	51.48°N 02.54°W	ST6276
Broom Hill	Bromley	51.37°N 00.08°E	TQ4566
Broomhill	Cheshire	53.21°N 02.79°W	SJ4769
Broom Hill	Dorset	50.81°N 01.95°W	SU0302
Broom Hill	Durham	54.88°N 01.84°W	NZ1054
Broomhill	Highland	57.71°N 04.16°W	NH7171
Broomhill	Kent	51.27°N 01.21°E	TR2458
Broomhill	Norfolk	52.61°N 00.37°E	TF6104
Broomhill	Northumberland	55.30°N 01.62°W	NU2401
Broomhill	Nottinghamshire	53.02°N 01.19°W	SK5448
Broomhill	Scottish Borders	55.55°N 02.82°W	NT4829
Broom Hill	Suffolk	52.07°N 01.29°E	TM2647
Broom Hill	Worcestershire	52.37°N 02.13°W	SO9175
Broomhill Bank	Kent	51.13°N 00.22°E	TQ5640
Broomholm	Norfolk	52.84°N 01.47°E	TG3433
Broomhouse	City of Glasgow	55.83°N 04.14°W	NS6662
Broomlands	North Ayrshire	55.60°N 04.63°W	NS3438
Broomley	Northumberland	54.93°N 01.95°W	NZ0360
Broompark	Durham	54.76°N 01.62°W	NZ2441
Broomridge	Stirling	56.09°N 03.93°W	NS8091
Broom's Barn	Suffolk	52.25°N 00.56°E	TL7565
Broom's Green	Herefordshire	51.99°N 02.42°W	SO7133
Broomsthorpe	Norfolk	52.81°N 00.72°E	TF8428
Broom Street	Kent	51.32°N 00.92°E	TR0462
Broomy Hill	Herefordshire	52.04°N 02.74°W	SO4939
Broomyshaw	Staffordshire	53.03°N 01.91°W	SK0649

=== Bror-Brou ===
Location	Locality	Coordinates (links to map & photo sources)	OS grid reference
Brora	Highland	58.01°N 03.86°W	NC9004
Brosdale Island	Argyll and Bute	55.78°N 05.99°W	NR495621
Broseley	Shropshire	52.60°N 02.48°W	SJ6701
Brotherhouse Bar	Lincolnshire	52.70°N 00.13°W	TF2614
Brotheridge Green	Worcestershire	52.06°N 02.26°W	SO8241
Brother Isle	Shetland Islands	60.51°N 01.22°W	HU424812
Brotherlee	Durham	54.72°N 02.12°W	NY9237
Brothertoft	Lincolnshire	52.99°N 00.10°W	TF2746
Brotherton	Wakefield	53.71°N 01.27°W	SE4825
Brothybeck	Cumbria	54.77°N 03.02°W	NY3443
Brotton	Redcar and Cleveland	54.56°N 00.94°W	NZ6819
Broubster	Highland	58.51°N 03.66°W	ND0360
Brough	Cumbria	54.52°N 02.32°W	NY7914
Brough (Brough-on-Noe)	Derbyshire	53.33°N 01.73°W	SK1882
Brough	East Riding of Yorkshire	53.72°N 00.59°W	SE9326
Brough	Highland	58.63°N 03.34°W	ND2273
Brough	Nottinghamshire	53.11°N 00.76°W	SK8358
Brough (Brough of Birsay)	Orkney Islands	59.04°N 03.20°W	HY3118
Brough (Skellister)	Shetland Islands	60.26°N 01.15°W	HU4754
Brough (Tofts Voe)	Shetland Islands	60.47°N 01.21°W	HU4377
Brough (Whalsay)	Shetland Islands	60.35°N 01.00°W	HU5564
Broughall	Shropshire	52.96°N 02.65°W	SJ5641
Brough Head	Orkney Islands	59.13°N 03.34°W	HY234284
Brough Ness	Orkney Islands	58.73°N 02.95°W	ND447835
Brough Sowerby	Cumbria	54.50°N 02.32°W	NY7912
Broughton	Buckinghamshire	51.80°N 00.78°W	SP8413
Broughton	Cambridgeshire	52.37°N 00.12°W	TL2877
Broughton	City of Edinburgh	55.96°N 03.20°W	NT2575
Broughton	Flintshire	53.16°N 02.98°W	SJ3463
Broughton	Hampshire	51.08°N 01.57°W	SU3032
Broughton	Lancashire	53.80°N 02.73°W	SD5235
Broughton	Northamptonshire	52.36°N 00.78°W	SP8375
Broughton	North Lincolnshire	53.56°N 00.55°W	SE9608
Broughton (near Skipton)	North Yorkshire	53.95°N 02.09°W	SD9451
Broughton (near Malton)	North Yorkshire	54.14°N 00.83°W	SE7673
Broughton	Orkney Islands	59.31°N 02.98°W	HY4448
Broughton	Oxfordshire	52.03°N 01.38°W	SP4238
Broughton	Scottish Borders	55.61°N 03.41°W	NT1136
Broughton	Shropshire	52.51°N 02.29°W	SO8091
Broughton	Staffordshire	52.90°N 02.35°W	SJ7634
Broughton	The Vale Of Glamorgan	51.42°N 03.55°W	SS9271
Broughton Astley	Leicestershire	52.52°N 01.23°W	SP5292
Broughton Beck	Cumbria	54.22°N 03.10°W	SD2882
Broughton Common	North Lincolnshire	53.57°N 00.53°W	SE9710
Broughton Cross	Cumbria	54.65°N 03.44°W	NY0730
Broughton Gifford	Wiltshire	51.36°N 02.18°W	ST8763
Broughton Green	Worcestershire	52.24°N 02.07°W	SO9561
Broughton Hackett	Worcestershire	52.18°N 02.11°W	SO9254
Broughton in Furness	Cumbria	54.27°N 03.21°W	SD2187
Broughton Lodges	Leicestershire	52.80°N 00.96°W	SK7024
Broughton Mills	Cumbria	54.30°N 03.20°W	SD2290
Broughton Moor	Cumbria	54.68°N 03.47°W	NY0533
Broughton Park	Salford	53.50°N 02.25°W	SD8301
Broughton Poggs	Oxfordshire	51.72°N 01.66°W	SP2303
Broughtown	Orkney Islands	59.25°N 02.61°W	HY6541
Broughty Ferry	City of Dundee	56.45°N 02.87°W	NO4630

=== Brow-Broy ===
Location	Locality	Coordinates (links to map & photo sources)	OS grid reference
Brow Edge	Cumbria	54.24°N 02.99°W	SD3584
Browhouses	Dumfries and Galloway	54.96°N 03.12°W	NY2864
Browland	Shetland Islands	60.23°N 01.51°W	HU2750
Brown Bank	North Yorkshire	53.97°N 01.68°W	SE2153
Brownber	Cumbria	54.44°N 02.46°W	NY7005
Brownbread Street	East Sussex	50.91°N 00.38°E	TQ6815
Brown Candover	Hampshire	51.14°N 01.18°W	SU5739
Brown Edge	Lancashire	53.61°N 02.96°W	SD3614
Brown Edge	St Helens	53.43°N 02.75°W	SJ5093
Brownedge	Cheshire	53.16°N 02.34°W	SJ7763
Brown Edge	Staffordshire	53.07°N 02.15°W	SJ9053
Browney	Durham	54.78°N 01.62°W	NZ243393
Brown Head	North Ayrshire	55.46°N 05.31°W	NR908240
Brown Heath	Cheshire	53.17°N 02.82°W	SJ4564
Brown Heath	Hampshire	50.94°N 01.26°W	SU5216
Brownheath	Devon	50.92°N 03.22°W	ST1415
Brownheath	Shropshire	52.85°N 02.80°W	SJ4629
Brownheath Common	Worcestershire	52.23°N 02.16°W	SO8960
Brownhill	Aberdeenshire	57.47°N 02.11°W	NJ9343
Brownhill	Lancashire	53.76°N 02.48°W	SD6830
Brownhill	Shropshire	52.79°N 02.89°W	SJ4022
Brownhills	Walsall	52.64°N 01.94°W	SK0405
Brownhills	Shropshire	52.91°N 02.49°W	SJ6735
Brownhills	Fife	56.32°N 02.77°W	NO5215
Browninghill Green	Hampshire	51.32°N 01.16°W	SU5859
Brown Knowl	Cheshire	53.07°N 02.76°W	SJ4953
Brown Lees	Staffordshire	53.10°N 02.19°W	SJ8756
Brownlow	St Helens	53.50°N 02.72°W	SD5201
Brownlow	Cheshire	53.14°N 02.27°W	SJ8261
Brownlow Fold	Bolton	53.58°N 02.45°W	SD7010
Brownlow Heath	Cheshire	53.13°N 02.27°W	SJ8260
Brown Moor	Leeds	53.79°N 01.43°W	SE3733
Brown's Bank	Cheshire	52.98°N 02.53°W	SJ6443
Brownsea Island	Dorset	50.69°N 01.97°W	SZ021880
Brown's End	Gloucestershire	52.00°N 02.38°W	SO7434
Brown's Green	Birmingham	52.51°N 01.94°W	SP0491
Brownshill	Gloucestershire	51.71°N 02.17°W	SO8802
Brownshill Green	Coventry	52.43°N 01.56°W	SP3082
Brownside	Lancashire	53.78°N 02.21°W	SD8632
Brownsover	Warwickshire	52.38°N 01.25°W	SP5177
Brownston	Devon	50.35°N 03.84°W	SX6952
Brown Street	Suffolk	52.22°N 01.01°E	TM0663
Browns Wood	Milton Keynes	52.00°N 00.69°W	SP9035
Browston Green	Norfolk	52.55°N 01.67°E	TG4901
Browtop	Cumbria	54.60°N 03.45°W	NY0624
Broxa	North Yorkshire	54.31°N 00.55°W	SE9491
Broxbourne	Hertfordshire	51.74°N 00.03°W	TL3607
Broxburn	East Lothian	55.98°N 02.49°W	NT6977
Broxburn	West Lothian	55.93°N 03.47°W	NT0872
Broxfield	Northumberland	55.43°N 01.68°W	NU2016
Broxholme	Lincolnshire	53.28°N 00.63°W	SK9177
Broxted	Essex	51.91°N 00.28°E	TL5726
Broxton	Cheshire	53.08°N 02.79°W	SJ4754
Broxtowe	Nottinghamshire	52.97°N 01.22°W	SK5242
Broxwood	Herefordshire	52.18°N 02.93°W	SO3654
Broyle Side	East Sussex	50.89°N 00.07°E	TQ4613
