= Brook Bay =

Bay on the Isle of Wight, England

Coordinates: 50°39′00″N 1°27′54″W

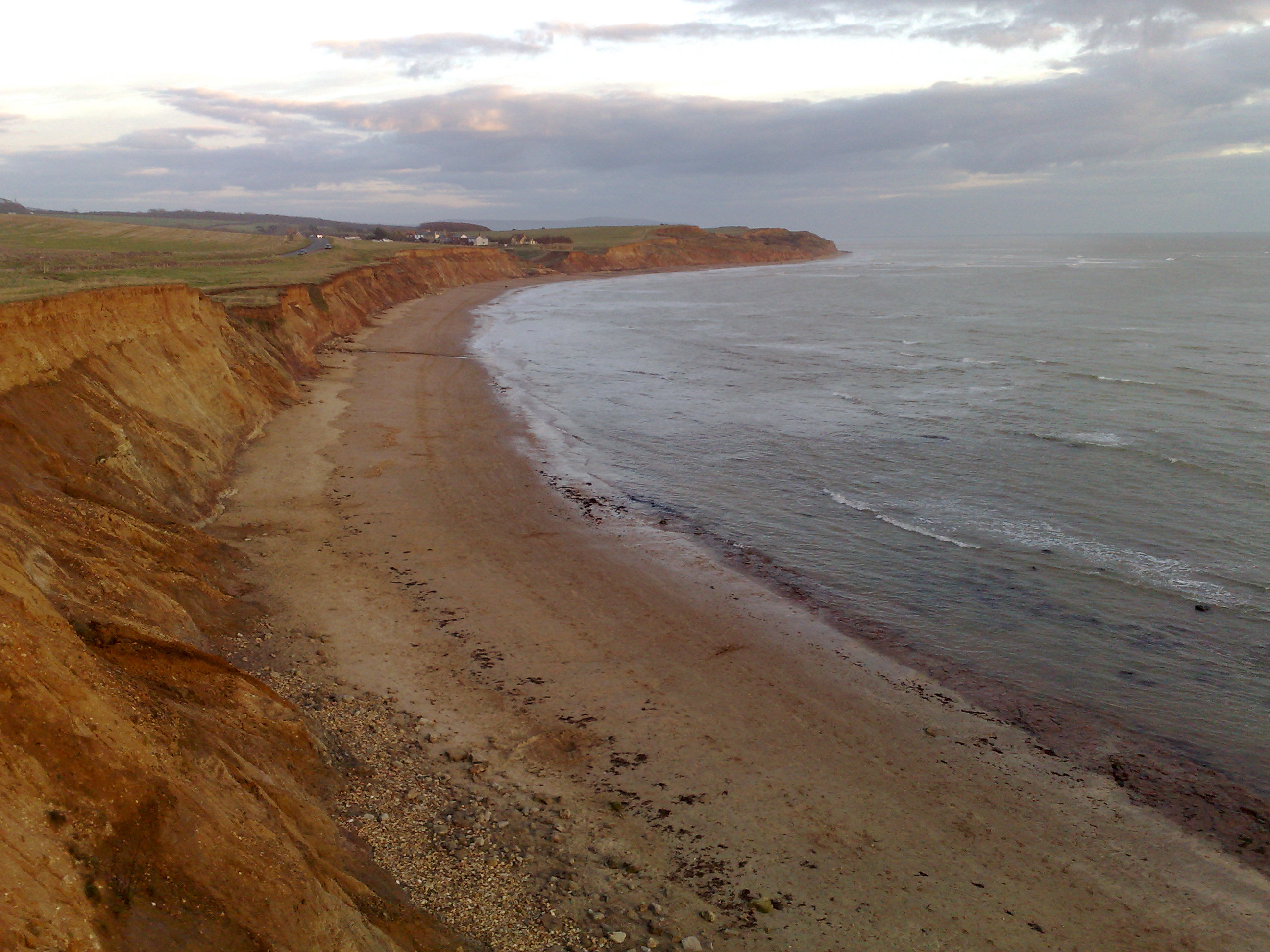
- Brook Bay from Hanover Point

- Location within the Isle of Wight
- Civil parish: Brighstone
- Ceremonial county: Isle of Wight
- Region: South East
- Country: England
- Sovereign state: United Kingdom

Brook Bay (also spelt Brooke Bay) is a bay on the south western coast of the Isle of Wight, England. It lies to the west of the village of Brook. It faces southwest out into the English Channel. It stretches about 1 1/4 miles (2 km) from Hanover Point in the east to Sudmoor Point to the west, the bay is part of the Compton Chine to Steephill Cove Site of Special Scientific Interest. Much of the surrounding land, including the hamlet of Brookgreen is owned by the National Trust.

The beach at Brook Bay is predominantly sandy, though the seabed varies; to the west, it features the hazardous Brook Ledges, while the area near the concrete slipway remains largely rock-free. Both Brook Chine and Churchill Chine empty into Brook Bay. The bay is known for its paleontological significance, with dinosaur remains, including teeth and bone fragments, frequently discovered along the shore. A submerged fossilized forest can also be seen beneath the waves at Hanover Point during low tide. The geology is Cretaceous. On the bedding planes, Ripple marks and dinosaur footprints can often be seen. A trackway found at the bay is held by the Dinosaur Isle Museum.

The bay is best accessed from the nearby car park and the slipway down to the beach. The Isle of Wight Coastal Path runs along the cliff edge for the entire extent of the bay.
