= Churchill Chine =

Churchill Chine on the Isle of Wight

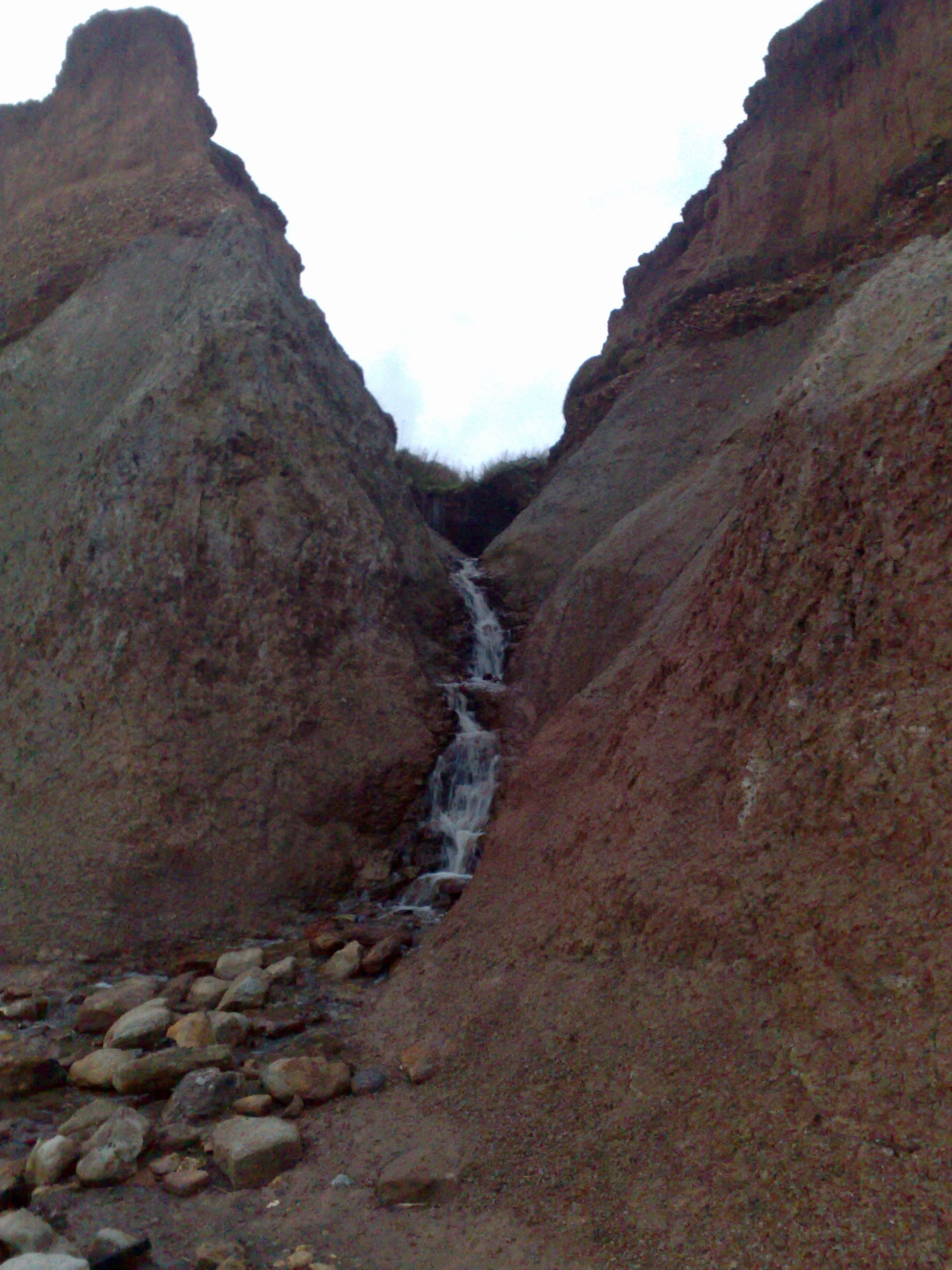
Churchill Chine

Churchill Chine is a geological feature on the south west coast of the Isle of Wight, England. It is west of the village of Brook and just east of Hanover Point. It is a small sandy coastal gully, one of a number of such chines on the island created by stream erosion of soft Cretaceous rocks. It leads from the 30 foot high clifftop to the beach of Brook Bay.

The Chine carries water from a lake about 100m to the north, just across the nearby Military Road and also from a small brook that runs down the hillside from Dunsbury. The gully contains a small waterfall which drops down to the beach.

The Isle of Wight Coastal Path crosses the top of the chine via a small footbridge.
