= Broughton Cross railway station =

Disused railway station in Cumbria, England

Broughton Cross

General information
- Location: Broughton Cross, Cumberland; England
- Coordinates: 54.65946°N 3.43425°W
- Grid reference: NY075303
- Platforms: 2

Other information
- Status: Disused

History
- Original company: Cockermouth & Workington Railway
- Pre-grouping: London and North Western Railway
- Post-grouping: London, Midland and Scottish Railway

Key dates
- 28 April 1847: Opened
- 2 March 1942: Closed
Location

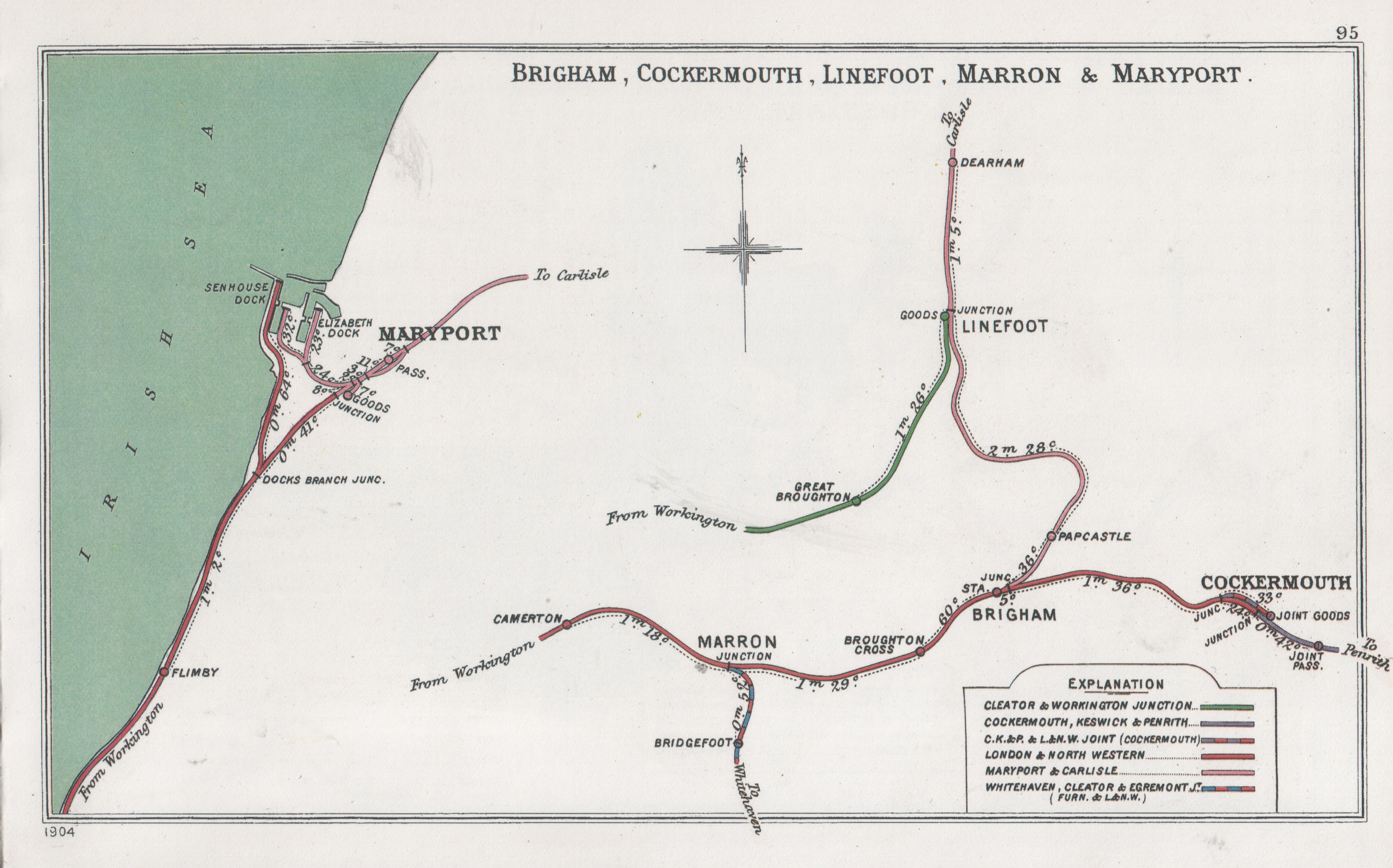
A 1904 Railway Clearing House Junction Diagram showing (right) railways in the vicinity of the station

Broughton Cross railway station was situated on the Cockermouth and Workington Railway and served the village of Broughton Cross, Cumbria, England.

== History ==
The station opened on 28 April 1847 and closed on 2 March 1942.

== Afterlife ==
By 2013 the station site was buried under the A66.

Preceding station	Disused railways	Following station
Brigham; Line and station closed	Whitehaven, Cleator and Egremont Railway	Bridgefoot; Line and station closed
Brigham; Line and station closed	London and North Western Railway; Cockermouth & Workington Railway	Marron Junction; Line and station closed

== See also ==
- Cockermouth, Keswick and Penrith Railway
