= Achavanich Beaker Burial =

Archaeological find in Caithness, Scotland

Ava
- Common name: Ava
- Species: Homo sapiens
- Age: abt. 3806 ± 21 BP (2300–2145 cal BCE)
- Place discovered: Achavanich, Caithness, Scotland
- Date discovered: February 1987
- Discovered by: William and Graham Ganson

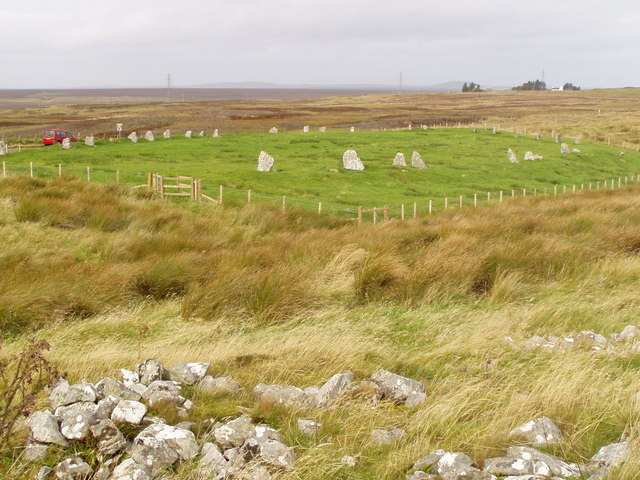
Achavanich Stone Setting located near the burial site

The Achavanich Beaker Burial refers to the remains of a prehistoric woman who lived around 4,000 years ago in the area of present day Achavanich, Caithness, Scotland. Ava, as she is now known, was discovered in 1987 by William and Graham Ganson and excavated by regional archaeologist Robert Gourlay, from the Highland Regional Council, and two assistant archaeologists: Gemma Corcoran and Sarah Hargreaves. Ava was found interred in a burial cist with a beaker, flints, a cow scapula, and possibly flowers.

== Burial ==
=== Excavation ===
On 19 February 1987 Robert Gourlay, Gemma Corcoran and Sarah Hargreaves conducted the excavation of a burial cist in Achavanich, Caithness, Scotland. Prior to the excavation, a beaker had been found inside and removed by the people who stumbled upon the site. The team executed a well planned removal of the remains from the cist, starting with the removal of debris. The discovery and extraction of an ox scapula was next, followed by the removal of the cap stone and the other collapse stone. Finally the team was able to get access to and carefully excavate the remains. After their withdrawal, the remaining stones were removed. Throughout this entire process the group took many photos, allowing for the understanding of the steps they took to complete the excavation. The photographs also provide documentation on how the cist and remains appeared prior to their removal which allows for further interpretation of the burial.

=== Interpretation ===
It has been interpreted that Ava would have been lying on her back and turned slightly to her right with her knees close to her chin. Both the beaker and the flints that were found buried with her were believed to have been placed up by her head. The ox scapula was likely placed upon Ava's left shoulder by the people who buried her. It is possible that she was also laid to rest with flowers due to the beaker showing evidence of pollen residue. Although there is no physical trace of clothing, Ava would have likely been wearing some type of covering made from animal hide.

== Ava ==
=== Osteology ===
Approximately 41–60% of the skeleton remains intact today, including a majority of the skull, left femur, and some thoracic and lumbar vertebrae. Most of the missing bones belong to the mid to upper left section of the skeleton, such as the entire left arm, left ribcage, and mandible. More than half of the pelvis is absent, which caused more difficulty in the determination of sex. Examination of the cranium revealed defining female sexual dimorphic characteristics, like the absence of a brow ridge, which aided in the conclusion that the remains are female. The skull also appears to be very broad and short with a cranial index of 89.6, classified as hyperbrachycephalic, which is unusually high in comparison to modern day humans. Fusion of the epiphyseal plates suggests the remains belong to an individual from the age range of 18–22 years old. The height was calculated to be approximately 1.67 meters tall by use of tibia measurement.

=== Radiocarbon dating and histology ===
There have been three tests conducted in relation to the Achavanich burial. The first radiocarbon dating test of Ava's remains occurred a couple years after she was discovered in 1987. Her entire right femur was used for testing and the results estimated her radiocarbon age to be approximately 3700 ± 50 before present. In 2017 a sample of Ava's right tibia and a piece of the cattle scapula was sent to the Scottish Universities Environmental Research Centre (SUERC) for further analysis. This time Ava was dated to be around 3827 ± 33 before present and the cattle scapula to date close to 3829 ± 32 before present. The mean age range for the Achavanich burial was concluded to be 3806 ± 21 before present. In addition to testing age, three of Ava's bones were examined in order to determine if Ava was buried soon after death. The histology of her femur, metacarpal, and rib reported a high level of bacterial bioerosion. These results imply that Ava was more than likely buried intact shortly after death.

=== Facial reconstruction ===
Ava's facial reconstruction was done by forensic artist Hew Morrison. To avoid causing further damage to the skull, a two-dimensional approach to reconstruction was taken. Photographs were taken of the skull using the Frankfort Horizontal Plane positioning, a method that simulates the natural resting position of the head. The absence of the mandible and the damage to the left zygomatic bone created issue for the reconstruction. To recreate the structure of the left zygomatic bone, Morrison used the shape of the right side and mirrored it on the left. As for the missing mandible, Morrison used techniques written and developed by Wilton M. Krogman in his book, The Human Skeleton in Forensic Medicine. Measurements of the nasal aperture, teeth, and eye orbits were taken in order to determine the size of Ava's nose, lips, and, eyes. Next the muscle and skin was added. By referencing modern tissue depths of the average white European female between the ages of 18 and 22, Morrison was able to recreate the depth between the bone and skin. Several facial features from various individuals with similar facial measurements were compiled and selected as likely matches for Ava. These features were then blended onto Ava's reconstructed face. In 2016, Ava's hair, skin, and eye color were determined based on the current population of Caithness and she was depicted with brown hair, blue eyes, and light colored skin. However, in 2017, Inigo Olalde from the Reich Laboratory at Harvard Medical School discovered, based on her ancient DNA, that Ava in actuality had very different coloring, most likely with black hair, brown eyes and tanned skin.

== Finds ==
=== Beaker ===
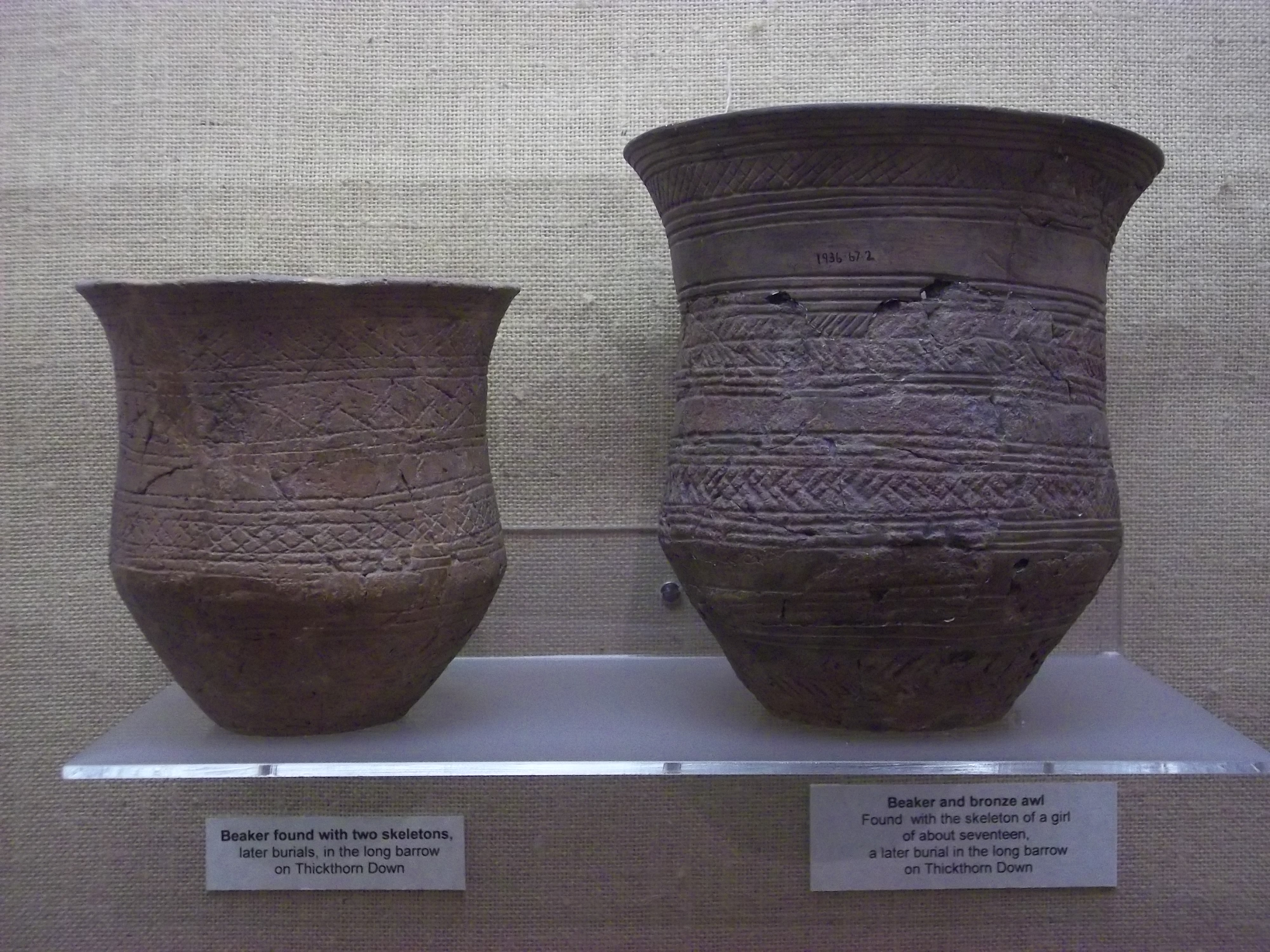
Bell-beakers found with secondary burials in the long barrow on Thickthorn Down, around 250 meters southeast of the southwest terminal of the Dorset Cursus, similar to the beaker found with Ava.

The beaker was found in the burial cist nearly completely intact. It measures 16.5 cm in height and is decorated with comb incisions that form horizontal lines, herringbone, triangular and criss-cross impressions. These types of beakers were not uncommon to be found in northern Scotland. In fact, in Caithness alone there have been 9 other sites where beakers and sherds from relatively the same time period have been found. Further analysis of the beaker revealed the presence of multiple different types of pollen, including meadowsweet, pine, and birch. Although there was not enough pollen residue to conclude what, if anything, was held in the beaker at the time of burial.

=== Cattle scapula ===
Also found buried with Ava was an adult left cattle scapula. There were dry breaks to the bone which were likely a result of postmortem influence, either by the people who killed the cow or from natural breakage. The scapula shows no evidence of human manipulation for tool use, allowing for the conclusion that it was likely placed in the tomb with flesh still present on the bone as a food offering to Ava.

=== Flints ===
There were three separate flints buried with Ava: two flakes and the other a thumbnail scraper. Unfortunately these pieces were lost sometime between their discovery in 1987 and the recent reinvestigation of the burial site.
