= Achavanich =

Megalithic structure in Caithness, Scotland

Coordinates: 58°21′23.80″N 3°23′22.68″W

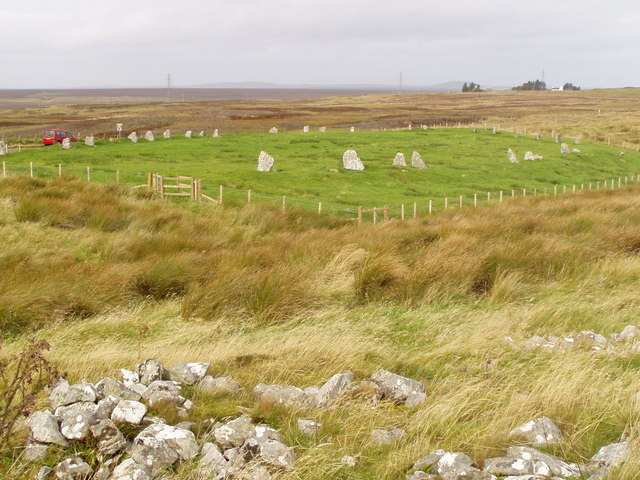
Achavanich Stone Setting Achavanich Stone Setting from the nearby Achkinloch Chambered Cairn

Achavanich (/ˌækəˈvænɪk/ ak-ə-VAN-ik; Scottish Gaelic: Achadh a’ Mhanaich) is an unusual megalithic horseshoe-shaped structure near Loch Stemster in Caithness, Scotland. Meaning "field of the stones", 36 of the original 54 remain today, mostly on the western side of the structure. The arrangement of these stones is extremely rare as the slabs are pointing towards the centre of the circle, rather than the typical side-by-side arrangement. The angle of the stones themselves is also strange. In most British stone circles, stones face the center with flat sides, but Achavanich's stones face the row at 90 degree angles. The stone circle remains open like a letter U, and evidence suggests it never was closed. The largest of the 36 remaining stones stands at only 2 meters, with an overall average of 1.5 meters tall. Although the site stood for several decades neglected and overgrown within a fenced off area which visitors were requested not to enter, access has recently been vastly improved with the clearance of the site, the repositioning of fence boundaries and the installation of information boards.

== Background ==
Achavanich is located near Loch Stemster in Caithness, Scotland. The tallest of its relatively small stones is 2 m (6 ft 6 in) high. Some stones may have been taller, but weathering has caused them to crack and split. Only 36 stones remain in the setting, although there may have been about 54 originally.

At most stone circles the flat faces of the stones follow the line of the setting, but at Achavanich the flat faces are 'side on'. The stone slabs appear to be set into a low mound of earth and stone, possibly the result of leveling the central area. The purpose and date of this structure are unknown, but it is usually assumed to belong to the Bronze Age.

Outside the northeast corner of the setting are some small slabs (possibly the remains of cist burials) protruding through the turf. Close to the southeast there are also the remains of a chambered cairn, situated on a knoll.

The only other site with a similar structure is at Broubster, 23 km away, where 9 stones of a 32 stone setting survive, with the open end of the setting in Broubster at the south-south-west. The open end at Achavanich is at the south-east.

Achavanich is estimated to be around 4000 years old, still young compared to 5000 year old beaker burial mounds that litter the area. The structure was built of rock from the Caithness flagstone group. The purpose of this stone circle is still unknown, but discovered bones may suggest that the structure served as a ritual site.
