= Salterhebble =

Area of Halifax, West Yorkshire, England

Coordinates: 53.701°N 1.855°W

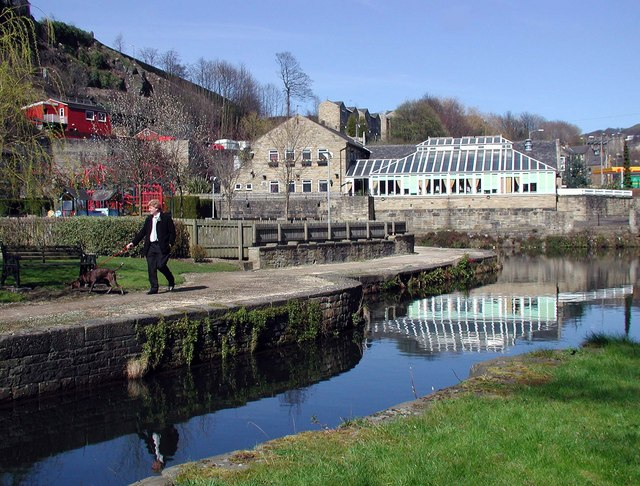
Salterhebble, West Yorkshire

Salterhebble is an area of Halifax, a town within the Metropolitan Borough of Calderdale, in West Yorkshire, England. The town falls within the Skircoat ward of Calderdale Council. Salterhebble is located where the Hebble Brook flows into the River Calder. It is on the main route into Halifax from Huddersfield and Brighouse. Salterhebble is the home of Calderdale Royal Hospital, a school, a fast food restaurant, a funeral parlour (formerly The Falcon pub) and one active pub, The Watermill. Some former pubs in the village included The Punch Bowl, The Falcon and The Stafford Arms.

The place-name 'Salterhebble' means "the salt-sellers' foot-bridge".

== Hospital ==
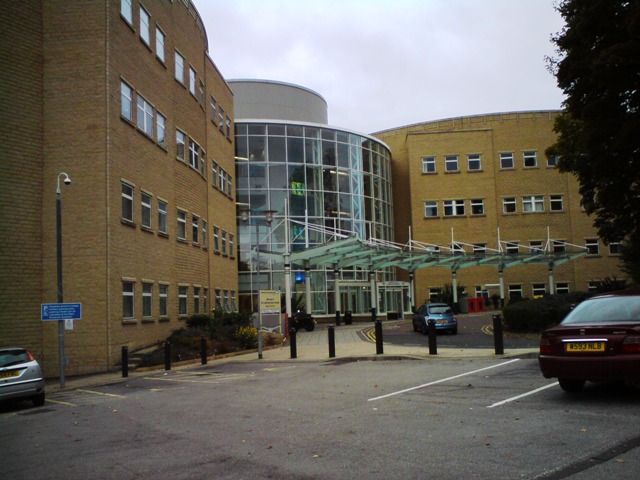
Calderdale Royal Hospital, Halifax

Calderdale Royal Hospital (part of Calderdale & Huddersfield NHS Foundation Trust) is located in Salterhebble. It has specialist departments and Calderdale's A&E department and the Calderdale Birth Centre. The hospital was built and opened in 2001, on the site of the original Halifax General Hospital, following the merger with the Royal Halifax Infirmary.

== Canal ==
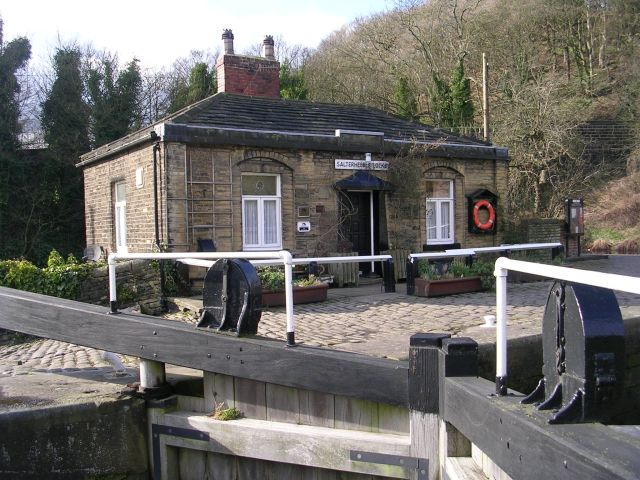
Salterhebble Lock Keeper's Cottage

The Calder and Hebble Navigation has a short branch at Salterhebble. This is officially called the Halifax Arm (because it used to lead into the town centre), but is usually called the Salterhebble Arm. The branch terminates at Salterhebble Basin. Next to the point where the branch leaves the main line is the triple flight of Salterhebble Locks, one of which is a candidate for the shortest lock on the connected inland waterway system of Britain.

== Notable people ==
Jesse Ramsden - Eighteenth-century scientific instrument-maker.

== Streets ==
The main road in Salterhebble is the A629 Huddesfield Road/Salterhebble Hill. Other streets located in the village are: Chapel Lane, Rookery Lane, Falcon Street, Bristol Street, Exeter Street, Doncaster Street, Crossley Hill, Westbourne Grove, Westbourne Crescent, Haigh Lane, Rhodesia Avenue, Stafford Parade, Stafford Square, Stafford Road, Stafford Avenue, Limes Avenue, Coronation Street, Abbey Walk, Mansion Lane, St Albans Croft, Kliffen Place, Cheltenham Place and Cheltenham Gardens.
