= Brook Chine =

Brook Chine on the Isle of Wight

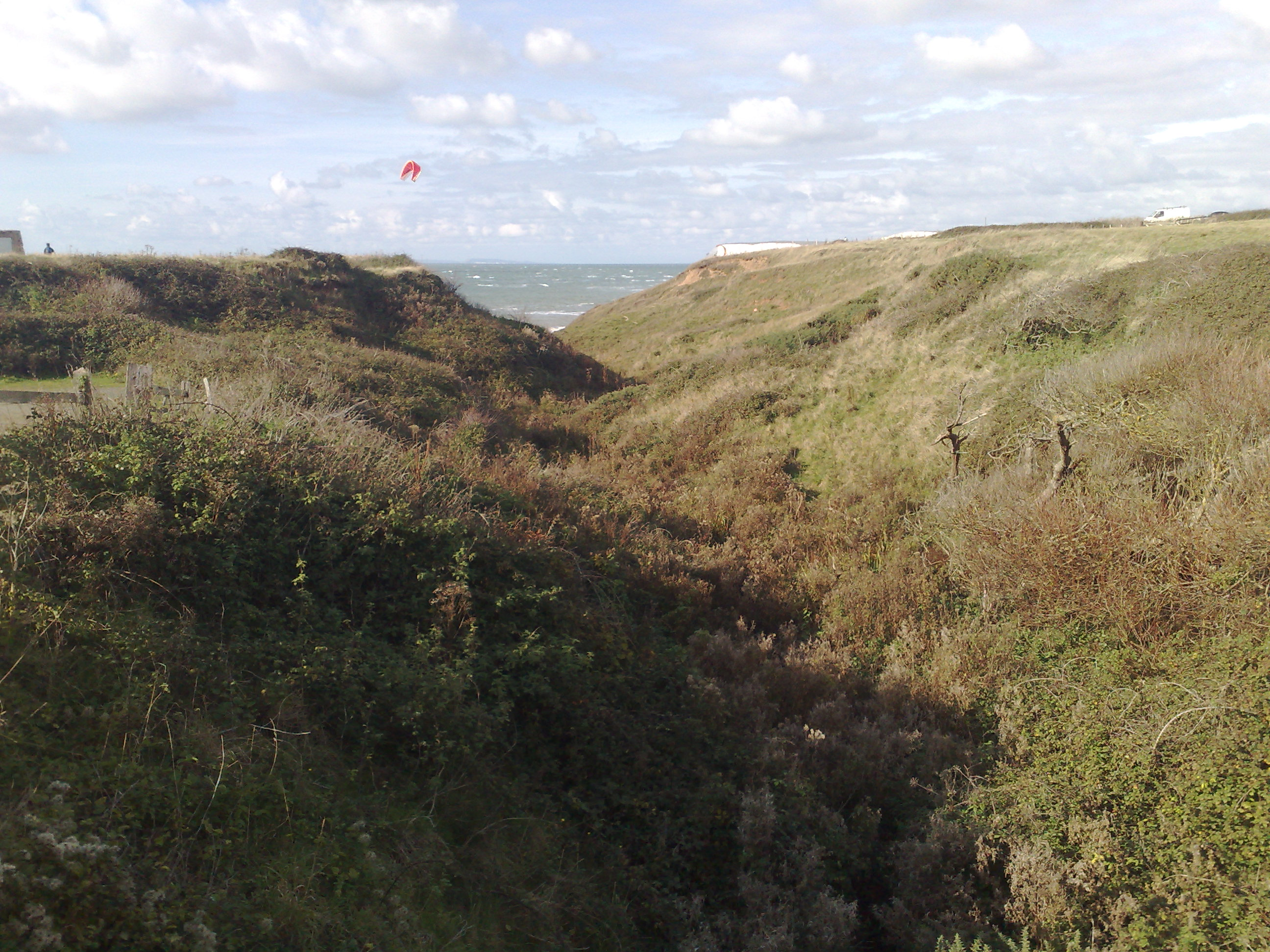
Brook Chine

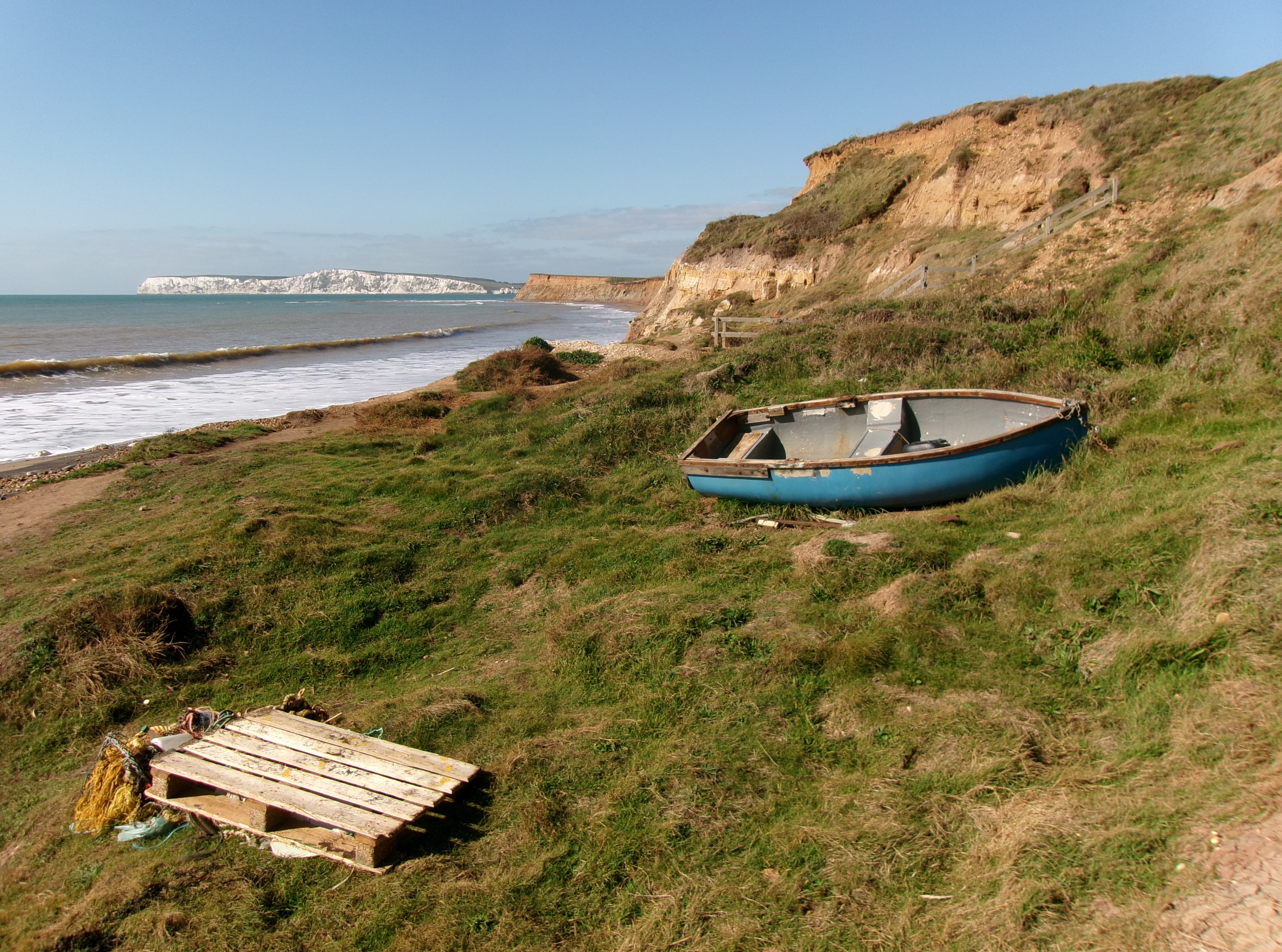
Coastline at the bottom of the chine

Brook Chine is a geological feature on the south west coast of the Isle of Wight, England. It lies just to the west of the village of Brook. The hamlet of Brookgreen runs along its southern edge.

It is a small coastal gully, one of a number of such chines on the island created by stream erosion of soft Cretaceous rocks. It runs from the A3055 Military Road about 300m due West to the beach at Brook Bay just south of Hanover Point. The sides of the gully are fairly shallow and allow the growth of hardy bushes, scrub and rough grasses.

The Chine drains water from fairly flat agricultural land that extends from Mottistone Down in the north to the coast in the south and almost to the next chine, Chilton Chine to the east.

The Isle of Wight Coastal Path crosses the chine via the road bridge on the A3055 bridge.
