= Handspike =

Metal tool used for prying or leverage

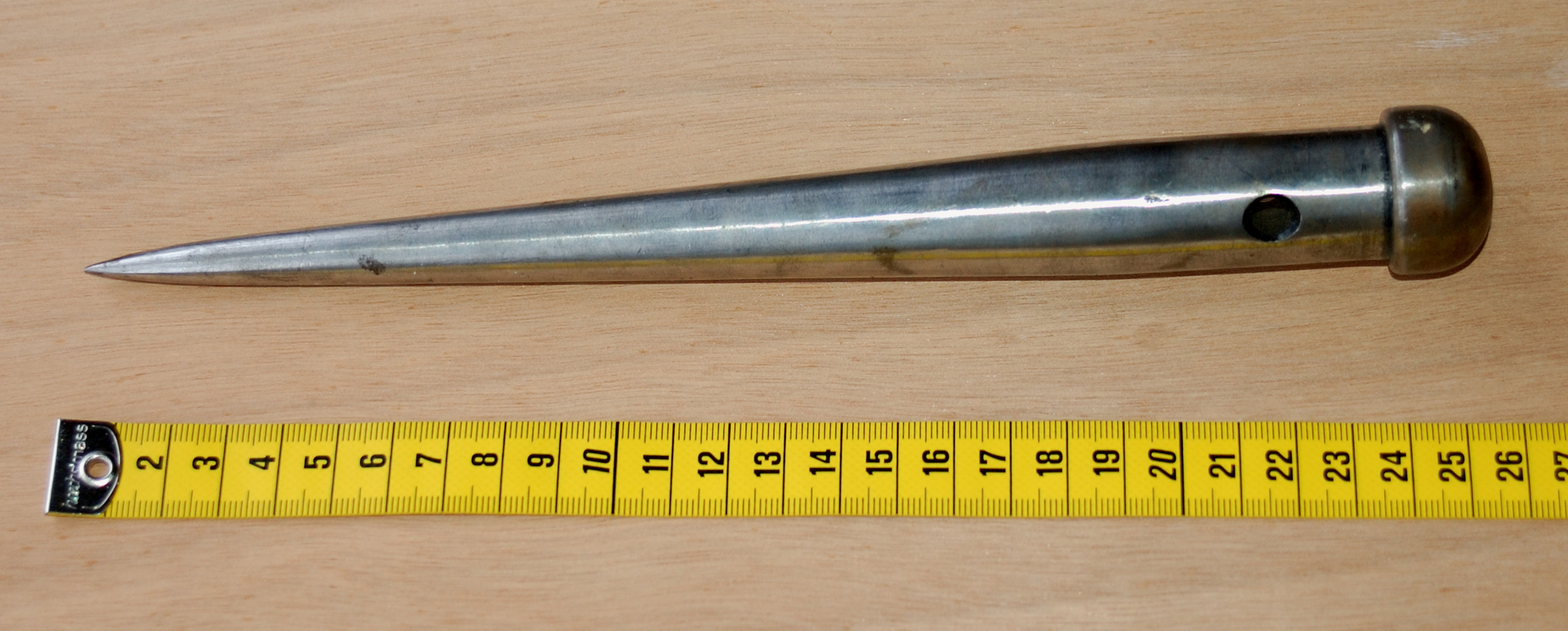

A handspike is a metal bar or pipe that is used as a lever for prying or leverage, similar to a crowbar. Handspike is also an archaic term for a bar or lever, generally of wood, used in a windlass or capstan, for heaving anchor, and, in modified forms, for various other purposes.

On the Calder and Hebble Navigation in England, a handspike in the form of a length of 2-by-4-inch (5 by 10 cm) timber shaped at one end to provide a comfortable two-handed grip is used to operate the winding gear of some of the locks.
