= Browtop =

Village in Cumbria, England

Coordinates: 54.602°N 3.440°W

- Location in Allerdale, Cumbria Location within Cumbria
- OS grid reference: NY0624
- Civil parish: Dean
- Unitary authority: Cumberland
- Ceremonial county: Cumbria
- Region: North West
- Country: England
- Sovereign state: United Kingdom
- Post town: WORKINGTON
- Postcode district: CA14
- Dialling code: 01900
- Police: Cumbria
- Fire: Cumbria
- Ambulance: North West
- UK Parliament: Whitehaven and Workington

Browtop is a hamlet in Cumbria, England.
