= Brooks End =

Hamlet in Kent, England

Coordinates: 51.364°N 1.293°E

Brooksend
- Location within Kent
- Civil parish: Birchington
- District: Thanet
- Shire county: Kent
- Region: South East
- Country: England
- Sovereign state: United Kingdom
- Post town: Birchington
- Postcode district: CT7
- Police: Kent
- Fire: Kent
- Ambulance: South East Coast
- UK Parliament: Herne Bay and Sandwich

Brooks End is a hamlet assimilated with Birchington, in Kent, England, and 1 mile (1.6 km) southwest of the village's centre. It is in the Thanet local government district and is located on the A28 road to Canterbury. The hamlet is located on the area once under the sea at the Wantsum Channel, and is probably named after one of the numerous brooks covering the area. Nearby is Great Brooksend Farm.
