= Broomedge =

Coordinates: 53.36°N 02.45°W

- Location within Cheshire
- OS grid reference: SJ7085
- Unitary authority: Warrington
- Ceremonial county: Cheshire
- Region: North West
- Country: England
- Sovereign state: United Kingdom
- Police: Cheshire
- Fire: Cheshire
- Ambulance: North West

Broomedge is a village in Cheshire, England.
