= Brookfoot =

Coordinates: 53.70°N 01.80°W

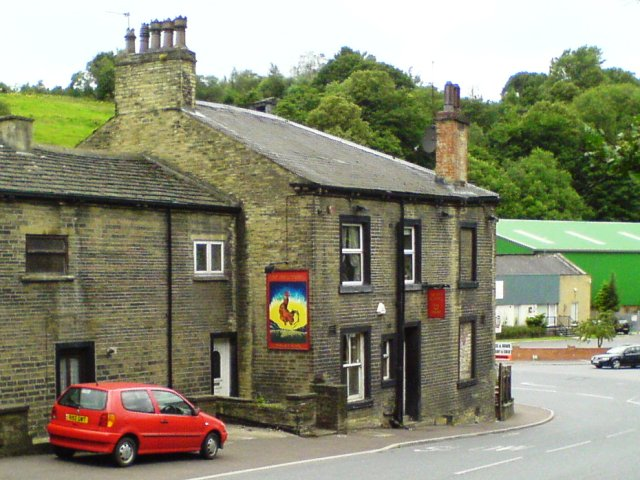
- Red Rooster public house

- Location within West Yorkshire
- OS grid reference: SE1323
- Metropolitan county: West Yorkshire
- Region: Yorkshire and the Humber
- Country: England
- Sovereign state: United Kingdom
- Post town: brighouse
- Postcode district: HD6
- Police: West Yorkshire
- Fire: West Yorkshire
- Ambulance: Yorkshire

Brookfoot is a village in Calderdale West Yorkshire, England. It lies between the towns of Elland and Brighouse on the A6025 (Elland Road). The Calder and Hebble Navigation and the River Calder runs through Brookfoot. Near the River and canal there is a 3½-acre (1.4 hectares) lake known as Brookfoot lake owned by The Brighouse Angling Association.

== See also ==
- Elland
- Brighouse
