= Broomyshaw =

Hamlet in Staffordshire, England

Coordinates: 53.03°N 01.91°W

- Location within Staffordshire
- OS grid reference: SK0649
- Shire county: Staffordshire
- Region: West Midlands
- Country: England
- Sovereign state: United Kingdom
- Post town: Leek
- Postcode district: ST13
- Police: Staffordshire
- Fire: Staffordshire
- Ambulance: West Midlands
- UK Parliament: Staffordshire Moorlands

Broomyshaw is a hamlet in Staffordshire, England. Population details for the 2011 census can be found under Waterhouses, Staffordshire
