= Broughton Cross =

Hamlet in Cumbria, England

Coordinates: 54.659°N 3.434°W

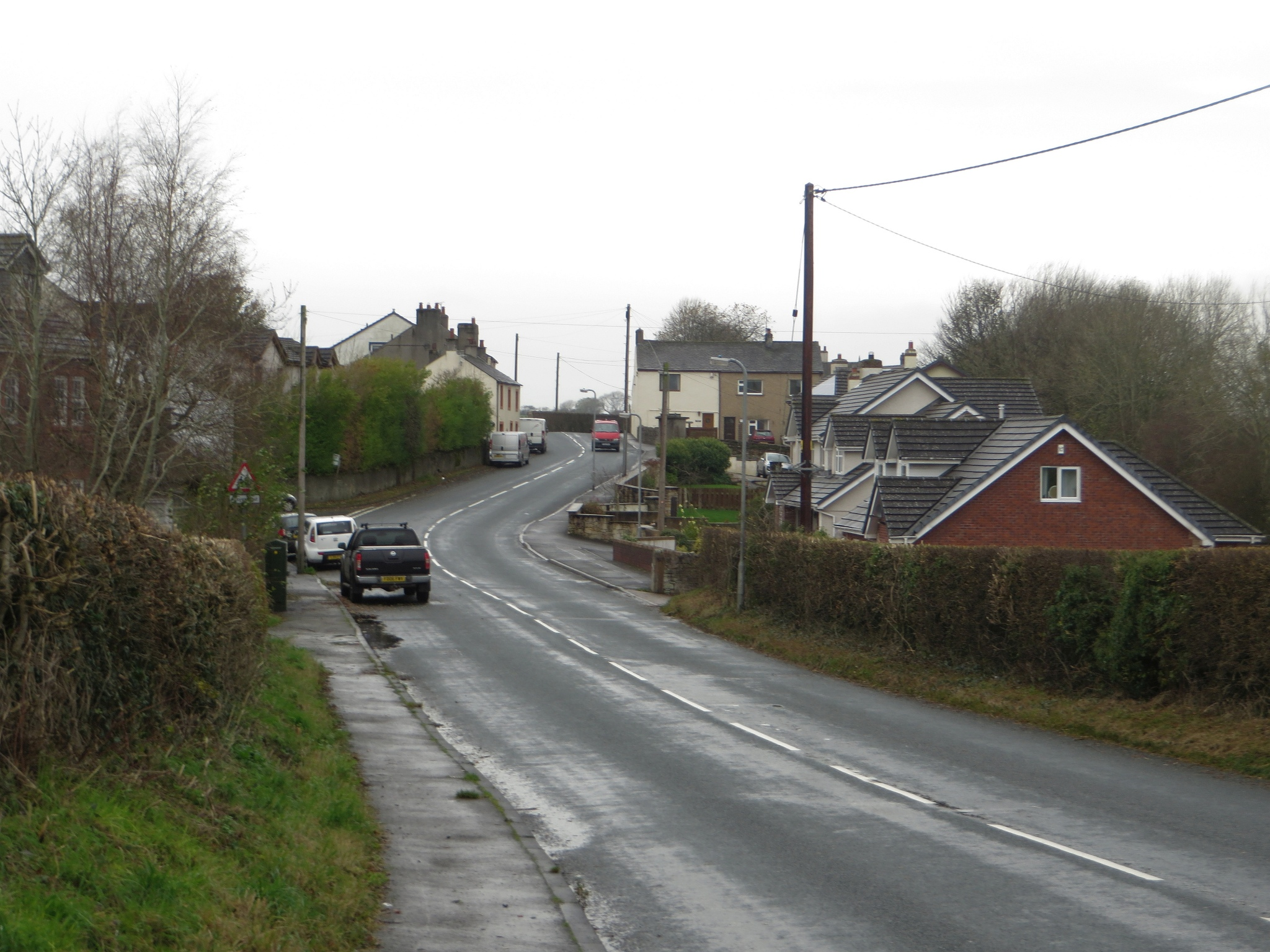
- The road through Broughton Cross

- Location in Allerdale, Cumbria Location within Cumbria
- OS grid reference: NY075302
- Civil parish: Brigham
- Unitary authority: Cumberland
- Ceremonial county: Cumbria
- Region: North West
- Country: England
- Sovereign state: United Kingdom
- Post town: COCKERMOUTH
- Postcode district: CA13
- Dialling code: 01900
- Police: Cumbria
- Fire: Cumbria
- Ambulance: North West
- UK Parliament: Penrith and Solway

Broughton Cross is a hamlet in the county of Cumbria, England. Nearby settlements include the villages of Brigham and Great Broughton. It was on the A66 road until it was by-passed. It had a railway station called Broughton Cross railway station which opened on 28 April 1847 and closed on 2 March 1942.
