= Brosdale Island =

Island in Argyll and Bute, Scotland

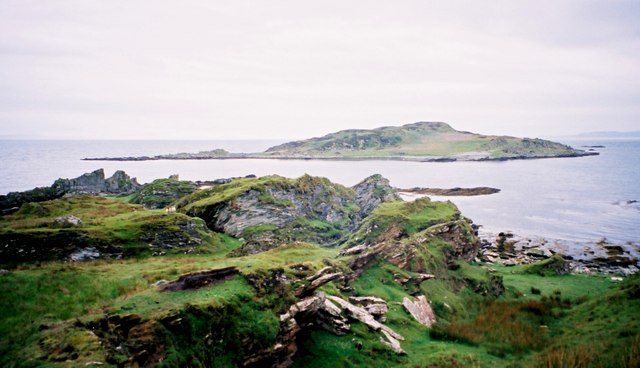

Location
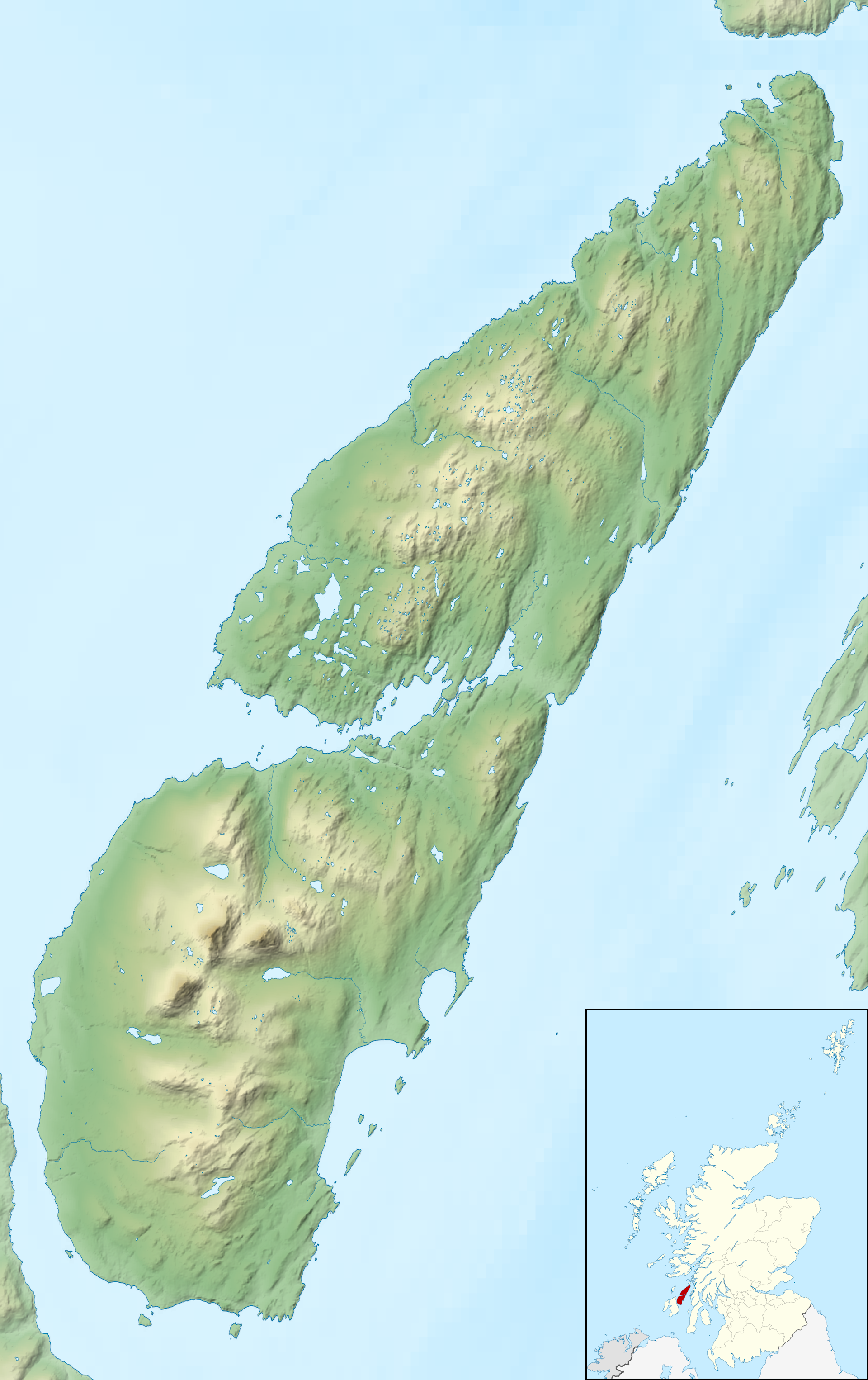
- Brosdale Island shown next to Jura Brosdale Island within Argyll and Bute
- OS grid reference: NR4983462323
- Coordinates: 55.789393°N 5.9921890°W

Physical geography
- Island group: Inner Hebrides
- Highest elevation: 36 m (118 ft)

Administration
- Council area: Argyll and Bute
- Country: Scotland
- Sovereign state: United Kingdom

Demographics
- Population: 0

Brosdale Island is an uninhabited island in the council area of Argyll and Bute, Scotland. It is 1.25 miles from Jura House on Jura. It is about 1/4 of a mile long and 1/4 of a mile wide.

The earliest comprehensive written list of Hebridean island names was undertaken in the 16th century by Donald Monro in his 16th century Description of the Western Isles of Scotland. Brosdale is not mentioned by name although there is a laconic entry referring to a Hasil Iyle "which in the Erish is callit Ellan-na-Crawiche". R. W. Munro was unable to identify the location of Hasil Iyle but writing 40 years later Peter Youngson suggested that Monro was referring to Brosdale. He did not offer a specific explanation for his identification although Brosdale does lie between Am Fraoch Eilean to the west and Eilean nan Gabhar in the Small Isles of Jura to the north which are more readily identifiable. (Note: Youngson provides a number of other identifications that Munro was unable to offer a solution for but there are alternatives and although Monro is almost certainly referring to an Eilean Fraoch for the island neighbouring Hasil Iyle there are other contenders. In fact, Munro believed that "Ellan charn" later in Monro's list referred to Am Fraoch Eilean ("At the mouth of Kyle Ila, betwixt it and Duray, lyes ane ile, callit in Erische Leid Ellan Charne, in English the iyle of Earne". See Description of the Western Isles of Scotland for further details.) However, Matheson suggests that Monro's "Ellan charn" may be Brosdale Island.

== Etymology ==
Youngson simply notes that "this beautiful island seems to have had various different names during its history". Matheson, as evidence for his idea that Brosdale is Ellan charn, states that it "appears on an old map as Chreig Yl.?" and mentions that the modern name has "obviously been re-named after Brosdale on the mainland of Jura opposite". 'Brosdale' is clearly Norse in origin, dalr meaning valley. 'Bros' is harder to interpret but may be from brok, meaning "bad, black grass". Hasil Iyle/Ellan-na-Crawiche suggests a wooded island, whereas Monipennie suggests that Ellan charn takes its name "from a cairne of stones".
