= Browhouses =

Coordinates: 54.974065°N 3.125150°W

- Location within Dumfries and Galloway
- OS grid reference: NY2864
- Council area: Dumfries and Galloway
- Country: Scotland
- Sovereign state: United Kingdom
- Police: Scotland
- Fire: Scottish
- Ambulance: Scottish

Browhouses is a settlement in Dumfries and Galloway, Scotland.

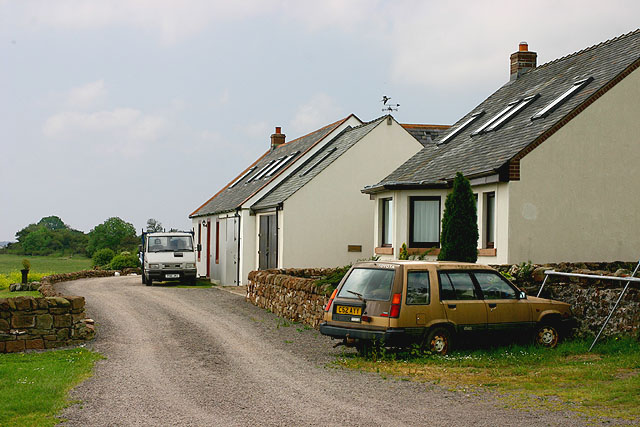
Houses at Browhouses

Browhouses is located near Gretna in Southern Scotland. This small settlement was the home of the Coulthard Family for almost 200 years.
