= Brothybeck =

Village in Cumbria, England

Coordinates: 54.77°N 03.02°W

- Location in Allerdale, Cumbria Location within Cumbria
- OS grid reference: NY3443
- Civil parish: Sebergham
- Unitary authority: Cumberland
- Ceremonial county: Cumbria
- Region: North West
- Country: England
- Sovereign state: United Kingdom
- Post town: CARLISLE
- Postcode district: CA5
- Dialling code: 01697
- Police: Cumbria
- Fire: Cumbria
- Ambulance: North West
- UK Parliament: Penrith and Solway

Brothybeck is a village in Cumbria, England.
