= Broomridge =

Coordinates: 56.09°N 03.93°W

Broomridge: Scottish Gaelic: Druim a' Bhealaidh; Scots: Broomrigg
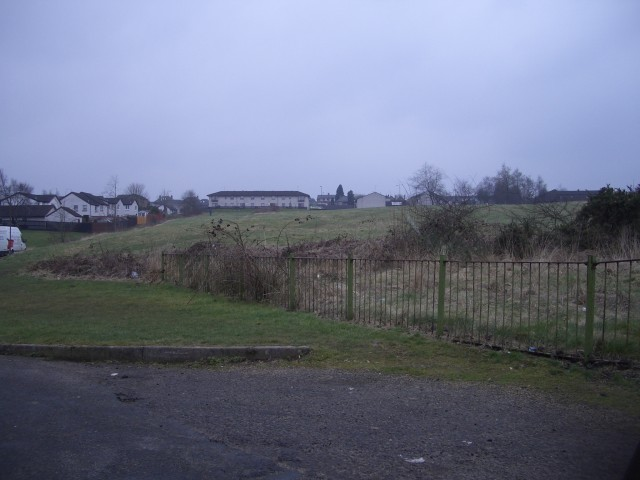
- Broomridge

- Location within the Stirling council area
- OS grid reference: NS8091
- Council area: Stirling
- Country: Scotland
- Sovereign state: United Kingdom
- Police: Scotland
- Fire: Scottish
- Ambulance: Scottish
- UK Parliament: Stirling and Strathallan
- Scottish Parliament: Stirling

Broomridge is a district in the south of the city of Stirling, Scotland, located north of Bannockburn and east of St. Ninians. It is home to Bannockburn High School and is also served by Braehead Primary School in the neighbouring district of Braehead.

The area, formerly a village outside of the city, has expanded due to the ongoing construction of new private housing between the 1960s and 1990s and is now within the city limits. The vast majority of Broomridge is taken up by housing, and the area is typical of newly built housing in the outskirts of towns and cities in Scotland. A small woodland patch close to Bannockburn High School called the Balquiderrock Woods (known locally as the Bluebell Woods due to its growth of such flowers in the spring season) remains as it is protected under legislation considering it a wildlife reserve.
