= Broubster =

Coordinates: 58.51°N 03.66°W

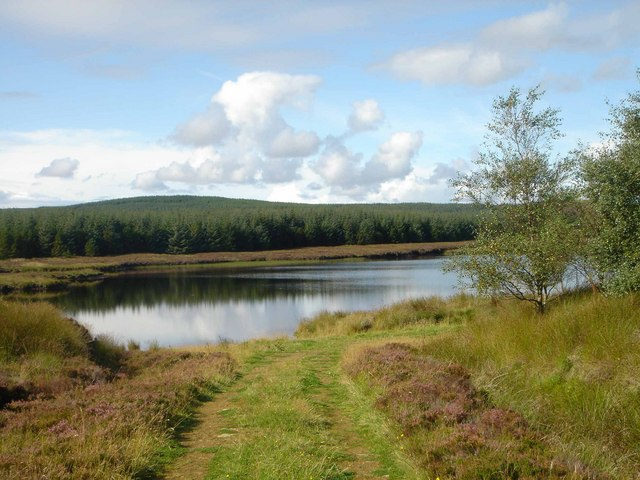
- Loch Saorach next to Broubster.

- Location within the Caithness area
- OS grid reference: ND0338159177
- Council area: Highland
- Country: Scotland
- Sovereign state: United Kingdom
- Police: Scotland
- Fire: Scottish
- Ambulance: Scottish

Broubster is a village in Highland, Scotland. Near Broubster, there is a Bronze Age megalithic arrangement. Ten stones remain of an original set of approximately 36. The arrangement is similar to a larger arrangement at Achavanich.

== Geography ==
Broubster lies on the Forss Water, 6 miles south of Lybster farm on the A836. Loch Calder is located about 1 miles to the west. An older settlement that is now ruined lies to the south of Broubster, that included several hut circles. This was the former planned village, which was established in the late 19th century to re-house some of the tenants evicted from the Broubster and Shurrery estates. Four rows of buildings are still clearly visible, one still partly roofed with turf. The last inhabitants left in the 1950s.

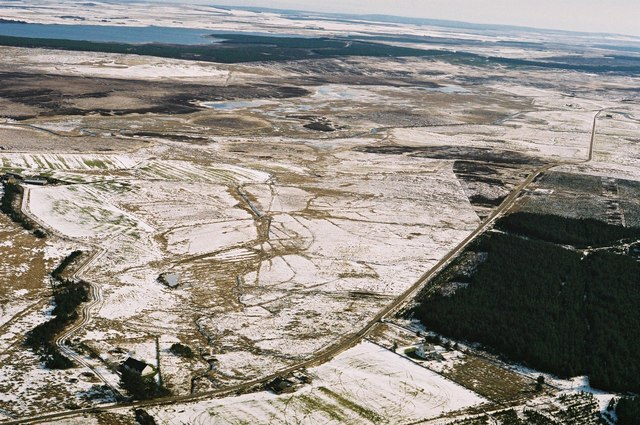
Broubster Leans overlooking Broubster Cottage with Broubster Leans to the south-east and Loch Calder in the distance.

To the east of Broubster lies a marsh called the Broubster Leans or Leans of Achaeter. This is a transition mire which has developed on a floodplain on the River Forss. The Leans support a diversity of plant communities from open water to Carr, rush pasture, blanket bog and quaking bog considered to be one of the best of its kind in the United Kingdom.
