= Brook, Isle of Wight =

Village on the Isle of Wight, England

Coordinates: 50.65247°N 1.45135°W

Brook
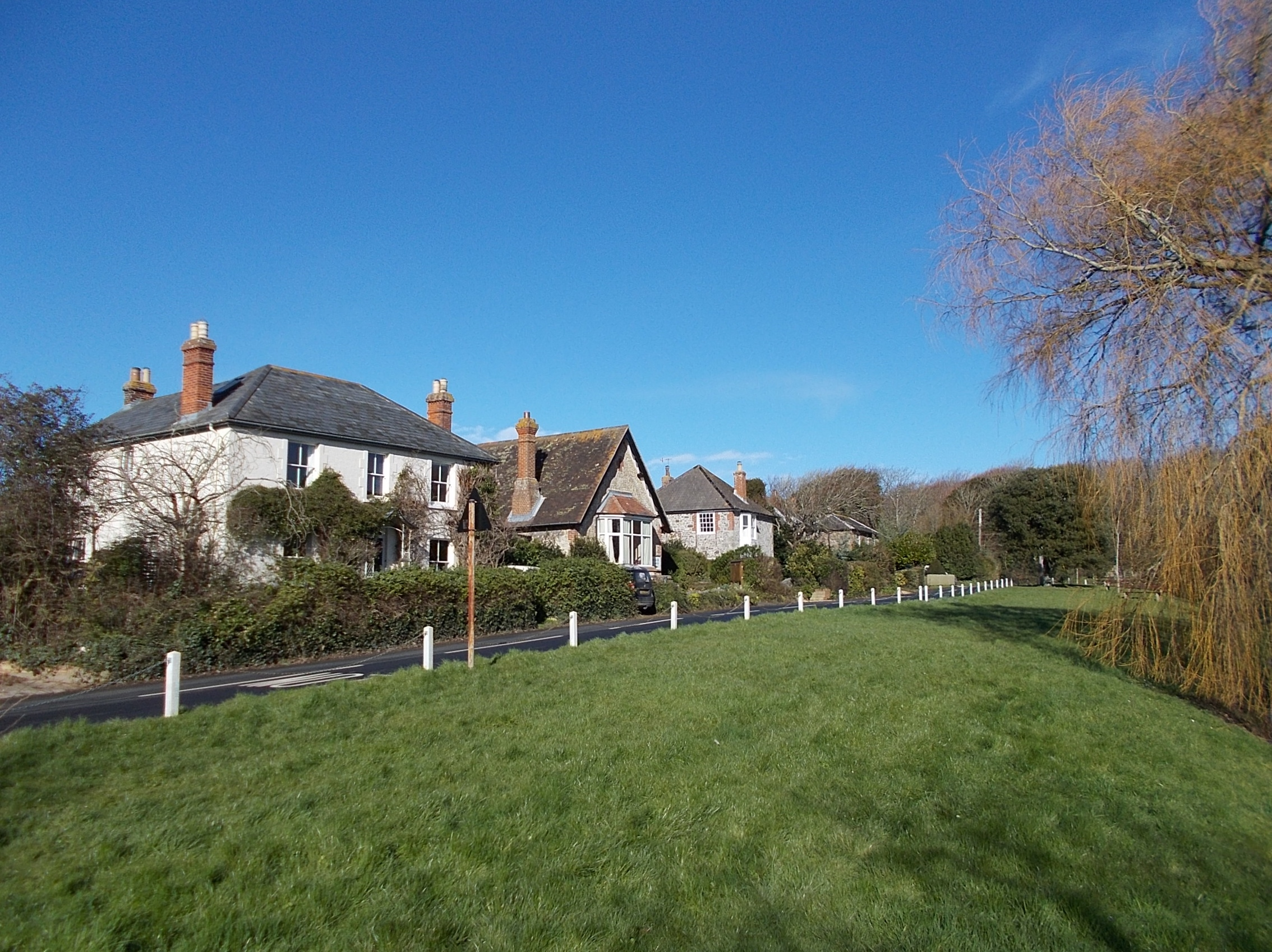

- Location within the Isle of Wight
- OS grid reference: SZ388837
- Civil parish: Brighstone
- Unitary authority: Isle of Wight
- Ceremonial county: Isle of Wight
- Region: South East
- Country: England
- Sovereign state: United Kingdom
- Post town: NEWPORT
- Postcode district: PO30
- Dialling code: 01983
- Police: Hampshire and Isle of Wight
- Fire: Hampshire and Isle of Wight
- Ambulance: Isle of Wight
- UK Parliament: Isle of Wight West

Brook is a village and former civil parish, now in the parish of Brighstone, on the Isle of Wight, England. In 1931 the parish had a population of 156. On 1 April 1933 the parish was abolished and merged with Brighstone.

== Name ==
Its name is thought to mean '(the place at) the brook', from Old English brōc. Brook Chine is named after Brook.

1086: Broc

~1194: Manerio del Broc

~1200: Broke

1276: La Broke

1327: Brouke

1348: Brooke

In the spelling dated ~1194, del means 'of the'.

== Background ==
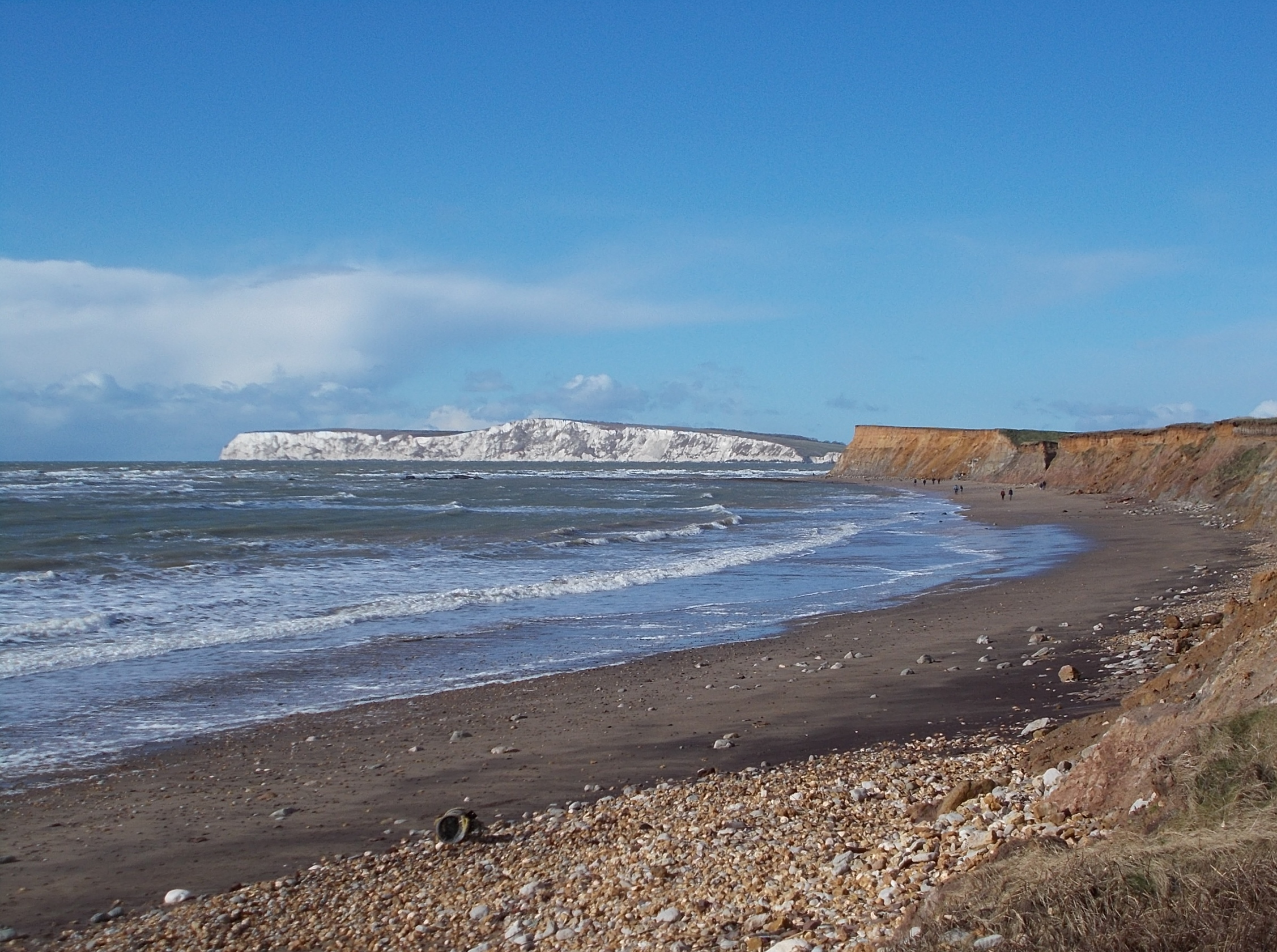
The beach at Brook, with fine views towards Tennyson Down (chalk cliffs in distance)

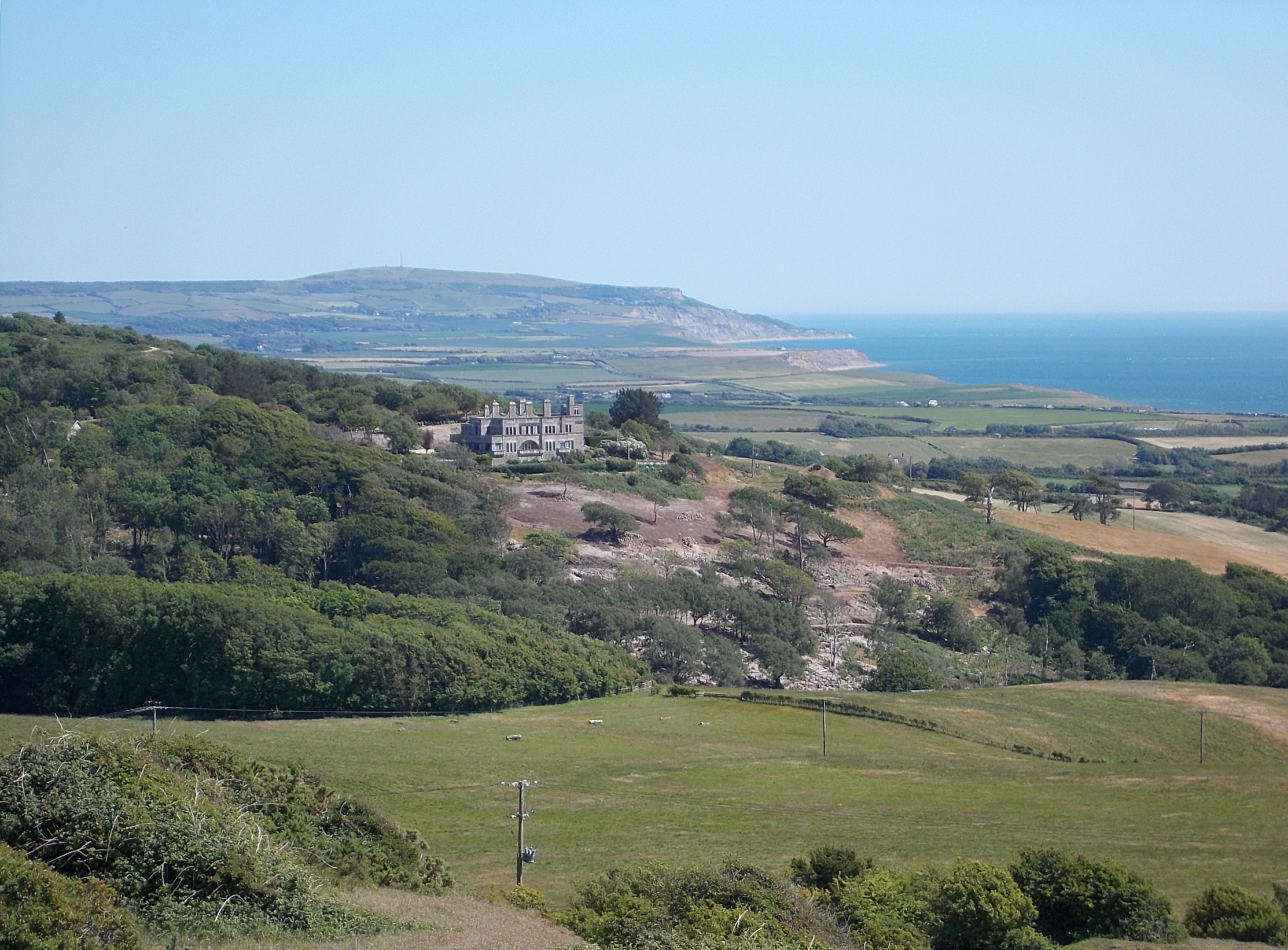
View of Brook Hill House from Brook Down

Brook is situated on the south west coast of the Island between Brighstone and Freshwater, and borders a section of rugged coastline, the Back of the Wight, facing into the English Channel and towards the famous Needles and west Wight cliffs.

Brook's principal public attraction is its proximity to a section of coast which is used by the public for walking, fossil hunting, kitesurfing and windsurfing. There is a small 'green' by the beach and a National Trust-owned section of land with a small car park, the nearby hamlet of Brookgreen is also owned by them. There are no toilets, no cafe and no souvenir shops. A chine leads down to Brook Bay, which is a semi-circular sweep of semi-rocky beach facing south west. The prevailing south-westerly winds scour the beach and alternately either pile up sand from the Dorset coast, or strip it bare, exposing rocks and sometimes fossils.

There is a section of reef extending from the shoreline for about half a mile into the English Channel. The hinterland of Brook rises steeply from the coastal road to join the chalk spine which stretches from one end of the Island to the other.

== Church ==
St. Mary's Church, Brook is perched on a small hillock at the top of the village. It was rebuilt in 1864 following a disastrous fire on 16 December 1863 [this date quoted from W.H. Davenport Adams, 1873, although Lloyd and Pevsner, 2006, says 1862]. The oldest surviving part of the church probably dates from the 13th century.

== Transport ==
It is linked to other parts of the Island by Southern Vectis bus route 12, serving Freshwater, Totland and Newport as well as intermediate villages. The Island Coaster bus also serves the south side of Brook on its journey between Ryde, Sandown Bay, Alum Bay and Yarmouth.
