= Brookgreen =

Coordinates: 50°38′49″N 1°26′41″W

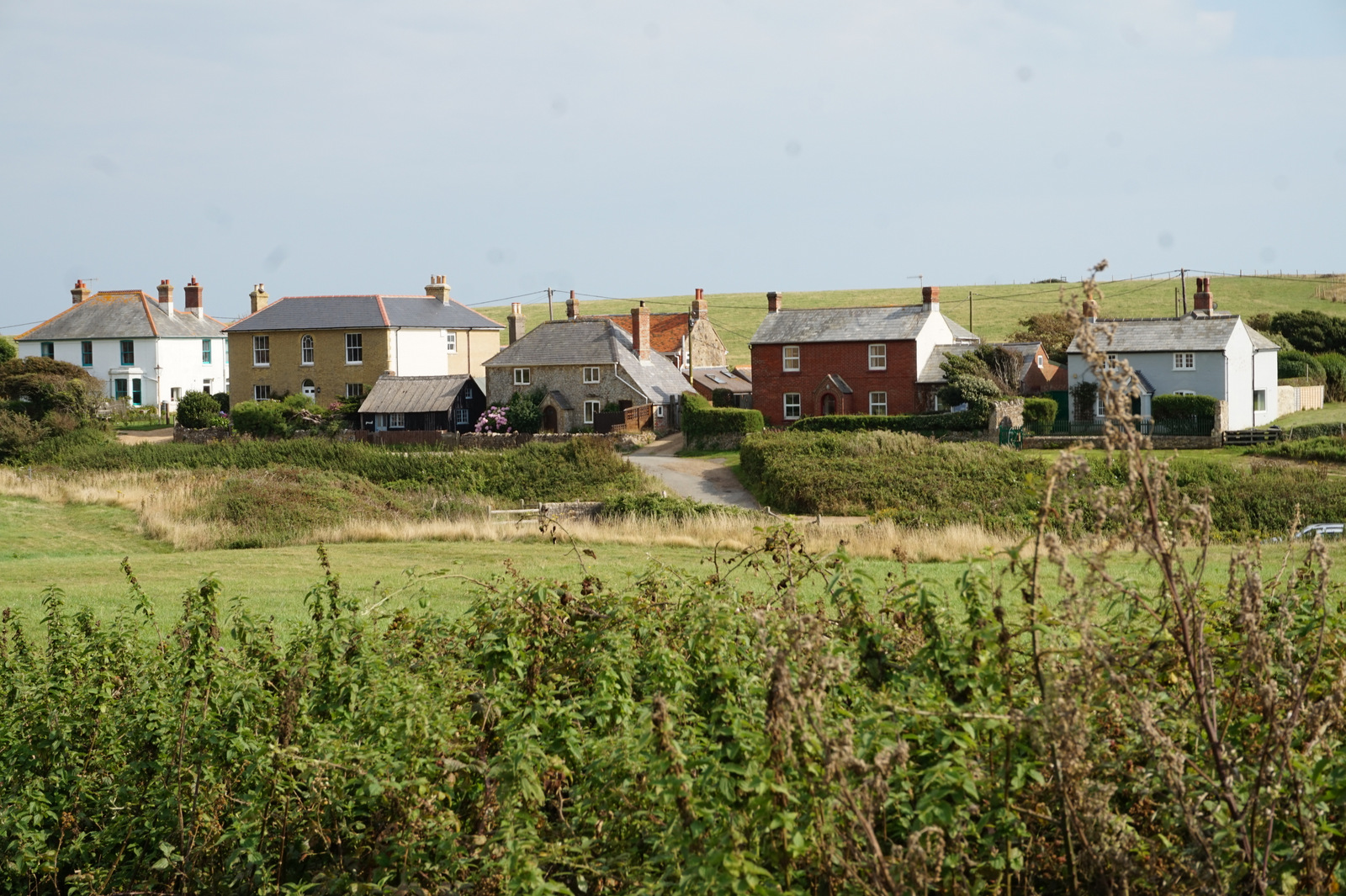
Houses at Brookgreen

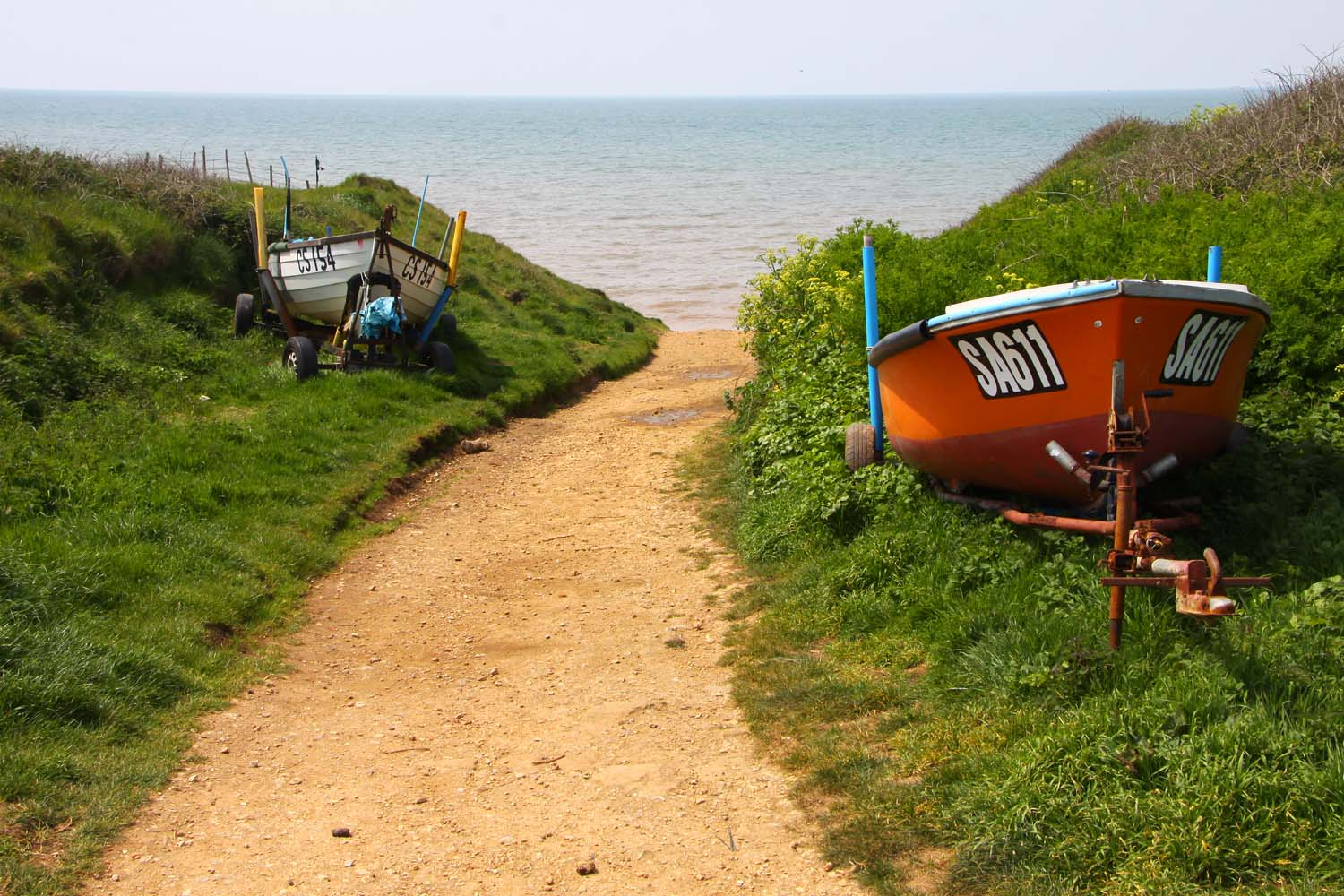
Beach at Brookgreen

Brookgreen (also spelled Brook Green) is a small hamlet on the Isle of Wight located near Brook on the Back of the Wight (also known as West Wight). It is owned by the National Trust. Brook Chine is located there, named after the larger village of Brook. The hamlet is named after Brook.
