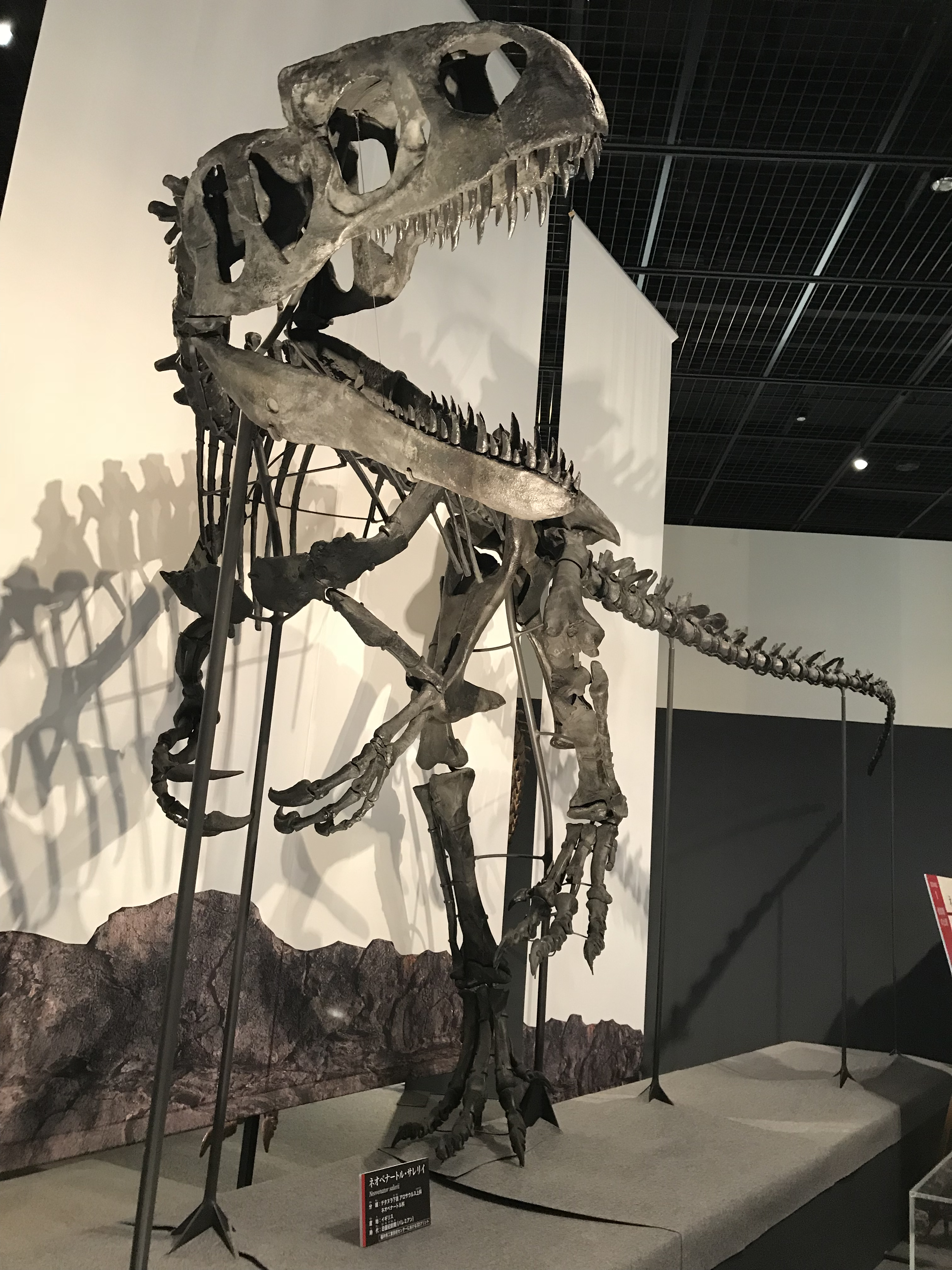
- Reconstructed skeleton in Japan

Scientific classification
- Kingdom: Animalia
- Phylum: Chordata
- Class: Reptilia
- Clade: Dinosauria
- Clade: Saurischia
- Clade: Theropoda
- Clade: †Allosauria
- Clade: †Carcharodontosauria
- Family: †Neovenatoridae
- Genus: †Neovenator; Hutt, Martill & Barker, 1996
- Species: †N. salerii

Binomial name
- †Neovenator salerii Hutt, Martill & Barker, 1996

= Neovenator =

Neovenator Temporal range: Hauterivian–Barremian Possible Berriasian records

Extinct genus of dinosaurs

Neovenator (nˈiːə͡ʊvˌɛne͡ɪtə; "new hunter") is an extinct genus of carcharodontosaurian theropod dinosaur. It is known primarily from several skeletons found in the Early Cretaceous (Hauterivian–Barremian) Wessex Formation on the south coast of the Isle of Wight, southern England. The first remains of Neovenator were discovered in 1978 alongside those of the ornithopod Brighstoneus, after the collapse of part of Grange Chine. In 1996, Steve Hutt, David Martill and Michael Barker named the genus Neovenator. One species is known: the type species, N. salerii, after the Salero family who owned the site on which its remains were discovered.

Between the type specimen and multiple referred specimens, roughly seventy per cent of Neovenator's skeleton is known. While incompletely known, it was likely around 7 metres (23 ft) in length and probably weighed 1 metric ton (1.1 short tons), though a specimen possibly referable to the genus indicates a larger body size of 10 metres (33 ft). Its skull is known from both premaxillae, parts of the left maxilla, right nasal, right palatine, and the front portion of a dentary. The snout of Neovenator is covered in rugosities, similar to carcharodontosaurids and abelisaurids, which indicates that it either had an extensive blood supply, possibly for thermoregulation, or an extensive neurovascular system, possibly for tactile purposes. However, this hypothesis has seen scrutiny. Teeth found in association with the type specimen of Neovenator, while they do possess the characteristic enamel wrinkles of carcharodontosaur teeth, differ in their precise pattern.

The taxonomic position of Neovenator has been a subject of debate. Prior to its description, its fragmentary remains led to a tentative referral to Megalosaurus. The authors who described the genus suggested that it was a British representative of Allosauridae, or at least closely related to Allosaurus. A position within the related clade Carcharodontosauria was first suggested in 1998, and subsequently saw support using both comparative morphology and phylogenetic analyses. In 2010, it was assigned to a family of its own, Neovenatoridae.

Neovenator is best known from the Wessex Formation of the Isle of Wight, although teeth possibly referrable to the genus have been recovered from the Angeac-Charente bone bed in France. Bite marks found on a fossil of the iguanodontid Mantellisaurus suggest that it was among Neovenator's prey base. Like many fossils of the closely related Allosaurus, the type specimen of Neovenator bears numerous pathologies.

== Discovery and species ==
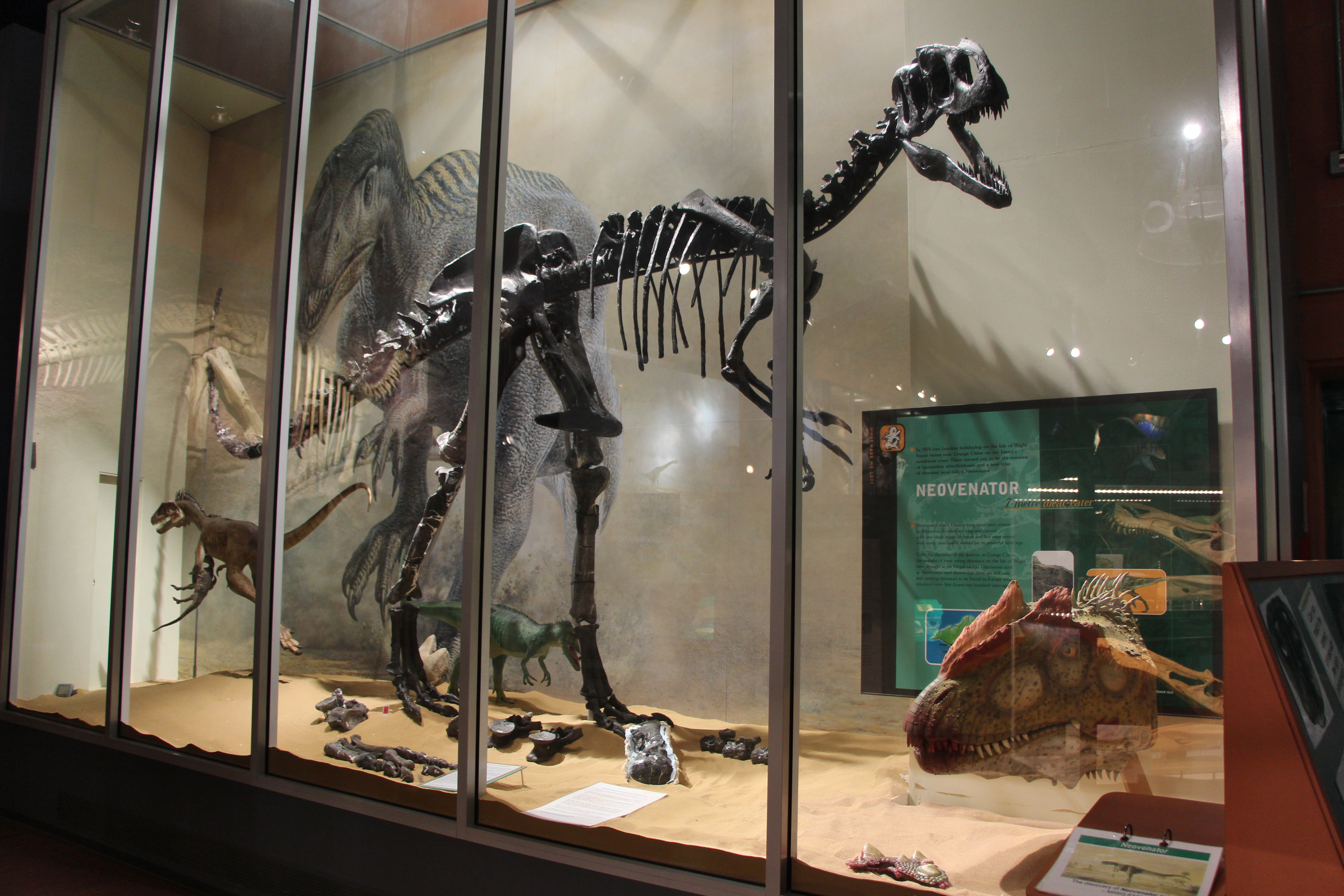
Mounted skeleton and fossils, Dinosaur Isle

The first bones of Neovenator were discovered in the summer of 1978 when a storm made part of the Grange Chine collapse. Rocks containing fossils fell to the beach of Brighstone Bay on the southwestern coast of the Isle of Wight. The rocks consisted of plant debris bed L9 within the variegated clays and marls of the Wessex Formation, dating from the Barremian stage of the Early Cretaceous, about 125 million years ago. They were first collected by the Henwood family and shortly afterwards geology student David Richards collected additional material. Richards sent the remains to the Museum of Isle of Wight (now Dinosaur Isle) and the British Museum of Natural History. In the latter institution, palaeontologist Alan Jack Charig determined that the bones belonged to two kinds of animal: Iguanodon and a theropod. The "Iguanodon", later referred to Mantellisaurus and ultimately made the separate genus Brighstoneus, generated the most interest and in the early 1980s a team was sent by the BMNH to secure more material. The theropod material, meanwhile, was fairly incomplete (consisting of vertebrae and fragments of the pelvis), and a lack of diagnostic features meant that it was ignored until its significance was recognised by Dr. William Blows.

Several amateur paleontologists, among them Keith and Jenny Simmonds, now began to search for additional remains of the predator. Ultimately, the total of secured bones included the snout, teeth, the front of a mandible (lower jaw), most of the vertebral column, ribs, gastralia (belly ribs), chevrons, the left shoulder girdle, pelvic bones and a hindlimb. These were accessioned under numbers BMNH R10001 and MIWG 6348. From 1997–2001, further elements were recovered, in the form of the first caudal (tail) vertebra, a left femur, a right tibia, and a pedal phalanx (toe bone). In all, the bones recovered equalled approximately 70% of the skeleton. In 1985, excavations undertaken by Steve Hutt of the MIWG revealed two vertebrae of a second individual, specimen MIWG.5470, recovered 500 m (1,600 ft) from the first. In 1987, Jenny Simmonds found a third skeleton, containing vertebra and pelvic bones, specimen MIWG.6352; this specimen was originally believed to be a different taxon. A fourth individual found by Nick Oliver is represented by specimen IWCMS 2002.186, consisting of a lower jaw, parts of the cervical (neck) vertebrae and limb elements. In 1990 the material, then considered a possible new species of Megalosaurus, was provisionally described by Hutt. Having mistaken the ischium of MIWG 6352 for a pubic bone, Hutt suggested this specimen represented a separate species.

In 1996, Steve Hutt, David Martill and Michael Barker named and described the type species Neovenator salerii. The generic name Neovenator means "new hunter" from the Greek neo~, "new" and Latin venator, "hunter". The specific name salerii honours the land owners of the site, the Salero family. In view of the large number of individuals involved in the discovery process, it was considered improper to single out one of them as discoverer. The holotype is the skeleton accessioned as BMNH R10001 and MIWG 6348.

In 1999, Hutt dedicated his (unpublished) master thesis to Neovenator. This thesis would form the foundation for a monograph discussing the osteology of the genus. That monograph was published in 2008, and was authored by Stephen L. Brusatte, Roger B. J. Benson and Hutt by the Palaeontographical Society.

In 2012, teeth indistinguishable from those associated with the holotype of Neovenator were found in the Angeac-Charente bone bed, in France, dating to the Berriasian. They were distinguished from those of Erectopus, a basal allosauroid also known from the Early Cretaceous of France, by differences in the carinae of their teeth.

== Description ==
=== Size ===
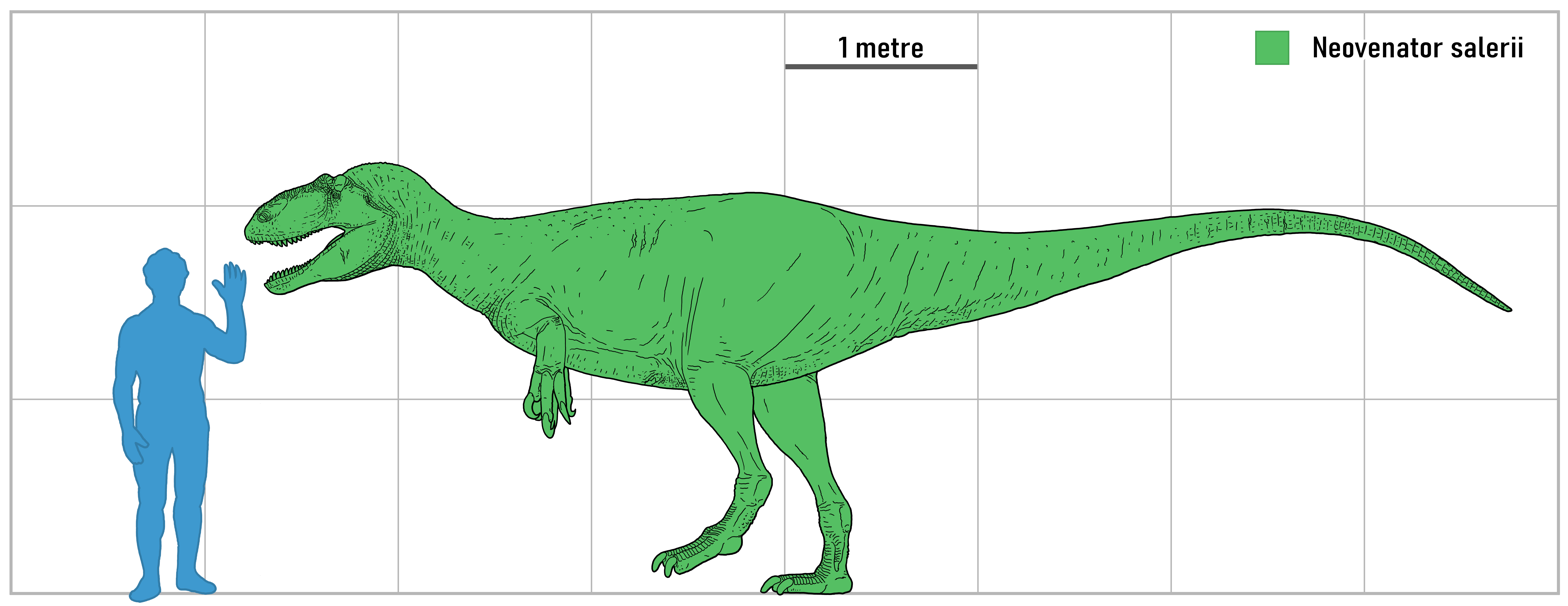
Estimated size based on the holotype

Neovenator was a mid-sized, lightly built carcharodontosaurid. The holotype specimen measured approximately 7–7.5 metres (23–25 ft) in length, and was fairly lightly built. A hip height of about 2 metres (6 ft 7 in) has been suggested. Gregory S. Paul estimated its mass at around 1 t (1.1 short tons). It has been suggested that the holotype may be a subadult, and if this is the case, this may not be reflective of the maximum body size of the genus. However, in 2016, Jeremy Lockwood noted that most of the elements referred to Neovenator are roughly the same size as the holotype, suggesting that adults would have had a similar body size. Specimen MIWG 4199 indicates an individual with a possible length of about 10 metres (33 ft), though it consists only of a pedal phalanx and its position in Neovenator is dubious. A footprint (IWCMS:2016.273) is believed to have been left by an animal with a hip height of 2.5 metres (8 ft 2 in), and while the trackmaker is uncertain, it has been suggested that it was left by a mature Neovenator.

=== Skull and dentition ===
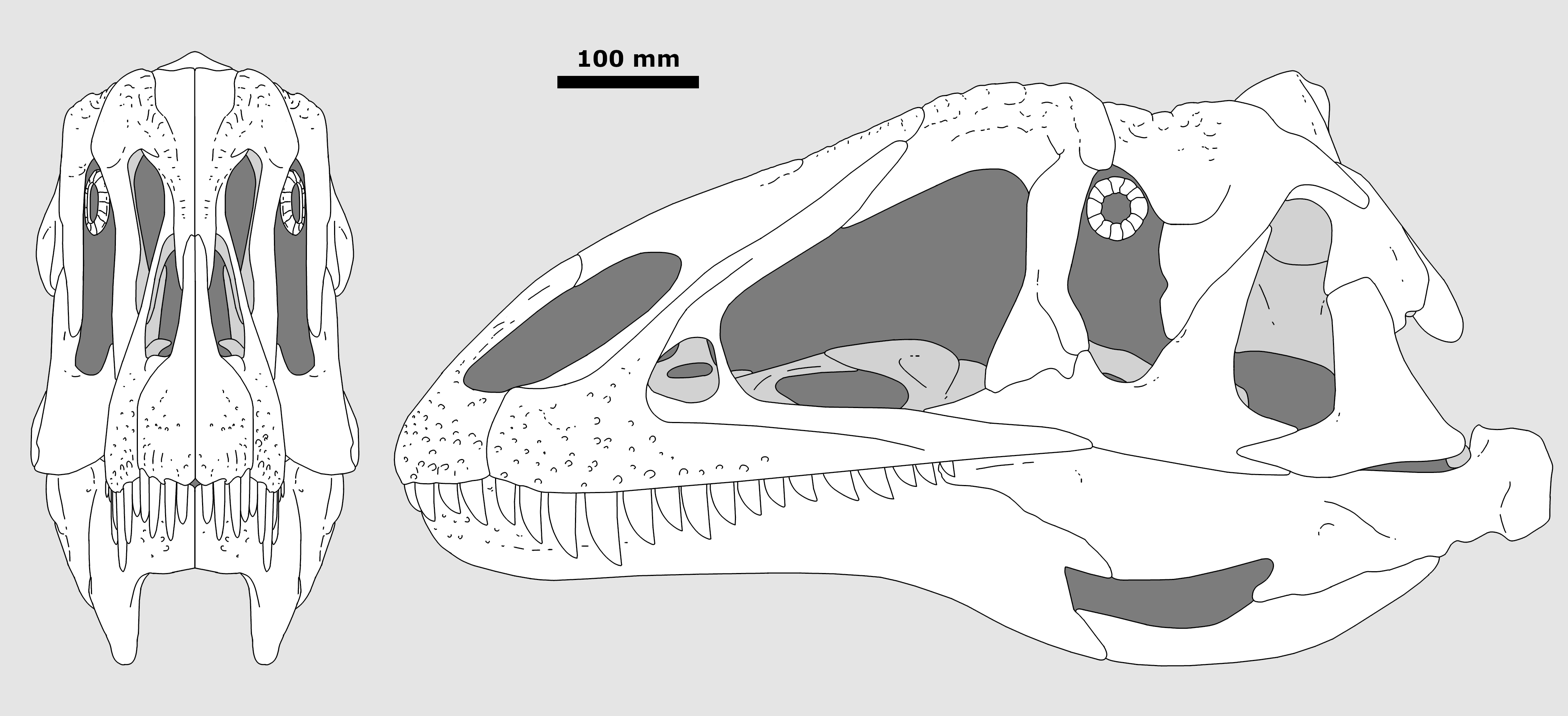
Reconstructed skull in anterior (left) and left lateral (right) views

The skull of Neovenator is not known in its entirety, but is instead represented by both premaxillae (both complete), a left maxilla, a right nasal, a right palatine, and the anterior (front) portion of a left dentary, part of the mandible. The length of the skull is 70 centimetres (2.3 ft). The premaxillae were longer than they were tall, measuring 8.7 cm (3.4 in) in length and 7 cm (2.8 in) in height. This condition is seen in several non-carcharodontosaurid taxa (i.e. Allosaurus and Sinraptor), but not in other, more derived carcharodontosaurs, such as Acrocanthosaurus. The premaxillae have an additional connection (referred to in 2001 as a "pen-in-socket connection"), by not seen in other theropods. The left maxilla, as preserved, measures around 30 cm (12 in) in length, and 7.5 cm (3.0 in) in depth. Only a small portion near where the jugal connected is missing. As in many basal tetanurans (and the more derived Carcharodontosaurus), the maxilla contributed to the posterior (rear) border of the external naris (nasal opening). Similar to abelisaurids and other allosauroids (i.e. Giganotosaurus, Mapusaurus and Sinraptor), the surface of the maxilla bore prominent rugosities, and contains a high density of foramina, particularly at its anteriormost (very front) portion, ventral to (below) the external naris. It has been suggested that Neovenator's snout was highly vascularised or innervated. Unlike many other allosauroids and ceratosaurs, the ascending ramus lacked pneumatic excavation (hollow spaces containing air pockets). A large maxillary fenestra, with a diameter roughly one-sixth of the length of the tooth row, penetrated the maxilla. Similar to the maxilla, Neovenator's nasal was rugose, though the extent of its rugosity is slightly weaker than in Carcharodontosaurus. The dorsal (upper) and lateral (side) surfaces of the nasal were separated by a rugose ridge. While initially regarded as a diagnostic feature of Neovenator, the same is also known in Allosaurus. As evidenced by the presence of a single large pneumatopore, the nasal was likely hollow and highly pneumatised. Similar conditions are observed in other allosauroids, though the amount of pneumatopores varied, sometimes within the same genus. Posteriorly, the dorsal portion of the nasals would have contributed to a crest similar to that of Allosaurus, though this crest differed in that it showed no lateral overhang.

The holotype of Neovenator preserved a near-complete left dentary, measuring 23.5 cm (9.3 in) in length and 6.8 cm (2.7 in), though it was lost at the time of the 2008 monograph's publication. What was written in that monograph was therefore based on figures in published works and examinations of a cast. Unlike some other carcharodontosaurs (particularly later genera such as Carcharodontosaurus and Giganotosaurus), the anterior (front) tip of the dentary was not squared-off. It was instead rounded, as in most other theropods. Unlike the maxilla and nasal, the dentary of Neovenator was fairly smooth, lacking rugosities, unlike what is seen in taxa like Carcharodontosaurus. The largest foramina present were directly ventral to the alveolar margin (the tooth row), set in a longitudinal groove which deflected ventrally at around the fifth alveolus. The third alveolus of the dentary was enlarged, which is unique among allosauroids, save for Acrocanthosaurus. When viewed from above, the alveoli on both upper and lower jaws were arranged in a weakly sinuous curve, though this may be the result of taphonomy.

As preserved, Neovenator's premaxilla has five alveoli (tooth sockets), as in Allosaurus; its maxilla bears fifteen, though at least one or two more are likely to have been present. No teeth are preserved in the premaxilla or maxilla, and no erupted teeth are known from the dentary, though four replacement teeth are preserved. Additionally, isolated theropod teeth were found around the holotype specimen, tentatively assigned to the genus. Based on these, Neovenator's teeth were fairly typical for theropod teeth, though differ from those of other carcharodontosaurs in details of the enamel wrinkles. The teeth were asymmetrical in cross-section, due to the orientation of the distal carina.

=== Vertebral column ===
The majority of Neovenator's vertebral column is known from the holotype. Six cervical (neck) vertebrae, including the axis (the second cervical vertebra positionally), are known, as are twelve dorsal (back) vertebrae. Also known are twenty-three caudal (tail) vertebrae. The front joint surface of the intercentrum of the axis was widened transversely. The odontoid process of the axis had small openings along the side edge of the front facet, and the neural process of the axis had a single small opening in the side. The more rearward cervical vertebrae were fused with their cervical ribs; while this is known in many other theropod clades, Neovenator is the only allosauroid in which this was the case. The neural spines of the cervical vertebrae were narrow anteroposteriorly (from front-to-back), are thick transversely, and were overall rod-like in shape. The seventh was inclined posteriorly, the eighth anteriorly, and the ninth directly vertically.

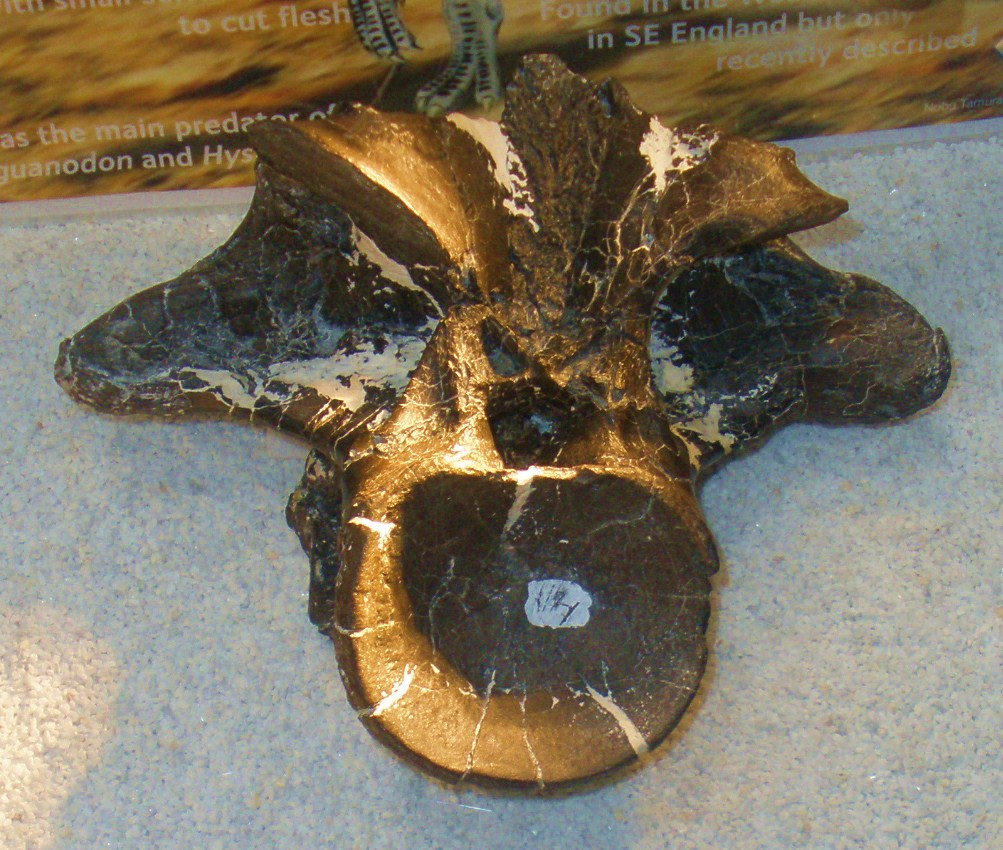
First dorsal vertebra

The first two dorsal vertebrae were morphologically intermediate between the cervical and dorsal vertebrae, being, among other things, short anteroposteriorly when compared to dorsal vertebrae further along the column. The remaining dorsal vertebrae were fairly homogenous in morphology, characterised by their tall centra and biconcave articular surfaces. Each dorsal vertebra had transverse processes which are broad anteroposteriorly yet thin dorsoventrally (up-and-down). Their neural spines are subrectangular in lateral view and are thick transversely, at least in comparison to most non-allosauroid tetanurans. Two large fragments of the dorsal ribs are known, one better-preserved and coming from the left side of the torso, and the other coming from the right side. Some disarticulated gastralia (constituent bones of the gastral basket, which supported the organs and aided in respiration) are known. Sacral vertebrae are known from referred specimens. The second and third sacral vertebrae were fused, unlike Acrocanthosaurus and Sinraptor, but like some specimens of Allosaurus. The second and fourth sacrals are known exclusively from their centra, so the neural arches of the sacra are poorly known.

The first caudal vertebra of the holotype is poorly preserved due to damage sustained during the cliff fall, thus leaving the second as the best preserved. Though most of the anterior and middle caudal vertebrae are damaged, the distal ones are fairly complete. The anterior caudal centra had suboval articular surfaces, and posterior surfaces smaller than the anterior surface, and this pattern continues until the vertebra tentatively identified as the twenty-second.

=== Appendicular skeleton ===
The left scapula and coracoid of Neovenator's holotype are nearly complete, though its forelimbs are not known. Around two-thirds of the glenoid fossa's length is taken up by the scapula. While well-preserved, the coracoid is damaged enough that most of the point where it articulated with the scapula is absent. The shoulder joint is wider transversely than anteroposteriorly. On the medial surface of the scapulocoracoid, the glenoid is buttressed by a slight ridge, which fans out posteriorly to unite with the ventral margin of the scapular blade.

The ilia of Neovenator, including referred elements, are fragmentary. Ventral to the ilium's front blade is a notch, which has a robust shelf on the inner side. The ilium overall is highly pneumatised. While a right pubis is preserved, it is fragmentary, heavily abraded and badly crushed. Distally, it expands into a large pubic boot, similar to that of other carcharodontosaurs and tyrannosaurids. The "feet" of the ischia are connected anteriorly but diverge posteriorly; the ischiac feet were expanded, another trait observed in other carcharodontosaurs. Like in other carcharodontosaurs, and in some tyrannosaurids, Neovenator's femoral head is angled dorsomedially (upwards and towards the centrum). The lesser trochanter of the femur has a robust ridge on its outer side, and is itself extremely robust. The fourth trochanter has a depression in the form of a thumbprint located laterally on its dorsal border. The distal portion of the tibia shows an oval rough area at the inner side. The top of the outer malleolus of the tibia is pinched from the front to the rear. The outer front bulge of the top surface of the tibia has a spur deflected ventrally. In the foot, the outer side of the second metatarsal has a hollow surface to contact the third metatarsal.

== Classification ==
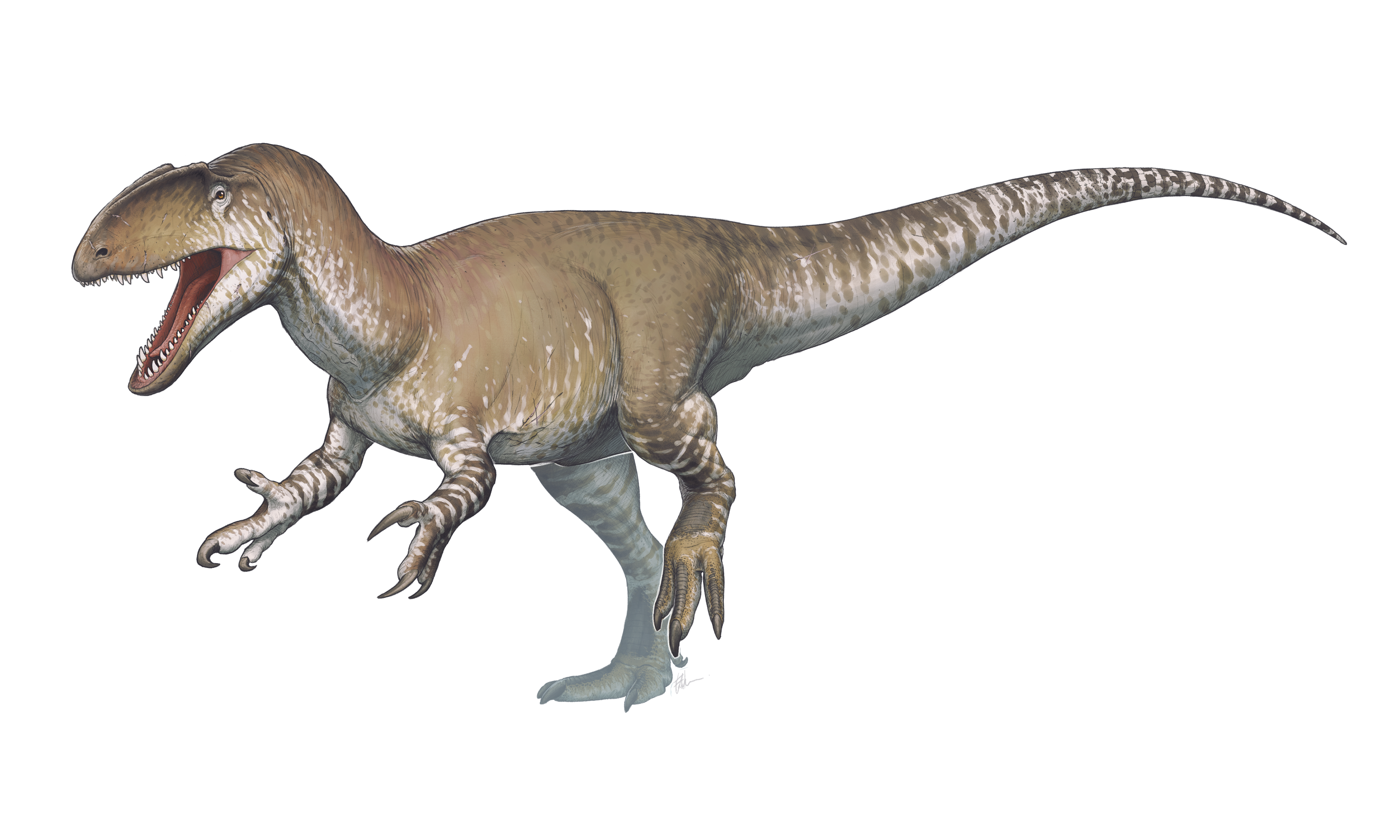
Restoration

In the 1996 paper describing Neovenator, Hutt, Martill and Barker suggested a close relationship with Allosaurus, and that Neovenator might itself have been a member of Allosauridae. The findings of that paper were based on morphological comparisons, rather than phylogenetic analysis. The first analysis to include Neovenator was published in 2000 by Thomas R. Holtz Jr., and indeed recovered as the sister taxon to Allosaurus. However, that topology was the result of incorrect scoring, and two of the characters used to unite the two genera (prezygapophysis morphology and the distal expansion of the scapula) are respectively erroneous and uncorrelated with phylogeny. The idea of Neovenator being a "proto-carcharodontosaurid" was first put forward by Jerald D. Harris in 1998, and was supported by Darren Naish, Steve Hutt, and David Martill in 2001, based on the presence an inflated "boot" to each ischium and of pleurocoels (pneumatic hollows) throughout the vertebrae, both classically carcharodontosaurian traits.

In a 2008 phylogenetic analysis of Allosauroidea, which slightly predated the Neovenator monograph, Steve Brusatte and Paul Sereno recovered Neovenator as the most basal member of Carcharodontosauridae. In 2010, Brusatte, along with Roger B. J. Benson and Matt Carrano, recovered Neovenator in a similar position. However, their database included megaraptorans, which were recovered in a clade with Neovenator. Therefore, Benson, Carrano and Brusatte erected the family Neovenatoridae, to encompass both taxa.

The cladogram below follows the 2010 analysis by Benson, Carrano and Brusatte.

- Neovenatoridae
  - Neovenator
  - unnamed
    - Chilantaisaurus
    - Megaraptora
      - unnamed
        - Australovenator
        - Fukuiraptor
      - Orkoraptor?
      - - Aerosteon
        - Megaraptor

In the years since that paper, however, an increasing number of phylogenies have recovered megaraptorans in Coelurosauria, as opposed to being sisters to Neovenator. If this is the case, Neovenatoridae is likely monotypic. Fernano Novas et al. (2013) recovered Neovenator at the base of Carcharodontosauridae, in a polytomy with Eocarcharia and Concavenator.

Cladogram after Novas et al., 2013

- - Allosaurus
  - Carcharodontosauridae
    - Neovenator
    - Eocarcharia
    - Concavenator
    - - Acrocanthosaurus
      - - Shaochilong
        - Carcharodontosaurinae
          - Carcharodontosaurus
          - Giganotosaurini
            - Tyrannotitan
            - - Mapusaurus
              - Giganotosaurus

== Palaeobiology ==
=== Senses ===
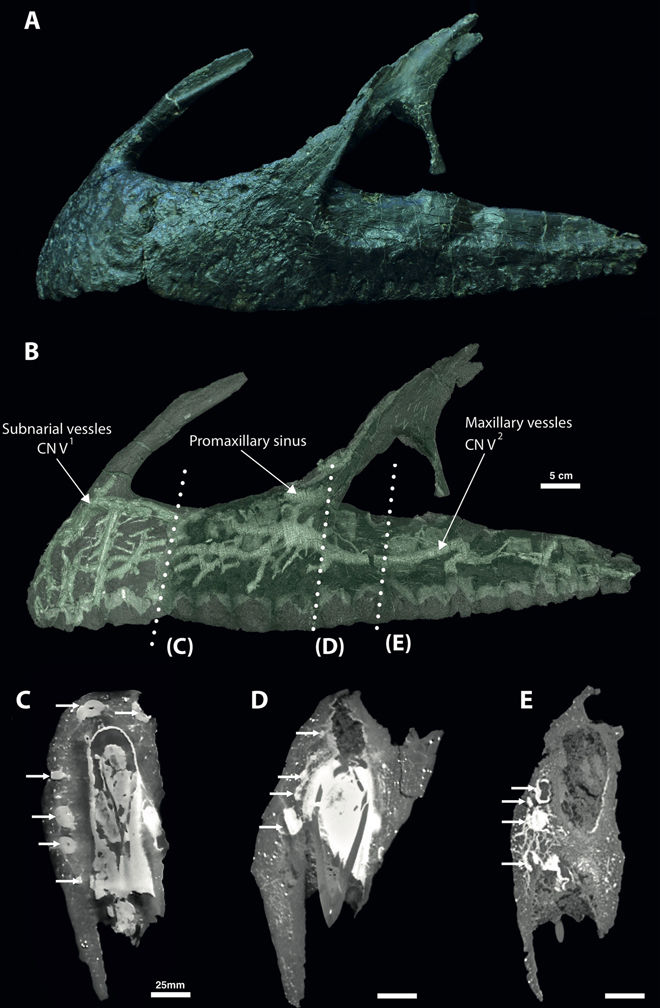
Praemaxilla and maxilla, with neurovascular network and CT sections

Chris Barker and colleagues suggested that Neovenator may have possessed integumentary sensory organs on its snout, much as modern waterfowl and crocodilians use to find food in muddy water, based on neurovascular structures found on the skull. As Neovenator is believed to be completely terrestrial, unlike the modern species, it is assumed that these sensory organs were used for other purposes, such as sensitivity to pressure and temperature, controlling jaw pressure and precision feeding. In support of this, the tooth wear for Neovenator seems to indicate that it avoided eating or biting into bone while it fed. Additionally, Neovenator might have used these integumentary sensory organs in courtship and sensing nest conditions, a technique seen today in most species of crocodilians and megapode birds. Though such structures are known for another theropod, the tyrannosaurid Daspletosaurus horneri, Neovenator's neurovascular structures that likely supported these organs are the best preserved and most complete in any known theropod yet discovered. However, a more recent study reviewing the evolution of the trigeminal canals among sauropsids notes that a much denser network of neurovascular canals in the snout and lower jaw is more commonly encountered in aquatic or semiaquatic taxa (e.g., Spinosaurus, Halszkaraptor, Plesiosaurus), and taxa that developed a rhamphotheca (e.g., Caenagnathasia), while terrestrial taxa such as tyrannosaurids and Neovenator may have had average facial sensitivity for non-edentulous terrestrial theropods, although further research is needed.

=== Palaeopathology ===
As with many specimens of Allosaurus, the holotype of Neovenator salerii was highly pathological. The pathologies listed in the 1996 paper and the 2008 monograph: are the fusion of two caudal vertebrae and their associated chevron into a single mass (also seen in certain Allosaurus and likely the result of neoplastic ankylosis); healed fractures to the gastralia; a fracture to the scapula; one gastralium which appears to exhibit regrowth across its entire length, and osteophytes on some of the pedal (foot) phalanges. One of the left pedal phalanges has been almost completely covered by exostotic bone growth and small lesions, suggesting osteomyelitis, similar to one specimen of Allosaurus.

== Palaeoecology ==
=== Palaeoenvironment ===
The only definite remains of Neovenator are known from the Barremian-age Wessex Formation of the Isle of Wight, though teeth identical to the genus are known from the Berriasian-age Angeac-Charente bone bed in France.

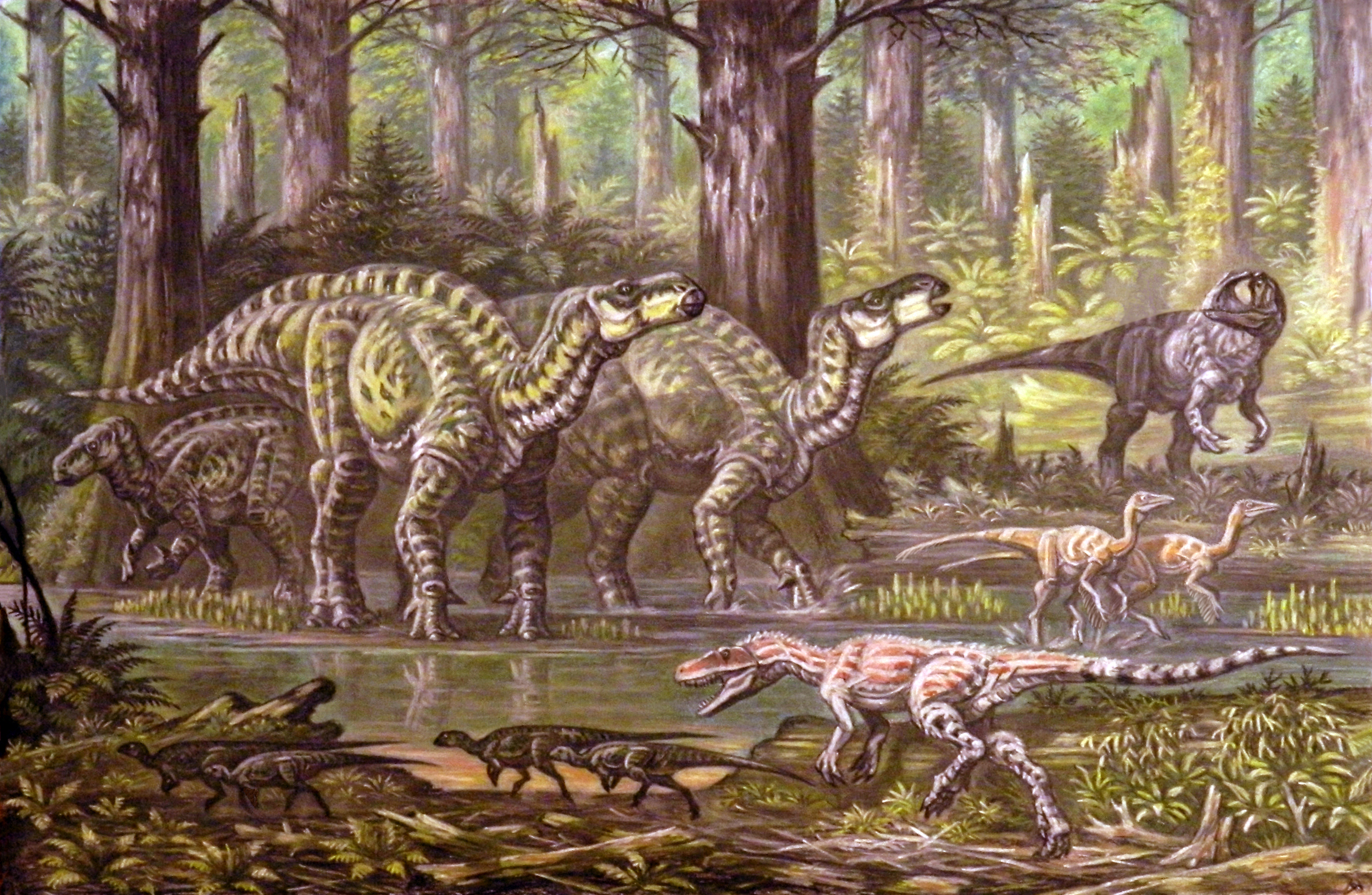
A selection of Wessex Formation dinosaurs. On the left is Iguanodon. In the foreground is a group of Hypsilophodon being pursued by an Eotyrannus. In the right background is a Neovenator. In the midground is a pair of basal ornithomimosaurs.

Sedimentological data suggests that the depositional environment of the Wessex Formation was a floodplain intersected by fluvial (river) and lacustrine (lake) deposits. Water levels likely varied throughout the year, due to there being more evaporation than precipitation, though precipitation was regardless quite high. The Wessex seems to have regularly experienced extreme storms and periodic flood events, resulting in debris flows which would have deposited dead organisms in ponds. Burned plant and insect material and fusain suggests that the environment experienced frequent wildfires, stifling for the most part the dense growth of gymnosperms. Much of the flora of the formed of low ground cover, consisting primarily of pteridophytes, with occasional stands of conifers, cycads and the tree fern Tempskya. Most vertebrate material from the Wessex Formation originates from plant debris beds, resulting from the aforementioned flooding events.

Aside from Neovenator, the dinosaur fauna of the Isle of Wight include the theropods Aristosuchus, Calamospondylus, Ceratosuchops, Eotyrannus, Invictibellatrix, Ornithodesmus, Riparovenator, and Thecocoelurus, the sauropods Chondrosteosaurus, Eucamerotus and Ornithopsis, the thyreophorans Polacanthus and Vectipelta, and the ornithopods Brighstoneus, Comptonatus, Hypsilophodon, Iguanodon, Mantellisaurus, Valdosaurus and Vectidromeus. The pterosaur fauna of the Wessex Formation consists of Coloborhynchus, Caulkicephalus, Istiodactylus, Vectidraco, and Wightia; multiple unnamed pterosaur taxa, including a ctenochasmatid, are also known. Neosuchian crocodyliforms include Bernissartia, Koumpiodontosuchus and Vectisuchus. Limited evidence exists of elasmosaurids and leptocleidid plesiosaurs. The mammal fauna of the Wessex Formation includes the multituberculate Eobataar and the spalacotheriid Yaverlestes. Albanerpetontid amphibians are represented by Wesserpeton. The fish fauna of the Wessex Formation, both bony and cartilaginous, is extensive, including hybodontiform and modern sharks (Selachii), pycnodontiforms, Lepidotes and Scheenstia. Invertebrates are represented by an assortment of non-biting midges, hymenopterans (wasps) including multiple parasitoid taxa, coleopterans (beetles), the avicularoid spider Cretamygale, and the ostracod Cypridea.

If Neovenator was indeed present in the older Angeac-Charente bone bed, it would have been part of an entirely different, less well-understood faunal assemblage. The depositional environment of the Angeac-Charente was likely a tropical or subtropical floodplain combined with a poorly oxygenated swamp, with a flora dominated by cheirolepidiacean conifers. Most of the vertebrate fauna of the locality appear to have inhabited and been preserved in the swamp, making it among the few swamp bone beds. The most well-known dinosaur fossils from the Angeac-Charente are an indeterminate basal ornithomimosaur, whose fossils are known in great numbers. Other theropod clades are represented by teeth, including large teeth which have been tentatively assigned to megalosaurids. Remains of a dacentrurine stegosaurian, similar to Dacentrurus, are also known. Some ornithischians are known, including camptosaurs, hypsilophodontids, an indeterminate ankylosaur, and Echinodon sp. Two indeterminate pterodactyloid pterosaurs have been identified.

=== Predation ===
Neovenator was likely similar to other allosauroids in terms of feeding and hunting behaviour, likely targeting smaller species (or juveniles of larger species). There is evidence in the form of bite marks that Neovenator likely preyed on Mantellisaurus. Darren Naish, Steve Hutt and David Martill noted in 2001 that allosauroids in general had limb proportions poorly suited for great speeds, and that Neovenator likely would have hunted through ambush. They speculated that, like what has been suggested for other allosauroids, Neovenator may have ganged up on large prey in a similar fashion to certain crocodilians and Komodo dragons. Since ontogenetic niche partitioning, where juveniles occupy different niches to the adults, has been suggested for certain non-avian dinosaurs, Naish, Hutt, and Martill hypothesised that the same might have applied to Neovenator.

=== Taphonomy ===
The holotype of Neovenator was recovered from a plant debris bed, underlain by sandstone and mudstone, and overlain by further mudstone. Its remains were found in association with multiple fossil logs, bivalves of the family Unionidae, and a partial skeleton of the iguanodontid Brighstoneus. Despite being discovered close to one another, it is likely that the two specimens were swept together by one of two sedimentary pulses (one indicative of a small flood, the other indicative of a far larger flood) which formed the locality.
