= Grange Chine and Marsh Chine =

Geological feature of the Isle of Wight

Grange/Marsh Chine on the Isle of Wight

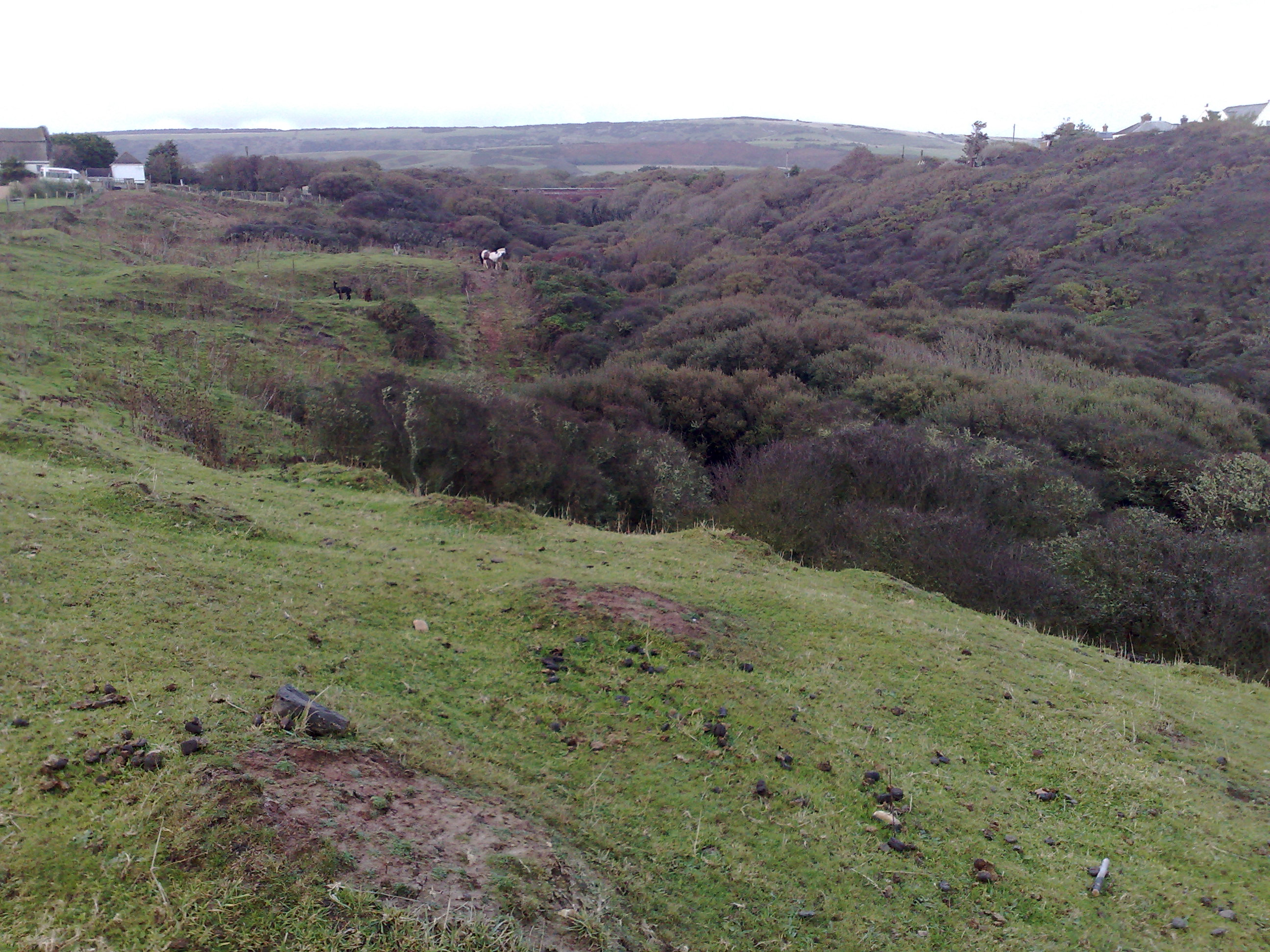
Grange Chine

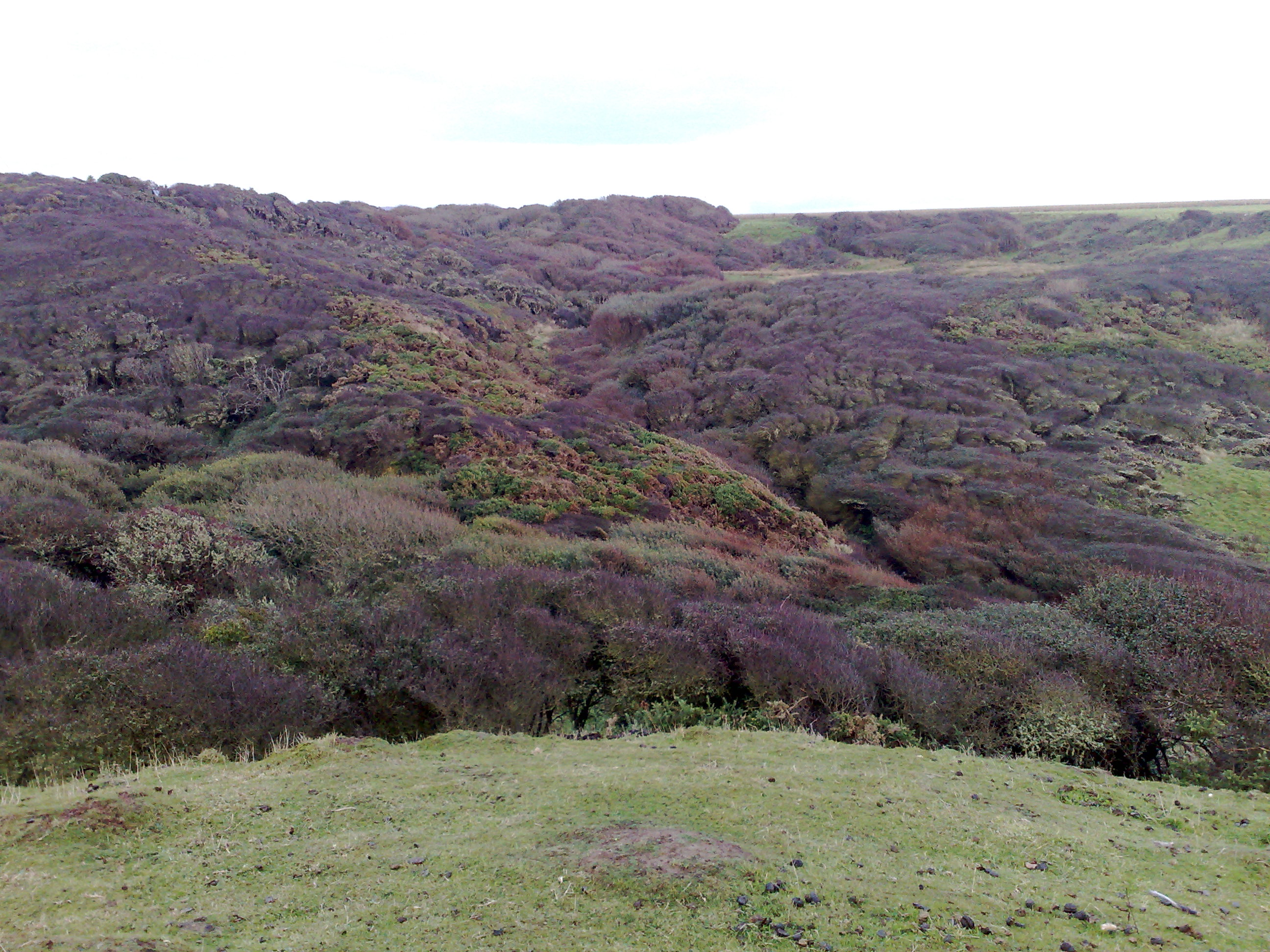
Marsh Chine

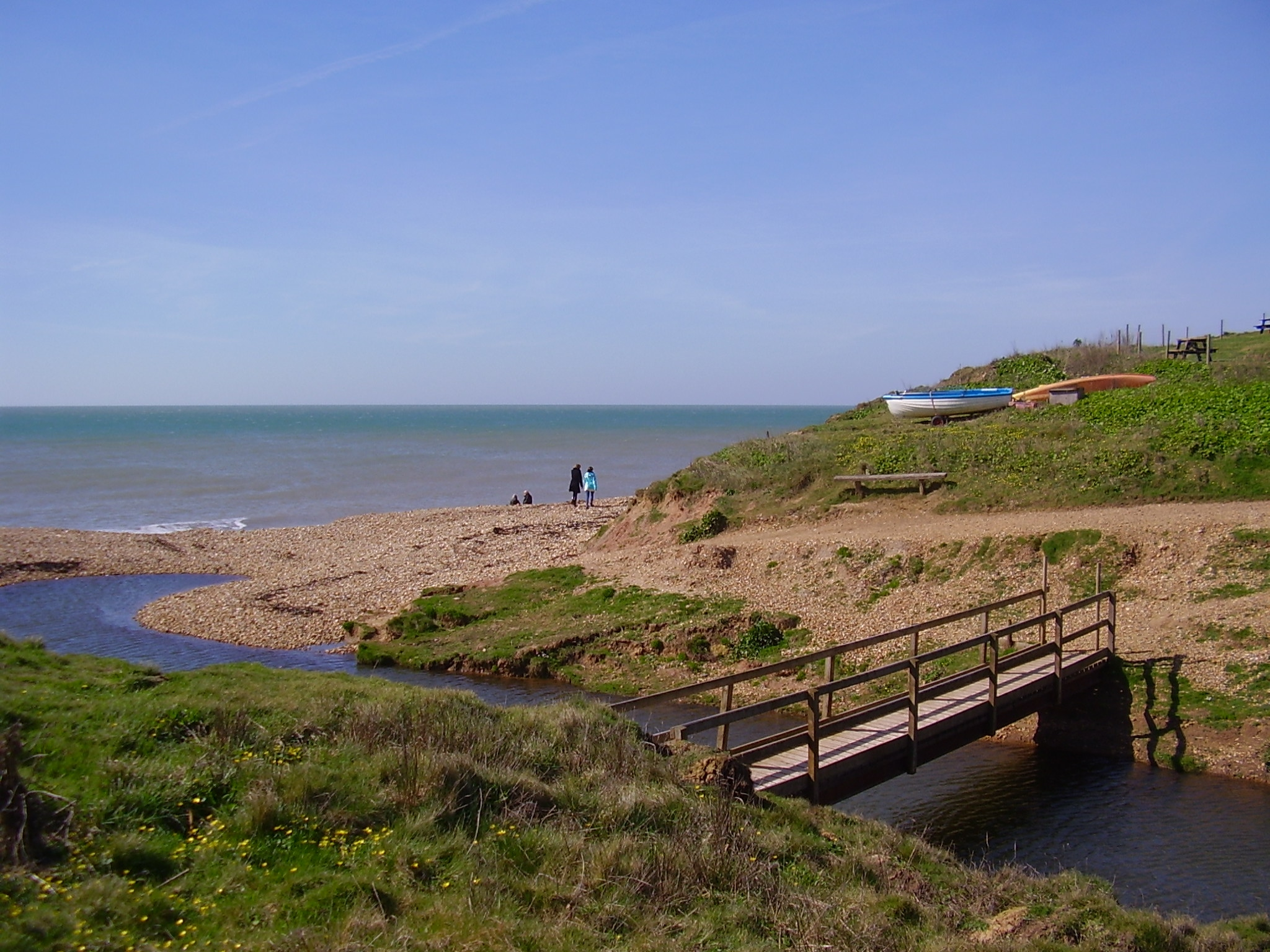
Bottom of Grange Chine (the bridge is now destroyed due to landslips)

Grange Chine and Marsh Chine form a geological feature on the south west coast of the Isle of Wight, England. They lie to the south of the village of Brighstone.

These two chines form the largest chine feature on the Isle of Wight. The Grange Chine starts at the southern edge of Brighstone and runs south-west, crosses under the A3055 Military Road at the hamlet of Marsh Green then continues for about five hundred metres to reach the beach at Brighstone Bay. The Marsh Chine starts to the east of Marsh Green alongside the A3055 and runs west where it joins the larger Grange Chine before it reaches the beach.

Both chines have much shallower sides than other chines on the Isle of Wight and are extensively covered with hardy bushes, stunted trees and scrub.

The Chines drain water from the southern slopes of Brighstone Down and from as far as Shorwell to the east. The stream ( the Buddle Brook) formed is significant enough to power two mills, Yafford Mill and Brighstone Mill, and where it finally drains into the sea the stream is at least four metres wide and is crossed by a small wooden footbridge. Once the stream reaches the pebble beach it soaks in and disappears.

Grange Chine is the location where the first fossils of the dinosaurs Neovenator and Brighstoneus were discovered, following a storm that resulted in a landslide on the chine in 1978.

To the west of the Grange Chine is a holiday park consisting of a campsite and a small number of static caravans. The beach here is often covered in litter.

The Isle of Wight Coastal Path crosses the Grange Chine via a wooden footbridge near the beach.
