= Dinosaur Isle =

Dinosaur museum on the Isle of Wight

Coordinates: 50.6592°N 1.1428°W

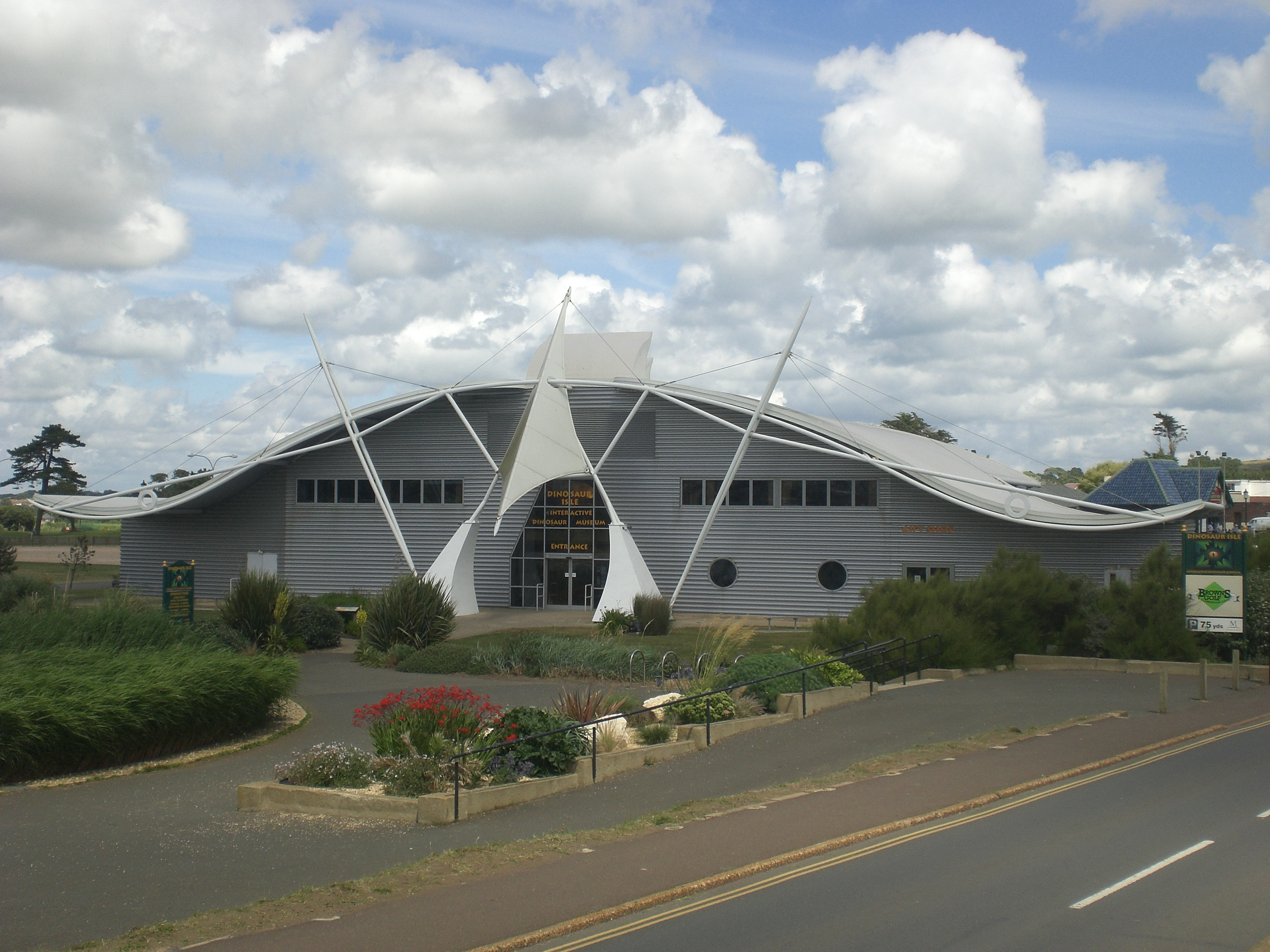
- The outside of Dinosaur Isle
- Established: 2001
- Location: Sandown, Isle of Wight
- Type: Paleontological
- Visitors: 60,000+
- Curator: Martin Munt
- Website: www.dinosaurisle.com

Dinosaur Isle is a purpose-built dinosaur museum located in Sandown on the Isle of Wight in southern England.

The museum was designed by Isle of Wight architect Rainey Petrie Johns in the shape of a giant pterosaur. It claims to be the first custom-built dinosaur museum in Europe.

== History ==
Throughout the 19th century, many collectors such as the Reverend William Fox (1813-1881) excavated the types of new dinosaur genera, including Aristosuchus, Hypsilophodon foxii, and Polacanthus. Most of the discoveries were then transferred to the mainland for study and exhibition, which after some time prompted the Isle of Wight Council to begin its own collection.

In 1923, the Isle of Wight's first geological museum opened in Sandown, under the name of the "Museum of Isle of Wight Geology".

The £2.7 million cost of Dinosaur Isle, the new museum, was provided by Isle of Wight Council and the National Lottery Millennium Commission. Dinosaur Isle opened to visitors on 10 August 2001. It currently houses 40,000 specimens, including nearly 200 types. The museum offers many field trips to discover the island's main palaeontological sites.

== Exhibits ==
The visit to the museum begins with a presentation of the different past ecosystems that can be found in different parts of the island. This area begins with Pleistocene fossils, including those of Bison antiquus. The repaired animatronic of an Ophthalmosaurus from the BBC's Walking with Dinosaurs is also in this section. The first Mesozoic animals are displayed outside of the main room, with a sauropod being displayed at the very end, and several exhibits dedicated to Mesozoic marine life.

The large central room is dedicated to dinosaurs. Many life-size replicas and models are found there, including ornithischians such as Iguanodon, Polacanthus and Hypsilophodon, in addition to saurischians like Eotyrannus. Additionally, a large allosauroid theropod, Neovenator salerii (discovered in 1978 and described by Steve Hutt one of the curators of the museum) is also exhibited, as is a replica skeleton of Megalosaurus. The skeleton of the Iguanodon MIWG.5126 (or Pink Iggy) is particularly noteworthy among the museum's collection. It was discovered in 1976 by Steve Hutt, and is mostly articulated. It is named after the minerals in the matrix it was discovered in, which gave the rocks a pink colouration. The holotype of the small crocodyliform Koumpiodontosuchus is also displayed.

On one of the walls of the room, reconstructions of heads of different pterosaurs are displayed. Indeed, the museum houses the holotype of the ornithocheirid Caulkicephalus.

Dinosaur fossils also include the type specimens of the ornithischian species Brighstoneus simmondsi (MIWG 6344) and Istiorachis macarthurae (MIWG 6643).

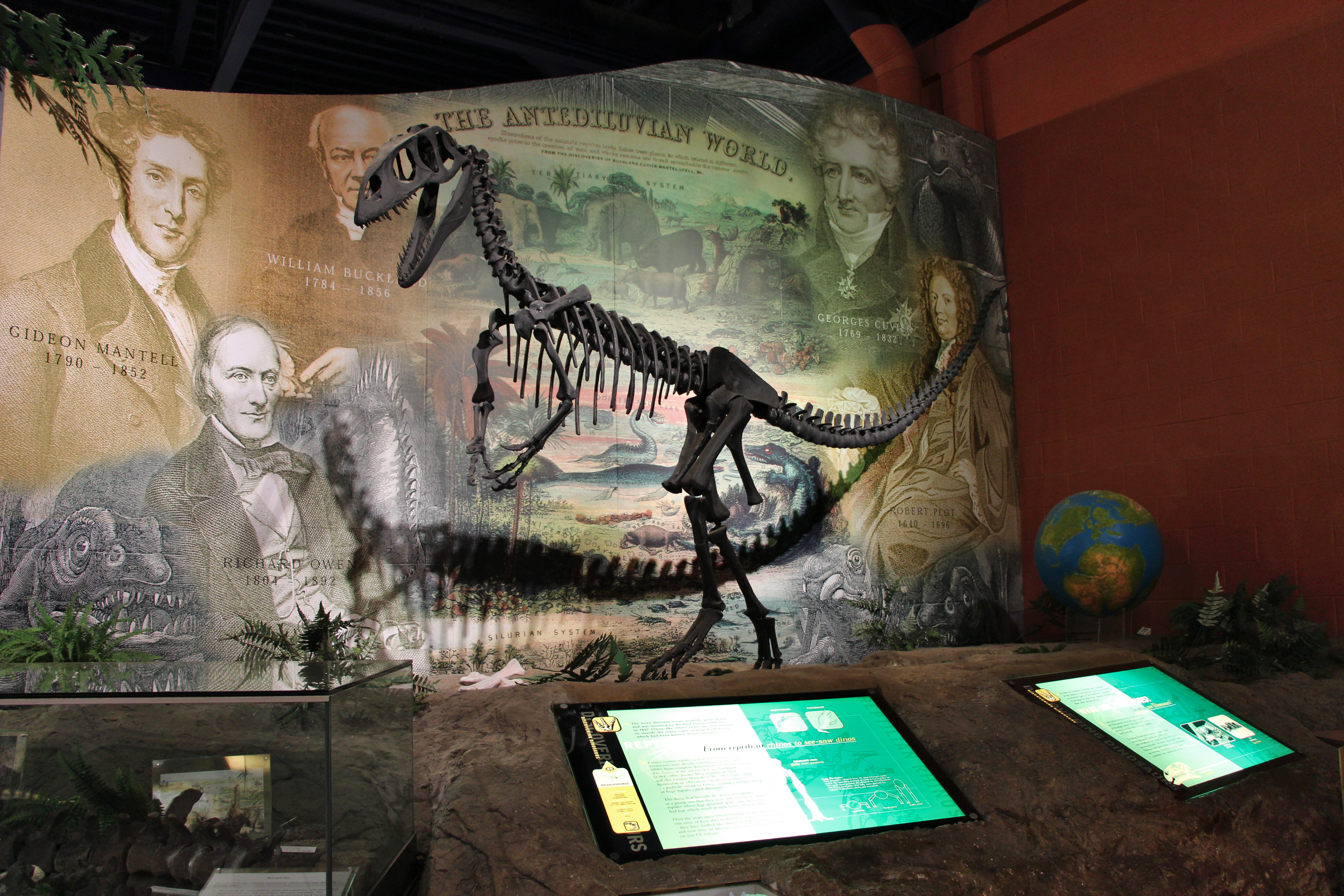
First discoveries of Dinosaurs in England

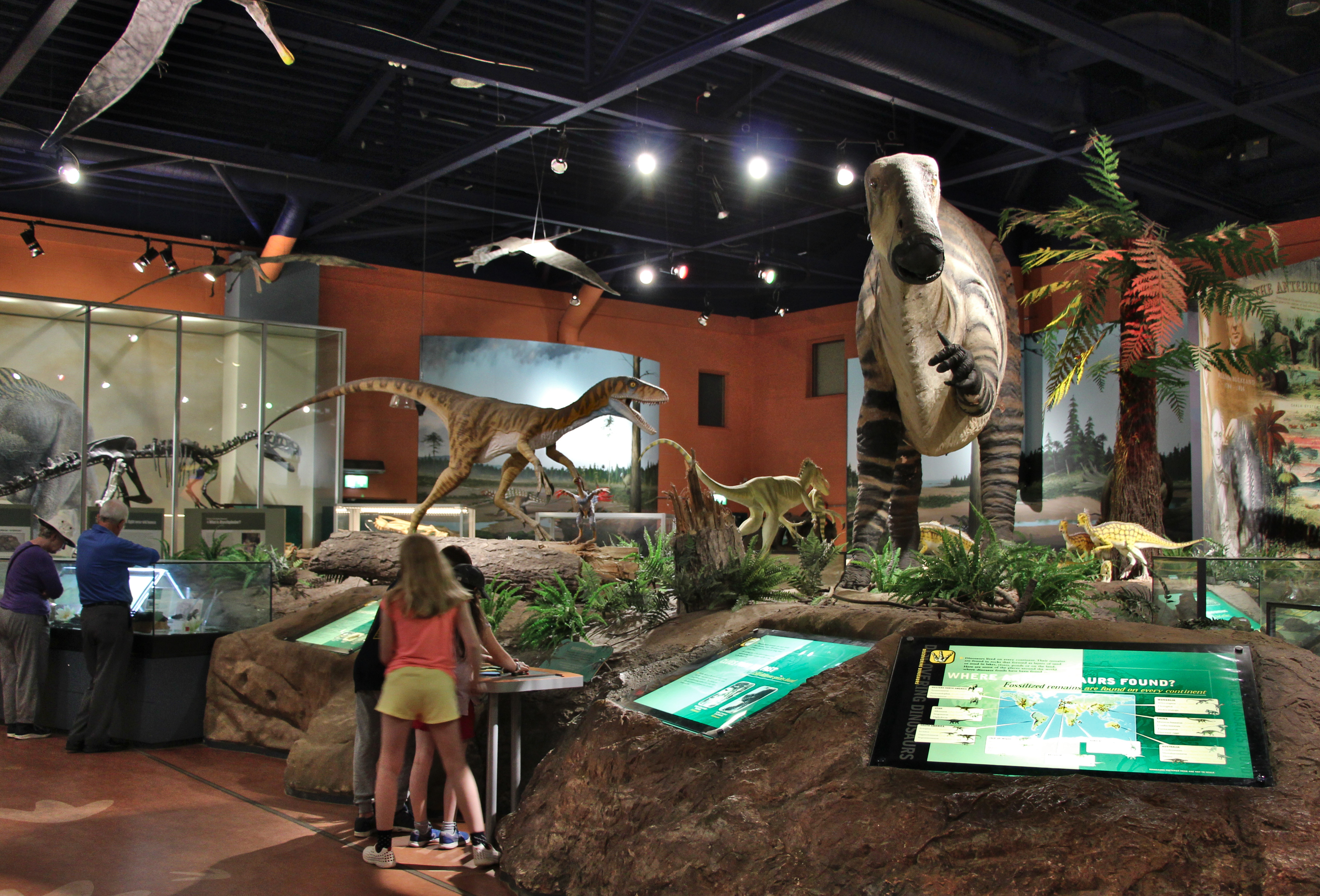
Dinosaur Hall

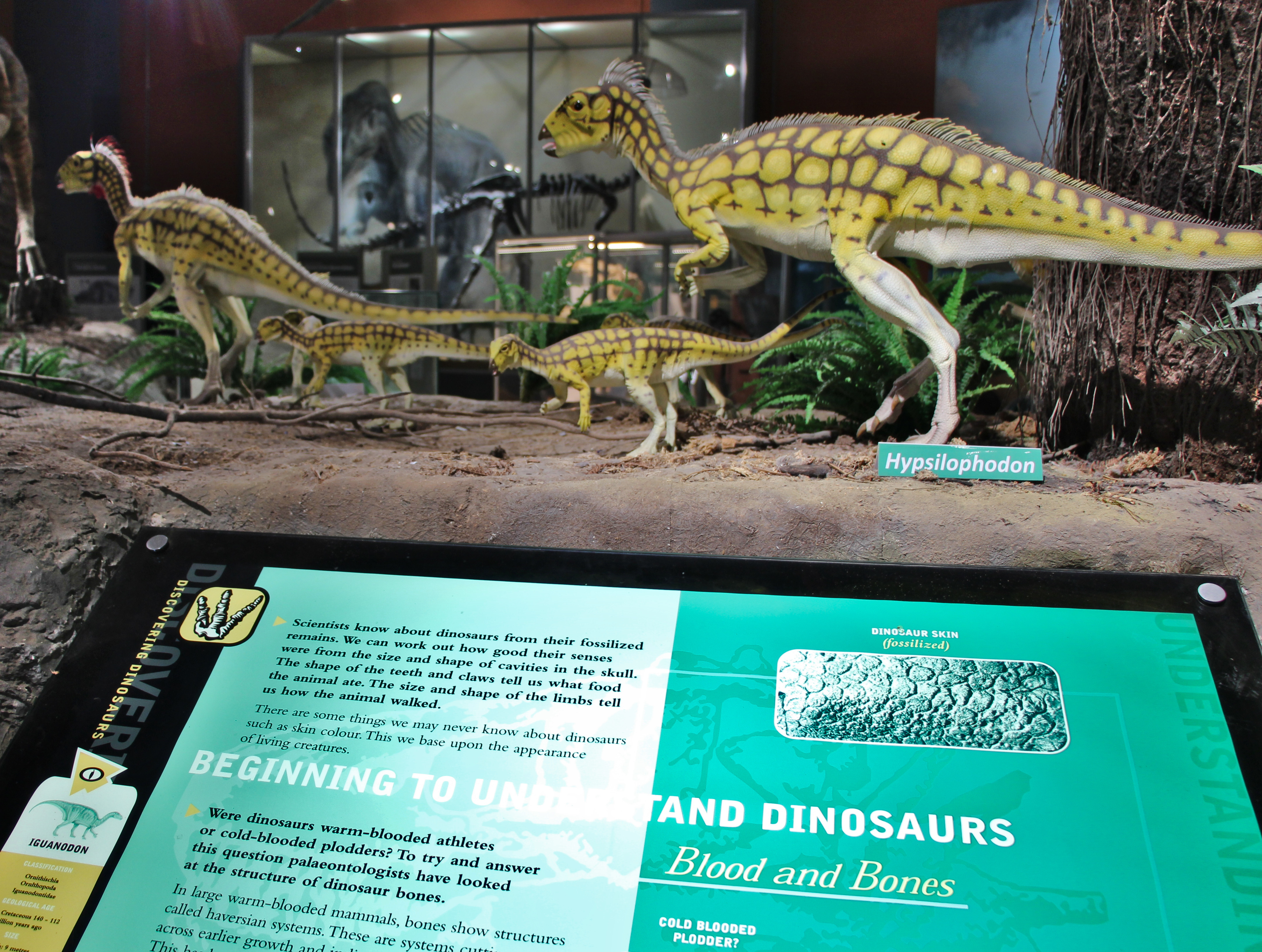
[Hypsilophodon foxii life size model on display

Visitors to the museum are given the opportunity to speak to resident palaeontologists and watch them at work.

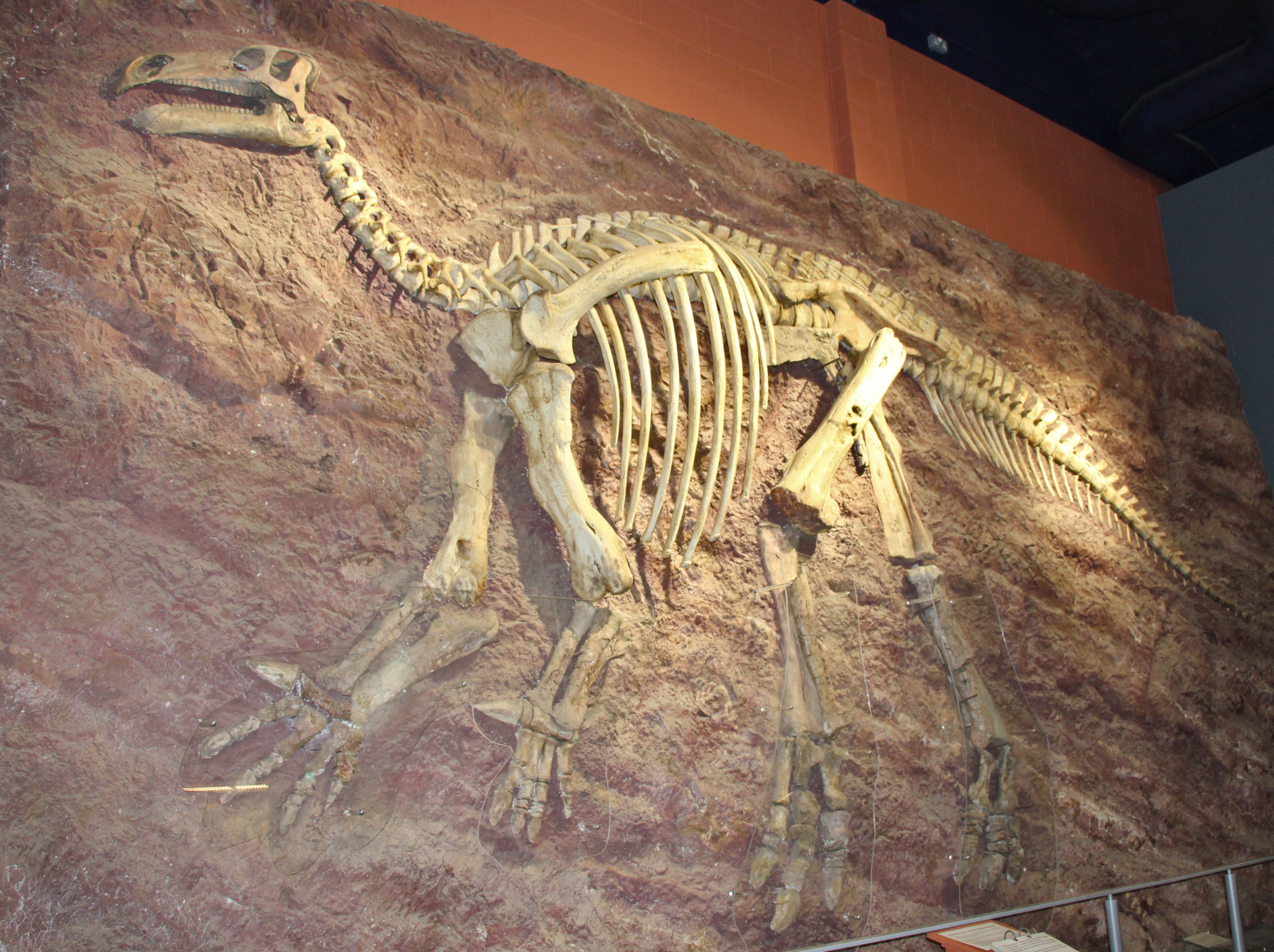
Pink Iggy, Iguanodon skeleton

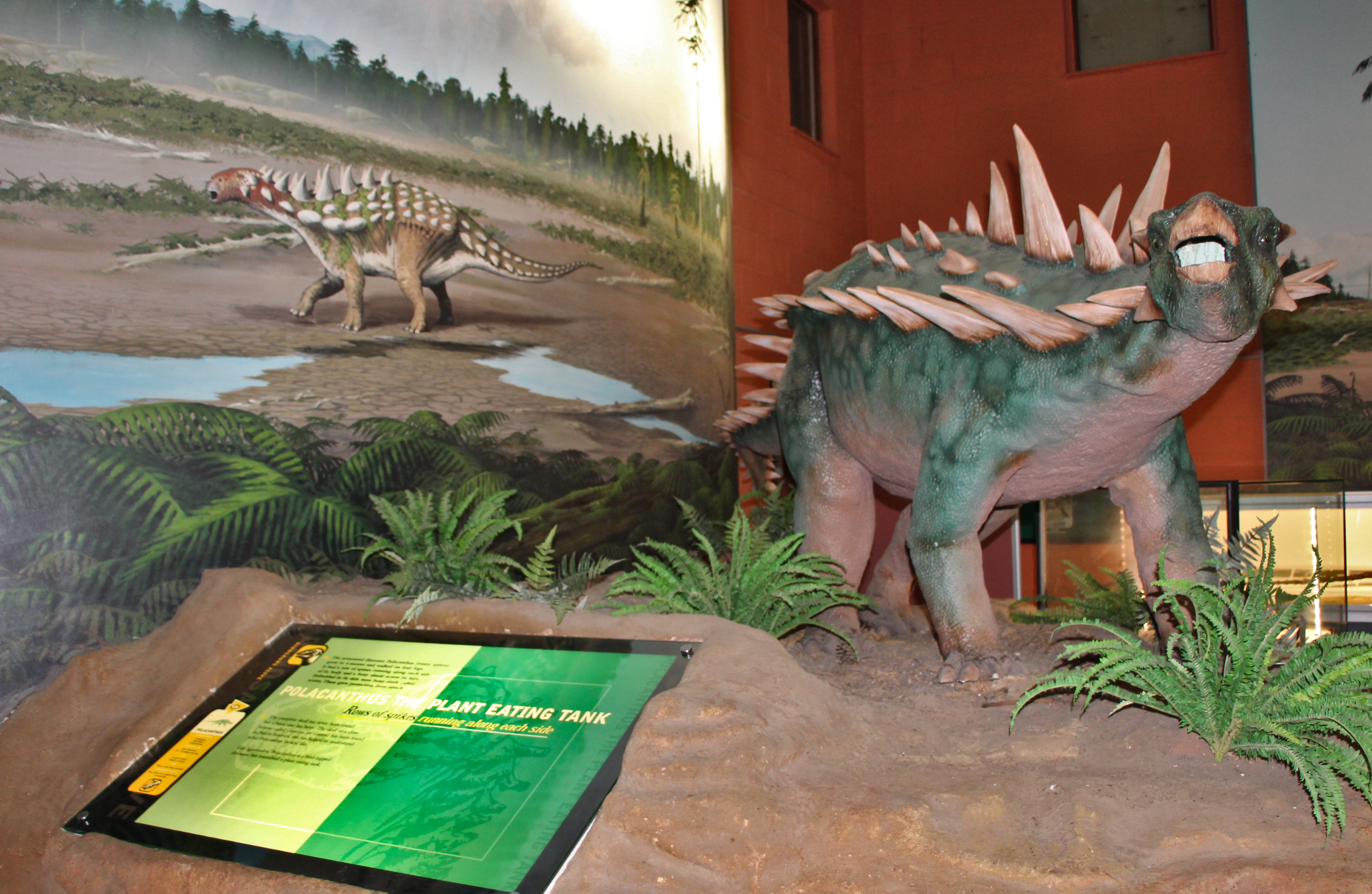
Polacanthus foxi life size model on display

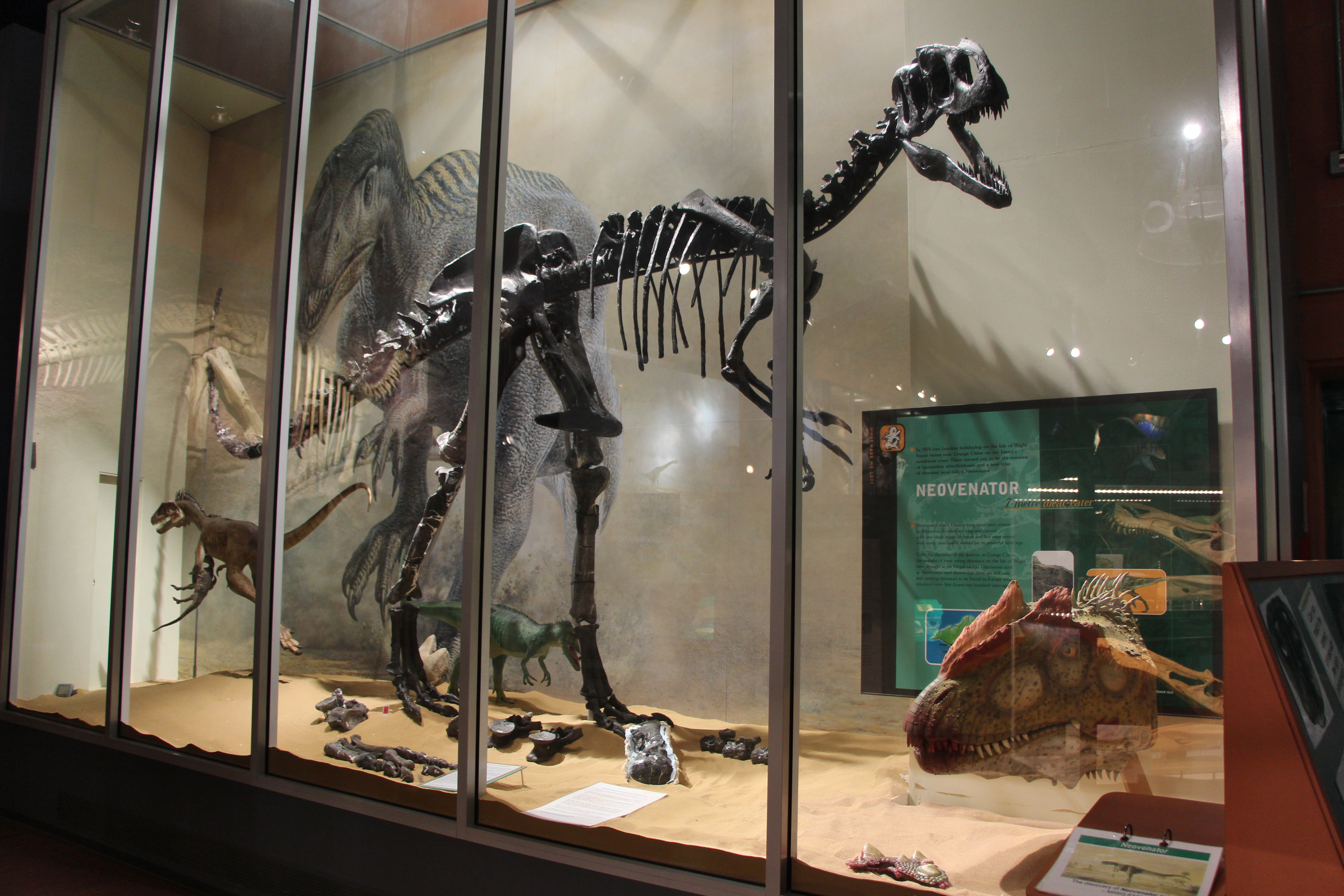
Neovenator Salerii discovered in 1978 in the isle of Wight

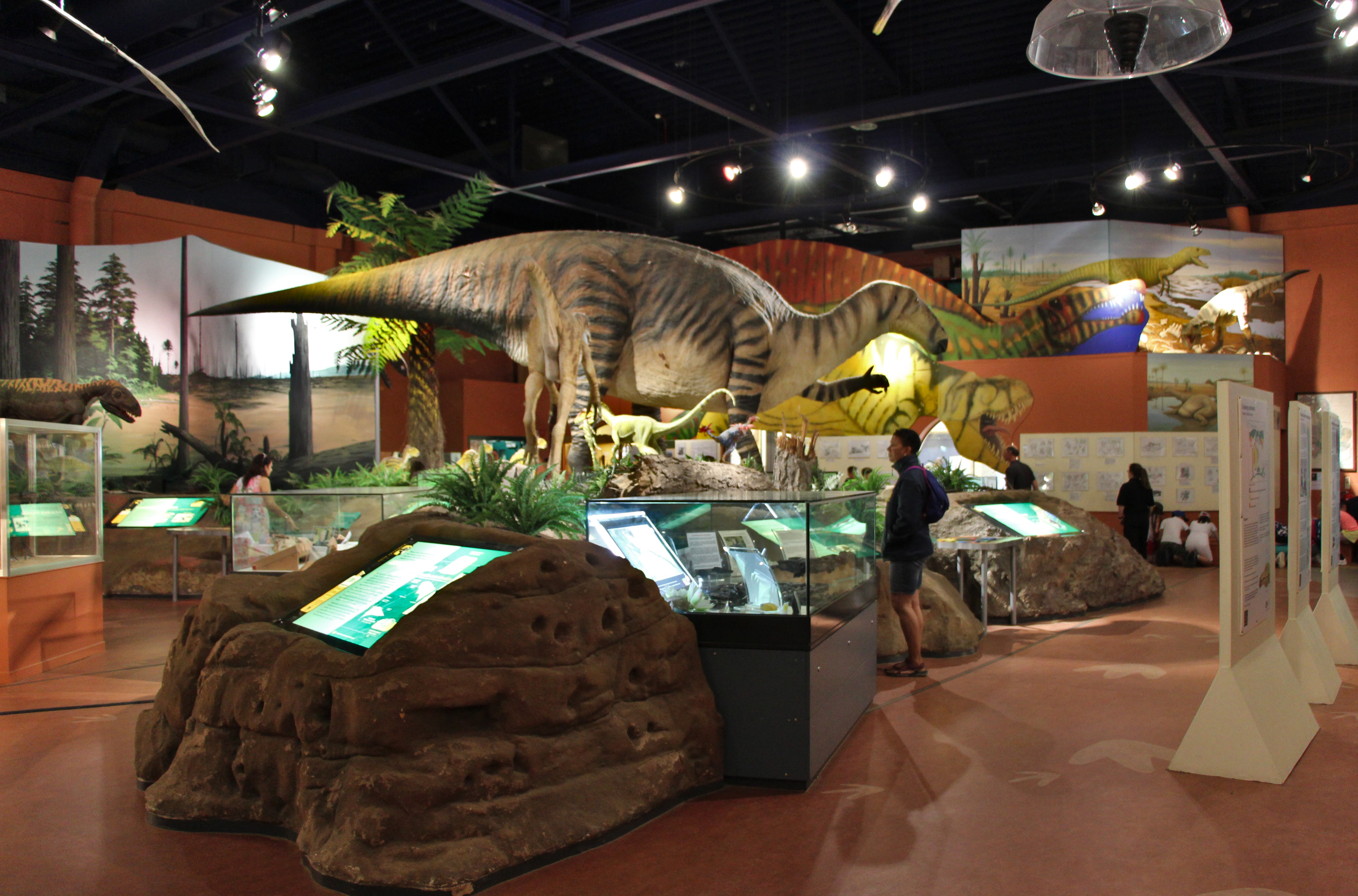
Dinosaur Hall

== See also ==
- Dinosaurs of the Isle of Wight
