= Brighstone Bay =

Coordinates: 50°38′N 1°24′W

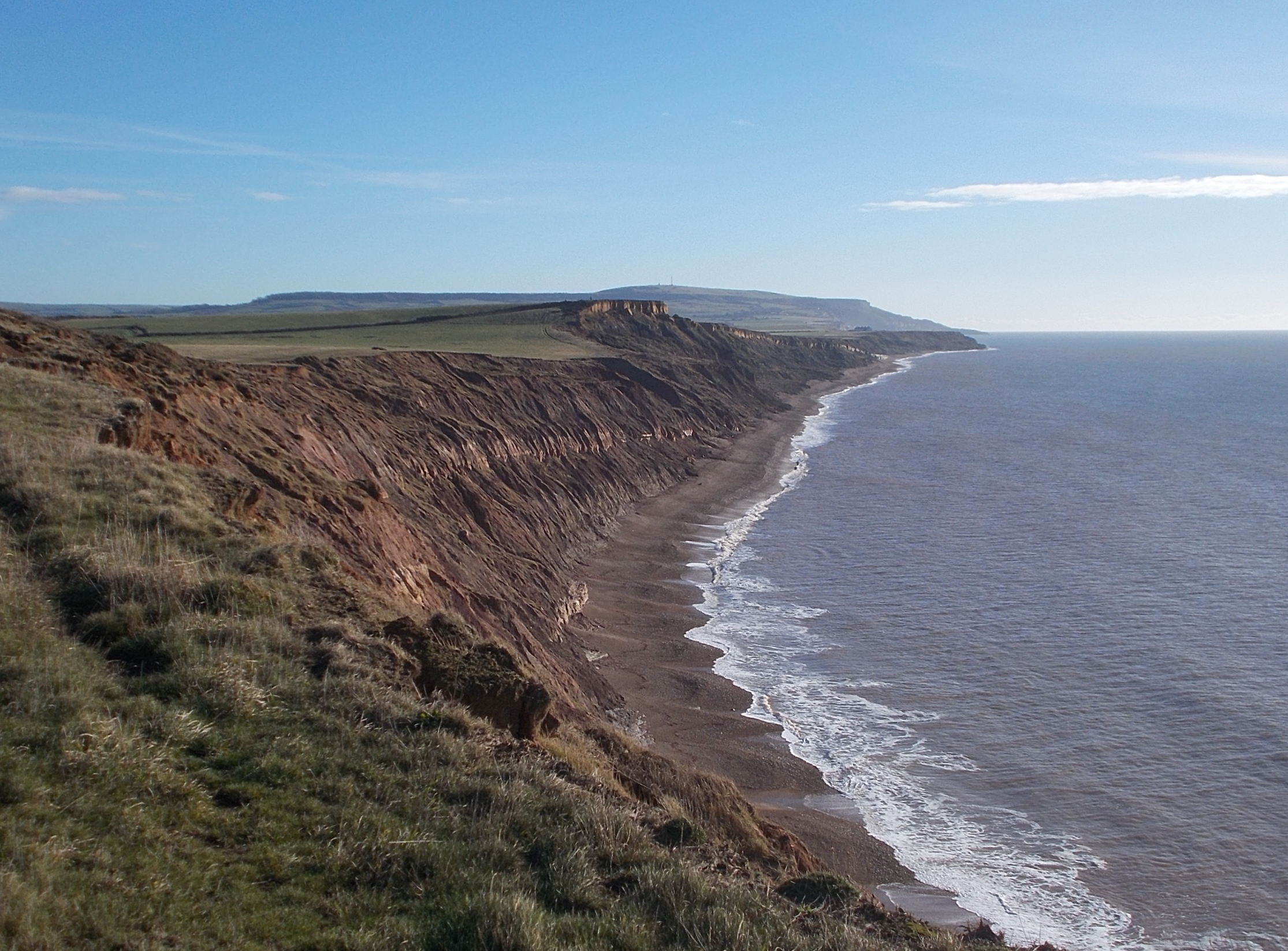
- Brighstone Bay

- Location within the Isle of Wight
- Civil parish: Brighstone
- Ceremonial county: Isle of Wight
- Region: South East
- Country: England
- Sovereign state: United Kingdom

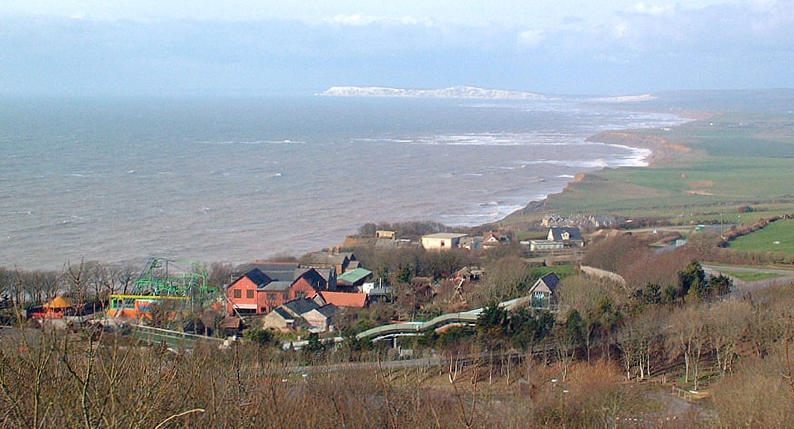
Distant view of Brighstone Bay beyond the first point

Brighstone Bay is a bay on the southwest coast of the Isle of Wight, England. It lies to the south and west of the village of Brighstone from which it takes its name. It faces southwest towards the English Channel, its shoreline is 5 miles (8 km) in length and is gently curving. It stretches from Sudmoor Point in the northwest to Artherfield Point in the southeast.

Several chines, including Grange Chine, through which the Buddle Brook flows, are found along this stretch of coast. Like much of the southwestern coast of the island, Brighstone Bay is affected by ongoing coastal erosion. The area is well known for its paleontological significance, with dinosaur remains frequently discovered along the shoreline. Including, a partial sauropod skeleton was found by researchers from University of Portsmouth.

Off the shore, Brighstone Ledge is one of several underwater rock formations along this stretch, known as the Back of the Wight. This area has been the site of numerous shipwrecks over the centuries, as storms have driven vessels onto the hidden rocks.

The seabed consists of a mix of mud, sand, and shells, while the beach itself is predominantly shingle. The Isle of Wight Coastal Path which follows the whole bay along the cliff top, which offers scenic views of the bay.
