= Buddle Brook =

River on the Isle of Wight, England

Coordinates: 50.634°N 1.407°W

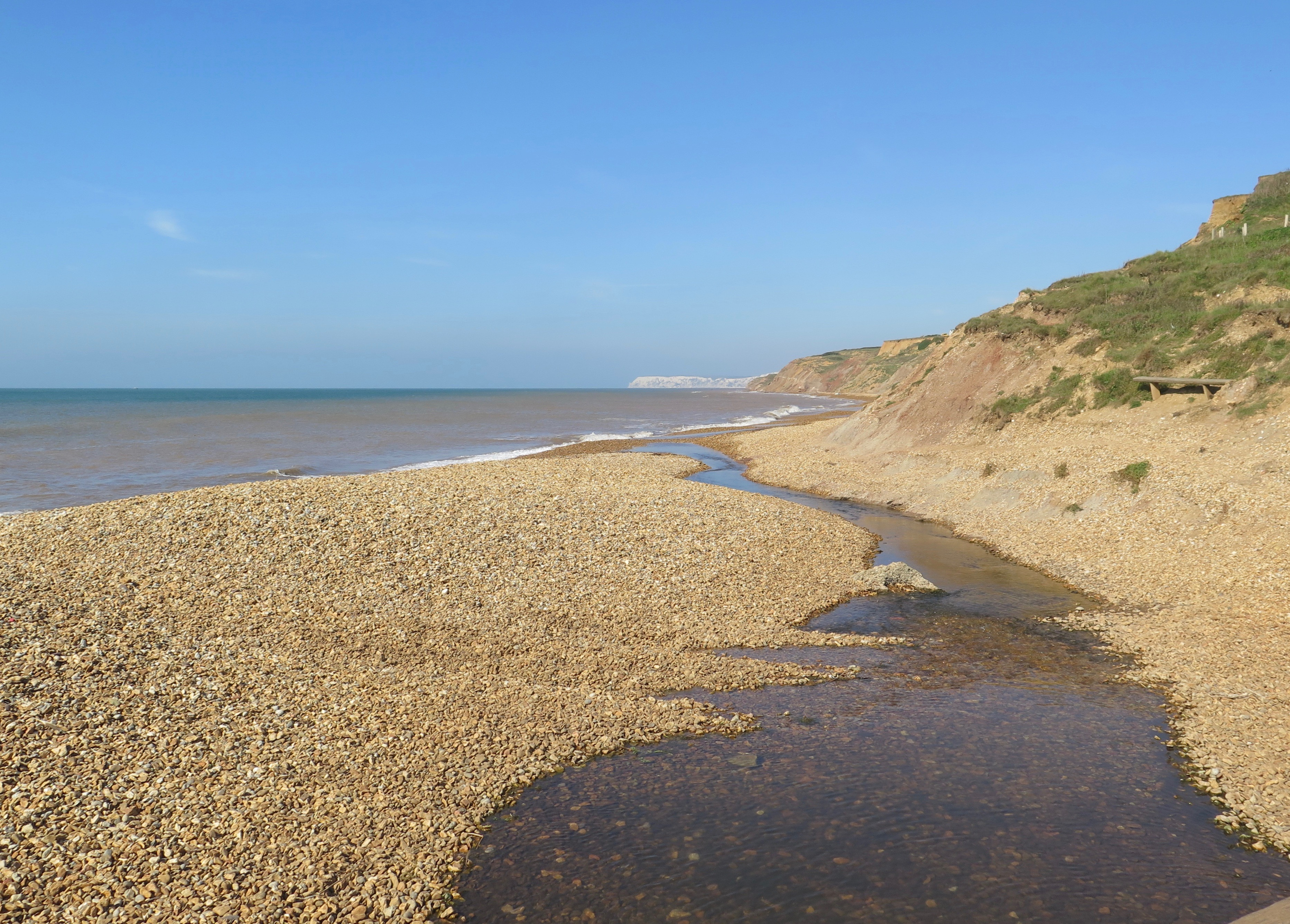
Meeting the sea at Grange and Marsh Chine

Buddle Brook (also called Brighstone Brook) is a small river on the Isle of Wight, England. The brook drains water from the southern side of Brighstone Down and as far to the east as the village of Shorwell. Its flow is the greatest of the streams in the South-West of the Island (the Back of the Wight). Near the village of Brighstone its body is split into a series of mill ponds built to power Yafford Mill and Brighstone Mill, and controlled ways passing through the village and under the noted local landmark, the Dragon Tree. Beyond the village the stream is re-connected into one and flows into Grange/Marsh Chine. These are heavily vegetated and are the largest chine on the Island. The Brook runs all the way to the beach where its mouth is at least 13 ft 1 in (4m) wide. Once the stream reaches the pebble beach it soaks in and disappears.

The Romans built a villa near Brighstone to make use of the brook's fresh water.

The name means 'the dwelling-place', from Old English bōthl.
