= List of Palmerston Forts on the Isle of Wight =

Coastal defence forts around the Isle of Wight

Isle of Wight
Locations of Palmerston Forts on the Isle of Wight.

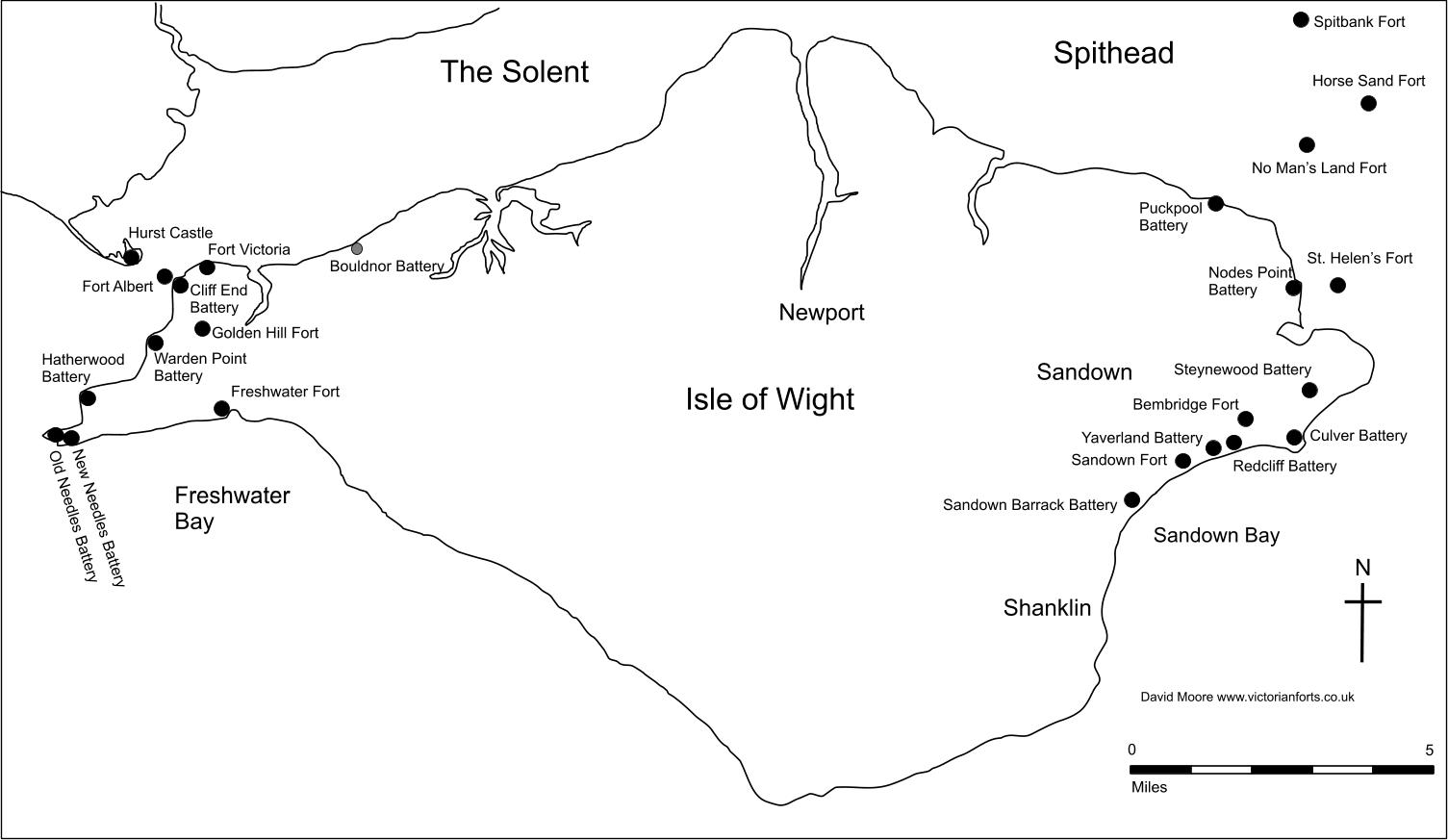
Plan of the Victorian defences of the Isle of Wight

The Palmerston Forts are a group of forts and associated structures built during the Victorian period on the recommendations of the 1860 Royal Commission on the Defence of the United Kingdom. The name comes from their association with Lord Palmerston, who was Prime Minister at the time and promoted the idea.

The structures were built as a response to a perceived threat of a French invasion. The works were also known as Palmerston's Follies as, by the time they were completed the threat (if it had ever existed) had passed, largely due to the Franco-Prussian War of 1870 and technological advancements leading to the guns becoming out-of-date.

As well as new structures, extensive modifications were made to existing defences.

The defences on the Isle of Wight were built to protect the approaches to the Solent, Southampton and Portsmouth. They consist of three separate groups, those at the western end of the island, those at the eastern end, and four built in the Solent.

The information in the tables is taken from documents for each site, from the Victorian Forts website.

== Western end ==
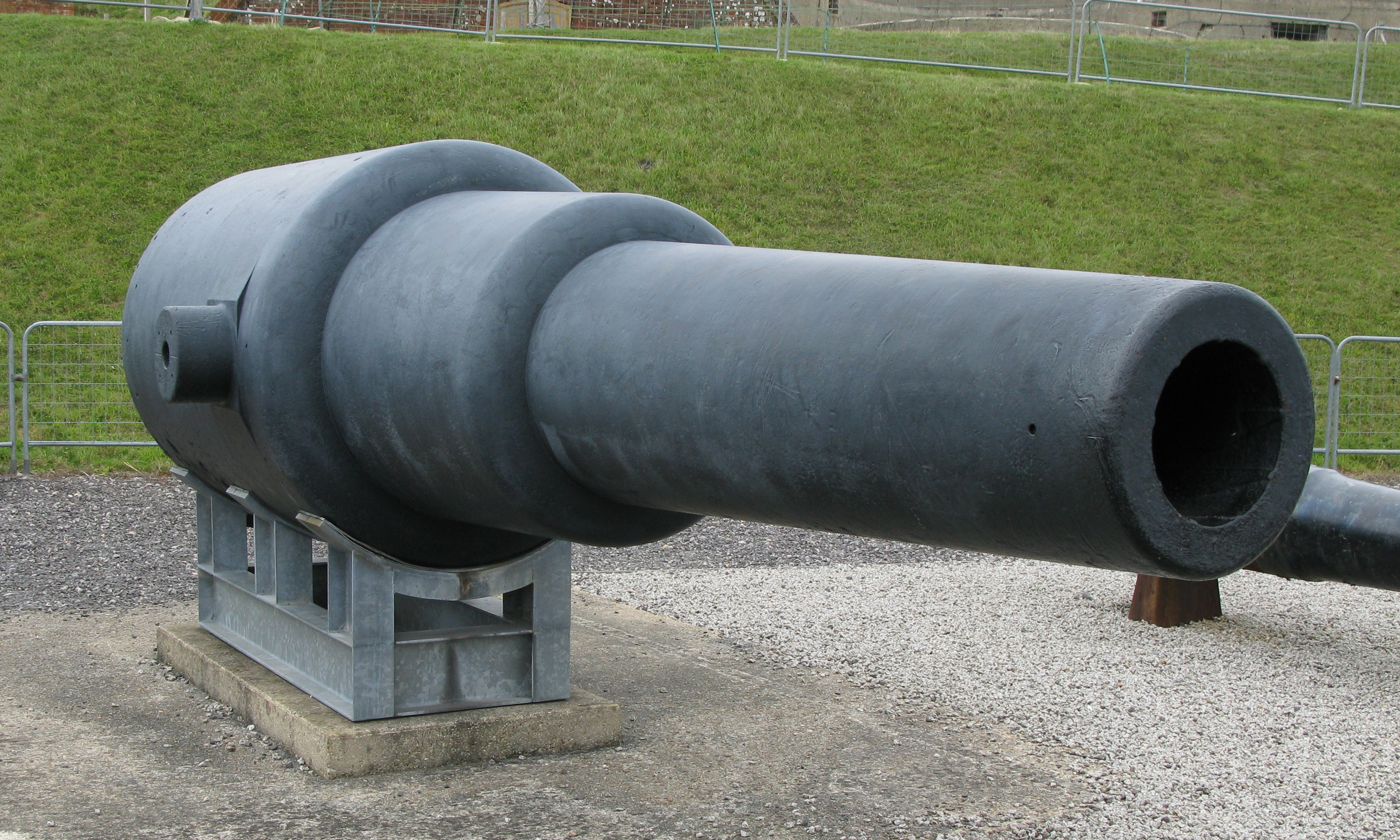
A 12.5 inch gun from Cliff End Battery

Site name	Location	Open to the public?	Construction began	Construction ended	Cost	Grid reference	Map
Fort Victoria	Sconce Point, Yarmouth	check	1852	1855	£40,000	SZ338897	
Fort Albert (aka 'Cliff End Fort')	Cliff End, Freshwater	☒	1854	1856	Unknown	SZ329890	
Freshwater Redoubt	Freshwater Bay	☒	1855	1856	Unknown	SZ344855	
The Needles Batteries	Alum Bay	check	1861	1863	£7,656	SZ295848	
Warden Point Battery	Warden Point, Freshwater	☒	1862	1863	£12,899	SZ325876	
Cliff End Battery	Cliff End, Freshwater	☒	1862	1868	£32,714	SZ332890	
Golden Hill Fort	Afton Down	☒	1863	1868	£38,022	SZ339879	
Hatherwood Battery	Alum Bay	check	1865	1869	£5,825	SZ307858	
The New Needles Battery	Alum Bay	check	1893	1895	£9,821	SZ299847	
Bouldnor Battery	Bouldnor	☒	1937	1938	Unknown	SZ379902	

== Eastern end ==
Site name	Location	Open to the public?	Construction began	Construction ended	Cost	Grid reference	Map
Puckpool Battery	Puckpool Point	check	1863	1865	20,864	SZ615923	
Nodes Point Battery	Nodes Point	check	1901	1904	£21,654	SZ635898	
Steynewood Battery	Whitecliff Bay	☒	1889	1893	Unknown	SZ641869	
Culver Battery	Culver Down	check	1904	1906	Unknown	SZ638855	
Bembridge Fort	Bembridge Down	☒	1862	1867	£48,925	SZ624861	
Redcliff Battery	Culver Down	check	1861	1863	£4,776	SZ638855	
Yaverland Battery	Yaverland	check	1861	1864	15,183	SZ612849	
Sandown Fort	Sandown Bay	check	1861	1864	£73,876	SZ597839	
Sandown Barrack Battery	Sandown Bay	check	1861	1863	£62,331	SZ594837	

- List of forts on the Isle of Wight

== Solent ==
- Spitbank Fort
- St Helens Fort
- Horse Sand Fort
- No Man's Land Fort

== Bibliography ==
- Solent Papers No. 2 The Needles Defences by Anthony Cantwell - ISBN 978-0-9513234-9-6
- Solent Papers No. 10 The East Wight Defences by David Moore - ISBN 978-0-9548453-3-9
