= Fortifications of the Isle of Wight =

Many forts and fortifications have been built to protect the Isle of Wight (South England) from foreign invasion. Throughout history the island has been a site of key military importance. Controlling both entrances to the Solent and the home of the Royal Navy, Portsmouth. This is a list of most of the fortifications on the island.

== Palmerston Forts ==
The Palmerston Forts are forts built during the Victorian era. The name comes from their association with Lord Palmerston, who was the Prime Minister of the time and promoted the idea.

The structures were built as a response to a perceived threat of a French invasion.

The defences on the Isle of Wight were built to protect the approaches to the Solent, Southampton and Portsmouth. There are three groups, those at the west end of the island, those at the east end, and four in the Solent.

The information is taken from documents for each of the sites, courtesy of the Victorian Forts website.

== Bembridge Fort ==
Built on Bembridge Down it is one of the Palmerston Forts built to protect against perceived French invasion threats.

== Cliff End Battery ==
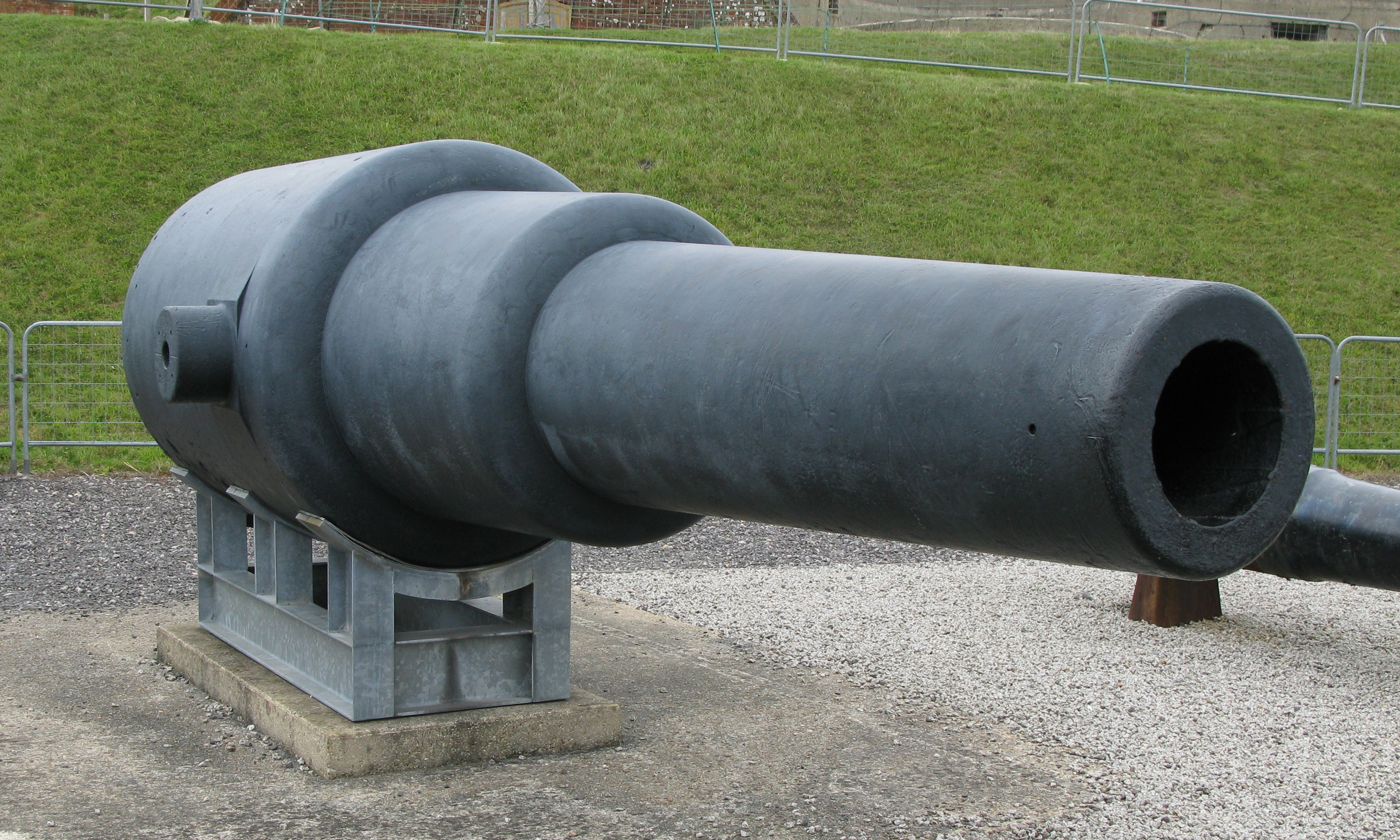
A 12.5 inch gun from Cliff End Battery

Built on the west coast of the Island it is one of the Palmerston Forts built to protect against perceived French invasion threats.

== Fort Albert ==
Fort Albert was built in 1856 on an artificial island to defend the western approaches to Portsmouth. It was intended to house 29 guns in four tiers, it was one of the last gun-towers built in England.

== Fort Victoria ==
Fort Victoria was a battery with barracks built west of Yarmouth in the 1850s, it was later used as a submarine mining centre and military training area.

The barrack blocks were demolished in 1969, but the casemates were not, and this is all that remains of the Fort. The fort can now be visited in its role as a country park.

== Freshwater Redoubt ==
Freshwater Redoubt (or Fort Redoubt) Was built on the west coast of the Island at Freshwater bay as one of the Palmerston Forts built to protect against perceived French invasion threats.

== Nodes Point Battery ==
Built on the east of the Island at Nodes Point it is one of the Palmerston Forts built to protect against perceived French invasion threats.

== Puckpool Battery ==
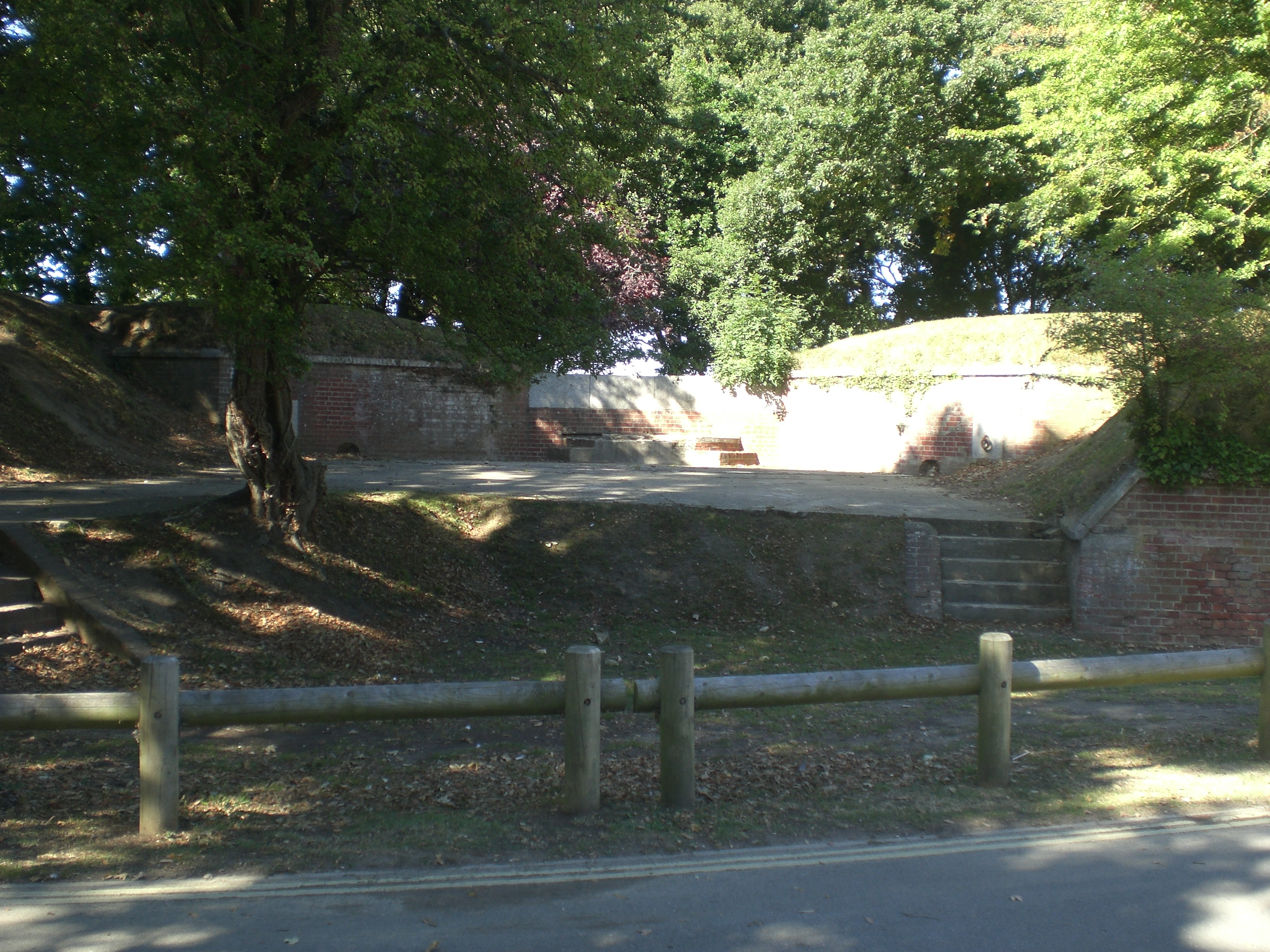
A part of Puckpool Battery

Built at Puckpool point in the east it is one of the Palmerston Forts built to protect against perceived French invasion threats.

== Redcliff Battery ==
Redcliff Battery is a battery located west of Culver Cliffs and east of Yaverland. It is one of the many Palmerston Forts built to protect against perceived French invasion threats.

== Sandown Battery ==
Sandown Barrack Battery is a battery located in Sandown Bay. A Palmerston Fort built on the island to protect against perceived French invasion threats.

== Sandown Castle ==
Sandown Castle was one of Henry VIII's Device Forts. The Device Forts (Henrician Castles) were built as a network of coastal defences to defend against the French and Spanish after his break from the Roman Catholic Church. Although Sandown Castle was never attacked, it was the scene of a battle with French invaders. The French were repulsed.

== Sandown Fort ==
Built at Sandown in the east it is one of the Palmerston Forts built to protect against perceived French invasion threats.

== Steynewood Battery ==
Built in the east it is one of the Palmerston Forts built to protect against perceived French invasion threats.

== Warden Point Battery ==
Warden Point Battery is a battery on the Isle of Wight begun in 1862, that was originally armed with 7-inch and 9-inch rifled muzzle loaders on barbette mountings. In use until 1936.

== Yarmouth Castle ==
Yarmouth Castle is a small off-square blockhouse built by Henry VIII in 1547, to guard Yarmouth, Isle of Wight harbour. It was built as part of Henry's second device programme to fortify the English coast with a chain of coastal defences known as Device Forts or Henrician Castles. These were built to guard against the threat of foreign invasion. As it is a later fortification it did not have the earlier rounded or concentric shape but a square keep with angular bastions. It is now owned by English Heritage.

== Yaverland Battery ==
Built in the east at Yaverland it is one of the Palmerston Forts built to protect against perceived French invasion threats. During the Second World War it was used by the Home Guard.
