= Culver Battery =

Artillery battery in England

- Culver Down, Isle of Wight, England
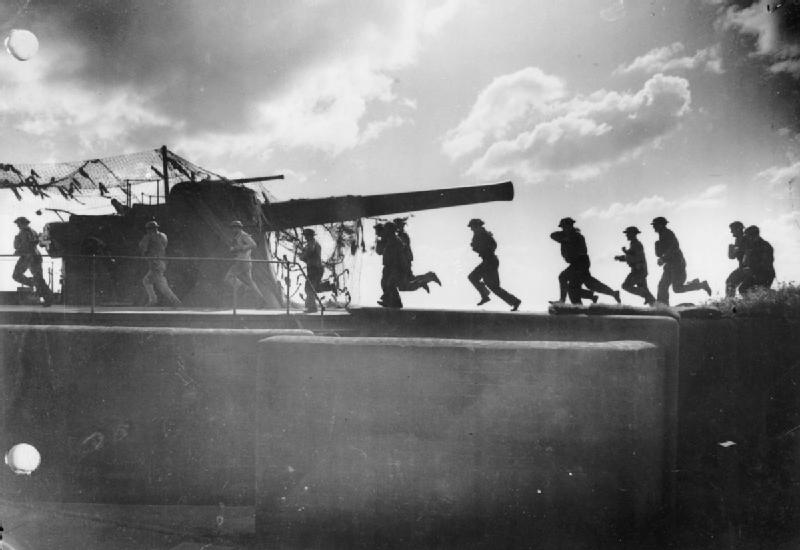
- A crew from 118th Battery ready one of the two 9.2 inch gun coastal defence guns for action at Culver Point Battery, August 1940

Site information
- Controlled by: National Trust
- Open to the public: Yes
- Condition: Ruined

Location
- Coordinates: 50°39′58″N 1°05′53″W

Site history
- Built: 21 July 1906
- Built by: British Army
- Materials: Concrete
- Demolished: 1956
- Events: First World War; Second World War

Garrison information
- Garrison: 527th Coast Regiment

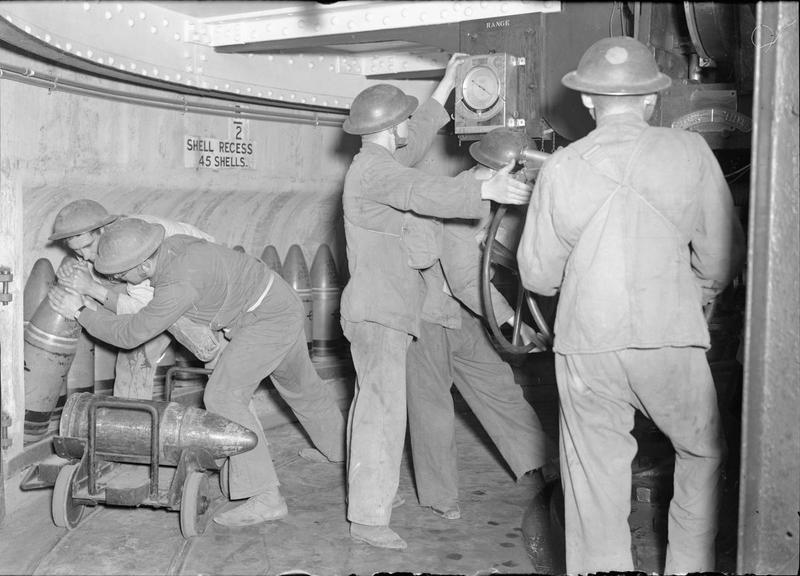
Preparing shells for one of the 9.2-inch gun at Culver Battery on 24 August 1940.

Culver Battery is a former coastal artillery battery on Culver Down, on the eastern side of the Isle of Wight, England. The fortification is one of several Palmerston Forts built on the island following concerns about the size and strength of the French Navy in the late 19th century. It was operational during the First and Second World Wars. The battery was closed in 1956.

== Planning ==
A battery on the eastern cliff of Culver Down was first proposed in 1887. Its purpose was to stop enemy ships firing unopposed at the pre-existing batteries at Yaverland and Redcliff. The new fortification would be armed with three 6-inch breechloaders with two QF 6-pounder Hotchkiss in support. The guns would all be fitted on hydraulically operated disappearing mounts. However, by 1889, even though the battery had still not been built, the War Office had decided the Hotchkiss would be replaced with 4.7-inch guns.

The delay in construction was caused by a disagreement at the War Office between the Inspector-General of Fortifications and the Director of Artillery over the installation of disappearing mounts. Objections were raised over their necessity because Culver Down is atop a cliff, 300 ft (91 m) above the shoreline. The row led to further delay as the funding for the military project was no longer available.

== Construction ==
The battery was eventually built between 3 May 1904 and 21 July 1906. The two main gun emplacements, which were built from brick and reinforced concrete, each had a fixed barbette that housed a 9.2-inch Mk X gun. A report in 1906 by the Royal Engineers stated:

... this important new work is now nearing completion it only requires a set of 1.8-inch accumulator pipes for A/2. Autosights and cams will no doubt arrive in due course. The ammunition for these guns is stored at Bembridge Fort. The position Finding cell is well advanced. The magazines were constructed ... between the two emplacements, underground. The rear was closed with an unclimbable fence and formed into a Twydall Profile.

Due to the purpose of the battery being to deter naval attack, its two 9.2-inch guns were not intended to cover Sandown Bay. But they could fire as far as Spithead, bombarding any enemy ship entering The Solent. Its command post was in the same building as the Port War Signal Station, which was located between the battery and Bembridge Fort to the north.

== First World War ==
During the First World War, the battery's main role was to defend the Isle of Wight's torpedo boats' anchorage against long-range fire from armoured cruisers. Under war-time conditions, the battery had toilets, wash block, mess, and general storerooms as well as a workshop and telephone room. When not on duty, guns crews lived in the barracks at Bembridge Fort. Ammunition was kept in bombardment-proof underground magazines behind the emplacements. Additional shells and cordite were stored at Bembridge. In addition to the two coastal guns, the battery had a 6-pound Hotchkiss that was used as an anti-aircraft weapon.

== Inter-war period ==
Between 1922 and 1924 the battery's barbettes were replaced with new mountings that allowed the guns to elevate up to 30 degrees, increasing the effective range beyond 6,000 yd (5,500 m). In 1927, Culver was used as the test centre for the Fortress Plotting system, a type of experimental corrected firing for coastal artillery. In 1934 three 6-inch B.L. mark VII guns were temporarily fitted on 45-degree mountings for long range gunnery trials. An experimental twin-6 pounder was installed to test fire control in the mid-1930s.

== Second World War ==
By the outbreak of the Second World War in 1939, Culver Down was manned by 118th Battery from the 527th Coast Regiment. The battery's two main guns now had ranges of up to 17,000 yd (16,000 m), meaning they could assist Nodes Point to prevent long-range bombardments of Spithead or Portsmouth Dockyard. By 1942, as the fear of German invasion waned, the battery was stood down from full-time night alerts. In 1943, a Coastal Defence(CD)/Chain Home Low(CHL) radar station was erected just to the east of Culver Battery.

== Post-war and decommissioning ==
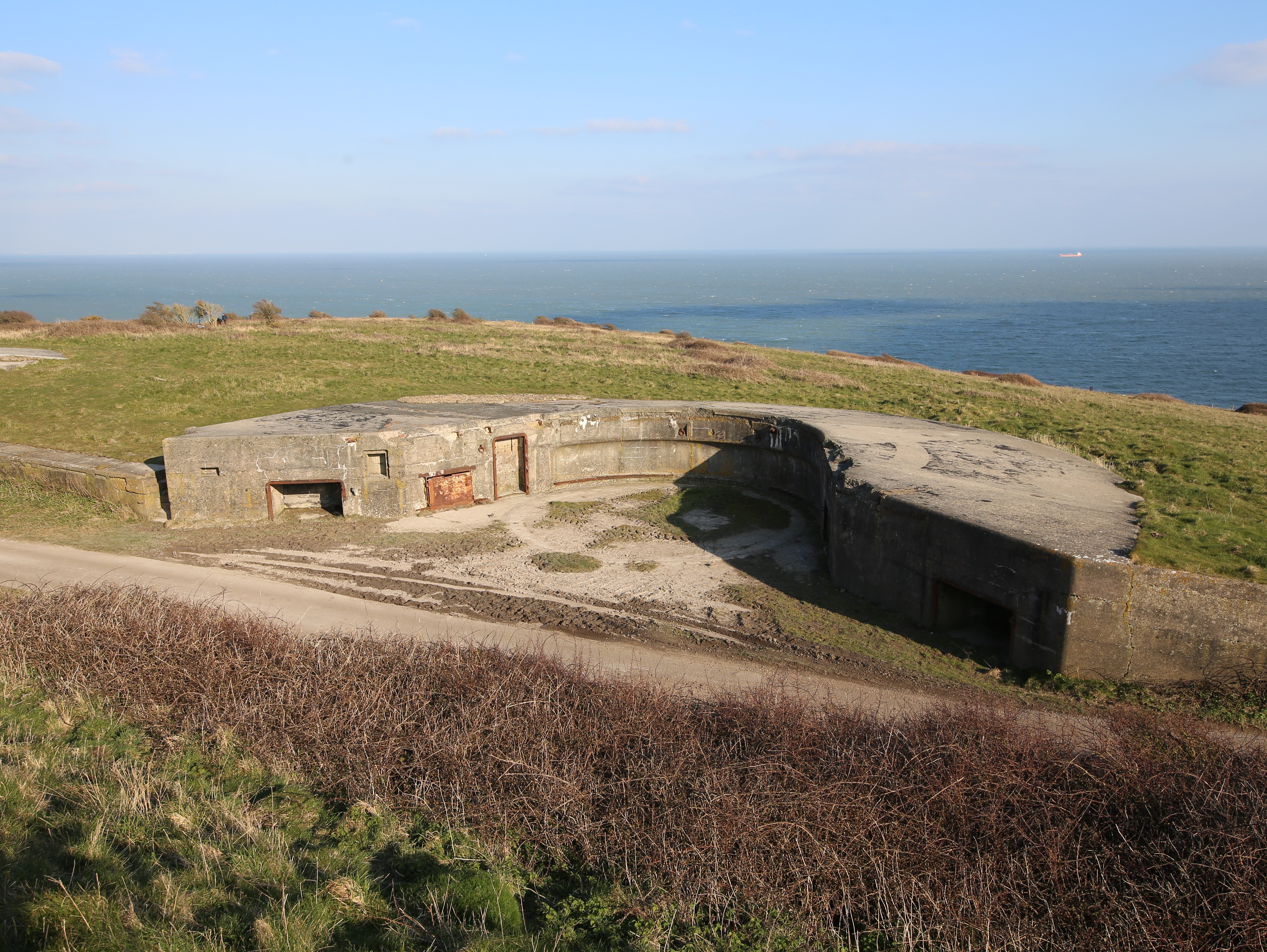
Remains of one of the 9.2-inch gun emplacements at Culver Battery in 2016.

In 1947 two BL 6 inch Mk 23 naval guns were erected in front of the 9.2-inch coastal guns for high-angle shooting tests. Two heavy-calibre 3.7-inch AA guns were also used for coast artillery practice.

In 1956, the battery was decommissioned by the Ministry of Defence. After the guns, the fire control centre, storerooms and domestic quarters were completely removed, the site was covered with earth. However, in 1966, the gun emplacements were re-excavated to make them more accessible. The battery is now a viewing point and public picnic area owned and operated by the National Trust.

== Publications ==
- Moore, David (2010). The East Wight Defences. Gosport: Solent Papers. ISBN 978-0954845339.
