= Bembridge Fort =

19th-century fort near Bembridge, Isle of Wight, England

- Bembridge Down, Isle of Wight, England
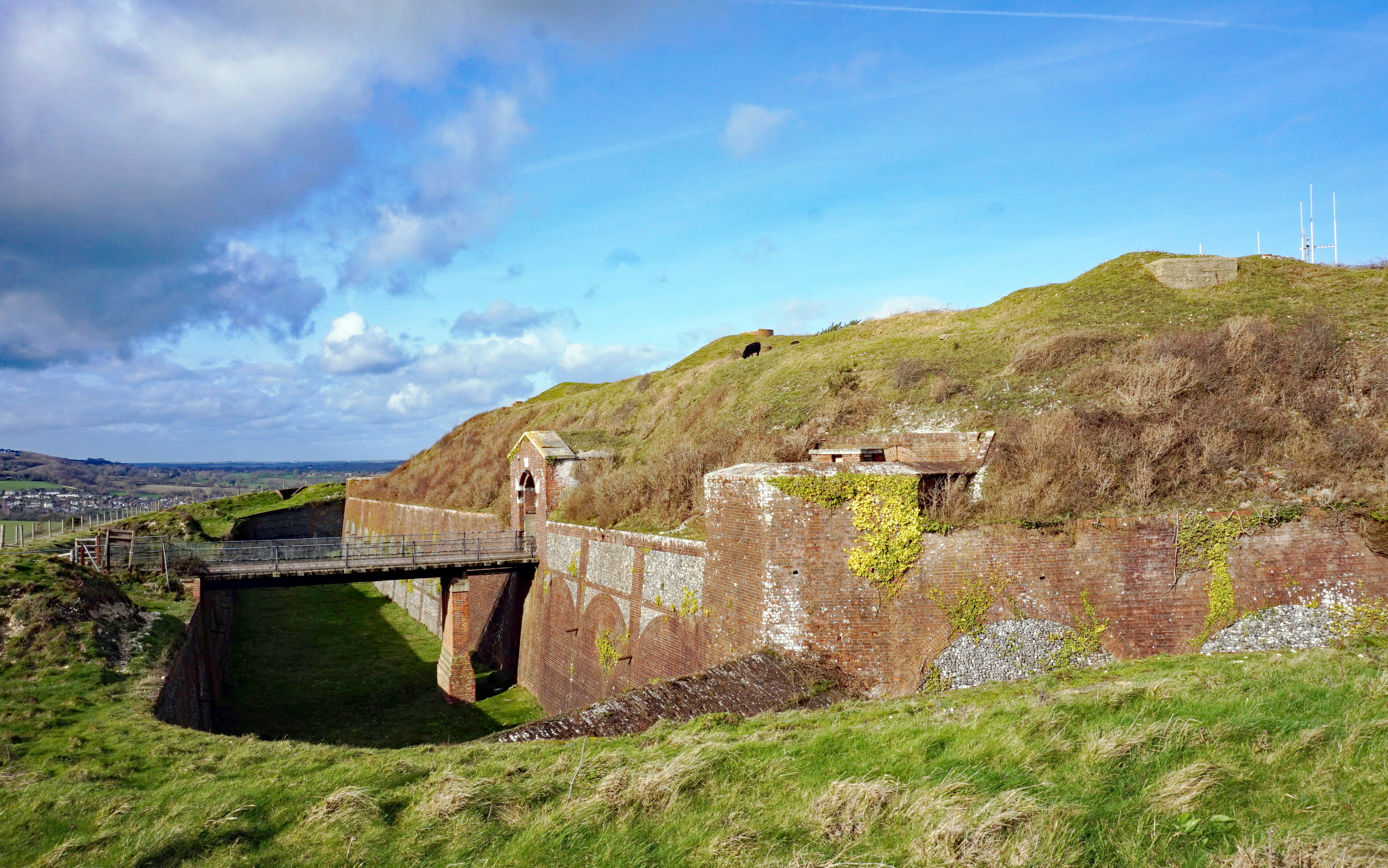
- Entrance to Bembridge Fort

Site information
- Owner: National Trust
- Open to the public: By Appointment

Scheduled monument
- Official name: Bembridge Fort
- Designated: 17 March 1964
- Reference no.: 1012717

Location
- Coordinates: 50°40′18″N 1°07′03″W

Site history
- Built: July 1867
- Built by: British Army
- Materials: Brick, Flint
- Battles/wars: World War I; World War II

Garrison information
- Garrison: 4 officers, 106 men

Bembridge Fort (map reference SZ624861) is a fort built on the highest point of Bembridge Down close to the village of Bembridge on the Isle of Wight, England. It is one of the many Palmerston Forts built around Portsmouth during the period of the Second French Empire, as a safeguard against a perceived threat of French invasion by Napoleon III.

== Description ==
The hexagonally shaped fort was the main stronghold for the south east coastline of the Isle of Wight and was designed as a final retreat if the island was to be invaded. Due to its location with a view over both Sandown Bay and the Eastern Solent it acted as the command and control centre for the Western batteries on the Isle of Wight: Redcliff Battery, Yaverland Battery, Sandown Fort and Sandown Barrack Battery. The fort had barrack accommodation for 4 officers and 106 men with an original armament of six RBL 7 inch Armstrong guns mounted on the parapet side.

== History ==
1860s: The Yarborough Monument was moved stone by stone from the summit of Bembridge Down to make way for the new fort.

1862–1867: Construction of the fort at a cost of £48,925.

1869: Guns mounted on the fort.

1871–1880: The fort changed hands frequently and was occupied by various military units while armed including: the 103rd Regiment (Royal Bombay Fusiliers), 7th Brigade Royal Artillery, 102nd Regiment (Royal Madras Fusiliers), 49th Regiment, 107th Regiment (Bengal Light Infantry) and then the 42nd Regiment (The Black Watch).

1880–1900: Experimental base for anti submarine and anti torpedo devices. Two heavily armoured cables ran from the fort to the sea to form an indicator loop which was used to detect any passing metal objects.

1892: Royal Artillery Office commanding the East Wight Defences was built.

1900–1914: Training camp and garrison duties.

1914–1920: A cavalry followed by a heavy artillery unit was stationed at the fort.

1920–1939: Territorial army observation post for artillery based at Yaverland Battery.

1938: Royal Navy's anti submarine division laid indicator loops across the channel into Spitbank Fort during the war three further harbour defence loops were laid and monitored from the fort.

1939–1945: Command post for anti-aircraft regiments and H.Q. for local home guard, two Allan Williams turrets were installed. The fort also housed a reserve radar station after the bombing of Ventnor radar station.

1948: The war department relinquished control.

1948–1965: The fort fell into disrepair and was heavily vandalised.

1965: Purchased by Isle of Wight County Council, becomes a Scheduled Ancient Monument.

1967: The fort was acquired by The National Trust as part of Project Neptune.

1968: The National Trust let the fort to a light engineering firm who occupied the site until 1998, due to its protected status the factory buildings were not permanently fixed to the fort. They still occupy an engineering workshop at the western end of the fort.

2005: A team of volunteers from the National Trust began clearing the debris from the fort. This work is still ongoing.

2024: Operation and Management of the entire fort was leased by the National Trust to the Bembridge Fort Trust who are undertaking a program to bring the site back into community use.

2025: The trust was awarded £250,000 by Heritage Lottery. The site is currently only open for pre-booked tours or advertised open events some of which are hosted in the unique main gun powder magazine now operating as a theatre.

== Publications ==
- Moore, David, 2010. The East Wight Defences, Solent Papers Number 10, David Moore, Gosport. ISBN 0954845331
