= Henry Addington (disambiguation) =

Henry Addington (1757–1844) was Prime Minister of the United Kingdom from 1801 to 1804.

Henry Addington may also refer to:

== People ==
- Henry Unwin Addington (1790–1870), his nephew; British diplomat and civil servant

== Ships ==
- Henry Addington (ship), a list of ships with the name
  - Henry Addington (1796 EIC ship), the first of two East Indiamen
  - Henry Addington (1800 EIC ship), the second of two East Indiamen

== See also ==
- Henry Addington Bruce (1874–1959), a.k.a. H. Addington Bruce, American journalist and author
