= Redcliff Battery =

- Culver Down, Isle of Wight, England
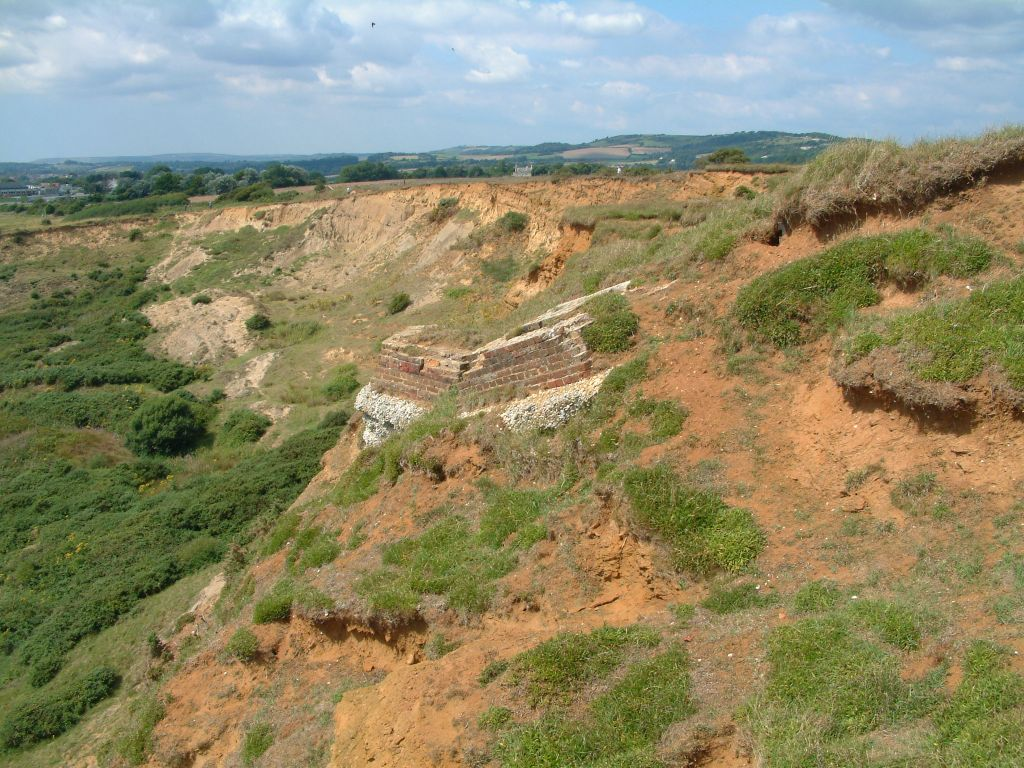
- All that remains of Redcliff Battery: A few pieces of concrete and bricks

Location
- Coordinates: 50°39′54″N 1°07′16″W

Site history
- Built: September 1863
- Materials: Concrete
- Demolished: 1891

Redcliff Battery (map reference SZ622854) is a battery located to the west of the Culver Cliffs and east of Yaverland on the Isle of Wight, England. It is one of the many Palmerston Forts built on the island to protect it in response to a perceived French invasion. Construction of the battery began in April 1861 and was complete by September 1863 at a cost of £4,776. Most of it has fallen into the sea. Only small amount left May 2020

== History ==
The Battery was constructed close to the cliff edge south of Yaverland Battery and west of Culver Battery and was designed to prevent a landing in the Sandown Bay area. It suffered with problems arising from subsidence shortly after it was completed and was in danger of collapsing over the cliff.

== Armament ==
The original armament was four 7-inch R.B.L. guns and it was decided in 1872 to replace them with four 64pr R.M.L. guns. In 1876 one 64pr was removed from the left flank of the battery and this position was replaced with an earth traverse to prevent enfilade fire from ships at anchor in the Culver Cliff area. The remaining 64pr guns were fitted to blocked-up traversing platforms firing over the parapet instead of through embrasures. Due to continuing subsidence of the cliff all armament was withdrawn from the battery by 1891 when the battery was abandoned. The battery was never replaced, its role being taken over by the battery at Culver Cliff.

Today nothing remains of the battery apart from a few pieces of concrete projecting from the cliff edge.

== Publications ==
- Moore, David, 2010. The East Wight Defences, Solent Papers Number 10, David Moore, Gosport. ISBN 0954845331
