= British NVC community SM1 =

UK plant community type

British NVC community SM1 (Zostera communities) is one of the salt-marsh communities in the British National Vegetation Classification system.

This community is found very widely around Britain's coastline. There are no subcommunities, although stands of this community can be ascribed to one of three types based on the species present.

== Community composition ==
The following constant species are found in this community, one in each type of stand:

- Eelgrass (Zostera marina)
- Narrow-leaved Eelgrass (Zostera angustifolia)
- Dwarf Eelgrass (Zostera noltei)

No rare species are associated with the community.

== Distribution ==
This community is found widely around most of Britain's coastline, although stands of Zostera noltei and Zostera angustifolia are absent from the English west coast. Stands of Zostera marina are particularly frequent in western Scotland.
