= White air =

White Air can refer to:

- White Air (extreme sports festival), an extreme sports festival held annually in Yaverland on the Isle of Wight
- White Airways, a charter airline based in Lisbon, Portugal
