= Henry Addington (ship) =

Four ships with the name Henry Addington, named for Henry Addington, Speaker of the House of Commons and Prime Minister of Britain (1801–1804), sailed in the Indian Ocean during the late 18th and early-19th centuries. Two served the British East India Company (EIC) as East Indiamen between 1796 and 1815, and two were country ships. At least two other, smaller vessels named Henry Addington sailed out of Britain. in the early 19th century.

East Indiamen

- Henry Addington (1796 EIC ship) was launched in 1796 and made one voyage to China for the EIC but was wrecked on Bembridge Ledge, Isle of Wight, as she was outward bound on the second.
- Henry Addington (1800 EIC ship) was launched in 1800, made seven voyages for the EIC to India and China, and was sold for breaking up in 1815. She was one of the vessels at the battle of Pulo Aura in 1804.

Country ships

- Henry Addington was a ship registered at Calcutta that in 1806 a French privateer captured off the coast of Sumatra. As a prize to the French privateer Manchot, she arrived at Port-Louis, Île de France on 27 August 1806, and carrying goods from China. She was copper sheathed, three-masted, and of about 350 tons (bm). Her captor sold her on 5 November; he also sold part of her cargo (13 cases of opium and 12 cases of saffron), on 30 November.
- Henry Addington was a vessel of 250 tons (bm), launched at Rangoon in 1802, that was captured on 17 May 1816 (captors unspecified).

Other ships

- Henry Addington, of 140 or 146 tons (bm), was launched at Yarmouth in 1802 and traded with the Baltic. On 2 January 1824 she was under the command of J. Martyn (or Martin), when she came into Margate much damaged having grounded, but gotten off, as she was sailing from Almeria to London. While still under Martin's command, she was reported to have been lost on around 19 December 1824 on the coast of Norway while returning from Riga.
- Henry Addington, of 129 tons (bm), was launched at Whitby in 1801 and traded with Jamaica. On 15 April 1804 she ran onshore at Barebush Key near Old Harbour, Jamaica. It was feared that she was lost.
