= British NVC community SM10 =

UK plant community type

British NVC community SM10 (Transitional low-marsh vegetation with Puccinellia maritima, annual Salicornia species and Suaeda maritima) is one of the salt-marsh communities in the British National Vegetation Classification system. This community is found in coastal areas in the Solway Firth, south Cumbria, Lancashire, west and south Wales, Hampshire, The Wash and north Lincolnshire. There are no subcommunities.

== Community composition ==
The following constant species are found in this community:

- Common Saltmarsh-grass (Puccinellia maritima)
- annual species of glasswort (Salicornia spp.)
- Annual Sea-blite (Suaeda maritima)

One rare species, Perennial Glasswort (Sarcocornia perennis), is also associated with the community.\
