= Shit Museum =

Museum of faeces in Italy

- Museo Della Merda
- Established: 5 May 2015
- Location: Castelbosco, Piacenza, Italy
- Coordinates: 45°00′N 9°33′E
- Architect: Luca Cipelletti
- Website: http://www.theshitmuseum.org/

The Shit Museum (Italian: Museo Della Merda) is a museum in the province of Piacenza, in the north of Italy, and is reported to be the world's first museum dedicated to feces. (Note: The "Japanese Poop Museum" within the Himeji Museum of Literature goes back to at least 2008. However, it is unclear whether this was an exhibit in a library or a true "museum".) The museum opened on 5 May 2015, having been founded by agricultural businessman Gianantonio Locatelli and three associates.

== History ==
The museum, set in a medieval castle in the village of Castelbosco, was created by a local dairy farmer whose herd of 2,500 (some reports say 3,500) cows produce 30,000 litres (7,900 US gal) of milk a day, which is used to make Grana Padano cheese. The cows also produce around 100,000 kilograms (220,000 lb) of dung, which is transformed into methane, fertiliser for the fields, as well as raw material for plaster and bricks. The dung is used to generate power to run the operation. The museum has a symbiotic relationship with the farm and cheesemaking facility. It is a byproduct of the huge aggregation of cows and their prodigious output of cow manure.

Eco-friendly recycling is an important theme of the museum. This includes the reuse of farmyard manure; however, the museum also features many artefacts on display, including a lump of fossilised dinosaur faeces, jars of faeces, art works inspired by human waste, (Note: "Other items made by Locatelli, in conjunction with architect Luca Cipelletti, are terracotta artifacts made from cow dung and clay, dubbed Merdacotta, which won a design award during Milan Design Week 2016. The pots, furniture, tableware and objets d'art are also featured in the museum, and are lighter and sturdier than industrially made terracotta items.") ancient Roman medicinal cures that featured animal excrement, and a collection of dung beetles.

An even broader motif (and goal) is "transformation" in an engineering, philosophical, scatological, sociological, and practical sense. As the organization's website offers: "The idea for a new museum slowly took shape, emerging from manure to deal with the broader theme of transformation. The museum would be an agent of change which, through educational and research activities, the production of objects of everyday use and the gathering of artefacts and stories concerning excrement in the modern world and throughout history, was to dismantle cultural norms and prejudices."

Transforming the site took more than twenty years. It started with paint. The museum commissioned artists David Tremlett and Anne and Patrick Poirier to transfigure the mechanical digesters "into a sign" mixing allegorical symbols with botany, thereby creating "a work of evolutionary land art". Luca Cipelletti was the principal architect.

Within the Gazzola Castelbosco, exhibit spaces are designed to reinforce the themes, beginning with the museum's repeated use of the dung beetle – the Egyptian's considered the scarab to be divine as a symbol of the heavenly cycle and of the idea of rebirth or regeneration – and to provide proof that shit "is a useful and living material". Thus, it combines historical references (including Pliny's Naturalis Historia) to point out that waste and recycled materials can be the basis for a better civilization.

Part of the mission of the Shit Museum is to make tangible contributions: ideas and exhibits are purposed to lead to objects, innovation and projects. Production is key to the transformation the museum's creators envision. In its inaugural year, the museum invented and patented Merdacotta, which it says is "emblematic". The product's name is 'baked shit' in Italian. The material combines the twin principles of sustainability and transmutation, which are the museum's baseline. It combines the twin materials of dried cow dung and Tuscan clay. The Merdacotta was used in "simple, clean rural shapes", devoid of adornment and embodying "ancient principles", thereby making the first tangible products bearing the Museo della Merda brand. These objects include bowls, flowerpots, jugs, mugs, plates, and tiles. In that sense, the use of materials gives voice to a Mcluhanesque view where "the medium is truly the message". By their existence, the materials used eloquently imply that the material is their substance, and that shape is peripheral. "These are objects that redesign the cycle of nature in a virtuous circle, constituting essential elements of contemporary living." At the Salone del Mobile in 2016, the museum's "primordial products" made their debut. They garnered first prize in the Milano Design Award. (Note: "Merdacotta is “a material which brings together the museum's principles of transformation and sustainability,” they write, to “turn shit into everyday objects and thoughts” and “essential elements of contemporary living.”) Merdacotta is said to have a rugged look that enhances the hand crafting. When glazed and fired at 1,800 degrees, it can be used to serve food and drink.

== Other museums ==
Sulabh International Museum of Toilets in Delhi, which antedates this museum, opening in 1992.

The National Poo Museum, which is ensconced within the Isle of Wight Zoo, features 20 examples of animal faeces, prepared by the Ecclestone George collective of artists and social entrepreneurs: Daniel Roberts, Nigel George, and Dave Badman. The specimens are desiccated and preserved in plexiglas. "The museum will feature relics such as freeze-dried poo, poop hanging from the ceiling and poop from various different species such as meerkats, foxes, cows, owls and even human babies." Poop is dried on a specially built machine. Viewers can illuminate each preserved exhibit at the touch of a button. It is said that this is "more of an exhibit" than a museum. The "exhibit" is scheduled to go on tour throughout the United Kingdom after its initial run in the spring and summer of 2016 at the Isle of Wight.

Another museum, called "Mr. Toilet House" or "a house to relieve one’s concerns" in Korean, a term for restrooms used in temples, is located in Suwon-si, South Korea. It was built in 2007 as a large house designed to mimic a very large commode.

There is a Japanese Unko Museum within the Himeji Museum of Literature. Among other exhibits, this being a library, it included "Excretory Literature", books on turds and related subjects.

The Pooseum is in Tasmania.
