= Steynewood Battery =

- Whitecliff Bay, Isle of Wight, England

Site information
- Open to the public: No

Location
- Coordinates: 50°40′42″N 1°05′39″W

Site history
- Built: 1893
- In use: Private residence

Steynewood Battery (map reference SZ641869) is a battery located between Bembridge and Whitecliff Bay on the Isle of Wight, England. It is one of the many Palmerston Forts built on the island to protect it in response to a perceived threat of French invasion. Construction of the battery began in 1889 and was completed by 1893.

== Publications ==
- Moore, David, 2010. The East Wight Defences, Solent Papers Number 10, David Moore, Gosport. ISBN 0954845331
