= National Poo Museum =

Museum on the Isle of Wight

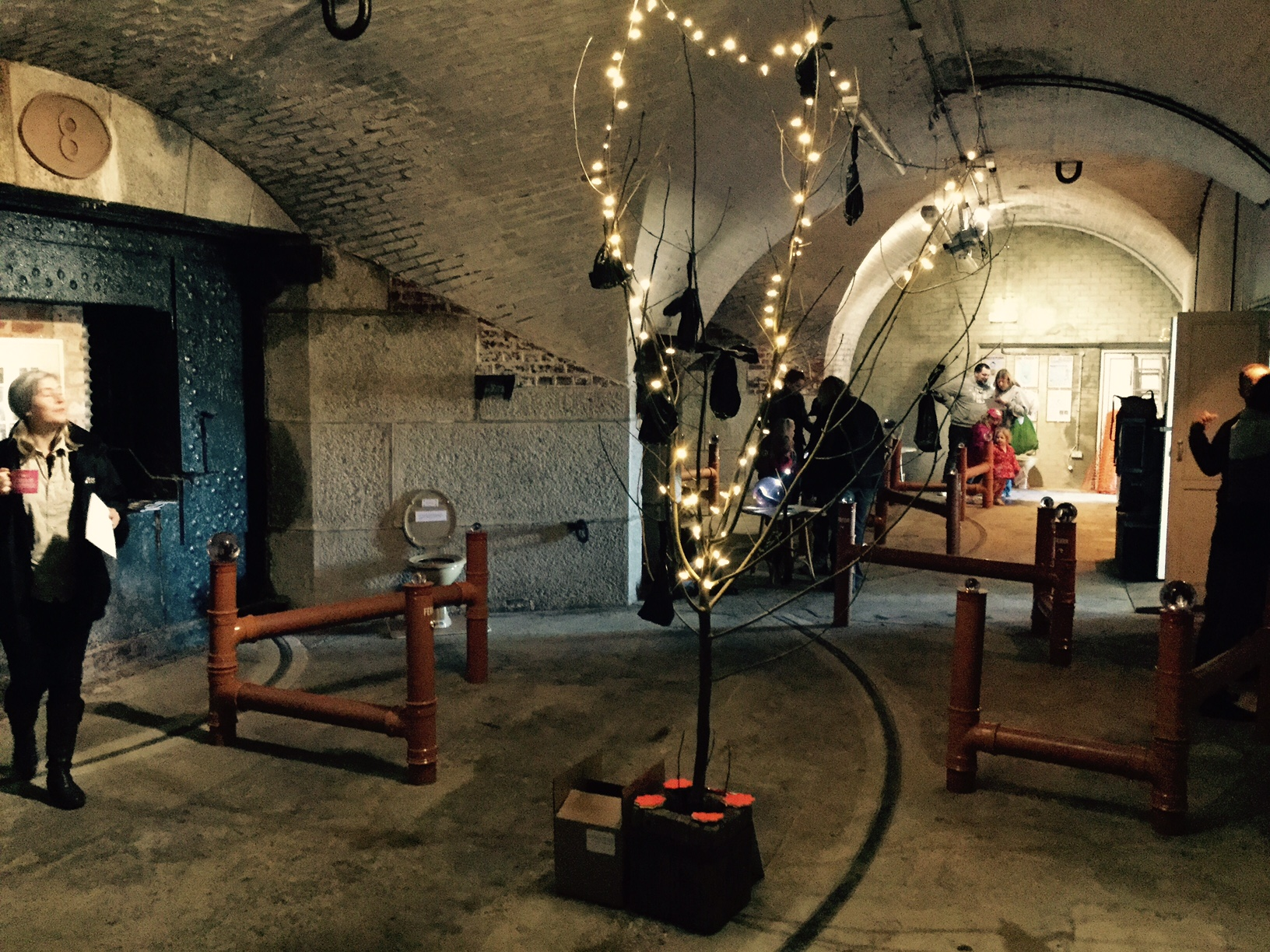
- A 'poo tree' at Sandown Zoo

- Location of Sandown Battery
- Established: 25 March 2016
- Location: Mobile, to be Sandown Barrack Battery, Isle of Wight, United Kingdom
- Coordinates: 50.650406°N 1.16045°W
- Founders: Daniel Roberts, Nigel George, Dave Badman
- Website: www.poomuseum.org

The National Poo Museum on the Isle of Wight, southern England, was a museum dedicated to the collection, conservation and display of feces. The museum, which opened on 25 March 2016, originally as a mobile museum, is now permanently located at Sandown Barrack Battery. In 2025, the museum went on a year-long road tour, and therefore was in hiatus at the normal location. It is not permanently closed.

== Overview ==
The faeces are displayed in resin spheres, where it can be viewed and held. The process involves drying the poo, which can take up to two weeks, before it is encapsulated and placed in a vacuum chamber, so that air bubbles are removed. The main aim of the museum is to break down the 'taboo' surrounding poo in human life, and the museum hopes to do this by receiving donations of poo from celebrities. The museum also aims to educate people about the issues related to poo including dog fouling and sanitation.

The museum was founded by members of Eccleston George who are "a collection of creative people who work together on many different kinds of projects", based on the Isle of Wight.

== Poo at the Zoo ==
The first public exhibition, named Poo at the Zoo, opened on 25 March 2016 at the Isle of Wight Zoo, where 20 excrements belonging to different animals were on display. The animals and faeces included:

- Lesser Madagascan Tenrec
- Tawny Owl
- Lion
- Meerkat
- Cow
- Fox
- Human baby
- 38 million-year-old poo
- A 140 million-year-old coprolite
- A poo with teeth and bones in it
- A poo that looks like a cereal bar
- A child's shoe which a cat has marked by pooing in it

The faeces came from animals at the zoo, faeces collected elsewhere and faeces donated by the Dinosaur Isle museum.

== Sandown Barrack Battery ==
Sandown Barrack Battery is a 19th-century fort built on the southwest coast of the Isle of Wight. The National Poo Museum is converting two of the derelict buildings at the battery in order to house exhibits permanently and build a cafe. This is being done with £15,000 from the local authority and a further £2,500 from a crowdfunding campaign.

== Reception ==
The crowdfunding campaign received money from 76 donors over 42 days. The campaign was supported by Kate Humble, the presenter of Curious Creatures - a nature quiz TV series on BBC Two. The series used faeces provided by the museum for a round called 'Whose poo?' where contestants guessed the animal which the faeces belonged to. Humble, a wildlife presenter, said that "The world would be a much poorer place without the National Poo Museum".

== See also ==
- Shit Museum
