= Salt-marsh communities in the British National Vegetation Classification system =

UK plant community type

This article gives an overview of the salt-marsh communities in the British National Vegetation Classification system.

== Introduction ==
The salt-marsh communities of the NVC were described in Volume 5 of British Plant Communities, first published in 2000, along with the other maritime communities (those of shingle strandline and sand-dunes and maritime cliffs) and vegetation of open habitats.

In total, 28 salt-marsh communities have been identified.

The salt-marsh communities consist of four separate subgroups:

- three eel-grass and tassel-weed communities of tidal flats, pools and ditches (SM1, SM2 and SM3)
- thirteen communities of the lower salt-marsh (SM4, SM5, SM6, SM7, SM8, SM9, SM10, SM11, SM12, SM13, SM14, SM15 and SM26)
- nine communities of the middle salt-marsh (SM16, SM17, SM18, SM19, SM20, SM21, SM22, SM23 and SM27)
- three communities of the upper salt-marsh (SM24, SM25 and SM28)

=== Other communities occurring on salt-marshes ===
There are a number of other communities which occur on salt-marshes, but are not classified as salt-marsh communities within the NVC. Those listed in British Plant Communities are as follows:

== List of salt-marsh communities ==
The following is a list of the communities that make up this category:

- SM1 Zostera communities Zosterion Christiansen 1934
- SM2 Ruppia maritima salt-marsh community Ruppietum maritimae Hocquette 1927
- SM3 Eleocharis parvula salt-marsh community Eleocharitetum parvulae (Preuss 1911/12) Gillner 1960
- SM4 Spartina maritima salt-marsh community Spartinetum maritimae (Emb. & Regn. 1926) Corillion 1953
- SM5 Spartina alterniflora salt-marsh community Spartinetum alterniflorae Corillion 1953
- SM6 Spartina anglica salt-marsh community Spartinetum townsendii (Tansley 1939) Corillion 1953
- SM7 Arthrocnemum perenne stands
- SM8 Annual Salicornia salt-marsh community Salicornietum europaeae Warming 1906
- SM9 Suaeda maritima salt-marsh community Suaedetum maritimae (Conrad 1935) Pignatti 1953
- SM10 Transitional low-marsh vegetation with Puccinellia maritima, annual Salicornia species and Suaeda maritima
- SM11 Aster tripolium var. discoideus salt-marsh community Asteretum tripolii Tansley 1939
- SM12 Rayed Aster tripolium on salt-marshes
- SM13 Puccinellia maritima salt-marsh community Puccinellietum maritimae (Warming 1906) Christiansen 1927
- SM14 Halimione portaculoides salt-marsh community Halimionetum portulacoidis (Kuhnholtz-Lordat 1927) Des Abbayes & Corillion 1949
- SM15 Juncus maritimus - Triglochin maritima salt-marsh community
- SM16 Festuca rubra salt-marsh community Juncetum gerardi Warming 1906
- SM17 Artemisia maritima salt-marsh community Artemisietum maritimae Hocquette 1927
- SM18 Juncus maritimus salt-marsh community
- SM19 Blysmus rufus salt-marsh community Blysmetum rufi (G.E. & G. Du Rietz 1925) Gillner 1960
- SM20 Eleocharis uniglumis salt-marsh community Eleocharitetum uniglumis Nordhagen 1923
- SM21 Suaeda vera - Limonium binervosum salt-marsh community
- SM22 Halimione portulacoides - Frankenia laevis salt-marsh community Limonio vulgaris - Frankenietum laevis Géhu & Géhu-Franck 1975
- SM23 Spergularia marina - Puccinellia distans salt-marsh community Puccinellietum distantis Feekes (1934) 1945
- SM24 Elymus pycnanthus salt-marsh community Atriplici-Elymetum pycnanthi Beeftink & Westhoff 1962
- SM25 Suaeda vera drift-line community Elymo pycnanthi - Suaedetum verae (Arènes 1933) Géhu 1975
- SM26 Inula crithmoides on salt-marshes
- SM27 Ephermeral salt-marsh vegetation with Sagina maritima Saginion maritimae Westhoff, van Leeuwen & Adriani 1962
- SM28 Elymus repens salt-marsh community Elymetum repentis maritimum Nordhagen 1940
