= Whitecliff Bay and Bembridge Ledges =

Site of Special Scientific Interest

- Site of Special Scientific Interest
- Location within Isle of Wight
- Location of Whitecliff Bay and Bembridge Ledges.
- Area of search: Isle of Wight
- Grid reference: SZ657872
- Coordinates: 50.674°N 1.105°W
- Interest: Biological and Geological
- Area: 131.6 ha (325 acres)
- Notification date: 1955
- Location map: Natural England

Whitecliff Bay and Bembridge Ledges is a 131.6-hectare (325-acre) Site of Special Scientific Interest that lies around the coastline of the easternmost part of the Isle of Wight from the Bembridge harbour entrance in the north around Foreland to Whitecliff Bay to the south. The site was notified in 1955 for both its biological and geological features.

== Geology ==
Whitecliff Bay and Bembridge Ledges is a Site of Special Scientific Interest consisting of a large area of rock, shingle, and sand beach and the sandy cliffs behind, on the eastern end of the Isle of Wight. The crumbling cliffs expose the rock sequence from the chalk layers to the Bembridge Marls and contain important fossils of mammals and plants. The layers were laid down from the Upper Paleocene to the Lower Oligocene and exhibit a nearly complete series of strata from this period, providing evidence of the strongly cyclical nature of sedimentation in this part of the Hampshire Basin. The Wittering Formation and the higher strata of the Bracklesham Group are well exposed in these cliffs, and they provide the type section of the Bracklesham Group.

The fossils from twenty-one species of mammal have been identified at Whitecliff Bay; the only other locality in Europe with mammal fauna from this period has a less diverse mammal range. There are also plant fossils, including a sequence of charophyte (freshwater green algae) fossils, which provide good material for correlation with other sites.

== Ecology ==
The site is of interest botanically, with a number of different habitats and a rich marine flora of algae. The cliff is actively eroding, and, on the newly exposed areas, pioneer species include the creeping bent, coltsfoot and bristly oxtongue. On more stable sections there is a rich calcareous flora with yellow-wort, restharrow, bird's-foot trefoil and wild carrot. Above this is scrub with blackthorn, hawthorn, gorse and bramble.

There are a variety of seaweeds in the intertidal and shallow subtidal zones on the foreshore. There are ten species of lobsters and crabs, and the limpet Patella aspera and the snake-locks anemone Anemonia sulcata are at the eastern limits of their ranges. The lagoons have beds of the seagrasses Zostera marina and Zostera angustifolia and have been invaded by the Japanese seaweed Sargassum muticum.
