= British NVC community SM24 =

UK plant community type

British NVC community SM24 (Elymus pycnanthus salt-marsh community) is one of the salt-marsh communities in the British National Vegetation Classification system.

This community is found in a number of coastal areas, but is not recorded from Scotland. There are no subcommunities.

== Community composition ==
The following constant species are found in this community:

- Sea Couch (Elymus pycnanthus)

No rare species are associated with the community.

== Distribution ==
This community is found primarily in four coastal areas: The Wash/north Norfolk, Essex/Suffolk, along the English South Coast, and in Northwest England, although in this latter area, stands are small. It is also recorded from the Bristol Channel, the Isle of Man and in northeast England.
