= White Air (extreme sports festival) =

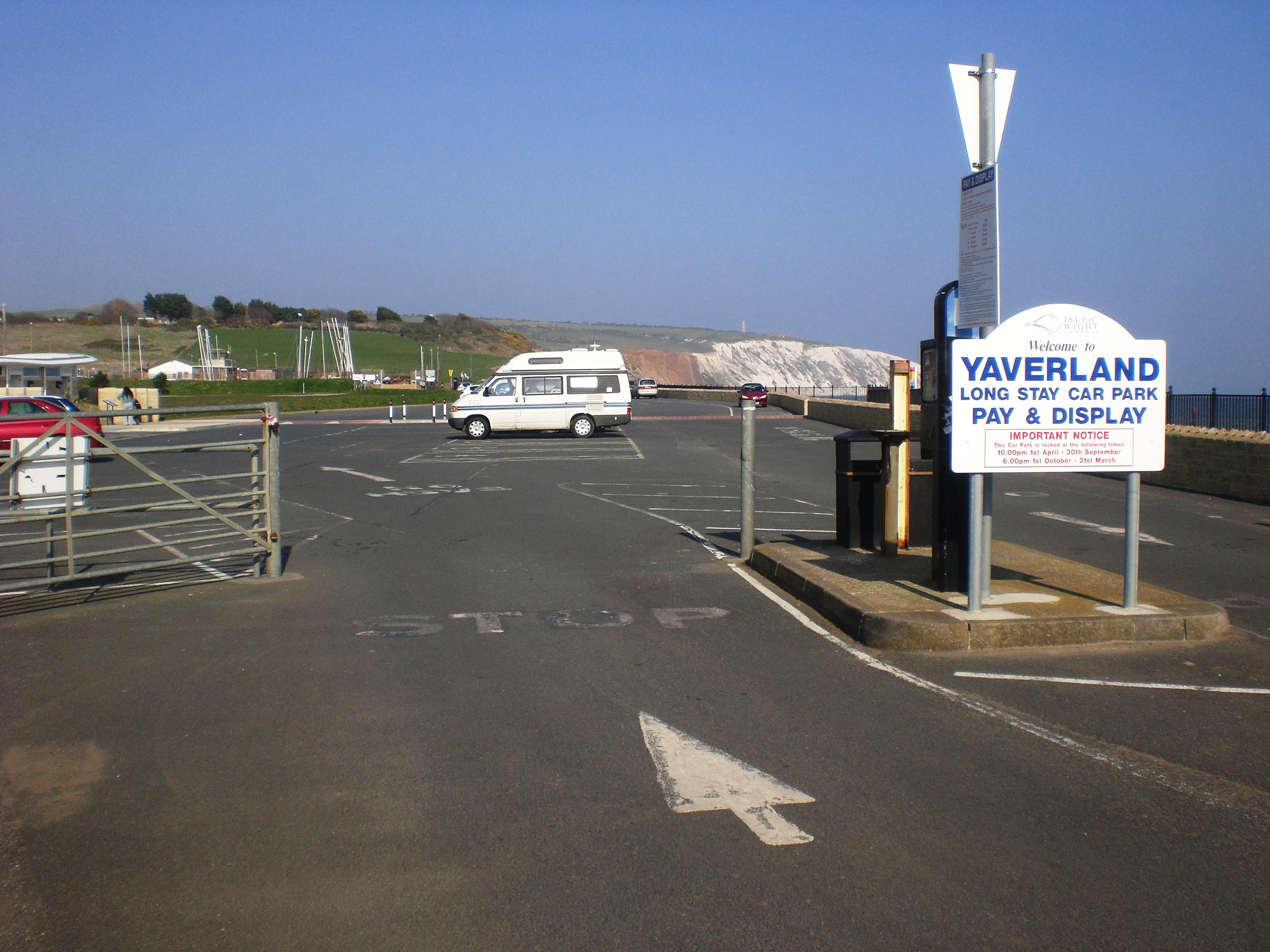
Yaverland Pay and Display car park, the site of White Air.

White Air is an extreme sports festival held annually on the Isle of Wight at Yaverland pay and display car park. The event usually takes place around September to October, although dates often vary. The 2008 event was a three-day event from 19 to 21 September. So far, the event has been running for 12 years but after recent festivals has suffered heavy criticism due to the close proximity to local houses, often putting the events future on its current site into question. Fresh rumours of a move to Brighton occurred shortly after the 2008 event which was later confirmed by festival organiser Nigel Howell.

Although it is now likely that the 2009 event will occur in Brighton, event organisers have not ruled out the possibility of it moving back to the island for 2010, if the Isle of Wight Council gives the event the support it needs.

== Criticism ==
Particularly in recent years the event has suffered heavy criticism by locals due to its close proximity to housing and the level of noise it produces. The 2007 event was moved from October, to a new slot in August, and extended to a week in length. This caused great criticism as money was lost from parking charges from the pay and display car park the event takes place in. To help solve this the dates were later changed for the 2008 festival to a three-day event in September.

However, later music taking place at the 2008 event again caused anger with local residents in Yaverland. Music was originally licensed to take place until 11pm on Saturday, but White Air organisers requested this be extended to 1am due to changes of entertainment provision at the site.
