= Henry Addington (1796 EIC ship) =

British Indiaman 1796–1798

History

Great Britain
- Name: Henry Addington
- Namesake: Henry Addington, 1st Viscount Sidmouth
- Owner: Sir Alexander Hamilton
- Builder: Wells, Deptford
- Launched: 10 March 1796
- Fate: Wrecked 9 December 1798

General characteristics
- Tons burthen: 1200, or 1432, or 14327/94, or 1477 (bm)
- Length: 176 ft 9 1/2 in (53.9 m) (overall), 144 ft 2 1/2 in (44.0 m) (keel)
- Beam: 43 ft 2 1/2 in (13.2 m)
- Depth of hold: 17 ft 6 in (5.3 m)
- Sail plan: Full-rigged ship
- Complement: 150
- Armament: 36 × 12& 9-pounder guns
- Notes: Three decks

Henry Addington was an East Indiaman in the service of the British East India Company (EIC). She made one voyage for the EIC and was only five days into her second when she wrecked in 1798 at the Isle of Wight.

== Only voyage (1796–1798) ==
Captain Richard Atherton Farington received a letter of marque on 4 May 1796. He sailed from Portsmouth on 27 June, bound for China. Henry Addington reached the Cape of Good Hope on 29 September and arrived at Whampoa Anchorage on 2 February 1797. On the homeward-bound leg, she was at Bally Town, which is slightly up river from Calcutta, on 14 September. She was at the Cape on 2 December, and arrived on 17 May 1798 at the Downs.

== Loss ==
Captain Thomas Wakefield received a letter of marque on 9 November 1798. On 4 December he sailed from the Downs, bound for Bombay and China. Only five days later, on 9 December, Henry Addington struck the Bembridge Ledge on the Isle of Wight, during a heavy fog. When the tide went out the next day she bilged. Five crew member drowned while trying to reach shore on a raft. Also, a block falling from the mizzen mast hit a boy on the head, killing him. By 16 December all that was left standing was the forepart of the vessel's upper works. Some casks were saved, but the EIC put the value of the cargo it lost at £29,222.
