= Yaverland =

Coordinates: 50.6630°N 1.1349°W

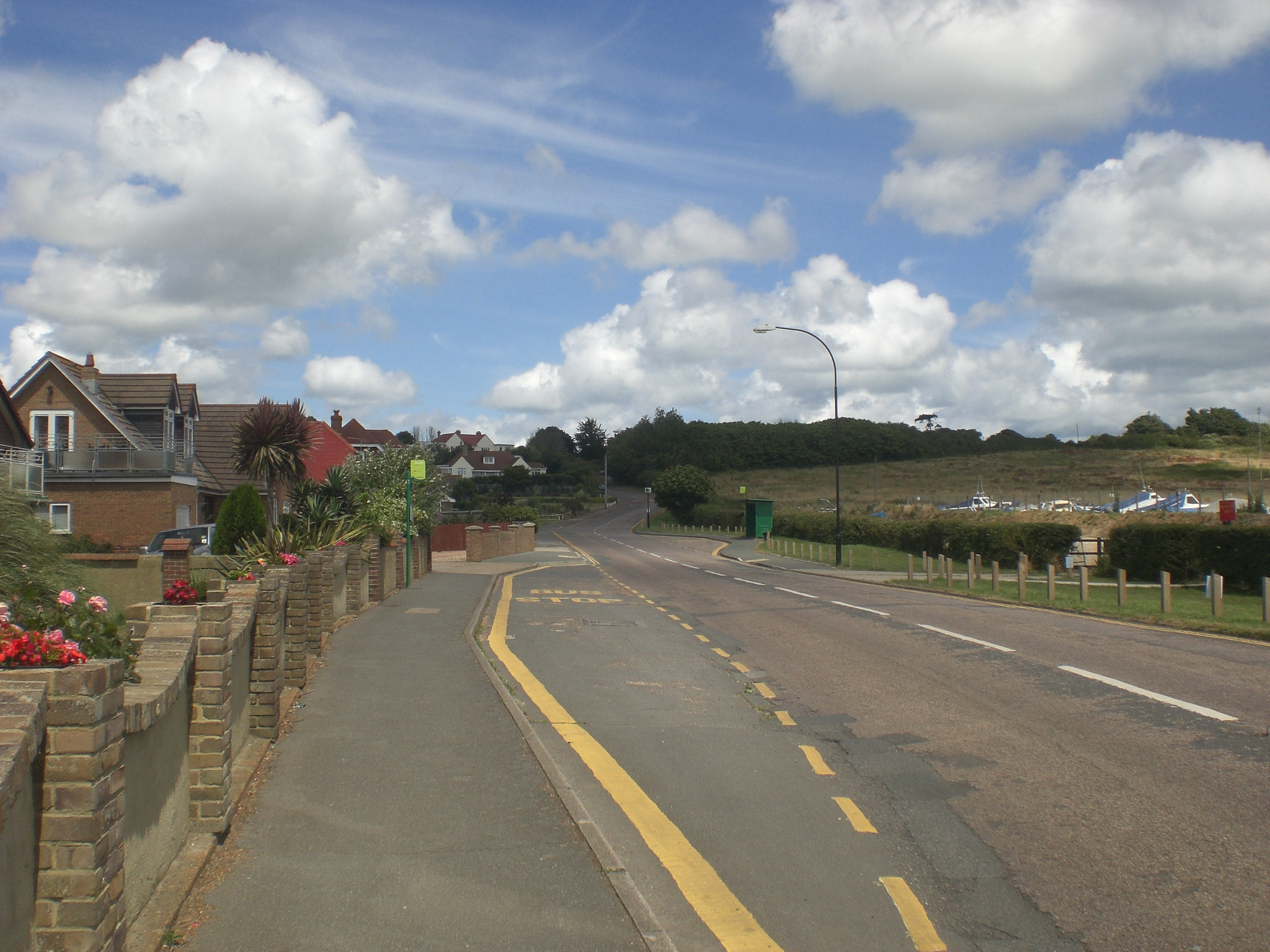
- The main road through the newer part of Yaverland

- Location within the Isle of Wight
- Civil parish: Sandown
- Unitary authority: Isle of Wight
- Shire county: Isle of Wight
- Region: South East
- Country: England
- Sovereign state: United Kingdom
- UK Parliament: Isle of Wight East

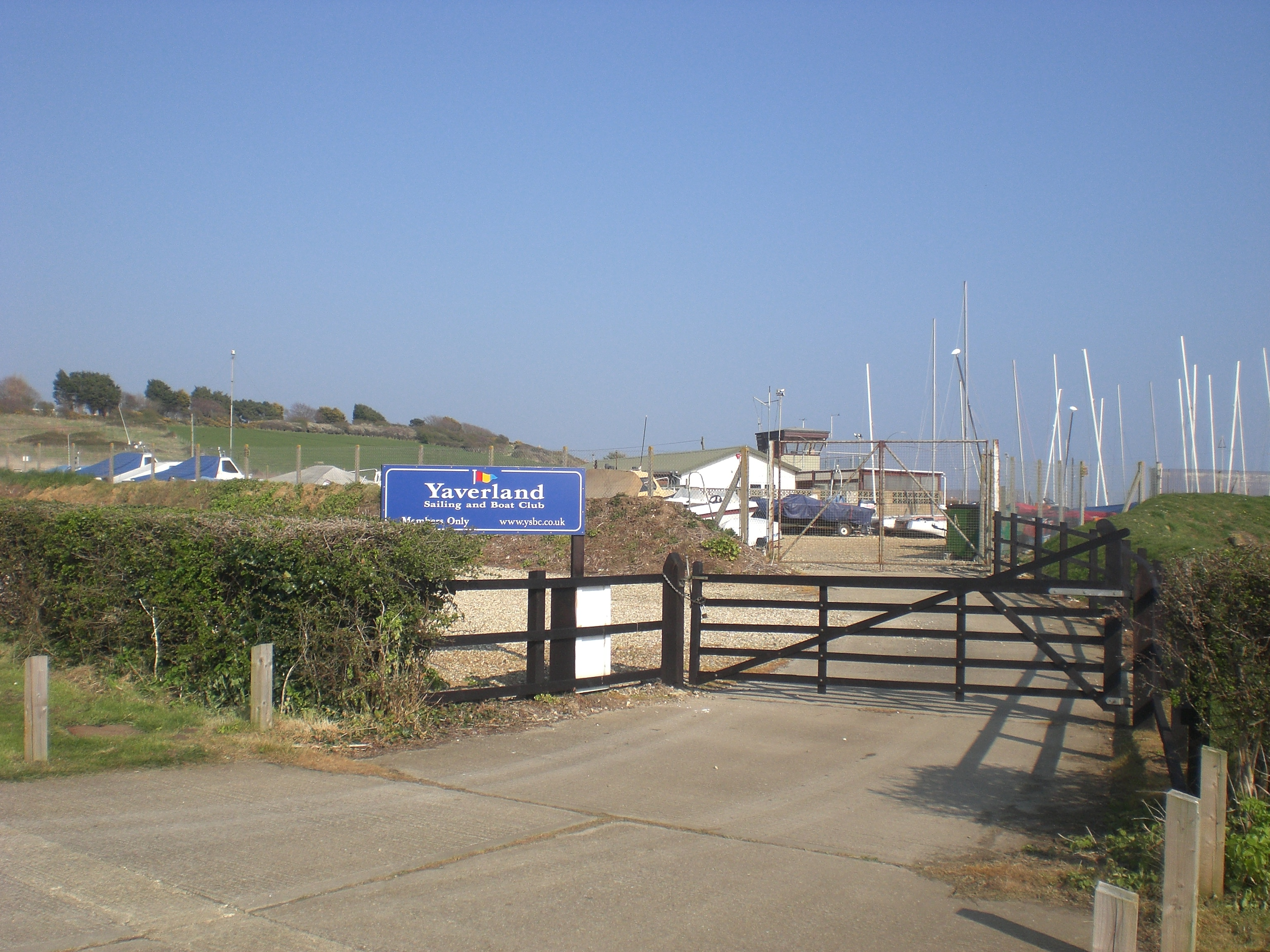
Yaverland Sailing and Boat Club

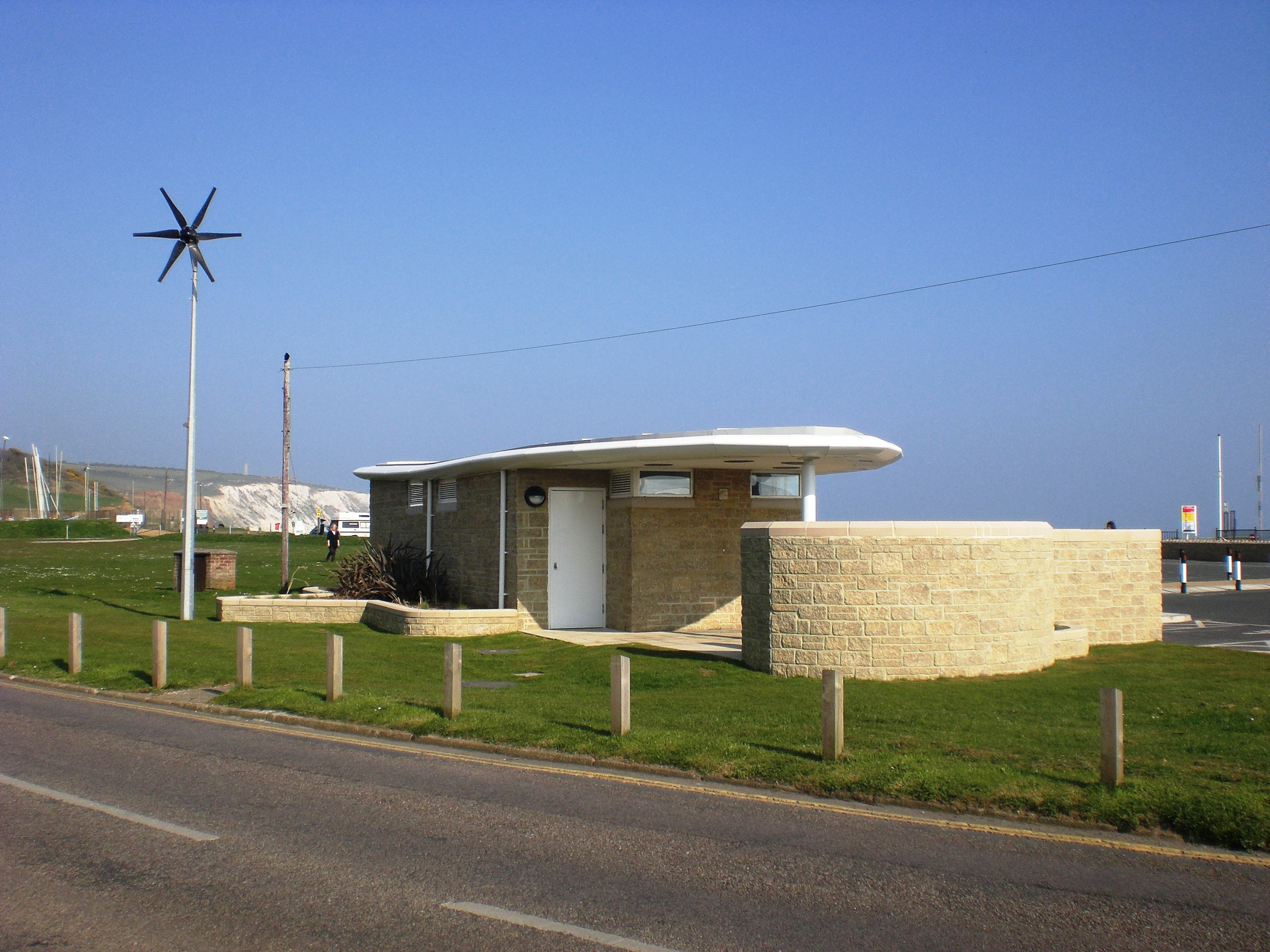
Yaverland eco toilets.

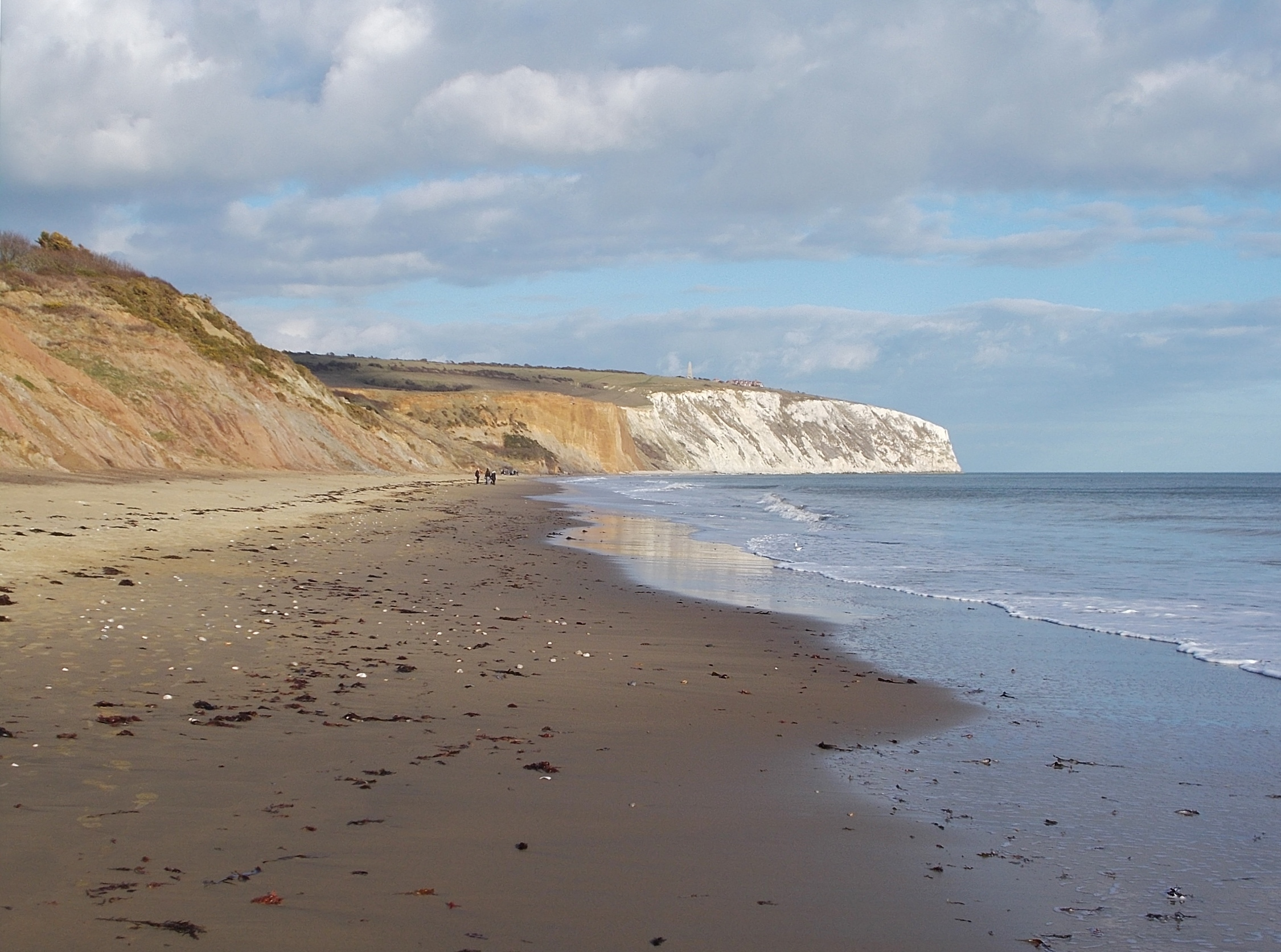
The beach at Yaverland, with Culver Cliff (white chalk) in the distance

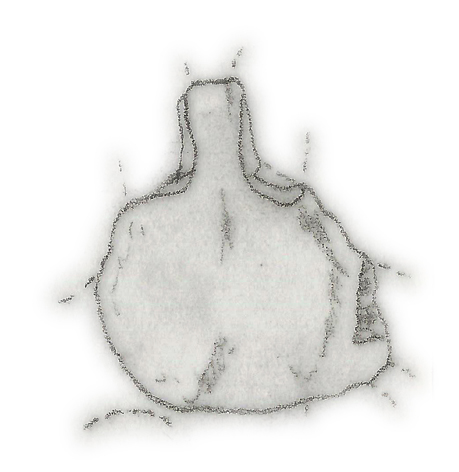
Yaverlandia skull, found in Yaverland

Yaverland is a village and former civil parish, now in the parish of Sandown, on the Isle of Wight, England. It is just north of Sandown on Sandown Bay. It has about 200 houses. About 1/3 of a mile away from the village is the Yaverland Manor and Church. Holotype fossils have been discovered here of Yaverlandia and a pterosaur, Caulkicephalus. The White Air extreme sports festival was held annually at Yaverland pay and display car park between 1997 and 2008, but moved to Brighton for 2009.

== Name ==
The name means 'the cultivated land or estate where boars are kept', from Old English eofor and land.

683: Ewerelande

1086: Evreland, Everelant

1189-1204: Iwerland

1291: Euerlonde

1324: Yaverlond

== History ==
The older part of the village is spread along the road to Bembridge by the Norman Church. The newer part is along the seafront, consisting entirely of a bungalow estate. The name appears to come from a local rendition of "over land" - being the land over the once-tidal causeway. An alternative derivation is from "Yar Island".

In the fields below Yaverland the archaeological television programme Time Team discovered a Roman smithy.

In 1545 a battle took place in Yaverland between French forces and local levies. The French were crossing Culver Down from their landing at Whitecliff Bay in order to attack Sandown Castle and link up with a force from Bonchurch. The French fought their way into Sandown but were defeated at Sandown Castle, then under construction in the sea.

== Amenities ==
The Isle of Wight Zoo is in Yaverland. The zoo is noted for its collection of rescued tigers. The zoo inhabits much of the converted buildings of the Granite Fort built by Lord Palmerston as a defense against the French in 1860. The grounds were used by the military during World War II as part of the Pluto pipeline to send oil under the English Channel to France to fuel the Allied war efforts.

By the sea is the Yaverland Sailing and Boat Club and along the seashore are fossil-bearing beds, which may be explored by guided walks from Dinosaur Isle. A holiday camp is located further north in the village, and was once the site of Yaverland Battery.

In November 2008, the Isle of Wight Council opened a new public toilet block which runs completely from renewable energy generated on-site. It is thought to be one of the "greenest" facilities in the UK.

== Transport ==
Southern Vectis bus route 8 links the village with the towns of Newport, Ryde, Bembridge and Sandown, including intermediate towns. Bus route 24 also links Yaverland around Culver Way to Sandown. The latter was formerly operated by Wightbus.

== Civil parish ==
In 1931 the parish had a population of 138. On 1 April 1933 the parish was abolished to form Sandown Shanklin; parts also went to Bembridge and Brading.

== See also ==
- St. John the Baptist Church, Yaverland
