= Zostera angustifolia =

Scientific classification
- Kingdom: Plantae
- Clade: Tracheophytes
- Clade: Angiosperms
- Clade: Monocots
- Order: Alismatales
- Family: Zosteraceae
- Genus: Zostera
- Species: Z. angustifolia

Binomial name
- Zostera angustifolia (Hornem.) Rchb.

Species of aquatic plant

Zostera angustifolia is a marine plant with creeping underground stems.

== Description ==
This species is similar to Zostera marina. Its leaves are narrower and are about 25 cm long and no more than 3 mm wide. The sheaths form a tube around the stem. The branched inflorescence is about 10 cm long.

== Ecology ==
Estuaries and muddy areas at mid-tide and lower.
