= Nodes Point Battery =

- Nodes Point, Isle of Wight, England
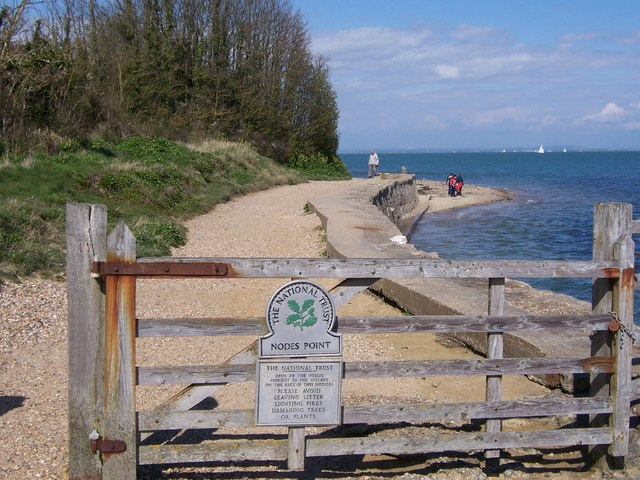
- Footpath along the shore to Nodes Point

Site information
- Open to the public: Yes

Location
- Coordinates: 50°42′16″N 1°06′08″W

Site history
- Built: 20 April 1904; 122 years ago
- In use: Nodes Point Holiday Park
- Materials: Concrete
- Demolished: 1956; 70 years ago

Nodes Point Battery (map reference SZ635898) is a battery located at Nodes Point on the Isle of Wight. It is one of the many Palmerston Forts built on the island to protect it in response to a perceived French invasion. Construction of the battery began on 16 August 1901 and was completed by 20 April 1904.

The battery was armed with two 9.2-inch Breech Loading guns and two 6-inch Mark VII Breech loading guns. By 1932 only the two 6-inch guns remained.

From 1949 the battery was used for Territorial Army Coast Artillery training. On the abolition of coast artillery in 1956 the fort was disarmed and the site sold. The remains of the site are now used as a holiday park.

== Publications ==
- Hogg, Ian V (1974). Coast Defences of England and Wales 1856-1956. David & Charles. ISBN 0-7153 6353-0.
- Moore, David, 2010. The East Wight Defences, Solent Papers Number 10, David Moore, Gosport. ISBN 0954845331
