= Sandown Barrack Battery =

Battery on the Isle of Wight

- Sandown Bay, Isle of Wight, England
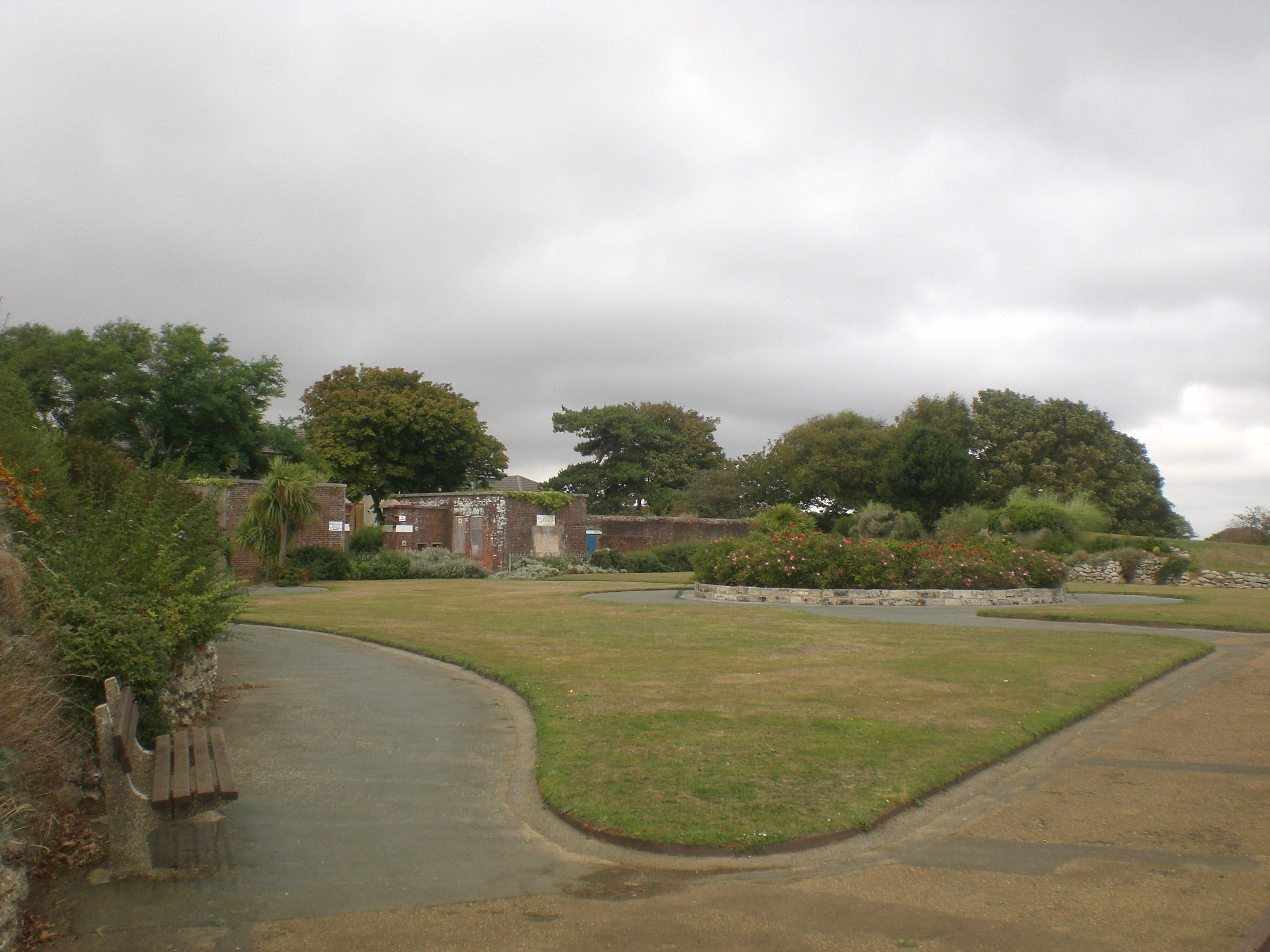
- The garden now on the site of the battery.

Site information
- Open to the public: Yes

Location
- Coordinates: 50°39′01″N 1°09′38″W

Site history
- Built: September 1863
- Materials: Concrete

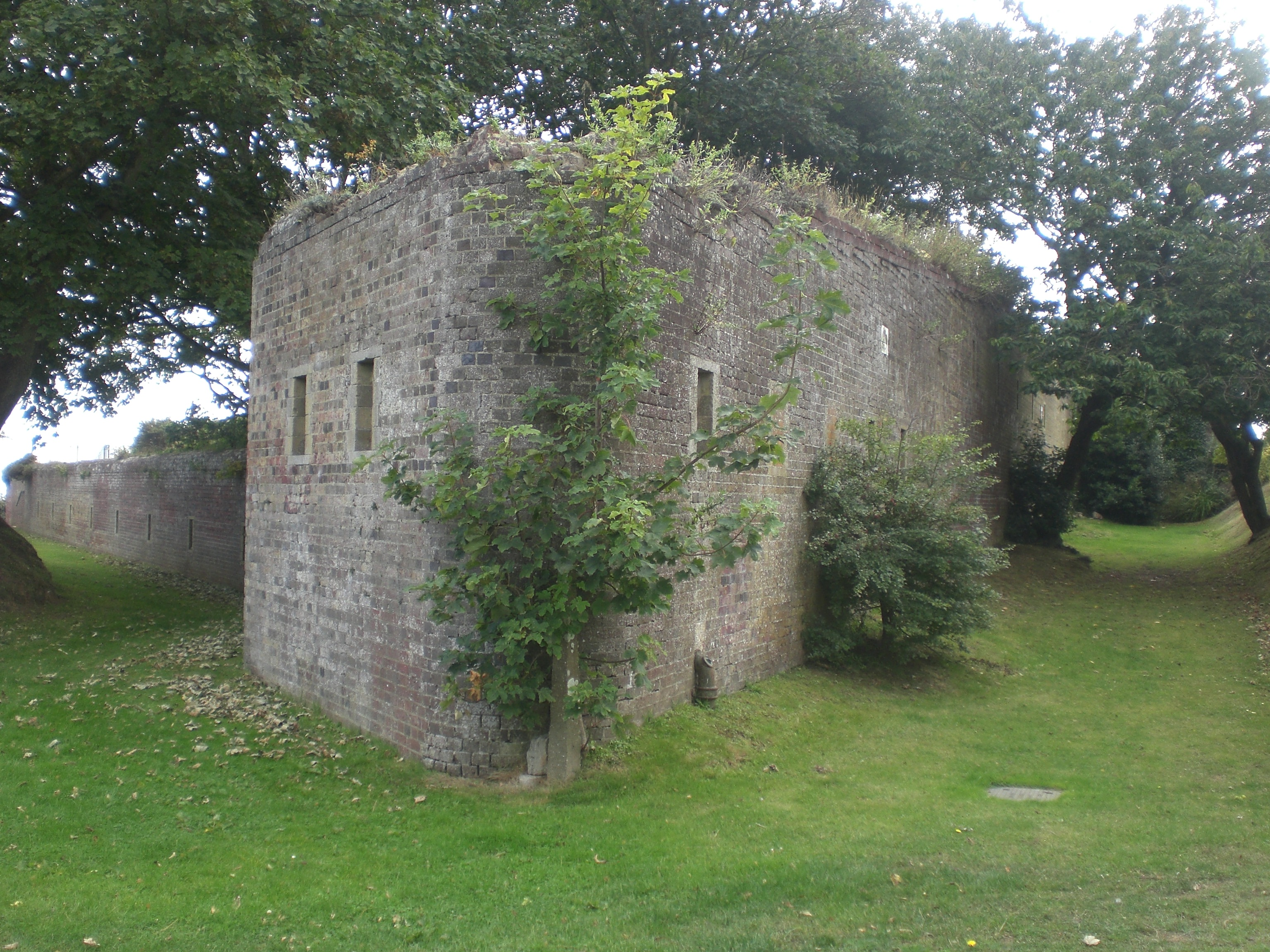
The southwestern corner of the Carnot wall protecting the battery from the landward side

Sandown Barrack Battery (map reference SZ594837) is a battery located in Sandown Bay close to Sandown on the Isle of Wight in England. It is one of the many Palmerston Forts built on the island to protect it in response to a perceived French invasion.

== Context ==
The 1859 Royal Commission on the Defence of the United Kingdom recommended improvements to coastal defences in response to a perceived greater threat of invasion due to the strengthening of the French Navy at that time. The fortifications, a total of 70 forts and batteries, were constructed around the English coast as a result of the commission's findings, representing the largest programme of coastal defence works since the time of Henry VIII. They form a distinctive group in terms of their design and armament. Their construction was very costly, causing the Chancellor of the Exchequer, Gladstone, to threaten resignation. They were known by critics as 'Palmerston's follies'.

== Construction ==
Construction took place from 1861 to 1863, costing £6,233. The battery is located atop a 140 ft (43 m) high cliff on the coast just southwest of Sandown. There were concerns raised at an early stage that erosion at the base of the cliff could affect the stability of the parapet wall. The battery was built to a rectangular plan with no wall along the cliff edge, but moats containing Carnot walls to either side and the rear of the battery.

== Armament ==
During its active history from 1863 to 1910, the battery had a variety of armament. The initial five RBL 7 inch Armstrong guns were replaced by five RML 64 pounder 64 cwt guns in 1873. By 1892 three of these guns had been replaced by a pair of RML 10 inch 18 ton guns set back from the cliff edge, after partial reconstruction of the battery. By 1902, after further works that included the construction of underground magazines, the battery had a pair of BL 6 inch Mk VII naval guns and a pair of QF 12 pounder 12 cwt naval guns. In 1905 the 12 pounders were taken out of active service, followed by the 6 inch guns in 1910. By 1926, all parts of the guns had been removed and the land had been sold to Sandown town council by 1930.

== Current status ==
The site of the battery now forms part of the Battery Gardens park. It was scheduled under the Ancient Monuments and Archaeological Areas Act 1979 on 7 September 2000.

In 2018, the former public toilets were converted to house the National Poo Museum. The Poo Museum vacated the property in 2025 to take its exhibits on the road.

== Publications ==
- Moore, David, 2010. The East Wight Defences, Solent Papers Number 10, David Moore, Gosport. ISBN 0954845331
