= Bembridge Down =

Protected area on the Isle of Wight

Coordinates: 50.668°N 1.112°W

- Site of Special Scientific Interest
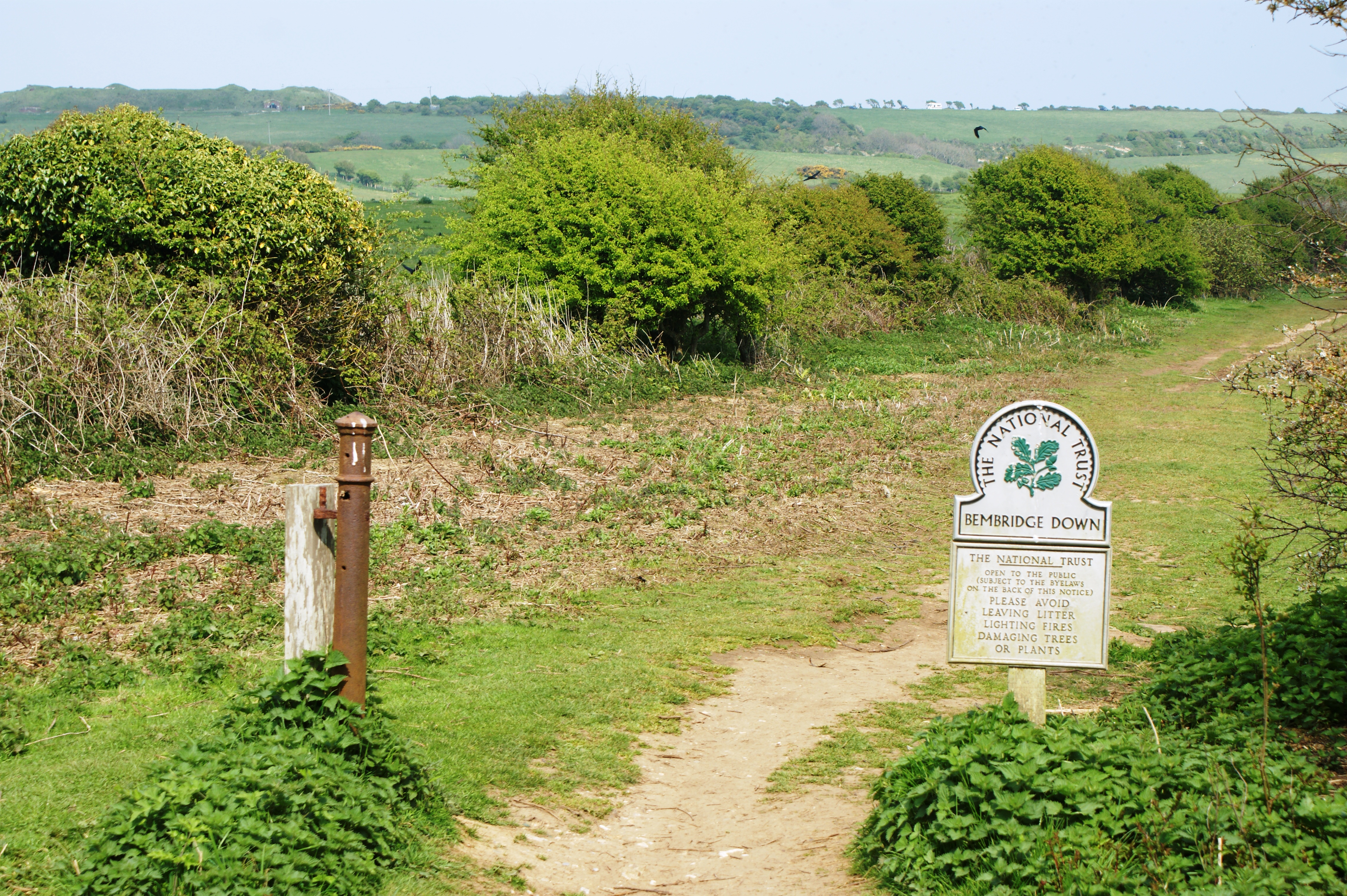
- Location of Bembridge Down.
- Area of search: Isle of Wight
- Grid reference: SZ628856
- Interest: Biological and Geological
- Area: 56.3 ha (139 acres)
- Notification date: 1951
- Location map: Natural England

Bembridge Down is a 56.3-hectare (139-acre) Site of special scientific interest which is north-east of Sandown, Isle of Wight, England. The site was notified in 1951 for both its biological and geological features.

== Biology ==
Plant species in the cliff top grassland include bee orchid, pyramidal orchid, early gentian and yellow horned poppy. Portland spurge (Euphorbia portlandica) is found on the cliff face.

== Geology ==
At the Red Cliff, Yaverland there are exposures from the Wealden Group of the Cretaceous period. Red Cliff is an important source of dinosaur fossils.

Chalk cliffs at Whitecliff show an important stratigraphic sequence including the Coniacian, Santonian and Campanian stages of the Cretaceous period.

== Land ownership ==
The Culver Cliff headland is owned by the National Trust. Much of the rest of the protected area is owned by the local authority.
