= Culver Down =

Natural feature in Isle of Wight, England

Coordinates: 50.66666°N 1.10851°W

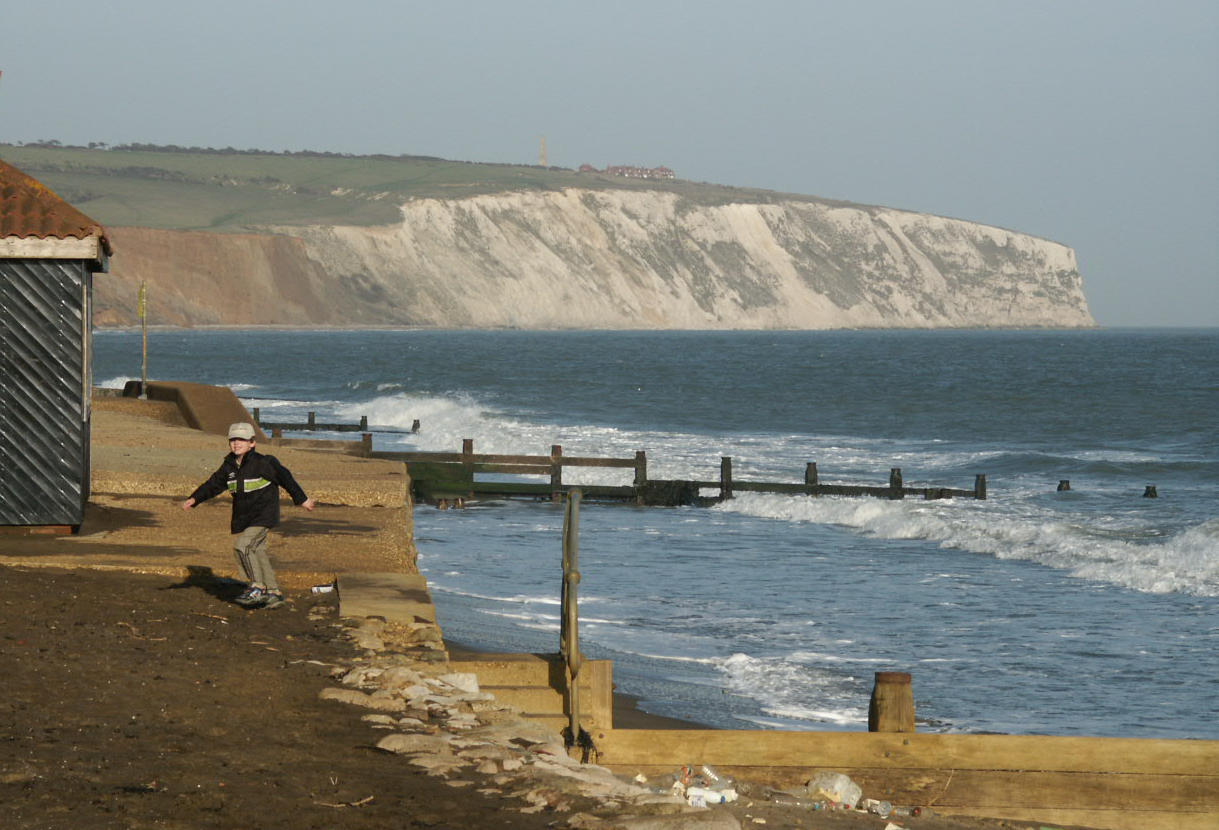
- Culver Down seen from Sandown Bay, 2003

Highest point
- Elevation: 104 m (341 ft)

Geography
- Location: Isle of Wight, England
- OS grid: SZ631856
- Topo map: OS Landranger 196

Culver Down is a chalk down to the north of Sandown, Isle of Wight. It is the easternmost point of the Island.

== Name ==
The name means '(the cliffs and downland frequented by) doves', from Old English culfre. There was a theory that it was from Old English cofa 'a cove', but this is incorrect.

== Geography and wildlife ==
The down has a typical chalk downland wildlife on the uncultivated areas (generally the southern and eastern slopes). This includes plants such as Small Scabious, Harebell, Cowslip and Lady's Bedstraw. The chalk cliffs to the north and east are important nesting places for seabirds. Historically, Culver has been the source of commercial bird's egg collecting from ropes over the cliff. It was also known for breeding peregrine falcons, as well as breeding Common Woodpigeons (Culvers), the source of the cliff's name.

The northern side is intensively grazed by cattle, so fertilisation and poaching of the soil, not to mention a spell as an artillery training ground, have all but eliminated the natural chalk ecosystem.

On Culver Down a number of unusual ant species live, including the semi-myrmecophilous Solenopsis fugax (Latr.), a thief ant which was recorded there several times by Horace Donisthorpe. The ant Ponera coarctata has also been taken from this location.

== History ==
The public parts of this prominent headland are owned and managed by the National Trust, and afford views of the English Channel.

For many years the whole site was a military zone and not open to the public. There are several historic military features on the down, a number of private dwellings, the Culver Haven pub, and the very visible Monument. The military barracks which once adjoined the monument has been almost completely erased, but there is a substantial fort, now under the ownership of the National Trust and occasionally opened to the public. Part of the fort is leased to Micronair, manufacturing crop-spraying and military equipment. It is a Palmerston Fort, constructed in the 1860s. At the end of the cliff is a coastal and anti-aircraft battery from the Second World War.

In 1545 a French force was intercepted crossing from its beachhead at Whitecliff Bay to attack Sandown by local levies under Sir John Oglander and a skirmish fought on the Down. The French were finally repulsed at Sandown.

The poet Algernon Charles Swinburne said in a letter that he had climbed the cliffs at 17, in order to prove his manhood to his family after they refused to let him join the army.

There is a legend that a 14th-century hermit lived at the end of the cliffs in a cave, in a structure then known as Culver Ness. He is said to have predicted that the well at Wolverton would be poisoned. When a pilgrim from Jerusalem came to bless the well, the vigilant and pious villagers are said to have murdered him. Shortly after, the French sacked the village and since then it has been lost beneath the trees of Centurion's Copse. They were repulsed from further mischief by Sir Theobald Russell. There was subsequently a great storm which destroyed the Ness and drowned the hermit. This was held to be divine retribution.

== Suicides from Culver Down ==
There have been a number of reported suicides from Culver Down generally involving a vehicle being driven over the cliff. Measures to make the cliff edge less accessible to vehicles have been put in place but such incidents continue to occur.

On 11 October 2012, Robert Hayball of Newport also drove his van over the cliff, resulting in his death.

== The Yarborough Monument ==
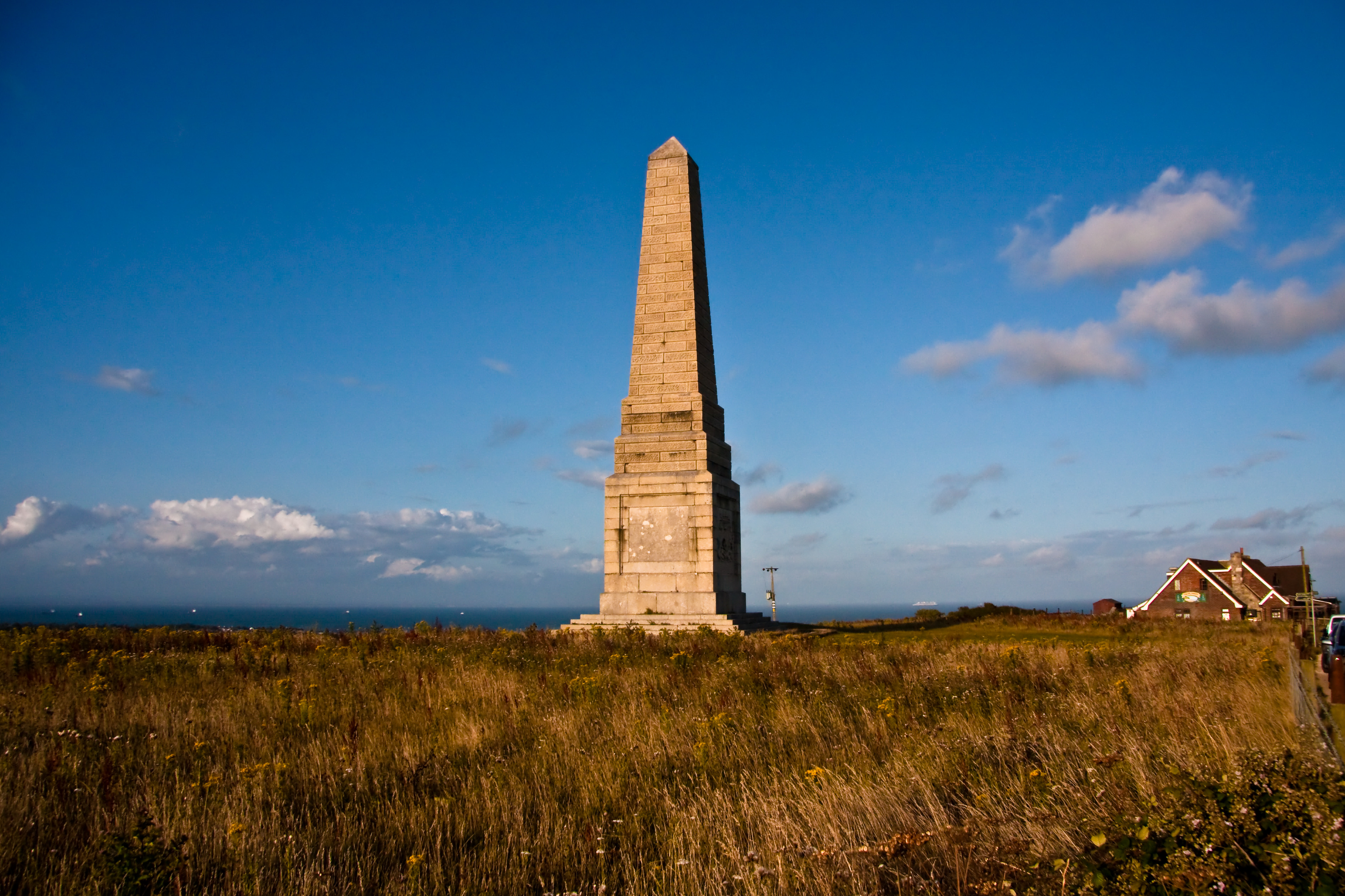
Yarborough Monument

The monument is a memorial to Charles Anderson-Pelham, the 2nd Baron Yarborough (later first Earl of Yarborough and also Baron Worsley), founder of the Royal Yacht Squadron at Cowes. It was originally erected in 1849 on the highest point of Bembridge Down, 3/4 mile to the west, and was moved to its present position in the 1860s when its former site was used for the construction of one of the Palmerston forts.
