= Whitecliff Bay =

Coordinates: 50°40′12″N 1°05′49″W

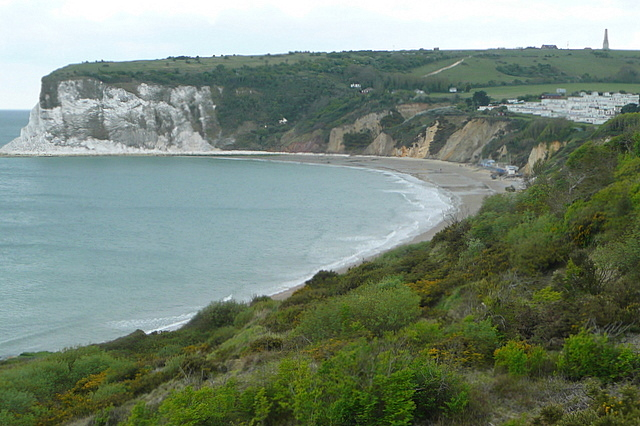
- Whitecliff Bay

- Location within the Isle of Wight
- Civil parish: Bembridge
- Ceremonial county: Isle of Wight
- Region: South East
- Country: England
- Sovereign state: United Kingdom
- Post town: BEMBRIDGE
- Postcode district: PO35
- Dialling code: 01983
- UK Parliament: Isle of Wight East

Whitecliff Bay is a sandy bay near Foreland which is the easternmost point of the Isle of Wight, England, about two miles south-west of Bembridge and just to the north of Culver Down. The bay has a shoreline of around three-quarters of a mile (1.2 km) and has a popular sandy shingle beach which is over half a mile long. It is a tourist site with three holiday parks in the vicinity of the bay; it has two cafes though minimal facilities. Access is limited and only possible down two steeply sloping concrete tracks.

The site is of major geological interest, being part of the Whitecliff Bay And Bembridge Ledges SSSI.

== Geology ==
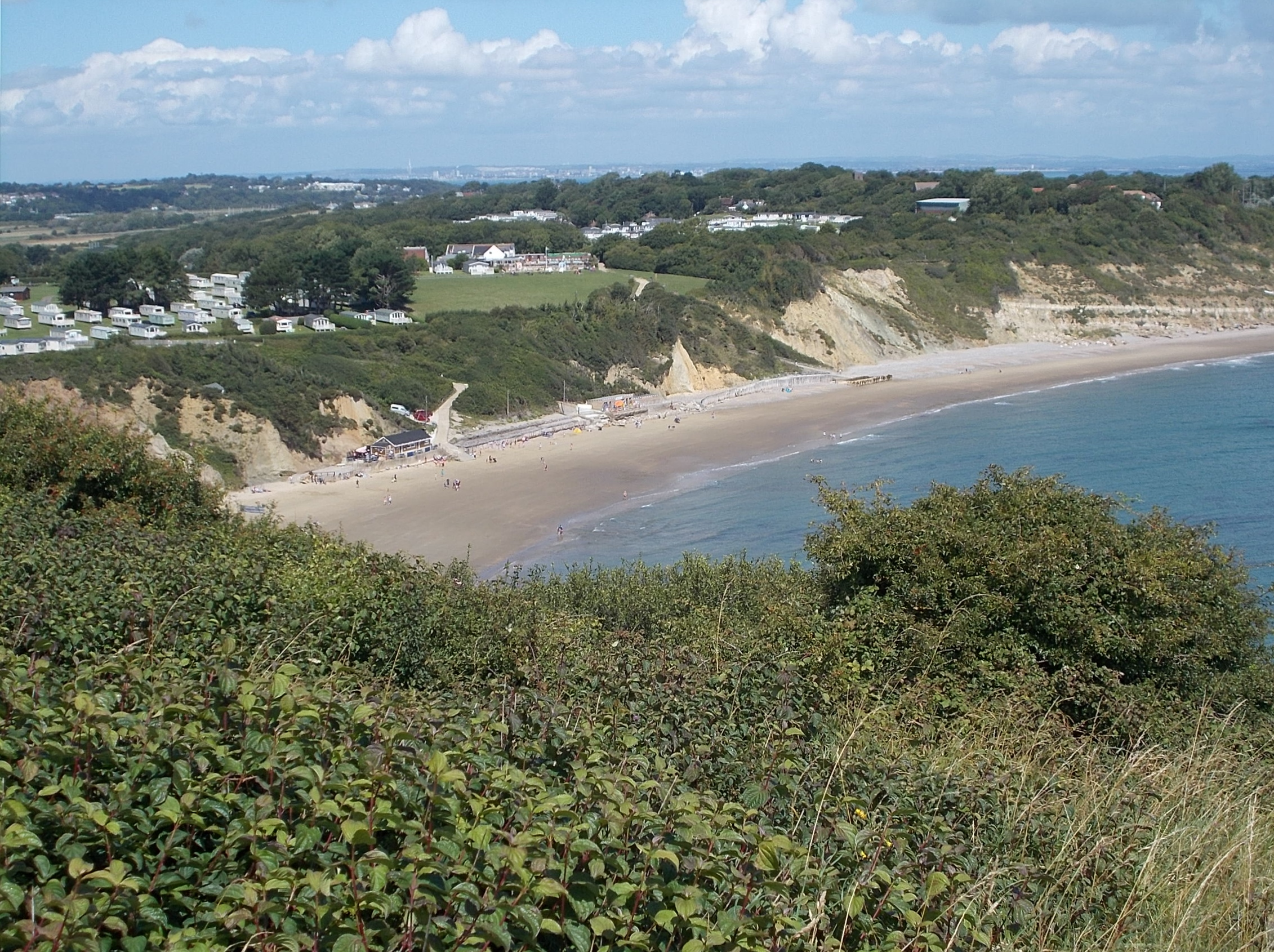
View of the bay from Culver Down

Whitecliff Bay has nearly identical geology to the lesser known Alum Bay, being a coastal section of the same strata which run east–west across the island. It displays a classic sequence of fossil-bearing Eocene beds of soft sands and clays, separated by an unconformity from the underlying Cretaceous Chalk Formation forming the headland of Culver Down to its south. Due to geological folding of the Alpine orogeny, the strata in the main section of the Bay are vertical, with younger rocks to the north. In the bay, there are around 500 metres (1,600 ft) of well-exposed sands and of late Palaeocene to late Eocene clays which make the site is a good spot for fossil hunting, with an abundance of prehistoric shells, sponges and molluscs. The bay itself is shallow up to around 350 metres (1,150 ft) from shore getting to deep water 1/2 nautical mile (0.6 mi; 0.9 km) out.

== History ==
Whitecliff Bay was one of the landing points for the French invasion of the Isle of Wight (1545) where they planned to go on to attack Sandown. The bay gets its name from the chalky cliff on the headland, Culver Down, which rises over 340 feet (104 m) at the south-eastern point of the bay.
