= Yaverland Battery =

- Yaverland, Isle of Wight, England
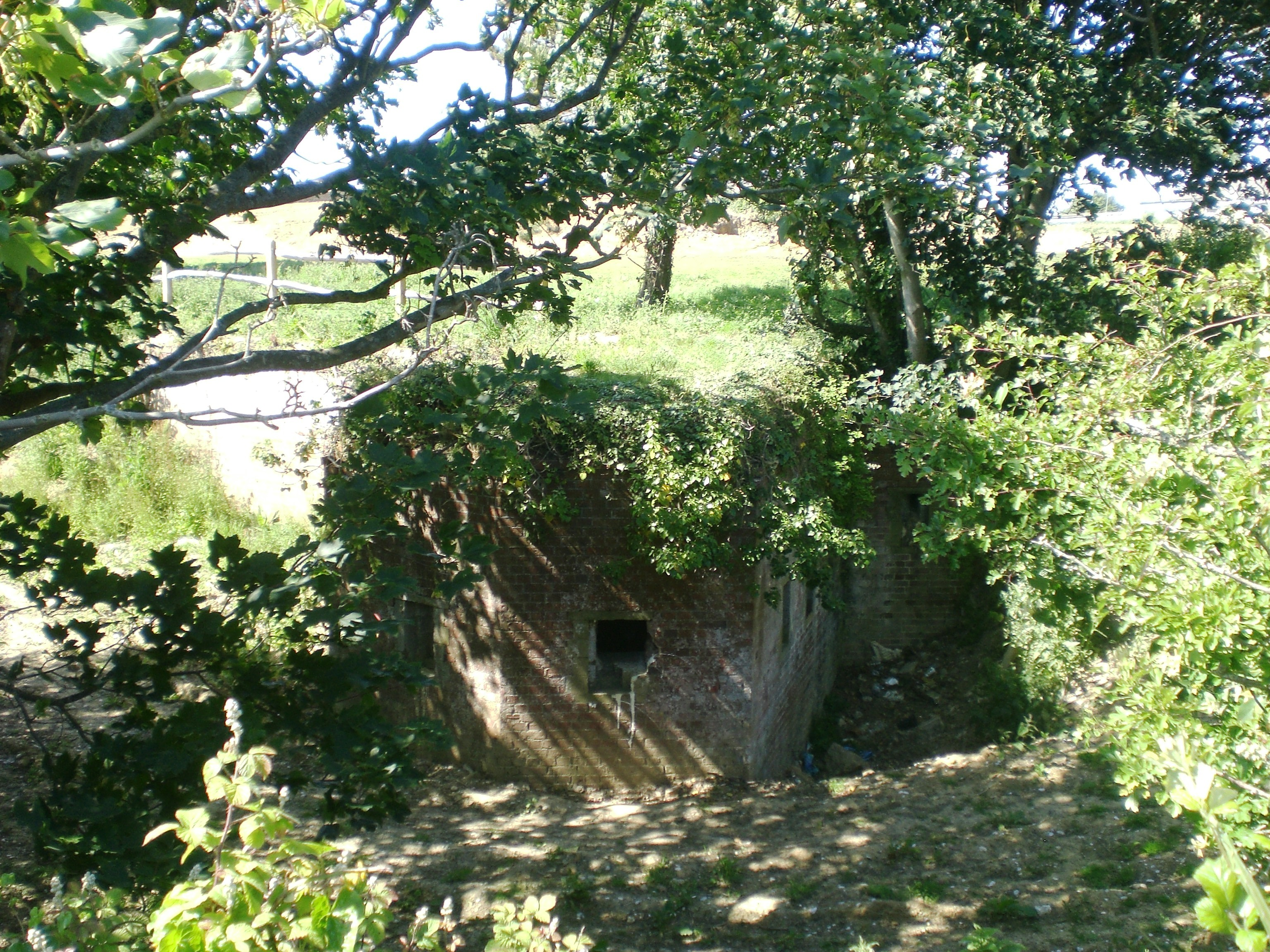
- Overgrown section of Yaverland Battery

Site information
- Owner: Private residence
- Open to the public: No
- Condition: Part extant

Location
- Coordinates: 50°39′50″N 1°07′50″W

Site history
- Built: 1861-1864
- In use: 1864-1956
- Materials: Brick, Concrete, Earth

Yaverland Battery is a battery on the Isle of Wight, United Kingdom. It was constructed between 1861 and 1864.

It originally mounted eight 7-inch Armstrong Rifled Breech Loading (RBL) guns, and enclosed with a Carnot wall. A rear surrounding wall included a small barrack block for two officers and 57 men. By 1886 the original guns had been replaced by eight 64-Pounder Rifled Muzzle Loading guns. Between 1898 and 1900 the battery was re-modelled to mount three 6-inch Mk VII Breech Loading guns.

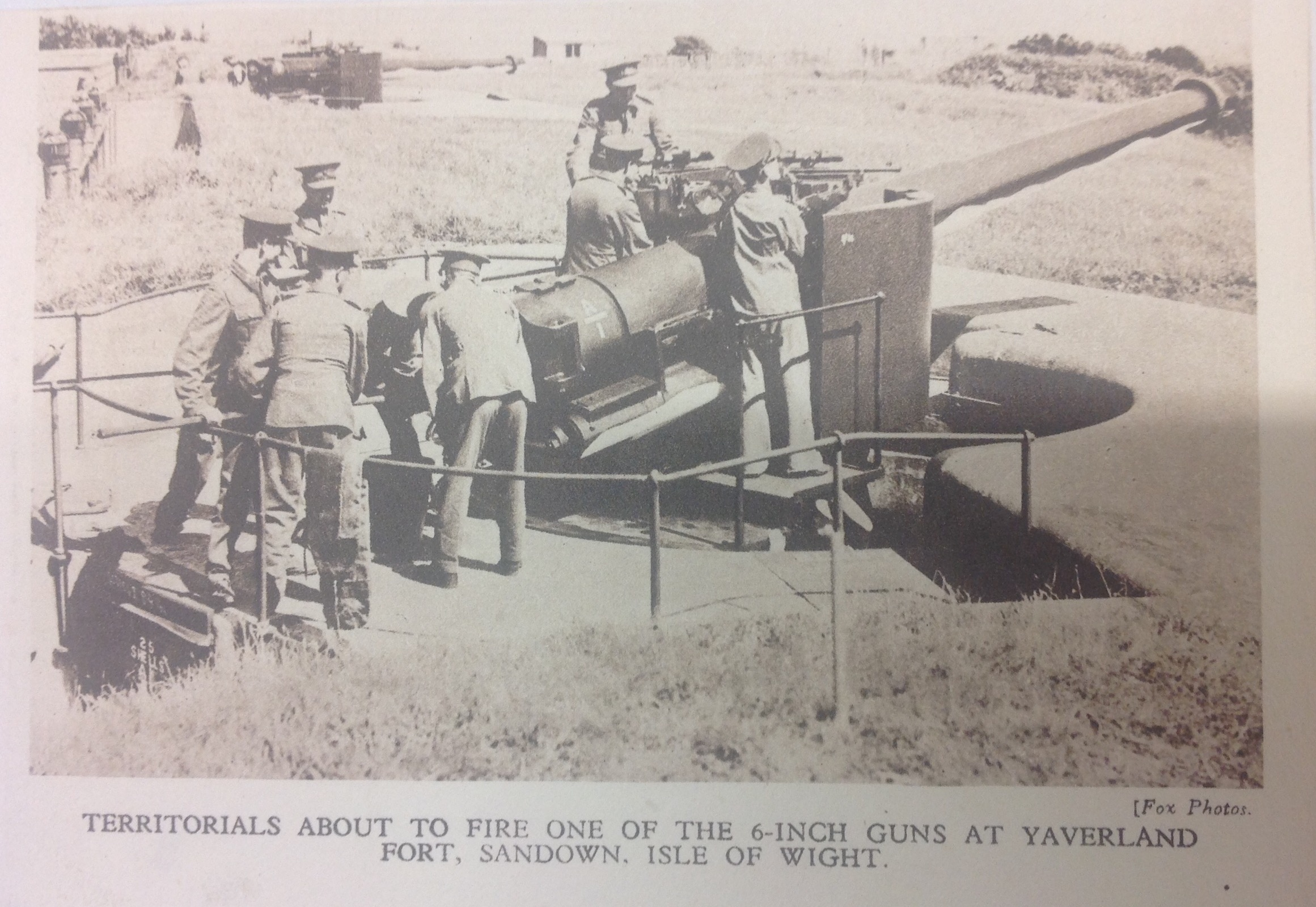
Territorial Artillery practise at Yaverland Battery with 6-inch guns, c1935

Between the First and Second World Wars the battery was used by Territorial Army artillery units for Coast Artillery gun practise. In 1956 on the dissolution of Coast Artillery all of the guns were removed and the site sold off. It was developed for use as a holiday camp.

The remains of the Battery are now a Scheduled Ancient Monument.

== Publications ==
- Hogg, Ian V (1974). Coast Defences of England and Wales 1856–1956. David & Charles. ISBN 0-7153 6353-0.
- Col. K. W. Maurice-Jones (1959). The History of Coast Artillery in the British Army. London: Royal Artillery Institution.
- Moore, David, 2010. The East Wight Defences, Solent Papers Number 10, David Moore, Gosport. ISBN 0954845331
