= Sandown Bay =

Broad open bay part of the Isle of Wight's southeastern coast

Coordinates: 50.652°N 1.16°W

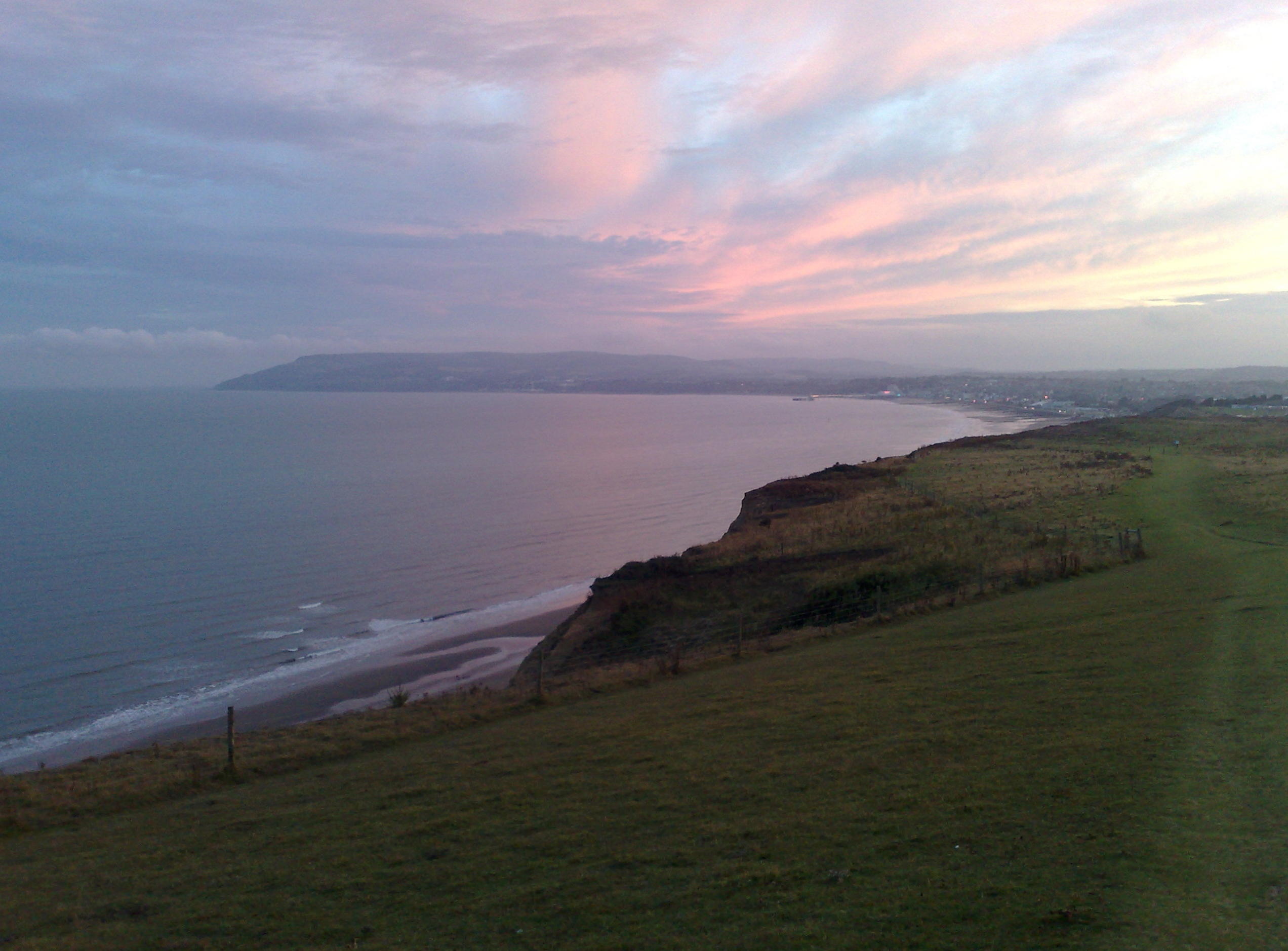
- Sandown Bay at dusk; looking south-west from Culver Down

- Location within the Isle of Wight
- Civil parish: Shanklin, Sandown
- Ceremonial county: Isle of Wight
- Region: South East
- Country: England
- Sovereign state: United Kingdom
- UK Parliament: Isle of Wight East

Sandown Bay is a broad open bay which stretches for much of the length of the Isle of Wight's southeastern coast. It extends 8 1/2 miles (13.7 km) from Culver Down, near Yaverland in the northeast of the Island, to just south of Shanklin, near the village of Luccombe in the southwest. At Luccombe, the bay is separated from The Undercliff by a large headland from which Upper Ventnor sits atop. The towns of Shanklin, Lake and Sandown are on the bay's coast, while Luccombe and Upper Ventnor feature panoramic views across both Sandown Bay to the East and the Undercliff to the southwest. Due to the bay being relatively sheltered from offshore winds it is often used as temporary anchorage point for boats, including large cargo ships, before continuing east towards Continental Europe, or north towards The Solent.

== History ==
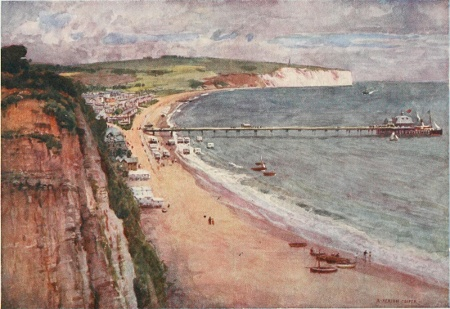
The white cliffs of Culver Down painted by A. Heaton Cooper

In the past, the bay had significant military importance as the wide beach offered a good landing-point for an armed invasion of the Island. To protect against a French or Spanish invasion, Henry VIII built Sandown Castle in the centre of the bay as part of his chain of coastal defences to protect the South-Coast of England. However, the castle was still under construction during the French invasion of the Isle of Wight of 1545 when it was overwhelmed. This castle fell into disrepair due to coastal erosion and was demolished in 1631, though the remains of the foundations of the castle are still visible along the shore at low tide. Sandown Fort, also known as the Diamond Fort after its arrow-headed bastions, this was built using the remains of the old castle further up the coast.

As a result of its sandy beach and good weather, Sandown and Shanklin grew rapidly in the Victorian era as tourists from across both the Island and the country came to enjoy the seaside thanks to new the transportation connections of the railway and paddle steamers. This transformed a relatively sparsely populated area into a series of bustling seaside resorts. New developments included a long promenade, many large seafront hotels and the 875 foot Sandown Pier (originally 360 ft when opened in 1879). A lot of Victorian-influenced architecture can still be seen throughout the bay.

== Geography ==
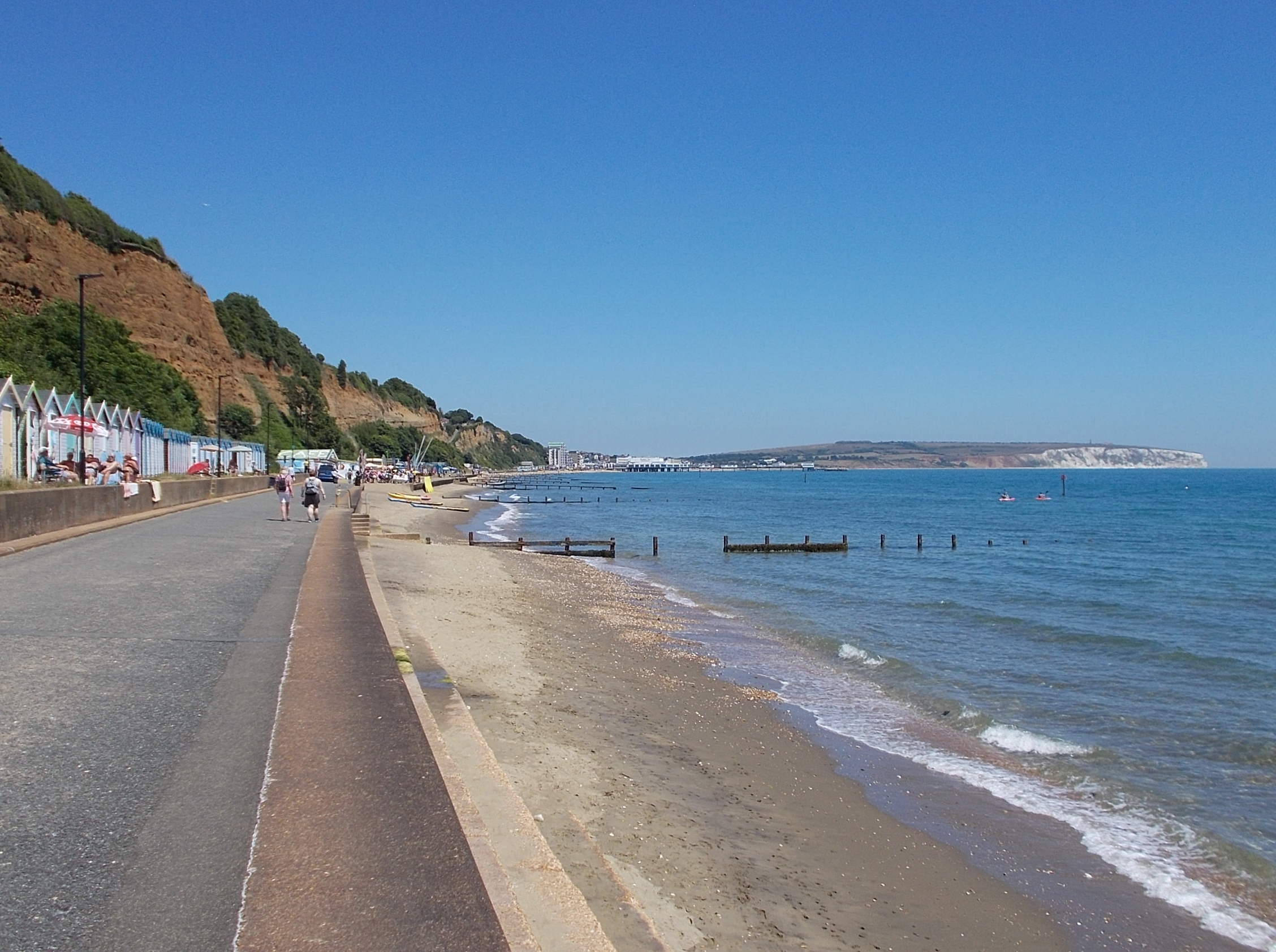
Sandown Bay at Lake, looking north-east towards Sandown, with Yaverland and Culver Down in the distance

Sandown Bay is an excellent example of a concordant coastline and has well-developed sandy beaches stretching all the way from Shanklin to Culver Down due to Longshore drift. The bay has over 5 miles of unbroken sandy beach, making it one of the longest beaches in the British Isles. The area has weak sandstone cliffs which vary from 30 to 130 feet (10 to 40 m), these have suffered from erosion and instability in the past. The risk of cliff-failures affecting populated tourist areas led the Isle of Wight Council to commission a report and an extensive structural stabilisation programme in 1988.

The bay is best viewed from Culver Down to the north. The Isle of Wight Coastal Path follows the whole bay-line either along the cliff top to the south of Sandown or the concrete seawall north of Sandown.

The bay itself has a seabed consisting of a mixture of sand, shells and gravel with shallow waters out till about one-quarter of a nautical mile (1,500 ft; 460 m). The total area of the bay is 5 square miles (13 km^{2}).

== Economy and tourism ==
The economy of the bay is dominated by retail and hospitality sectors due to a large amount of tourism it receives, an estimate of 500,000 visitors annually. However, the average earnings of people living around the bay are approximately 10% below the national average. A local action-plan, the Bay Area Action Plan, has been set up in 2016 for the development of the bay for the next 15 years. It plans to get local and national funding with the aim to improve public spaces and increase the level of tourism. The bay has a combined total of 21,374 inhabitants.

== Maritime incidents ==
The outer bay is used as a sheltered anchorage. Ships requiring salvage have sometimes been towed there, such as the tanker Tarpenbeck in 1979. The wreck of a salvage tug (the Harry Sharman) which assisted the stricken tanker Pacific Glory in 1970, was visible for some decades at low tide below Culver Cliffs.

== Notes ==
- From the Beautiful Britain series, The Isle of Wight, by G. E. Mitton, 1911. Caption: The white cliffs of Culver Down are the eastward end of the rib of chalk which has its other extremity at the Needles.

== Sources ==
- Adams, W. H. Davenport (1884). Isle of Wight: Its History, Topography and Antiquities (new and revised ed.). London, UK: T. Nelson and Sons. OCLC 264864979.
