= List of Palmerston Forts on the South Coast =

A number of Palmerston Forts were built along the south coast of England on recommendation of the 1860 Royal Commission on the Defence of the United Kingdom. As well as new structure, many existing defences were improved. Most were clustered around major ports, such as:

- Dover
- Isle of Wight
- Plymouth
- Portland Harbour
- Portsmouth

However, some more isolated works did take place at:

- Hurst Castle, Hampshire
- Littlehampton Redoubt, Littlehampton, West Sussex
- Newhaven Fort, Newhaven
- Shoreham Redoubt, Shoreham-by-Sea, West Sussex
