= Kent Film Office =

- Abbreviation: KFO
- Location: Invicta House, Maidstone
- Website: www.kent.gov.uk/filmoffice

The Kent Film Office is a Kent County Council initiative which was set up in 2006 to promote filming in Kent and attract inward investment into the Kent economy from the film and broadcast industries.

Based in County Hall, Maidstone, the Kent Film Office has three staff members who provide a dedicated Film Commissioning Service including a location finding and research service, obtaining film permits, facilitating traffic management requests, sourcing local crew and trainees and mediating any disputes.

The Kent Film Office has the following three priorities for the county of Kent:

- Maximise inward investment from film and television productions
- Safeguard the civil rights and interests of Kent’s residents and businesses
- Support local sector infrastructure

== Productions filmed in Kent ==
Since its launch, filming activity has brought over £85 million into Kent, with the Kent Film Office assisting many high profile productions including:

Feature films:

- Spider-Man: Brand New Day (2026) Marvel filmed at Chatham Historic Dockyard.
- F1 (2025) Apple TV, Warner Bros. filmed at Brands Hatch.
- Bird (2024) Ad Vitam, Arte France, filmed entirely in Kent including in Gravesend, Dartford, Leysdown-on-Sea and Ashford.
- Better Man (2024) Footloose Productions filmed at Knowlton Court.
- The Wonderful Story of Henry Sugar (2023) Netflix filmed at the Maidstone Studios and the Powerhub.
- Empire of Light (2023) Searchlight Pictures, Neal Street Productions filmed almost entirely in Kent including at Dreamland, Manston Airport, on the East Kent Railway, in Margate, Broadstairs and Maidstone.
- After Love (2020) BBC Film, BFI filmed at the White Cliffs of Dover, Port of Dover and Kingsdown.
- Darkest Hour (2017) Working Title Films filmed at Fort Amherst and Chartwell House.
- Christopher Robin (2018) Walt Disney Pictures filmed at the Port of Dover.
- Wonder Woman (2017) Warner Bros., DC Studios filmed at Lower Halstow.
- Avengers: Age of Ultron (2015) Marvel Studios filmed at Dover Castle.
- Into The Woods (2015) Walt Disney Pictures filmed at Dover Castle.
- World War Z (2013) Skydance Productions, GK Films, Plan B Entertainment filmed at Discovery Park.
- Pirates of the Caribbean - On Stranger Tides (2011) Walt Disney Pictures filmed at Knole.
- Harry Potter and the Deathly Hallows – Part 1 (2010) Heyday Films filmed at the Dartford Crossing.
- Sherlock Holmes (2009) Hartswood Films, WGBH film at The Historic Dockyard Chatham.
- Wild Child (2008) Studio Canal, Relativity Media, Working Title Films filmed at Cobham Hall.
- The Other Boleyn Girl (2008 film) BBC Films, Relativity Media filmed at Dover Castle, Knole and Penshurst Place.

TV:

- Things You Should Have Done (2024-2025) BBC filmed the entire series in Ramsgate, Margate, Broadstairs, Rochester and Canterbury.
- Mr Bates vs the Post Office (2024) ITV filmed in Sevenoaks and Westerham.
- Heartstopper (2021) Netflix filmed in Herne Bay.
- Whitstable Pearl (2021-2024) Acorn TV filmed almost entirely in Whitstable, with scenes also filmed in Canterbury, Faversham, Herne Bay, Margate, Ramsgate, Detling, Dover, Sevenoaks, Rochester and Reculver.
- The Larkins (2021-2022) ITV filmed entirely in Kent, including in Broadstairs, Eynsford, Faversham, Sundridge, Squerryes Court, Margate, Underriver, Chiddingstone, Tonbridge Castle and Canterbury prison.
- Bridgerton (2020-2024) Netflix filmed at Chatham Historic Dockyard and Squerryes Court.
- The Great (2020-2023) Hulu filmed at Hever Castle, St Clere Estate, Botany Bay, Cobham Wood and Chatham Historic Dockyard.
- Top Boy (2019-2022) Netflix filmed in Margate, Ramsgate, Gravesend and Chatham.
- Killing Eve (2018-2022) BBC filmed in Gravesend and Margate.
- Black Mirror (2017-2025) Netflix filmed in Harrietsham, Gravesend], Swale, Chilham, Dungeness, Whitstable and Herne Bay.
- The Crown (2016-2023) Netflix filmed at Chatham Historic Dockyard, Brompton Barracks, Cobham Hall, Lydd, Sandwich and Rochester.
- Wolf Hall (2015) Company Pictures filmed at Dover Castle and Penshurst Place.
- Hetty Feather (2015-2020) CBBC filmed at Cobham Hall.
- The Tunnel (2013) Kudos Film and Television filmed at the Channel Tunnel, Folkestone including the harbour, Discovery Park, Connaught Barracks, Dover including the Port, Margate and Ramsgate.
- Southcliffe (2013) Warp Films filmed at Faversham, Oare Marshes, Whitstable, East Kent Railway, Grain Power station, Canterbury and Sittingbourne.
- Call the Midwife (2012-2026) BBC filmed at the Chatham Historic Dockyard.
- Emma (2009) BBC filmed at Chilham and Squerryes Court.
- Cape Wrath (2007) Ecosse Films filmed at Leybourne Lakes, Mote Park Leisure Centre, Whatman warehouse Rusthall, Kings Hill, Imperial College-Wye Campus.

== Partnerships ==
The Kent Film Office works closely with national partners Creative England and is a member of the Film Offices UK group.

Locally, the Kent Film Office collaborates with organisations including The Maidstone Studios and Screen South.

In 2008, the Kent Film Office worked with all of Kent’s county and district councils, Kent Police and private stakeholders to launch the Kent Filming Partnership, pledging Kent to be a Film Friendly County.

== Kent Development Fund 2009 – 2012 ==
In 2009, the Kent Film Office launched a £200,000 Development Fund to support film and television projects with script development and productions wishing to locate their filming in Kent. The fund invested in productions including Strawberry Fields (2012) and Age of Heroes (2011) and closed in 2012.

== Film Tourism ==
The Kent Film Office has an interactive Movie Map which details feature films and TV dramas filmed in Kent, dating as far back as 1940 film Contraband, which featured Ramsgate. The Kent Movie Map has over 450 productions which have filmed across nearly 300 locations.

The Kent Film Office also has themed trails including Austen, Bond, Darling Buds of May, Dickens , The Other Boleyn Girl and Tudor Trail.
