= Age of Heroes (film) =

- Theatrical release poster
- Directed by: Adrian Vitoria
- Screenplay by: Ed Scates; Adrian Vitoria
- Produced by: Lex Lutzus; James Brown; Jamie Carmichael; Christopher Figg
- Starring: Sean Bean; Danny Dyer; Izabella Miko
- Cinematography: Mark Hamilton
- Edited by: Chris Gill; Joe Parsons
- Music by: Michael Richard Plowman
- Distributed by: Metrodome Distribution
- Release date: 20 May 2011
- Running time: 90 minutes
- Country: United Kingdom
- Languages: English; Norwegian

Age of Heroes is a 2011 British war film directed by Adrian Vitoria.

The film is based on the real-life events of the formation of Ian Fleming's 30 Commando unit during World War II. The film was released in the United Kingdom in 2011.

== Plot ==
The film follows the exploits of Corporal Bob Rains (Danny Dyer) as he is inducted into the newly formed 30 Commando unit in the Second World War, after being freed from a war prison for cowardice and striking an officer during operations in France. Rains and the rest of the platoon are put through intensive training under the watchful eye of Major Jack Jones (Sean Bean), where their skills and endurance are pushed to the limit as they prepare for their first highly classified and dangerous mission: to parachute into occupied Norway and capture new radar technology from the Germans which could change the outcome of the war. (Note: The mission objective bears much resemblance to Operation Biting.)

The newly formed band of brothers are joined in their task by Norwegian immigrant Steinar Mortensen (Aksel Hennie), now a US Marine Lieutenant with vital knowledge of the terrain, and beautiful spy Jensen (Izabella Miko). All their lethal commando skills are put to the test as they attempt to escape fierce gun battles and attain the German radar technology. Their plan is thrown into crisis when their extraction is delayed and they must fight their way to the border of neutral Sweden. With the Germans desperate to hunt them down and stop them, the commandos realise how important their mission is to the war effort.

After a long trek in the snow, the commandos try to resupply by returning to a previously visited farm. Its inhabitants had been shot by German units for aiding the British commandos. To make things worse, the Germans catch up with them at the farm, bringing Corporal Brightling (Stephen Walters), who was captured alive during the earlier fire fight. The Germans urge the commandos' surrender in exchange for the life of their captured comrade. The commandos refuse, and instead open fire on the Germans. Jensen and radar specialist Roger Rollright (John Dagleish) are ordered to make a run for the Swedish border, while the rest of the commandos provide cover for them.

Major Jones realizes that there are too many German soldiers pouring into the fire fight. He orders Rains and Steinar to run for the border, while two others stay to cover them. Those who remain at the farm are last seen firing on and suppressing the Germans. The Germans catch up to Rains and Steinar retreating; Steinar is shot and killed. Out of ammunition, and with three enemy soldiers advancing on him, Rains prepares to cut his own throat. But before doing so, Jensen and Rollright kill the three Germans, thus enabling them to escape overland to Sweden. The last scene shows the two surviving team members and Jensen standing on a hill looking down into a snow-covered valley that leads to Sweden.

== Cast ==
- Sean Bean as Major Jack Jones
- Danny Dyer as Corporal Bob Rains
- Izabella Miko as Liv Jensen
- James D'Arcy as Lieutenant Commander Ian Fleming
- John Dagleish as Flight Sergeant Roger Rollright
- William Houston as Sergeant MacKenzie
- Aksel Hennie as Lieutenant Steinar Mortensen
- Guy Burnet as Riley
- Stephen Walters as Corporal Syd Brightling
- Sebastian Street as RMP Colonel Archer
- Daniel Brocklebank as RMP Sergeant Hamilton
- Rosie Fellner as Sophie Holbrook
- Christian Rubeck as Hauptsturmführer Model
- Eric Madsen as Scharführer Teichman
- Lee Jerrum as Dobson
- Ewan Ross as Gable
- Tom Luke Taylor as Tom

== Production ==
Age of Heroes was shot on location in Norway and in the county of Kent, United Kingdom. They include the disused Gravesend Civil Defence Bunker, the former Connaught Barracks near Fort Burgoyne in Dover, as well as near the village of Pluckley.

== Release ==
Age of Heroes was released in cinemas in the United Kingdom on 20 May 2011. It was released on DVD and Blu-ray in the United Kingdom on 13 June 2011.

== Reception ==
The film received generally mixed to negative reviews from critics, with criticism mostly focusing on Dyer's performance and the effects of its low budget. It holds a 40% critical score on Rotten Tomatoes based on 5 reviews, with an average rating of 4.8/10.
