= Palmerston Forts =

Forts built around the coast of Britain during the Victorian period

The Palmerston Forts are a group of forts and associated structures around the coasts of the United Kingdom and Ireland.

The forts were built during the Victorian period on the recommendations of the 1860 Royal Commission on the Defence of the United Kingdom, prompted by concerns about the strength of the French Navy, and strenuous debate in Parliament about whether the cost could be justified. The name comes from their association with Lord Palmerston, who was Prime Minister at the time and promoted the idea.

The works were also known as Palmerston's Follies, partly because the first ones which were around Portsmouth, had their main armament facing inland to protect Portsmouth from a land-based attack, and thus (as it appeared to some) facing the wrong way to defend from a French attack. The name also derived from the use of the term "folly" to indicate "a costly ornamental building with no practical value". They were criticized because at the time of their completion, the threat from the French navy had passed, largely due to the complete alignment of Napoleon III's foreign policy with British interests then to the withdrawal of France following its crushing by Prussia in the Franco-Prussian War of 1870, and because the technology of the guns had become obsolete. They were the most costly and extensive system of fixed defences undertaken in Britain in peacetime.

Some sixty years previously, there had been a similar period of defence works construction, when some 140 circular towers were built for the same purpose (mainly along the Sussex, Kent and Suffolk coast to protect London) called Martello Towers, but these had become outdated.

== Areas defended ==
The new defences were built to defend a number of key areas of the British, Irish and Channel Island coastline, in particular areas around military bases, including: (Note: Note: links in this list are to "List of Palmerston Forts" articles for those areas. A complete list of forts is available online.)

- Alderney
- Belfast
- Berehaven
- Bristol Channel
- Chatham
- River Clyde
- Cork
- Dover
- Isle of Wight
- Milford Haven
- North Thames and East Anglia
- North East England
- Plymouth
- Portland
- Portsmouth
- Lough Swilly
- South Coast (other than those included in specific areas)

== Gallery of select Palmerston Forts ==
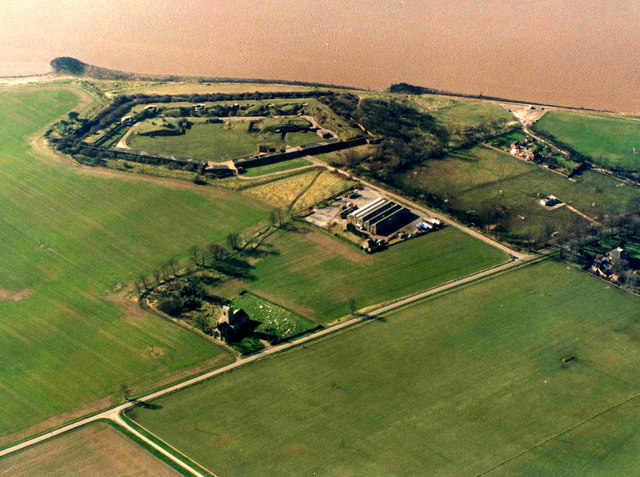
Fort Paull, on the Humber, east coast

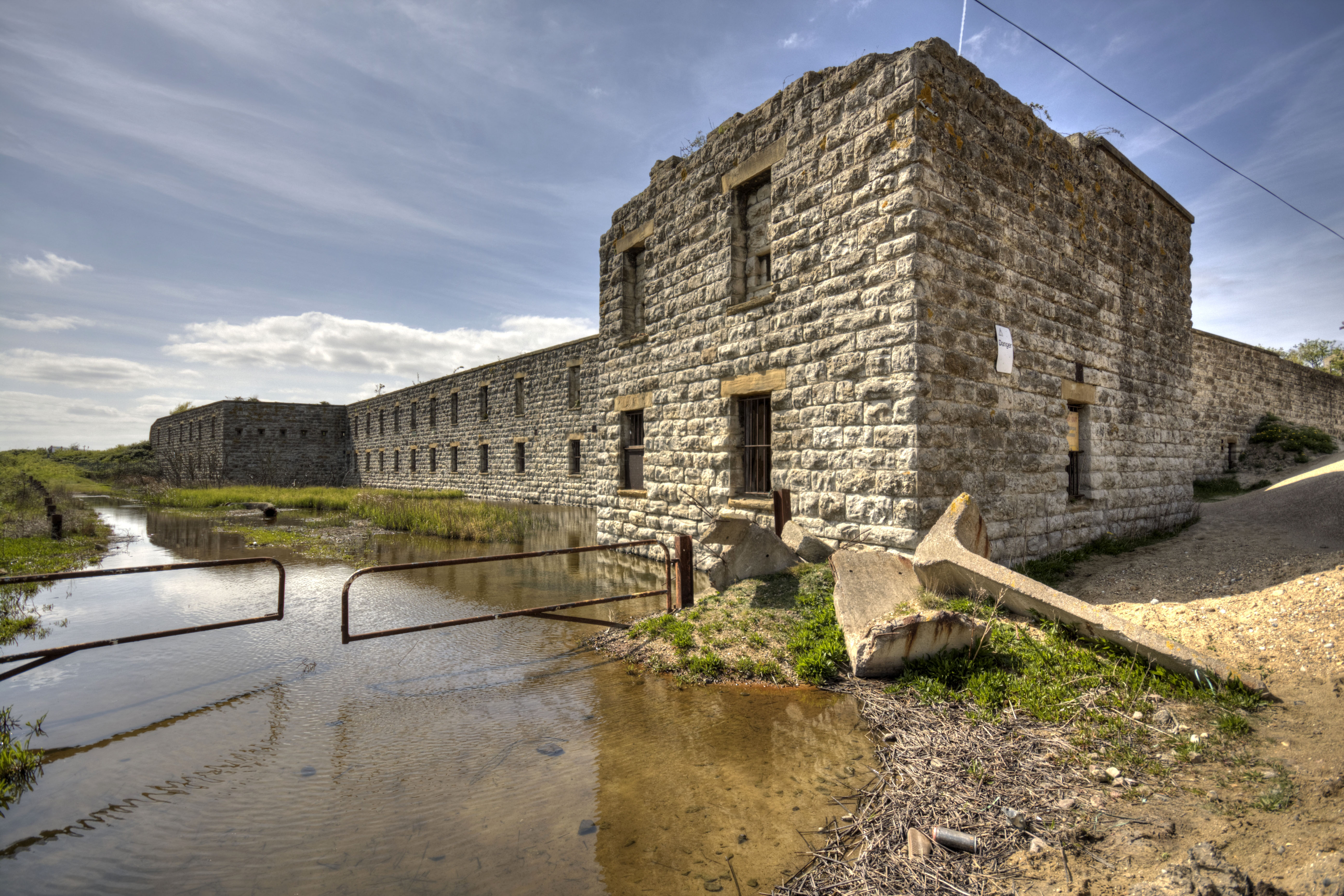
Cliffe Fort, on the south coast of the Thames Estuary

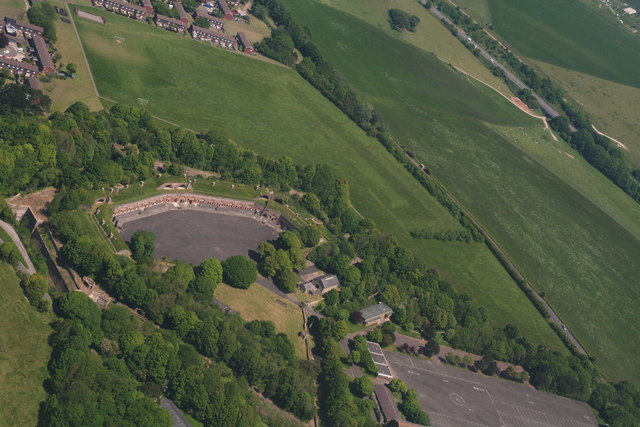
Fort Burgoyne, overlooking Dover's coast

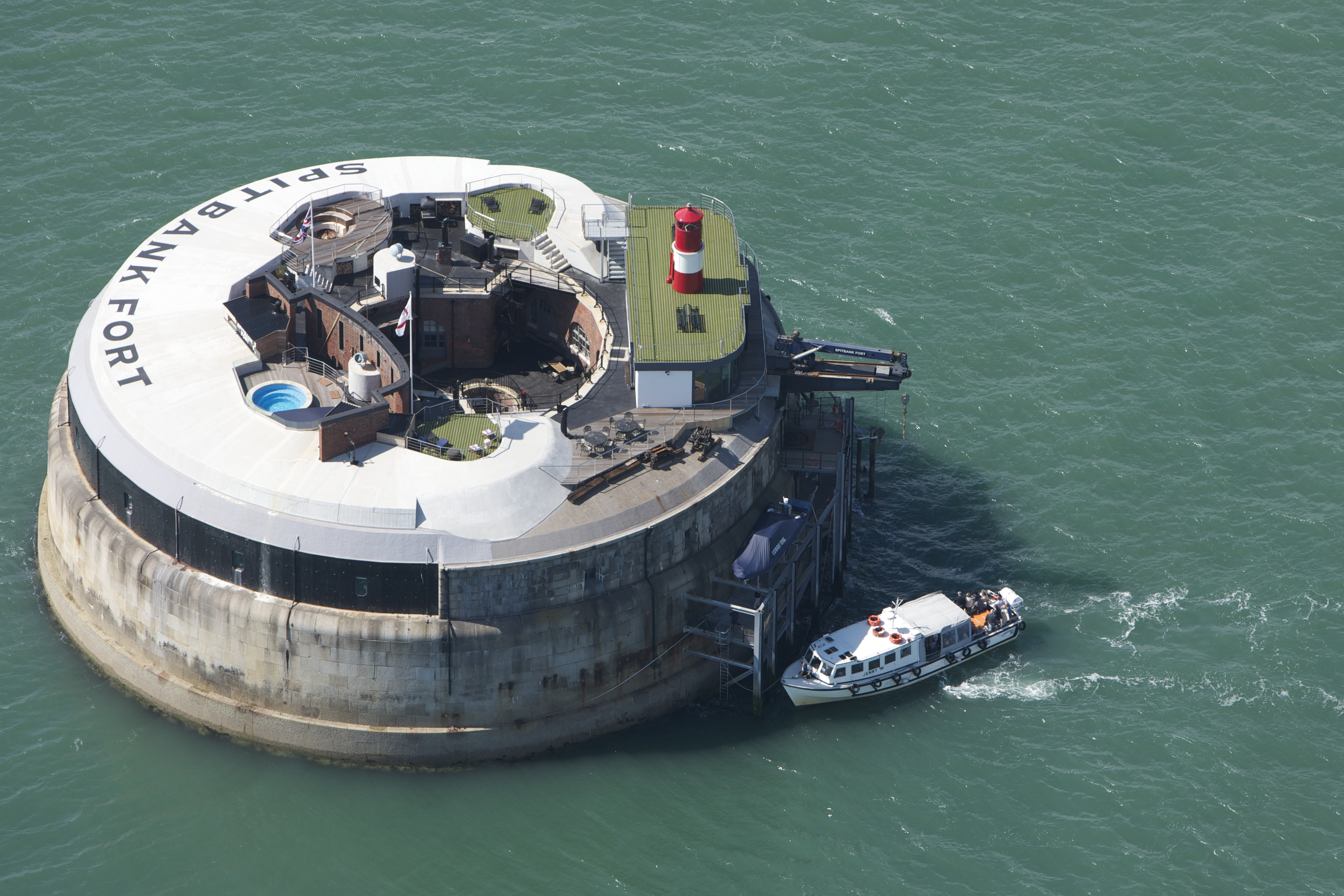
Spitbank Fort, outside Portsmouth Harbour

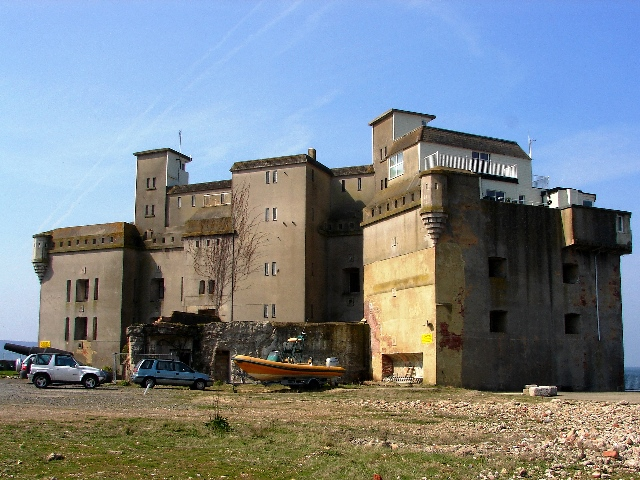
Fort Albert, on the Isle of Wight

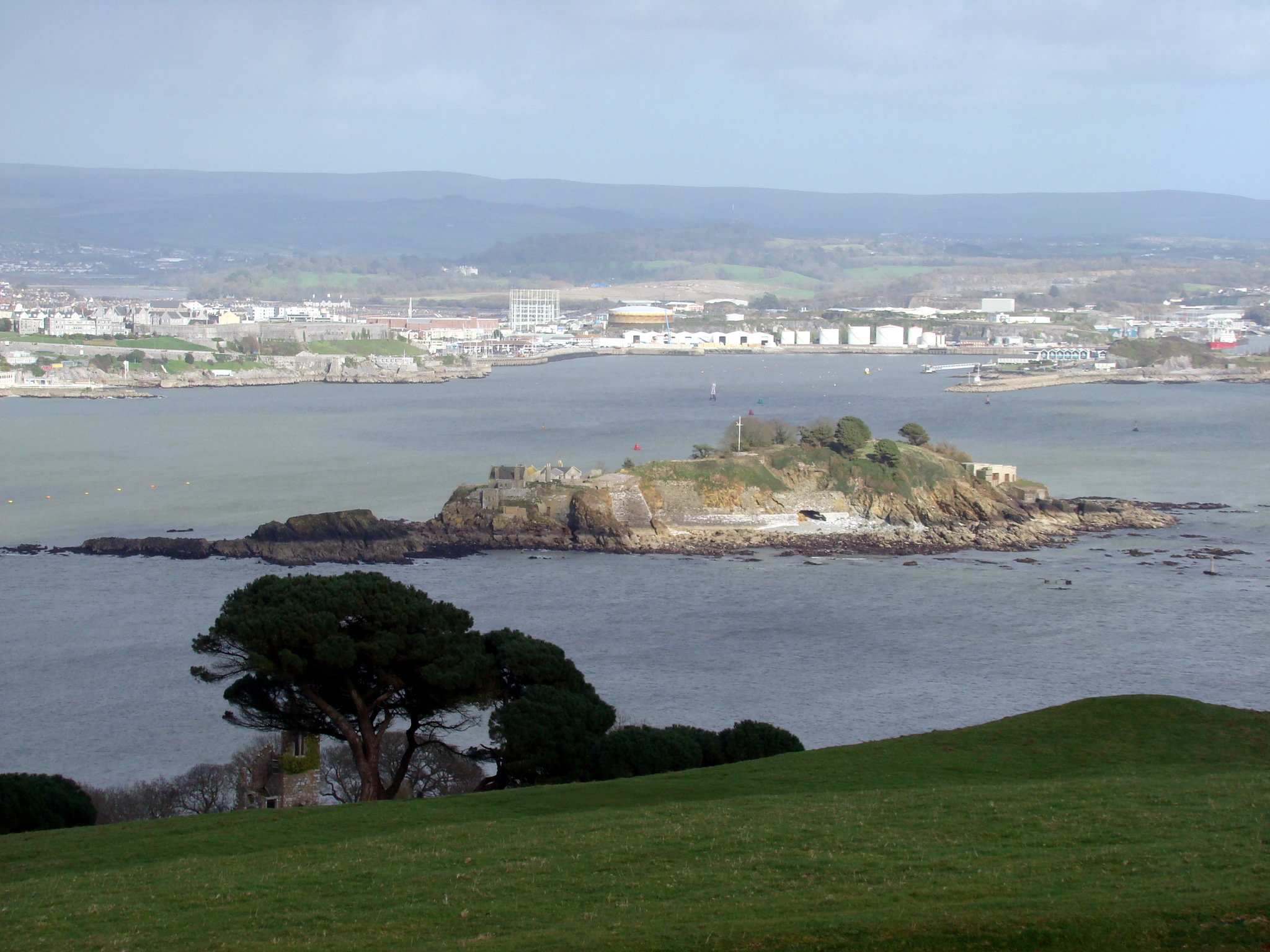
Drake's Island Battery in Plymouth Sound

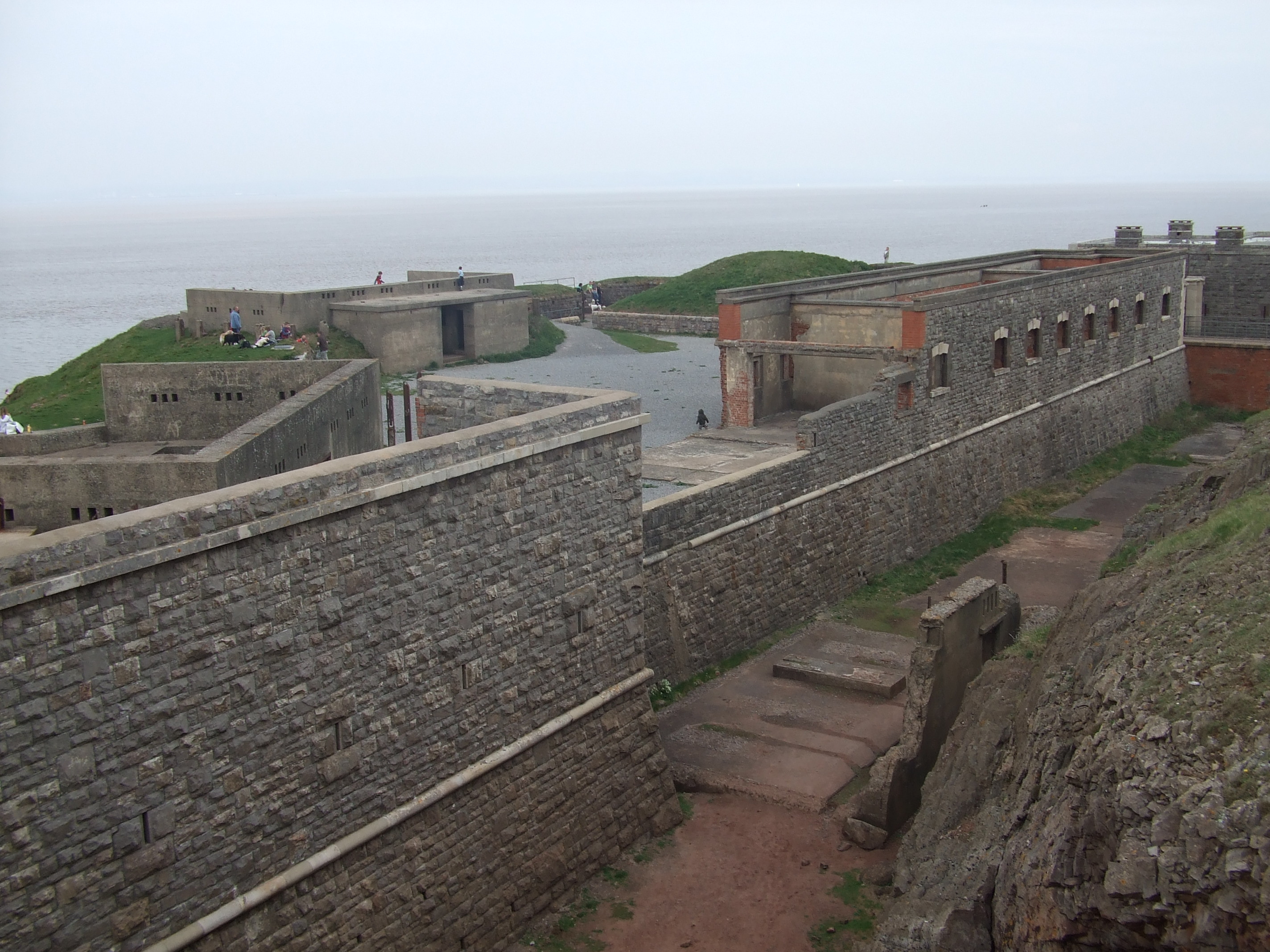
Brean Down Fort, on Bristol Channel's south coast

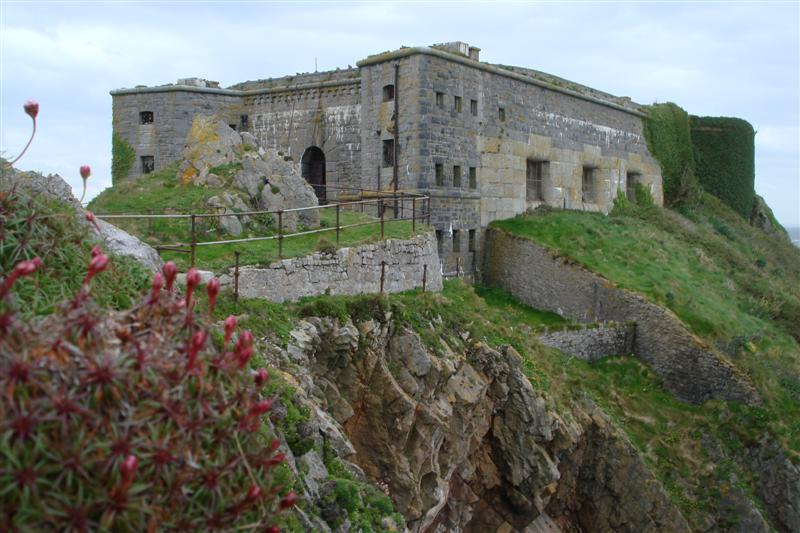
St Catherine's Fort, on southeast coast of Wales

== See also ==
- Folly fort

Other British coastal defences:

- Device Forts (built 1539–1547)
- Maunsell Forts (built 1942–1943)
