= List of Palmerston Forts around North East England =

List of forts in North East England

The Palmerston Forts around the north east of England include:

- Abbs Point Battery, Roker, Sunderland
- Cemetery Battery, Hartlepool
- Frenchman's Battery, South Shields
- Heugh Battery (Hartlepool Battery), Hartlepool
- Lighthouse Battery, Hartlepool
- Fort Paull, Kingston upon Hull
- South Gare Battery, Redcar and Cleveland
- Spanish Battery, Tynemouth
- Tynemouth Castle, Tynemouth
- Wave Basin Battery, Sunderland
