= Museum of Army Transport =

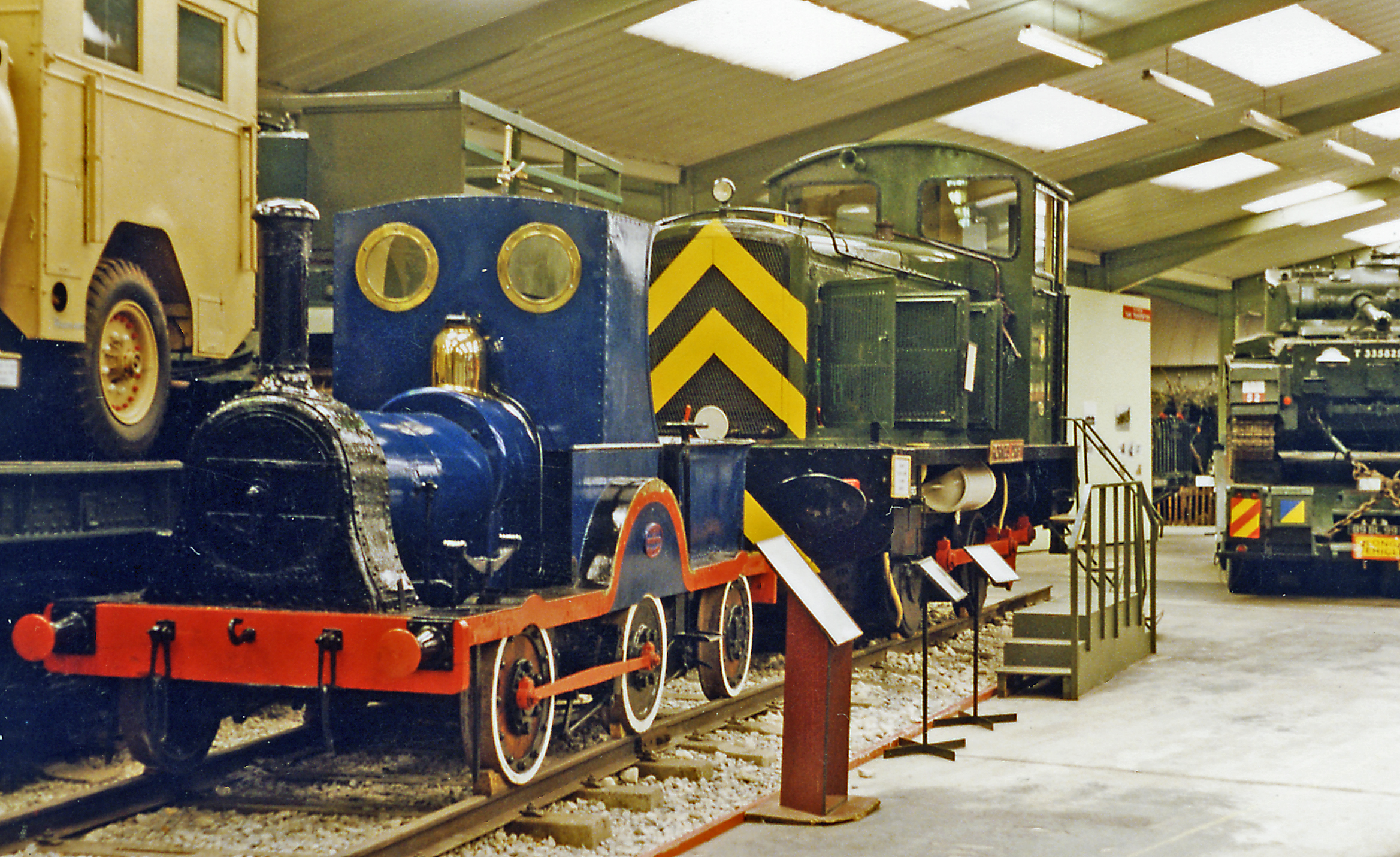
- 0-4-2T 'Gazelle' inside the Museum 8 August 1995
- Established: 1983
- Dissolved: 2003
- Location: Beverley, East Riding of Yorkshire
- Coordinates: 53.83916°N 0.42091°W
- Type: Military museum
- Collections: Vehicles

The Museum of Army Transport was a museum of British Army vehicles in Beverley, East Riding of Yorkshire, England.

The collection included a diverse collection of armoured vehicles and support vehicles, many of which were part of the National Army Museum, as well as railway locomotives and rolling stock, and the only remaining Blackburn Beverley, aircraft XB259, which was the first production Beverley.

== History ==
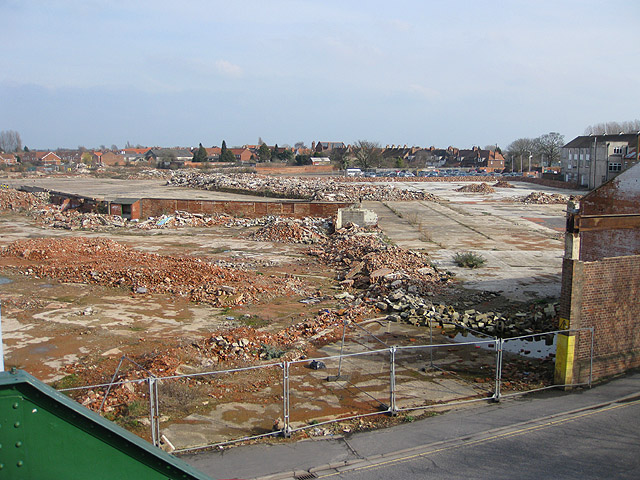
The museum site, cleared for development

The museum was opened in a former tannery in Flemingate in Beverley in April 1983.

The museum went into administration after it was faced with a £140,000 repair bill for its roof, closing on 22 August 2003. The collection was split up, with most of it being moved to the National Army Museum stores in 2005. The Blackburn Beverley was obtained by Fort Paull museum but, after the Fort was closed in 2020, it was then moved in sections to Solway Aviation Museum in Cumbria. Kitchener's railway coach is now at the Royal Engineers Museum.

The National Army Museum also took on the military steam railway locomotives in the MAT collection, briefly putting it into storage before loaning it to the Isle of Wight Steam Railway in 2005 and transferring it and another locomotive, WD198 "Royal Engineer", to the railway three years later. Another such locomotive was the small, 1893 locomotive "Gazelle", which had previously been on display at the Longmoor military railway and is now on loan to the Colonel Stephens Railway Museum, Tenterden. The National Army Museum now stores most of the MAT collection vehicles in Stevenage, though several are on loan to The Tank Museum at Bovington Camp, Dorset.
