= List of Palmerston Forts in the Isle of Portland area =

The Palmerston Forts (19th-century fortifications built to defend Britain from a perceived French threat) in the Isle of Portland area, Dorset, England, are:

- East Weare Battery
- Inner Pierhead Fort
- The Nothe Fort
- Portland Breakwater Fort
- The Verne Citadel (later including Verne High Angle Battery)
