= List of Palmerston Forts around the River Clyde =

Palmerston Forts built around the River Clyde include:

- Ardhallow Battery, Dunoon
- Fort Matilda, Greenock
- Portkil Battery, Clyde
