= List of Palmerston Forts in East Anglia =

The Palmerston Forts along the north bank of the Thames River and East Anglia include:

- Coalhouse Fort, East Tilbury
- East Tilbury Battery, East Tilbury
- Landguard Fort, Felixstowe
