= Littlehampton Redoubt =

Fort at entrance to the River Arun at Littlehampton

Coordinates: 50°48′04″N 0°32′38″W

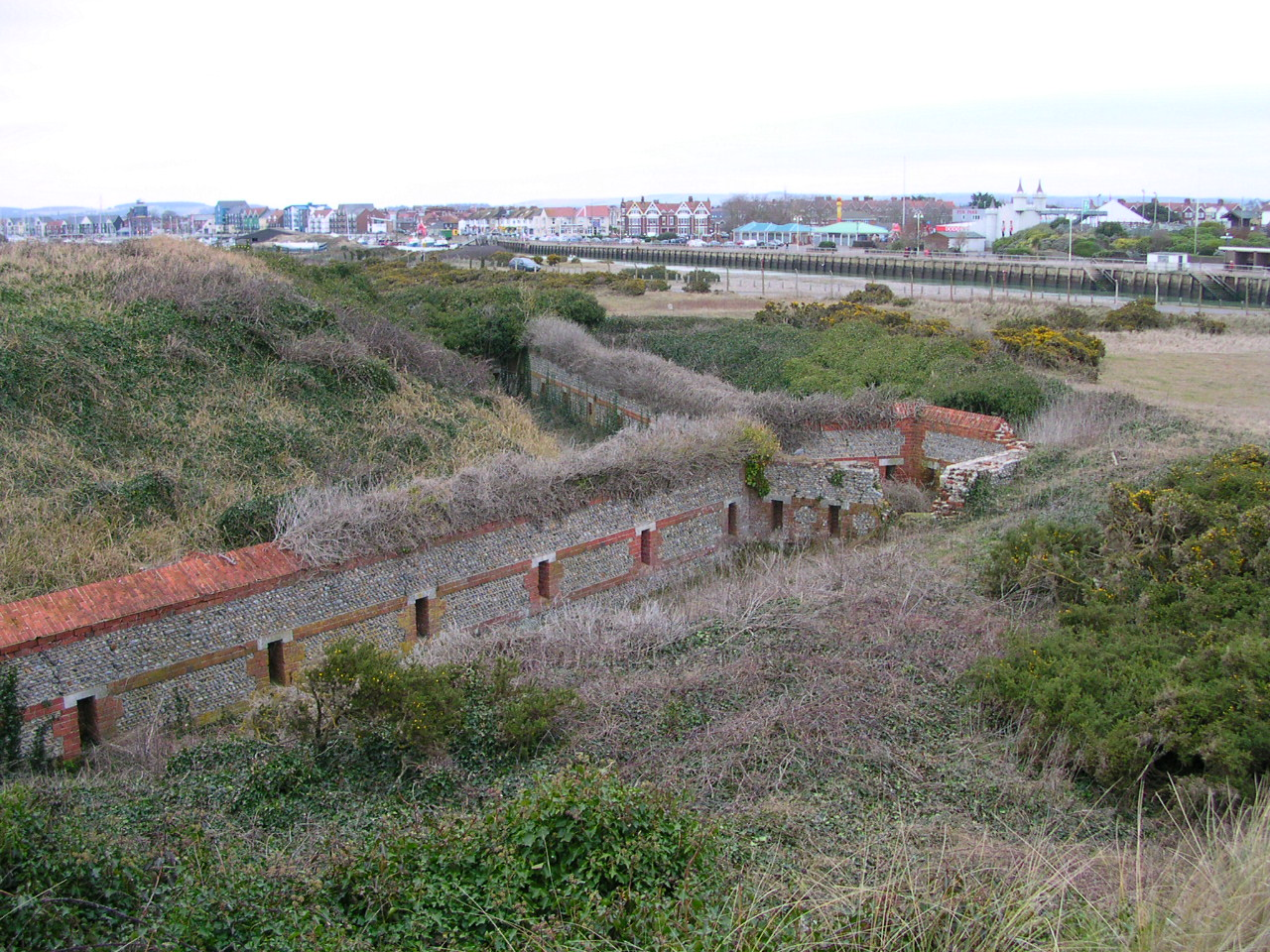

Littlehampton Redoubt, usually known as Littlehampton Fort, was built in 1854 to protect the entrance to the River Arun at Littlehampton on the south coast of England, against possible attack by the French under the Emperor Napoleon III. There had been a previous battery on the east bank of the river, but the new fort was built on the west bank. It consisted of a platform from which cannon could sweep the harbour mouth, with a barracks behind and a surrounding defensive ditch and wall. The fort was an innovative military structure, incorporating the new feature of a Carnot wall. Its active use as a fort was short at only about 20 years, owing to technical changes in armaments, but it was a precursor of the later Palmerston Forts built after the 1860 commission. Littlehampton Fort is now in a ruinous and overgrown state.

== Previous fortifications ==
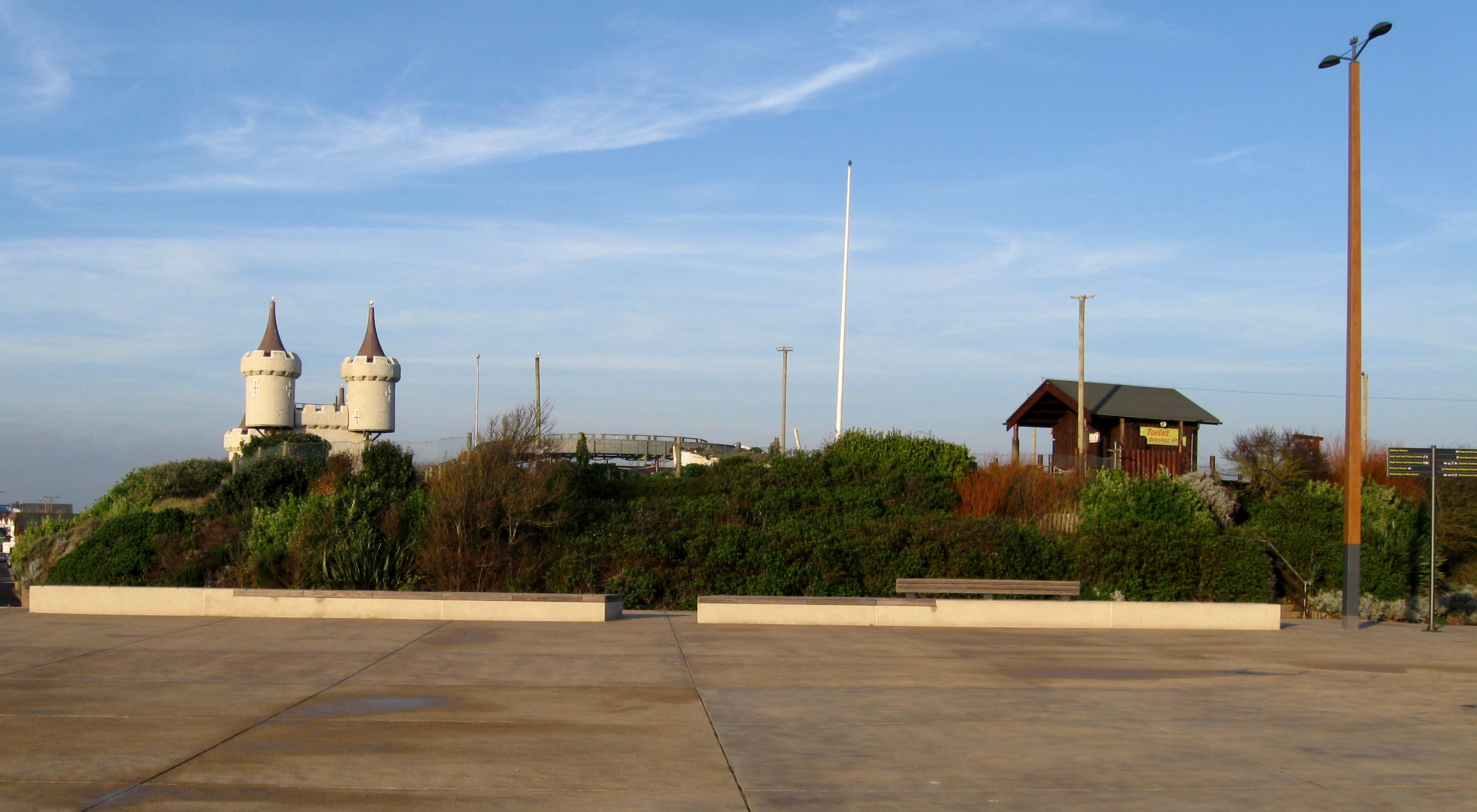
The remains of the old battery on the east bank of the River Arun in Littlehampton, West Sussex, United Kingdom.

A battery was planned for the east bank of the Arun at Littlehampton in about 1587, but there is no record of it having been erected and no trace of it has been discovered. There was though a five gun battery at Littlehampton in the early eighteenth century.

In 1756 the Seven Year War with France began and there was a concern about invasion. A battery was erected on the east bank of the river in 1760. This consisted of a bastion set at right angles to the river bank with seven guns which covered the river mouth and seafront. The rampart of this construction still remains incorporated into the amusement park called Harbour Park.

== Plans for a new fort ==
In the 1840s both public opinion and MPs put pressure on the government to better fortify the south coast against a French attack. In 1846 the Duke of Wellington wrote a public letter to Sir John Burgoyne, Inspector of General Fortifications, expressing his concern about the lack of defensive works along the south coast.

Also in 1846 Burgoyne produced a paper entitled “Observations on the Possible Results of a War with France, Under Our Present System of Military Preparation.” This was a vigorous confirmation of everything Wellington had argued. A copy of this paper was sent to Wellington who wrote back a letter to Burgoyne in January 1847 expressing his agreement with all Burgoyne's views and reiterating his earlier arguments. Wellington's letter was leaked to the press by a friend of Burgoyne's wife and published in the Morning Chronicle in 1848 causing huge public alarm and a debate in the House of Commons. This led to discussions in the newspapers, which culminated in Parliament voting additional funds for naval and military expenditure. There was also alarm about the intentions of the Emperor Napoleon III in 1852 to 1853.

The Board of Ordnance decided to build a fort at Littlehampton. Historian John Goodwin comments that "the War Office were worried that [the capture of the ports of Littlehampton and Shoreham] would enable the enemy to use the quays for the supply and reinforcement of troops landed to attack Portsmouth from the rear, prior to a march on London."

In the early 1850s planning began for construction of a new fort on the west bank of the river. The work was completed in September 1854 at a cost of £7,615. Construction was overseen by Captain Fenwick of the Royal Engineers.The main building work was undertaken by Locke and Nesham, a large London firm who had already constructed several public buildings including Wandsworth Prison. In addition the glacis was built by the local firm of Robert Bushby.

== Description of the 1854 fort ==
The new fort was in the shape of a lunette, a straight-sided crescent. The fort consisted of a platform for the guns with ramparts surrounded by a nine-yard (eight-metre) wide ditch, which incorporated a Carnot wall running along its centre. This was designed to halt attackers attempting to cross the ditch. The wall itself had loop-holes for defenders to fire through. In addition, at each corner were projecting open bastions from which the garrison could fire at besiegers along the length of the wall. To the rear of the gun platform was a fortified barrack block. The fort was the first of its kind in the United Kingdom; its Carnot wall and three open bastions made it unique.

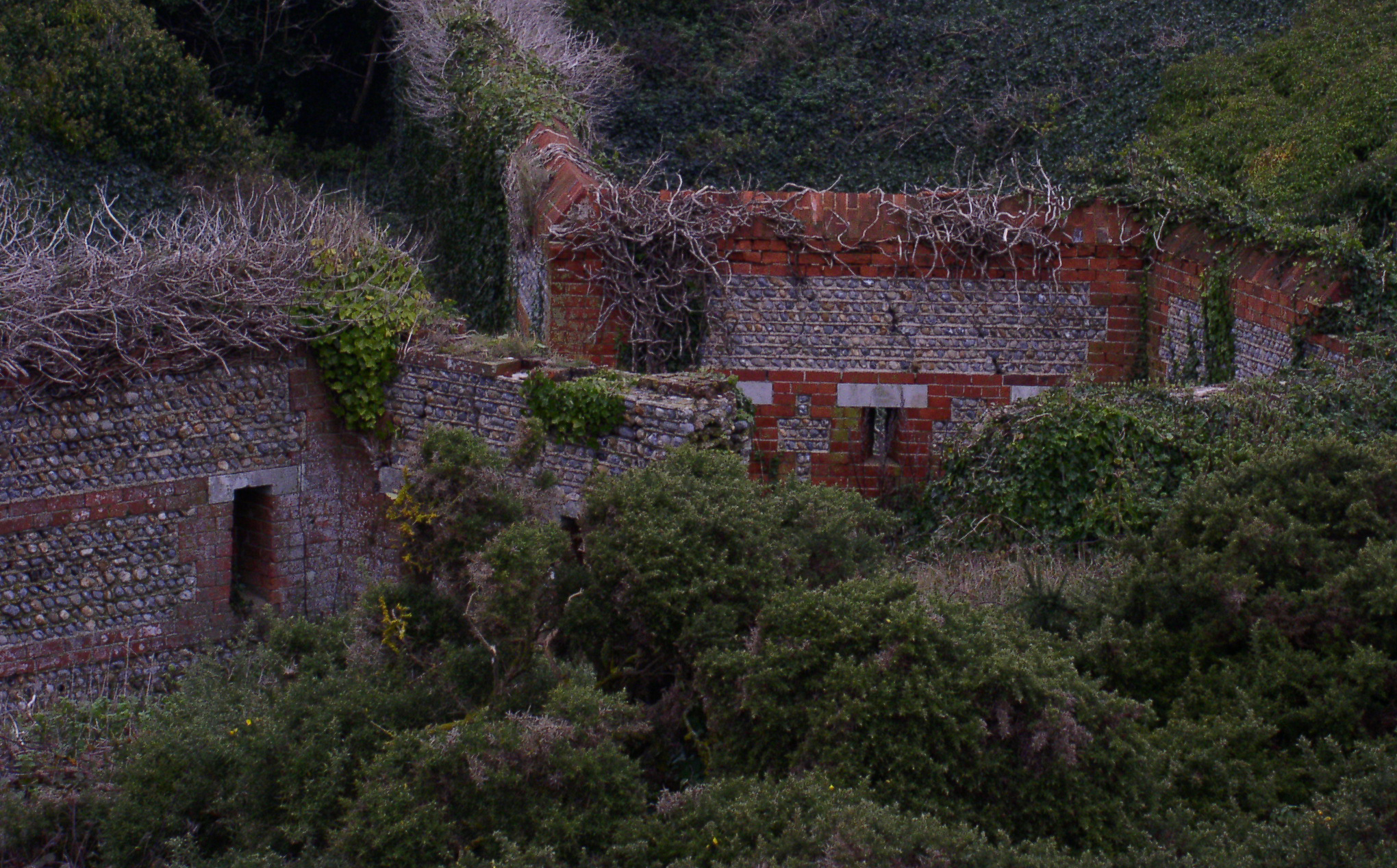
One of the open bastions and part of the Carnot wall

A further barrack block was later built outside the fort to house additional troops. The 1861 Census shows a total complement of 70 men including a gunner, surgeon, drummer, officers, NCOs and privates. The armaments, brought by sea from Woolwich arsenal, were three 68-pounder and two 32-pounder cannons.

== Later history of the fort ==
The Committee on Coast Defences Report of 1873 found that Littlehampton Fort was inadequate as it only had smooth bore guns and it was weakly constructed with open bastions and no casemates for the guns and no iron-cladding. The Committee recommended an upgrade: “Littlehampton – Remodel fort and arm partly or wholly with heavy guns.” The upgrade was never carried out. The guns were finally removed in 1891 and the fort partially dismantled.

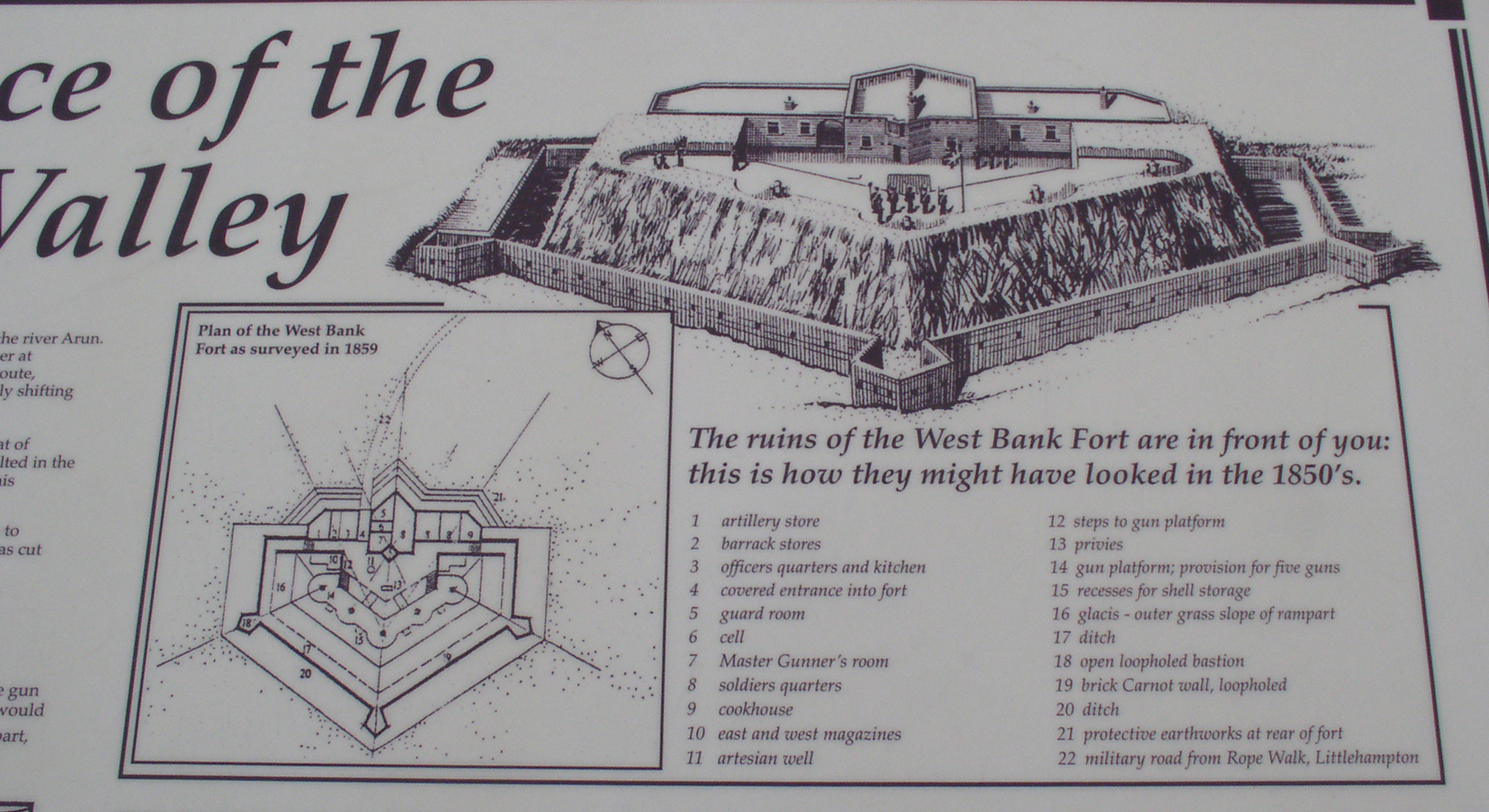
The notice at the fort

Today (2011) the fenced off site is well presented from a viewing place on a wooden walkway laid across the sand dunes. A notice with a diagram describes what can be seen of the fort, that is the surrounding ditch, one of the bastions, part of the Carnot wall and the ramparts behind.

== See also ==
- Dymchurch Redoubt
- Eastbourne Redoubt
- Harwich Redoubt
- Shoreham Redoubt

== Bibliography ==
- Butler, Chris (2008). West Sussex Under Attack. Stroud: Tempus Publishing.
- Goodwin, John (1985). The Military Defence of West Sussex. Midhurst: Middleton Press.
- Spiers, Edward M. (1980). The army and society, 1815-1914. London: Longman. ISBN 978-0-582-48565-5.
- Strachan, Hew (1984). Wellington's legacy: the reform of the British Army, 1830-54. Manchester: Manchester University Press. ISBN 978-0-7190-0994-5.
