= List of Palmerston Forts at Dover =

The Palmerston Forts that defend Dover were built in response to the 1859 Royal Commission dealing with the perceived threat of a French invasion. The forts were intended to defend the Port of Dover, that would provide direct access to an invasion fleet, from capture. Construction was carried out by the Royal Engineers and civilian contractors (under Royal Engineer supervision). In addition to the newly constructed forts, extensive work was carried out on existing fortifications. The fortifications built or upgraded as part of the works were:

- Admiralty Pier Turret
- Archcliffe Fort
- Dover Castle complex, including:
  - East Demi Battery
  - Hospital Battery
  - Shotyard Battery
  - Shoulder of Mutton Battery
- Fort Burgoyne
- Langdon Battery
- Western Heights complex, including:
  - Dover Citadel
  - Citadel Battery
  - Drop Redoubt
  - Drop Battery
  - Grand Shaft Barracks
  - North Centre Bastion
  - North Centre Detached Bastion
  - North Entrance
  - South Entrance
  - South Front Barracks
  - St Martin Battery
