= Inner Pierhead Fort =

Coordinates: 50.5691°N 2.4223°W

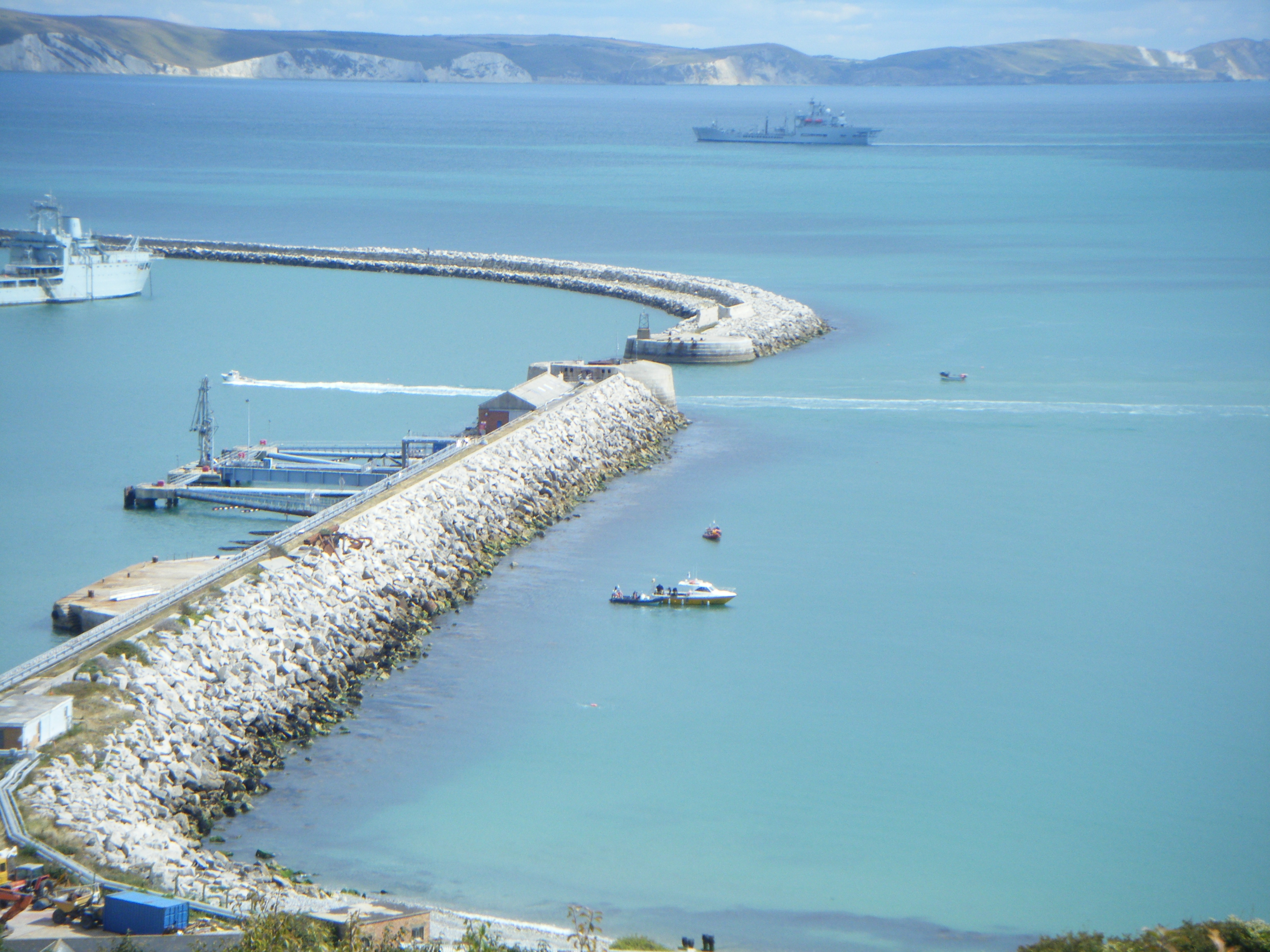
The Inner Pierhead Fort and inner breakwater.

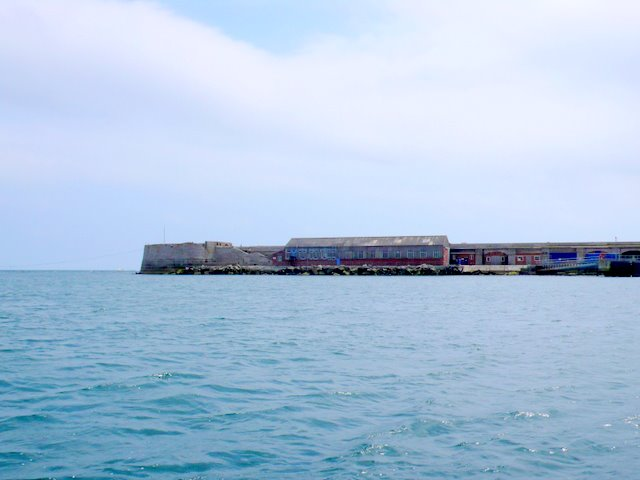
The Inner Pierhead Fort

Inner Pierhead Fort is a 19th-century fort built to defend Portland Harbour at the Isle of Portland in Dorset, England. It is positioned on the end of the inner breakwater, which abuts from the former dockyard of HMNB Portland. The fort was constructed between 1859-1862, and is 100 ft in diameter. The inner breakwater, including the fort, became grade II listed in 1978.

== History ==
Inner Pierhead Fort was one of a number of forts and defence installations built to defend Portland Harbour and its naval base. Prior to its construction, tests on the strength of Portland stone compared with granite was conducted by the Army. Two butt walls were built, one in each stone type, and these were fired upon by HMS Blenheim. As Portland stone was stronger, it was selected as the building stone for the fort.

In 1892, it was reported that the battery was armed with eight 64-pounder guns, and by 1902, two 12-pounder quick-firing guns had been installed. A 40 mm Bofors gun was added during World War II. As the 20th-century progressed, the fort fell into disuse. In 1996, HMNB Portland closed and Portland Port Ltd became the new owners of the harbour, which was transformed into a commercial port.
