= Fort Paull =

Former gun battery in the East Riding of Yorkshire, England

- Paull Cliff Battery; Point Cliff Battery
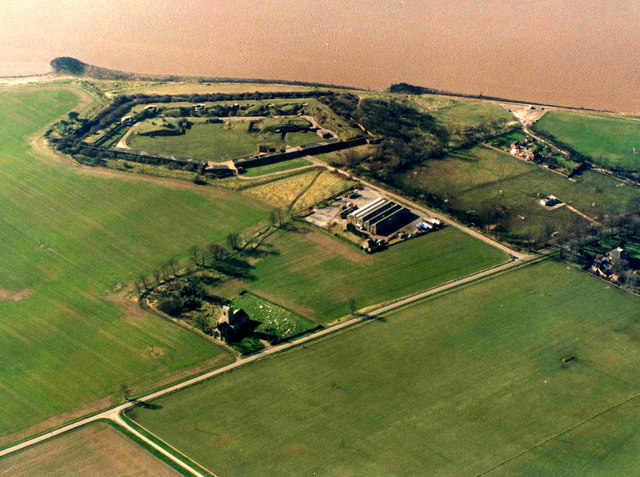
- Aerial view

Site information
- Type: Napoleonic War

Location
- Location within the East Riding
- Coordinates: 53.713360°N 0.229450°W

Site history
- Built: 1861–1864
- In use: 1864–1960

Garrison information
- Occupants: Fort Paull, Museum, Armouries and Visitors Centre

Fort Paull is a gun battery situated on the north bank of the Humber, near the village of Paull, downstream from Hull in the East Riding of Yorkshire, England.

== History ==
Batteries have been built at Paull by Henry VIII, Charles I during the Civil War during the siege of Hull and the Napoleonic Wars. The first fort built on the site was started in 1542 with a capacity for 12 guns. The current fort is of pentagonal design and was built in 1861–4 and on the recommendations of the Royal Commission, hence it is one of the Palmerston Forts.

The original emplacements, nineteen 64-pounder (29 kg) RML artillery pieces were concealed or demolished in 1894 when concrete emplacements for three 6-inch Breech Loading (BL) guns on hydropneumatic carriages and two 4.7-inch Quick Firing (QF) guns were built. A mining station was added in 1886 and searchlights followed in 1907.

At the outset of the First World War, Paull was judged too close to Hull, so was disarmed when new forts were built at Sunk Island and Stallingborough. The fort was used as a training base between the wars, and during the Second World War, it was converted into a magazine to serve the Russian convoys; a degaussing station was also added.

Fort Paull opened to the public as a museum in 2000. Following the closure of the Museum of Army Transport, it became the home of the last remaining complete Blackburn Beverley heavy transport aircraft.

In January 2020, it was announced that the attraction would not be opening for the 2020 season.

The museum's contents were auctioned on 19 September 2020. The contents auction raised a six-figure sum, the Blackburn Beverley bringing in £21,000 on its sale to the Solway Aviation Museum.

In May 2024 a post on Facebook announced the site had been bought and would be undergoing works to reopen. The post referenced the desire to bring the site back for future generations and start running events there again. It mentions they will be starting from scratch after a lot of the museum's contents were auctioned off when it last closed. The attraction reopened on 28 September with a classic car weekend.

== See also ==
- Listed buildings in Paull

== Gallery ==
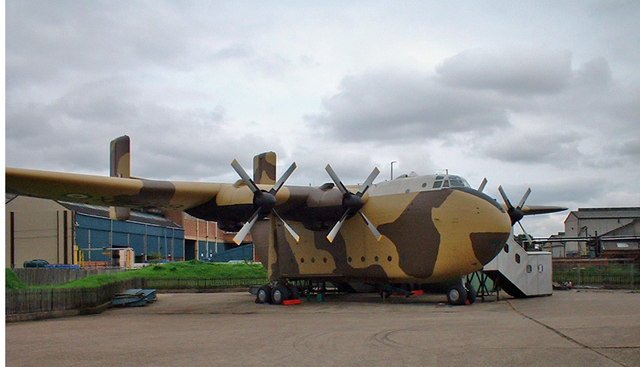
The last Blackburn Beverley

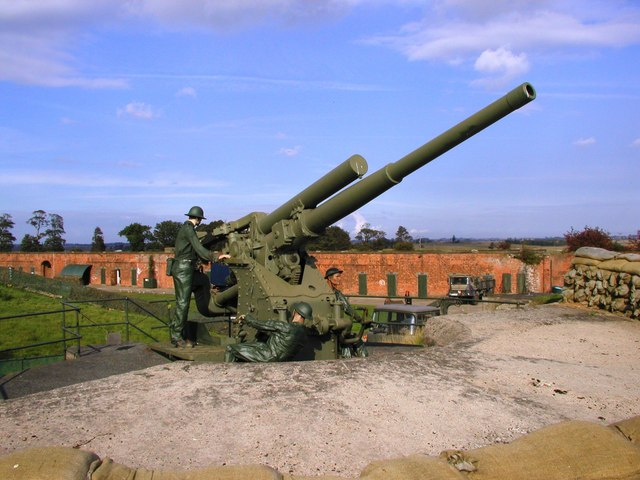
3.7 inch anti-aircraft gun

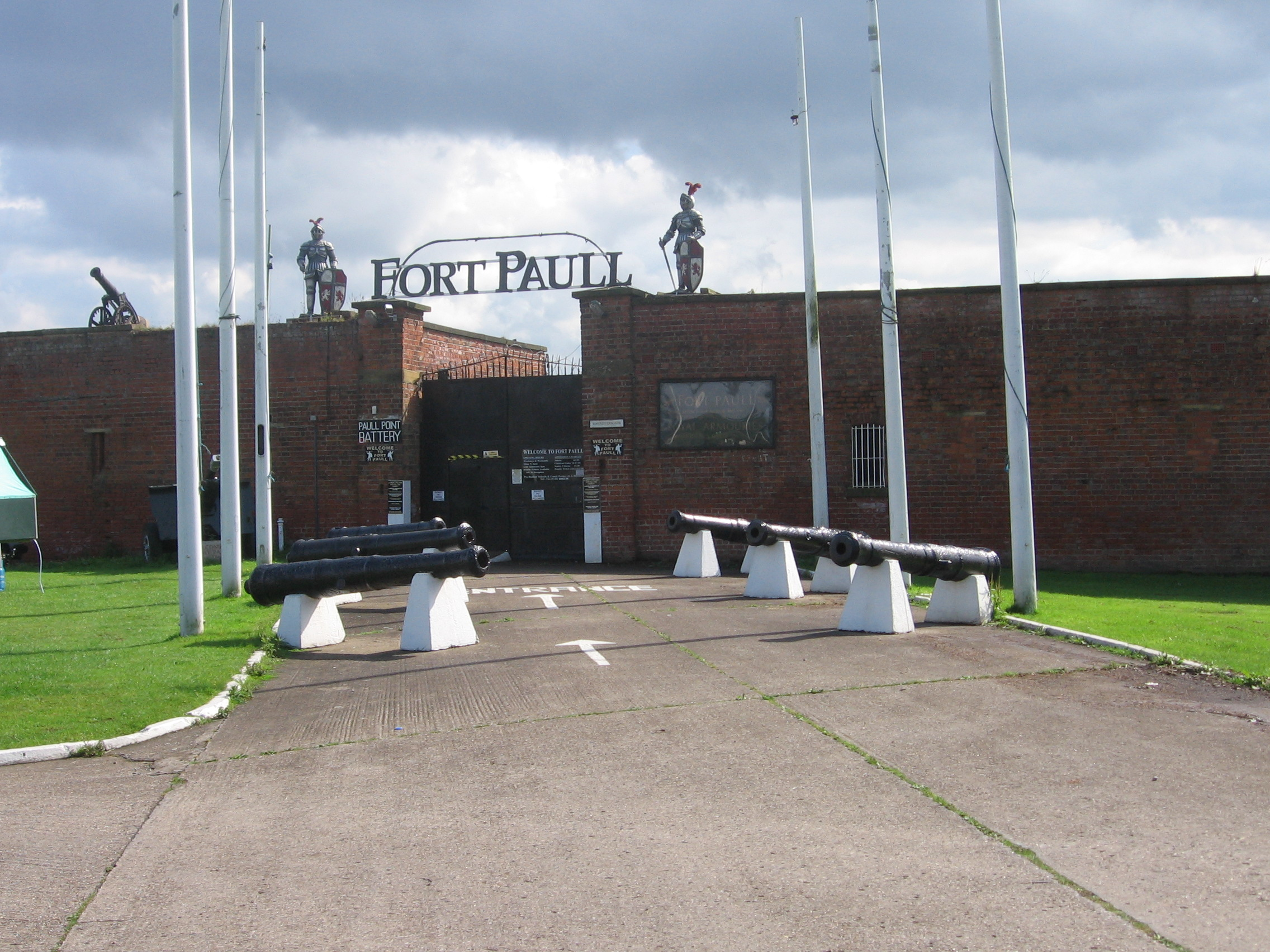
Entrance to Fort Paull
