= Fort Burgoyne =

Coordinates: 51°8′11″N 1°19′16″E

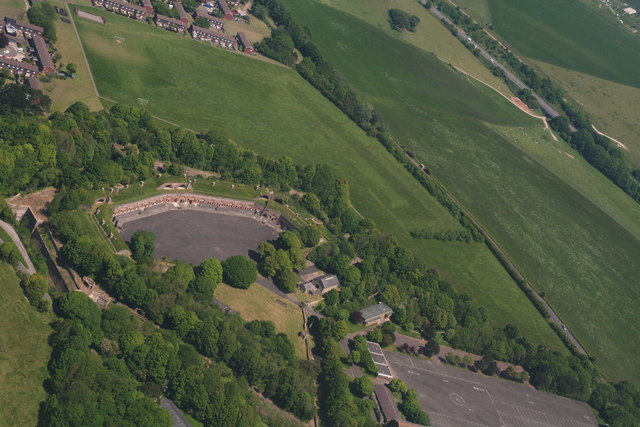
Fort Burgoyne from above

Fort Burgoyne, originally known as Castle Hill Fort, was built in the 1860s as one of the Palmerston forts around Dover in southeast England. It was built to a polygonal system with detached eastern and western redoubts, to guard the high ground northeast of the strategic port of Dover, just north of Dover Castle. The fort is named after the 19th century Field Marshal Sir John Fox Burgoyne, Inspector-General of Fortifications and son of the John Burgoyne who fought in the American Revolutionary War.

After the First World War Fort Burgoyne was used as a military depot or store for Connaught Barracks. Until recently the central part of the fort was still owned by the Ministry of Defence, forming part of the Connaught Barracks site, which is now being redeveloped for housing.

In 2014, Fort Burgoyne and a total of 42 Hectares of land was acquired by the Land Trust. Since acquiring the site the Trust has spent over £2.5 million on priority works (informed by a Coastal Revival Fund grant aided condition survey) to stabilise the site together with transforming the West Wing Battery of the site from condition of derelict buildings and structures lost in woodland to an informal recreation space for the community opened in 2023.

As part of the Trust's long term aspiration to see the Fort become a vibrant business and community space in 2023 a project was completed providing opportunities for businesses to become the first tenants on site.

== Community Participation ==
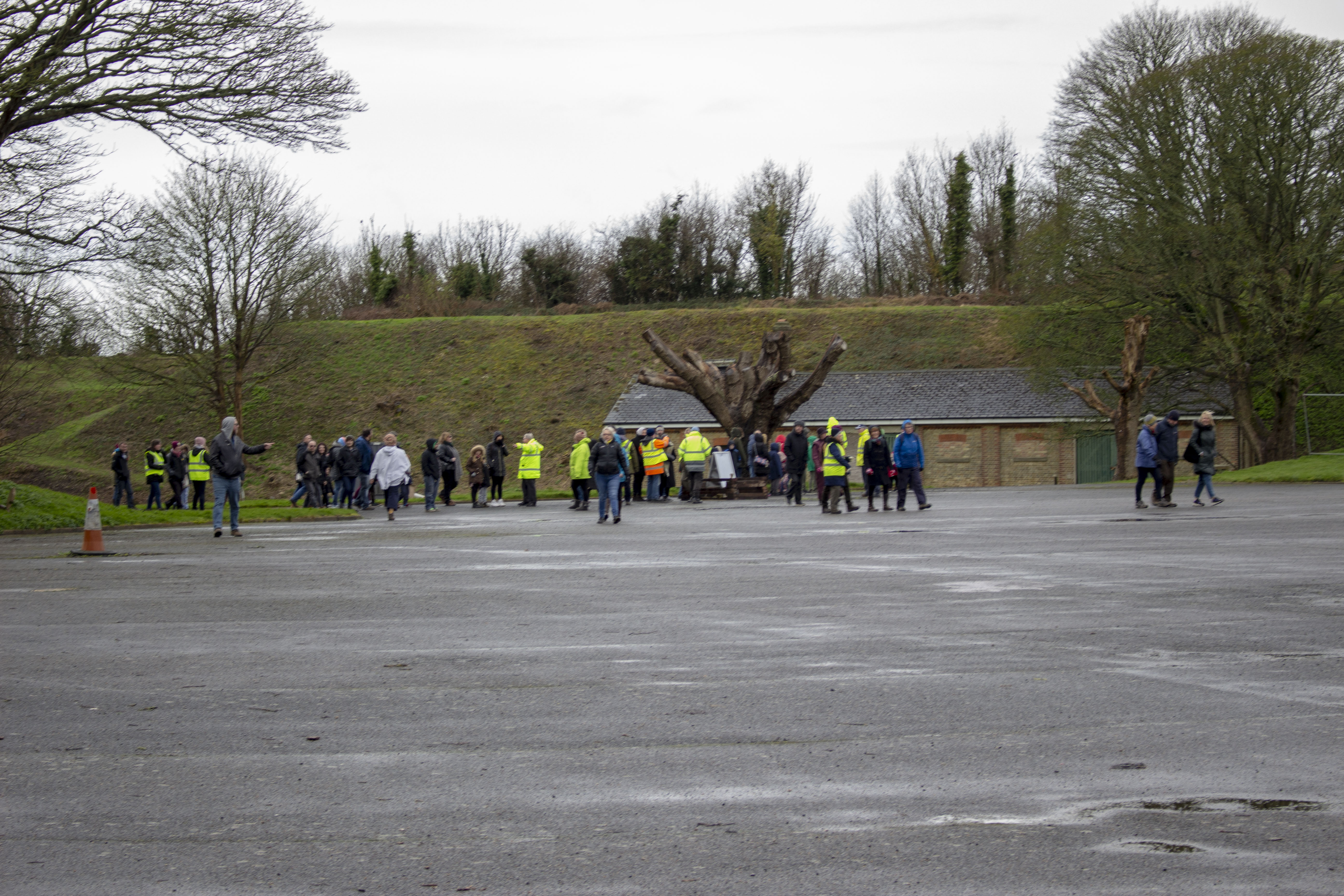
Crowd entering the fort

Since acquiring the Fort, the Land Trust has sought to promote public engagement and participation with the site. While the condition of Fort Burgoyne is such that access to the site is for events only, building a relationship with the community is seen as vital for the future success of the site.

In partnership with White Cliffs Countryside Partnership, the Fort hosts a weekly volunteer group, education visits, and children's activities. The Land Trust 'Green Angels' training programme also runs a number of courses on site annually.

As part of the West Wing Battery transformation project, a 2 week community archaeology dig was undertaken to inform proposals for landscaping works.

The Fort has hosted Dover Armed Forces Weekend in 2022 and 2023 together with community events on fields surrounding the main Fort area. An annual wildlife family funday provides an opportunity for visitors to witness both the historic and wildlife value of Fort Burgoyne.

On the 29 February 2020, Fort Burgoyne was opened to the public for a day. The event was called Waking the Giant and was run by Albion Inc, as part of a commission for Pioneering Places East Kent funded by National Lottery Heritage Fund and Arts Council Great Places programme to map out the future uses of the fort. The event featured: The Museum Of British Folklore, Weaving & Knitting by Robert George Sanders & Katherine Woodward, Blacksmithing by Michael Hart, Ceramics by Ceramic Art Dover & Keith Brymer-Jones, A showing of the film Fortopia By Matt Rowe, a demo of the virtual reality game Escape created by Jake Price, A presentation of future fort use by Central St. Martins, A Makers Market by Future Foundry and Food & Drink by The White Cliffs & Real Deal Roasters.
