= Connaught Barracks, Dover =

Military installation in Kent, England

Connaught Barracks
- Dover
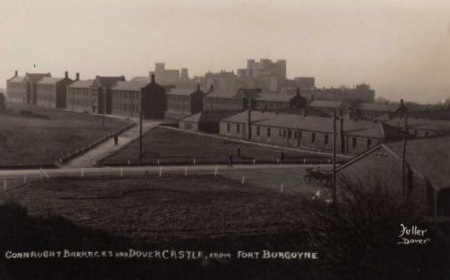
- Connaught Barracks, Dover

Site information
- Type: Barracks
- Owner: Ministry of Defence
- Operator: British Army

Location
- Location within Kent
- Coordinates: 51.13390°N 1.31988°E

Site history
- Built: 1913
- Built for: War Office
- In use: 1913 – present

Connaught Barracks, Dover was a military installation at Dover in Kent.

== History ==
The barracks, which were built about half a mile south of Fort Burgoyne, were completed in July 1913. During the First World War the barracks were used for the assembly of large quantities of men and supplies ready for shipment across the channel to the Western Front.

A major project to rebuild the barracks, which took two years to complete and was undertaken by C Jenner & Sons Ltd, was finished in 1962. The Queen's Lancashire Regiment was formed at the barracks in March 1970.

The 3rd Battalion the Parachute Regiment arrived at the barracks in July 1995 and was replaced by the 1st Battalion the Parachute Regiment in August 2000: the 1st Battalion continued to occupy the site until the barracks closed in March 2006. Plans to use the barracks as an open prison were dropped in November 2006 and the site is now being redeveloped for housing.
