= Sandown Town Hall =

Municipal building in Sandown, Isle of Wight, England

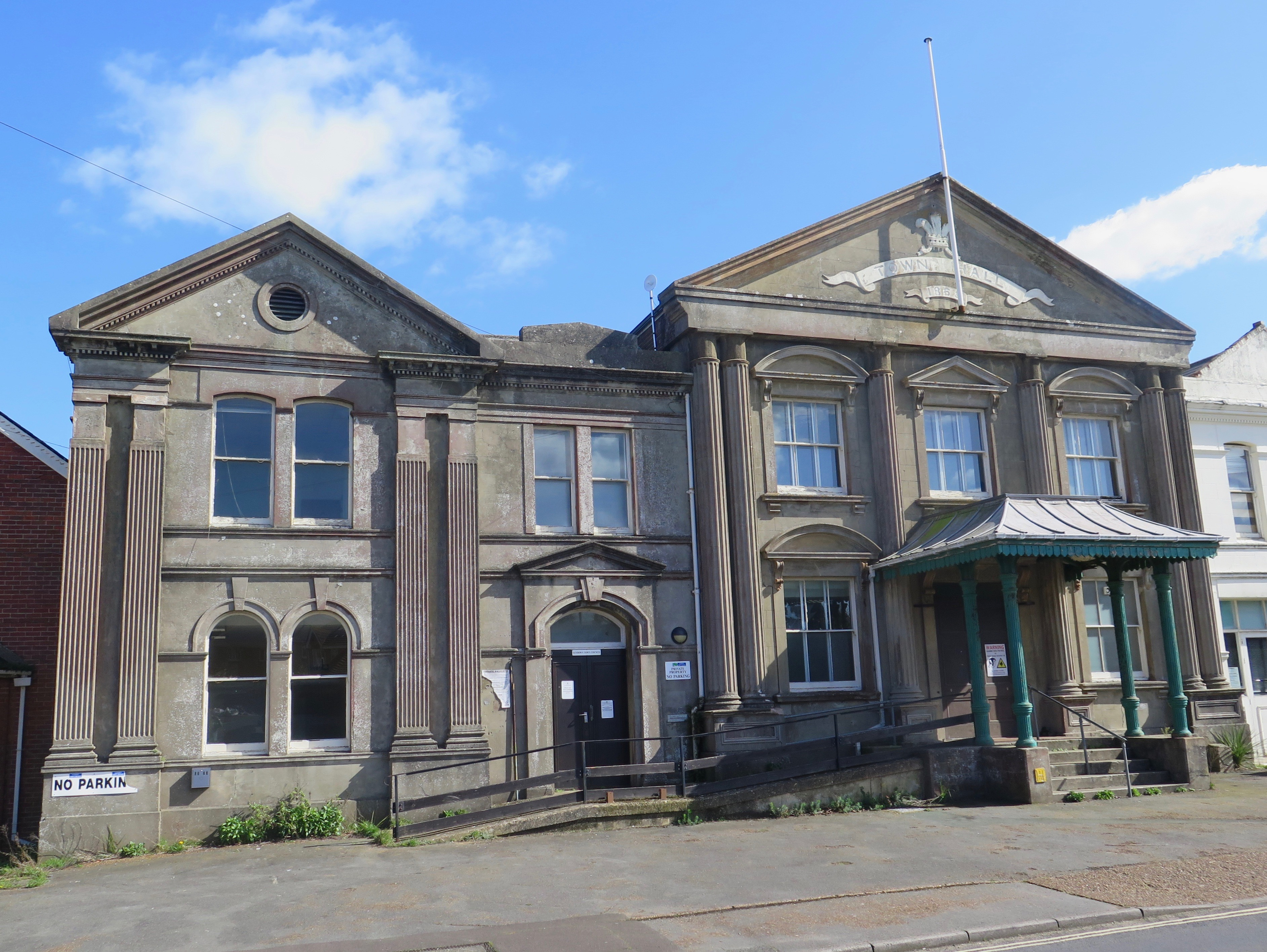
- Sandown Town Hall

- Shown on the Isle of Wight
- 50.6549°N 1.1575°W
- Location: Grafton Street, Sandown

History
- Built: 1869

Site notes
- Architect: Thomas Dowell
- Architectural style: Neoclassical style

Listed Building – Grade II
- Official name: Town Hall
- Designated: 14 February 1992
- Reference no.: 1034283

Sandown Town Hall is a municipal building in Grafton Street, Sandown, Isle of Wight, England. The structure, which was the meeting place of Sandown Urban District Council, is a Grade II listed building.

== History ==
Following their appointment in 1866, the local board of health decided to commission a new civic building for the town: the site they selected was open land on the east side of Grafton Street. The new building was designed by the local architect, Thomas Dowell, in the neoclassical style, built in ashlar stone at a cost of £1,278 and was completed in 1869.

The design involved an asymmetrical main frontage with six bays facing onto Grafton Street; the right hand section of three bays featured a doorway with a wrought-iron canopy flanked by sash windows with segmental pediments. The first floor was also fenestrated by sash windows, the central window bearing a triangular pediment and the outer windows bearing segmental pediments. The windows were flanked by full-height Doric order columns supporting an entablature and a pediment with the Prince of Wales's feathers and the inscription "Town Hall 1869" in the tympanum. The left hand section of two bays featured round headed windows on the ground floor and segmental windows on the first floor flanked by full-height pilasters supporting an open pediment with an oculus in the tympanum. The central section featured a doorway with a fanlight, a keystone and a pediment on the ground floor and two square headed windows on the first floor; the central section was surmounted by a dentiled cornice and a parapet. Internally, the principal room was the main hall with capacity for 520 people.

A fire station was completed on an adjacent site to the south of the town hall in 1879. Following significant growth in the population, largely associated with the fishing industry, the area became an urban district with the town hall as its headquarters in 1894. The building was also used as an events venue by Sandown Amateur Operatic and Dramatic Society which was founded just before the First World War. The town hall continued to serve as the headquarters of Sandown Urban District Council and, from 1933, of the Sandown-Shanklin Urban District Council but ceased to be the local seat of government when the council relocated to Shanklin Town Hall in the 1940s. However, Sandown Town Hall continued to be used as an events venue and in the mid-1960s performers included the soul band, Jimmy James and the Vagabonds.

Following implementation of the Local Government Act 1972, ownership of the building passed to South Wight District Council in 1974. It was then acquired by Isle of Wight County Council in 1982, before being transferred to the new unitary authority, Isle of Wight Council in 1995. The building was adapted for occupation as an indoor bowls centre for senior citizens and later as a youth centre and the latter use continued until the building was vacated in June 2017.

Although Sandown Town Council considered using the town hall as its principal meeting place, the town council chose instead to redevelop the Broadway Centre in 2018. A local art curator, Simon Avery, suggested, in July 2020, that the town hall may contain murals by the Victorian artist, Henry Tooth. However, Isle of Wight Council decided, in March 2021, to grant planning permission to convert the building for residential use and then, in September 2021, decided to sell the building to a developer.
