= St Paul's Church, Gatten, Shanklin =

Church on the Isle of Wight, England

Coordinates: 50°37′57″N 01°10′42″W

St. Paul's Church, Gatten, Shanklin
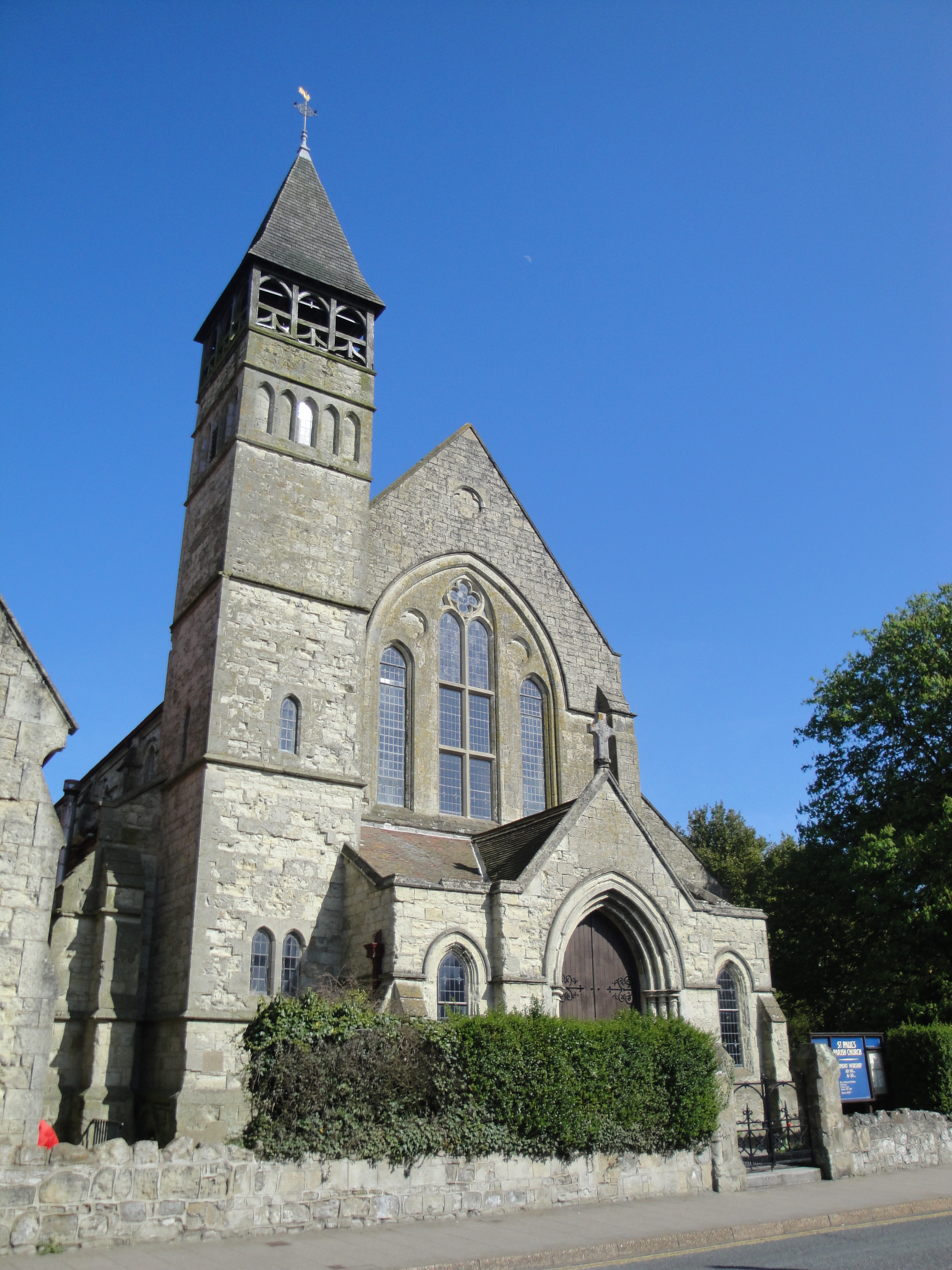
- St. Paul's Church, Gatten, Shanklin
- Denomination: Church of England
- Churchmanship: evangelical

History
- Dedication: St. Paul

Administration
- Province: Canterbury
- Diocese: Portsmouth
- Parish: Shanklin

Clergy
- Vicar: the Rev. Philip Allen

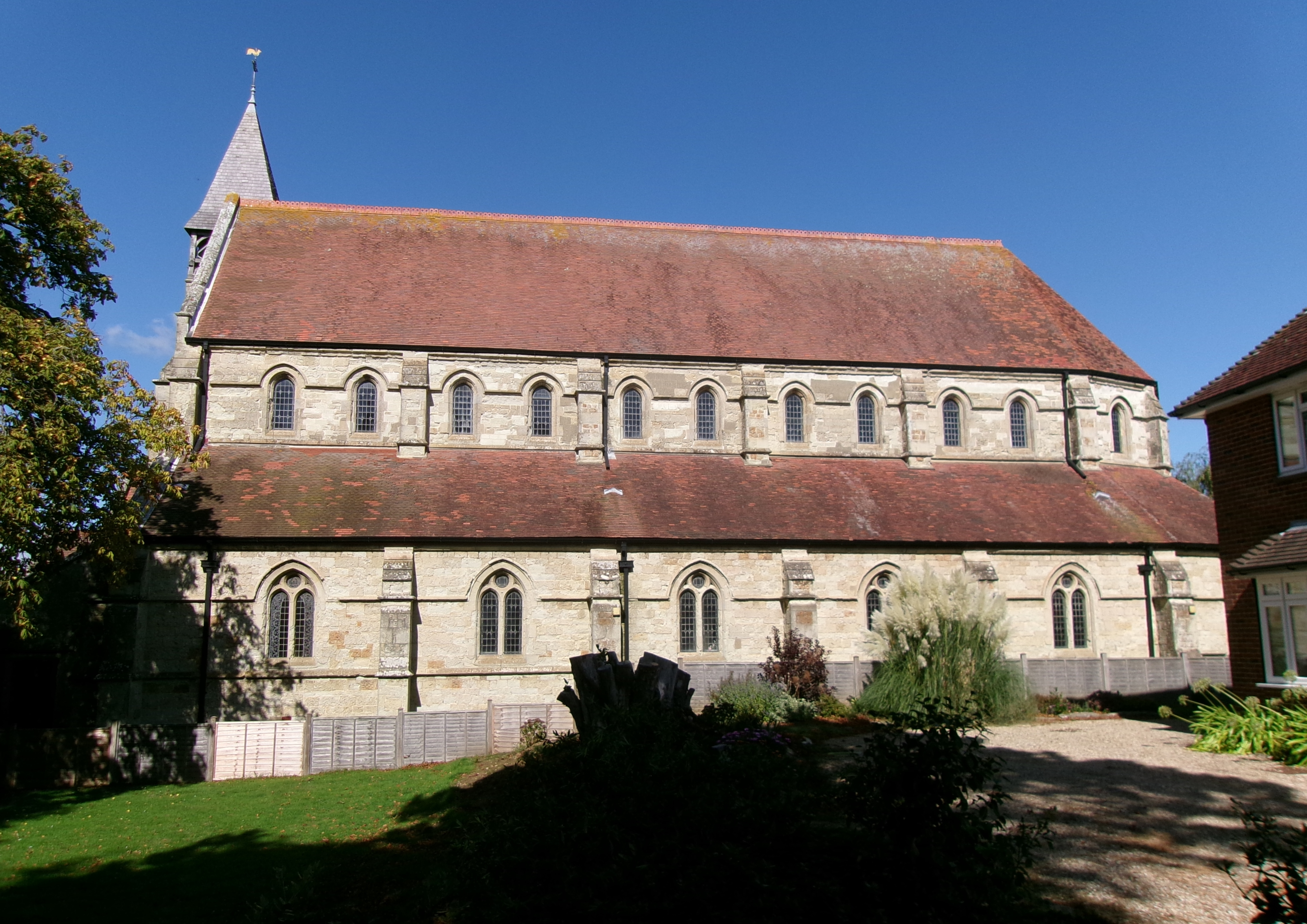
South face of the church

St. Paul's Church, Gatten, Shanklin is a parish church in the Church of England located in Shanklin, Isle of Wight.

== History ==
It is an ecclesiastical parish taken out of Sandown in 1876. The church was built 1880–90, and has an apsidal chancel, a nave with aisles of five bays and a stone tower at the north angle.

The church was designed by the architect C. L. Luck.

St. Paul's Church has the bell from HMS Eurydice (1843), which sank off Dunnose Point and is the subject of a poem by Gerard Manley Hopkins.

During a WW2 enemy air-raid on the town on 17 February 1943, a bomb passed horizontally through the church exploding in the vicarage killing Rev. R B Irons and all the other occupants. The church was re-opened in February 1947.

== Organ ==
The pipe organ dates from 1882 by the builder Forster and Andrews. A specification of the organ can be found on the National Pipe Organ Register.
