= Shanklin Theatre =

Municipal building in Shanklin, Isle of Wight, England

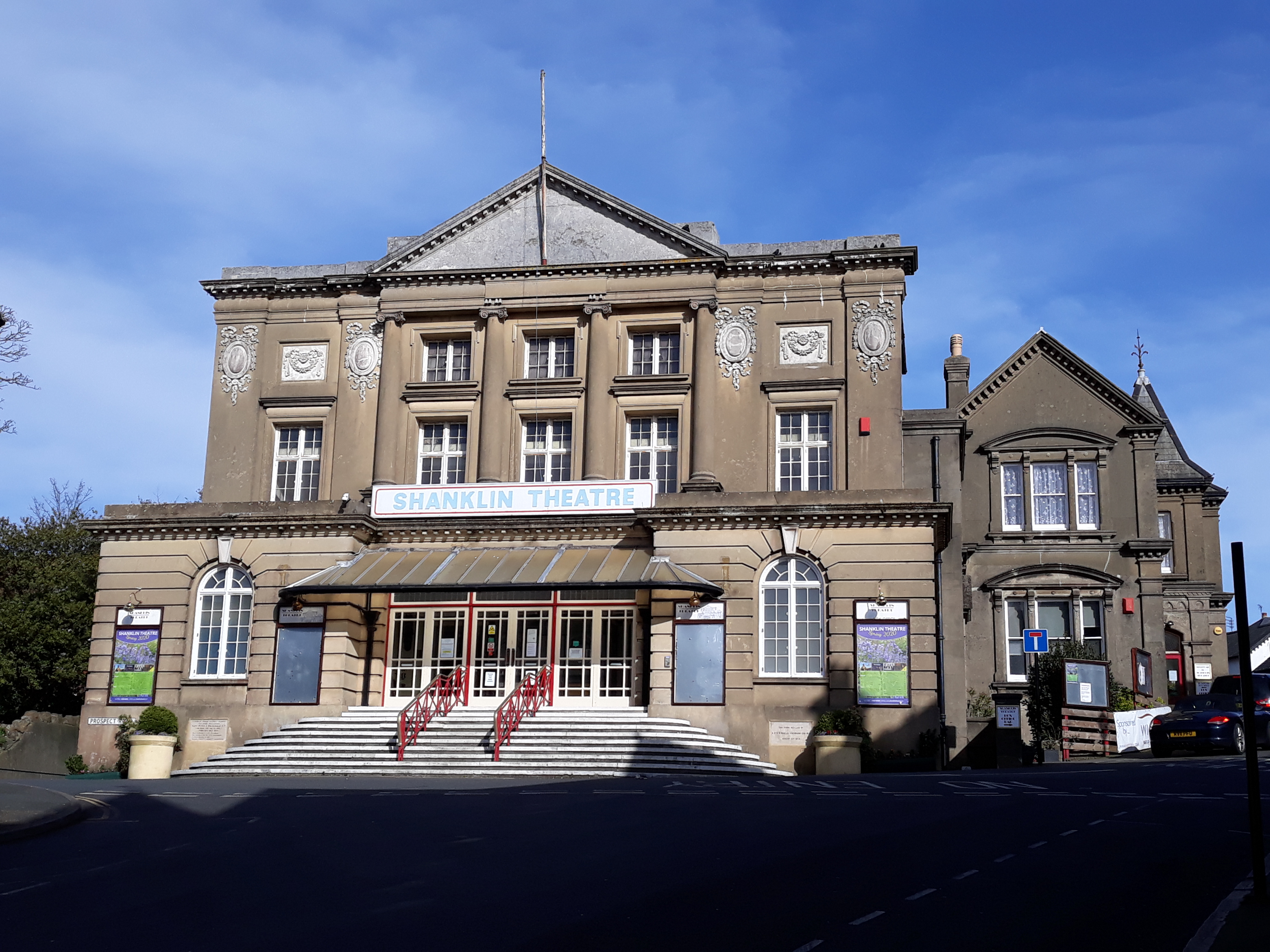
- The building in 2020

- Shown on the Isle of Wight
- 50.6277°N 1.1787°W
- Location: Prospect Road, Shanklin

History
- Built: 1879

Site notes
- Architect: E. G. Cooper
- Architectural style: Neoclassical style

Listed Building – Grade II
- Official name: The Shanklin Theatre and Former Town Hall
- Designated: 3 February 2010
- Reference no.: 1393657

The Shanklin Theatre is an entertainment venue in Prospect Road in Shanklin, a town on the Isle of Wight in England. The building, which incorporates the former Shanklin Town Hall, is a Grade II listed building.

== History ==
The oldest part of the complex was commissioned as The Shanklin Literary & Scientific Institute. The site selected, which was a prominent location at the top of Steephill Road, was dominated by a windmill in the early 17th century. It was donated to the institute by the lord of the manor, Francis White-Popham of Shanklin Manor. The foundation stone was laid by the local member of parliament, Alexander Baillie-Cochrane, on 6 August 1878. The new building was designed by a local architect, E. G. Cooper, in the neoclassical style, built in ashlar stone and was completed in 1879. The design of the building, which was originally single-storey, involved a symmetrical main frontage of five bays facing down Steephill Road. It featured a hexastyle portico formed by six Corinthian order columns supporting an entablature, a cornice and, across the central three bays, a pediment with the word "Institute" inscribed in the tympanum.

In 1884, the building was extended in the Gothic Revival style, with a reading room and an amusement room being added. In 1913, the extension was converted for municipal use by Shanklin Urban District Council, although the main part of the building was used for concerts and theatrical performances. Performers at that time included operatic baritone, Powis Pinder, who took part in an evening of entertainment in 1915.

In 1925, the complex was badly damaged in a fire, and the council subsequently decided to remodel it. The foundation stone for a new three-storey main façade was laid by the then local member of parliament, Peter Macdonald, on 28 February 1933. Meanwhile, the new combined Sandown-Shanklin Urban District Council was formed at Sandown Town Hall later in 1933. The reconstruction of Shanklin Town Hall was carried out to a design by Cooper & Corbett in the French neoclassical style at a cost of £13,000, but it also included an extension incorporating a 700-seat theatre, which opened in 1934.

The building resumed the role of local authority headquarters when the council relocated to Shanklin Town Hall in the 1940s. During the Second World War, the building was used as an ARP control centre as well as a dance venue. However, the building ceased to be the local seat of government again when South Wight Borough Council was formed in Newport in 1974. It continued to be used by the new council for the delivery of local services until 1995, when the new unitary authority, Isle of Wight Council, was formed.

Isle of Wight Council proposed the closure and demolition of the building in 2008 but, after extensive negotiations, the building was acquired by the newly-formed Shanklin Theatre and Community Trust in March 2013. Since then the trust has carried out various improvements to the building including the replacement of the seating in the auditorium.

== Architecture ==
The main west-facing façade is in the French neoclassical style and involves five bays. On the ground floor, it is rusticated and projected forward to form a foyer. There is a short flight of steps leading up to three pairs of double panel doors with a wide glass canopy above. On the upper floors, the central section of three bays is slightly projected forward. The central section is fenestrated by cross-windows on the first floor and by bi-partite windows on the second floor, flanked by four Ionic order pilasters supporting a pediment. The outer bays are fenestrated by cross windows on the first floor and decorated by panels containing swags on the second floor. At the rear there is a tall fly tower. The south front contains a fragment of the 1878 building. The building was grade II listed in 2010.
