= Joe Plumb =

- Joe Plumb as Hook in the play Neverland, 2025
- Occupations: Actor, playwright, theatre director
- Years active: 2018–present
- Known for: Founder & Artistic Director of Horse Box Theatre Company; Creative Programming & Operations Manager at Department, Ryde

Joe Plumb is a British actor, playwright, theatre director, and arts administrator based in Ryde, Isle of Wight. He is the founder and artistic director of the Horse Box Theatre Company and serves as the Creative Programming and Operations Manager for the arts venue Department in Ryde.

== Career ==
Plumb worked as a drama teacher on the Isle of Wight before being appointed as the first artistic director of Skye Bridge Studios in the Highlands of Scotland.

In 2018, Plumb founded the Horse Box Theatre Company, a nomadic performance group that stages original plays and site-specific theatrical works from a converted horse box as well as traditional venue spaces.

Plumb joined the carnival arts organisation Shademakers UK in 2022 as a movement director for the Platinum Jubilee Pageant in London. He subsequently took up the role of Creative Programming and Operations Manager at Department, an arts and culture centre established in the former Elizabeth Pack department store building on Cross Street in Ryde.

In addition to his stage work, Plumb serves as a columnist for the newspaper the Isle of Wight County Press. He has also served as chair of Isle of Wight Pride.

== Theatrical works ==
His theatrical works include:

- Spirit of the Place (2020) – a sonic performance about Ryde, directed by Plumb, combining real and fictional voices and experienced at locations along Union Street.
- The People's Republic of the Isle of Wight (2021) – a satirical theatrical production written and performed by Plumb, combining cabaret, interactive theatre, music, and comedy. It toured venues across the Isle of Wight, including Ryde, Northwood, and the Ventnor Fringe in July 2021.
- Frankenstein: The Creation of a Monster (2022) – an immersive theatrical production staged by Horse Box Theatre Company at Department, Ryde.
- Bob: The Half A Sausage Musical (2023) – a satirical, all-singing, all-dancing parody charting the life and times of the Island's MP Bob Seely, staged by Horse Box Theatre at Quay Arts in November 2023, featuring Plumb as part of the cast.
- Ryde Boy (2023) – a theatrical production produced by Plumb at Department, Ryde.
- Sunset Boulevard (2024) – a musical production staged by Horse Box Theatre Company at Shanklin Theatre in November 2024, directed by Plumb (who also appeared in a cameo role as Cecil B. DeMille).
- Some Mothers Do 'Ave 'Em (2025) – a stage adaptation of the sitcom created by Ray Allen, staged at Department, Ryde in April and May 2025, featuring Plumb as part of the cast, and later that year at Shanklin Theatre.
- Re:Tell (2025) – a series of verbatim plays written by Plumb, based on oral histories of the former Packs department store in Ryde. The production opened at Department on 15 March 2025 and ran on Saturdays through April.
- Two-Stroke (2025) – a musical written by Plumb, timed for Ryde's Scooter Weekend and staged at Department, Ryde in August 2025.
- The Feast of Miss Greenaway (2025) – an immersive Halloween theatrical and dining experience staged at Department, Ryde, featuring a story concept and script by Plumb.
- Neverland (2025) – an immersive Christmas pantomime retelling of J.M. Barrie's classic tale, produced by Shademakers and staged at Department, Ryde in December 2025.
- Kes (2026) – a three-person stage adaptation directed by Plumb, who also starred as "The Man", performed at Department, Ryde in April 2026.
- Special Measures (2026) – a classroom comedy written and directed by Plumb, set in a secondary school's English department. It was staged at Department, Ryde, in July 2026 prior to transferring to Shanklin Theatre.
- Ryde Girl (2026) – a sequel to Ryde Boy, staged alongside it as a double bill at Department, Ryde.
