= South Wight Borough Council elections =

Local government elections in the Isle of Wight, England

South Wight was a non-metropolitan district in Isle of Wight, England. It was abolished on 1 April 1995 and replaced by Isle of Wight Council.

== Political control ==
From the first election to the council in 1973 until its abolition in 1995, political control of the council was held by the following parties:

Party in control	Years
Independent	1973–1983
Conservative	1983–1987
No overall control	1987–1995

== Council elections ==
- 1973 South Wight Borough Council election
- 1976 South Wight Borough Council election
- 1979 South Wight Borough Council election (New ward boundaries)
- 1983 South Wight Borough Council election
- 1987 South Wight Borough Council election (Borough boundary changes took place but the number of seats remained the same)
- 1991 South Wight Borough Council election
