= Shanklin =

Town on the Isle of Wight, England

Coordinates: 50°38′00″N 1°10′30″W

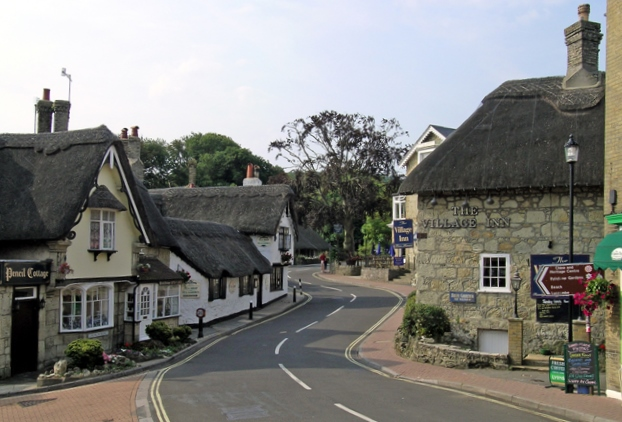
- Shanklin Old Village

- Location within the Isle of Wight
- Population: 9,123 (2021 Census)
- OS grid reference: SZ584816
- Civil parish: Shanklin
- Unitary authority: Isle of Wight
- Ceremonial county: Isle of Wight
- Region: South East
- Country: England
- Sovereign state: United Kingdom
- Post town: SHANKLIN
- Postcode district: PO37
- Dialling code: 01983
- Police: Hampshire and Isle of Wight
- Fire: Hampshire and Isle of Wight
- Ambulance: Isle of Wight
- UK Parliament: Isle of Wight East

Shanklin (/ˈʃæŋklɪn/) is a seaside resort town and civil parish on the Isle of Wight, England, located on Sandown Bay. Shanklin is the southernmost of three settlements which occupy the bay, and is close to Lake and Sandown. The sandy beach, its Old Village and a wooded ravine, Shanklin Chine, are its main attractions. The esplanade along the beach is occupied by hotels and restaurants for the most part, and is one of the most tourist-oriented parts of the town. The other is the Old Village, at the top of Shanklin Chine. Together with Lake and Sandown to the north, Shanklin forms a built up area of around 25,000 inhabitants, Shanklin alone contributing around 9,123 of this.

== History ==
The name Shanklin derives from the Old English scenc and hlinc. meaning 'the bank by the drinking cup', referring to Shanklin Chine.

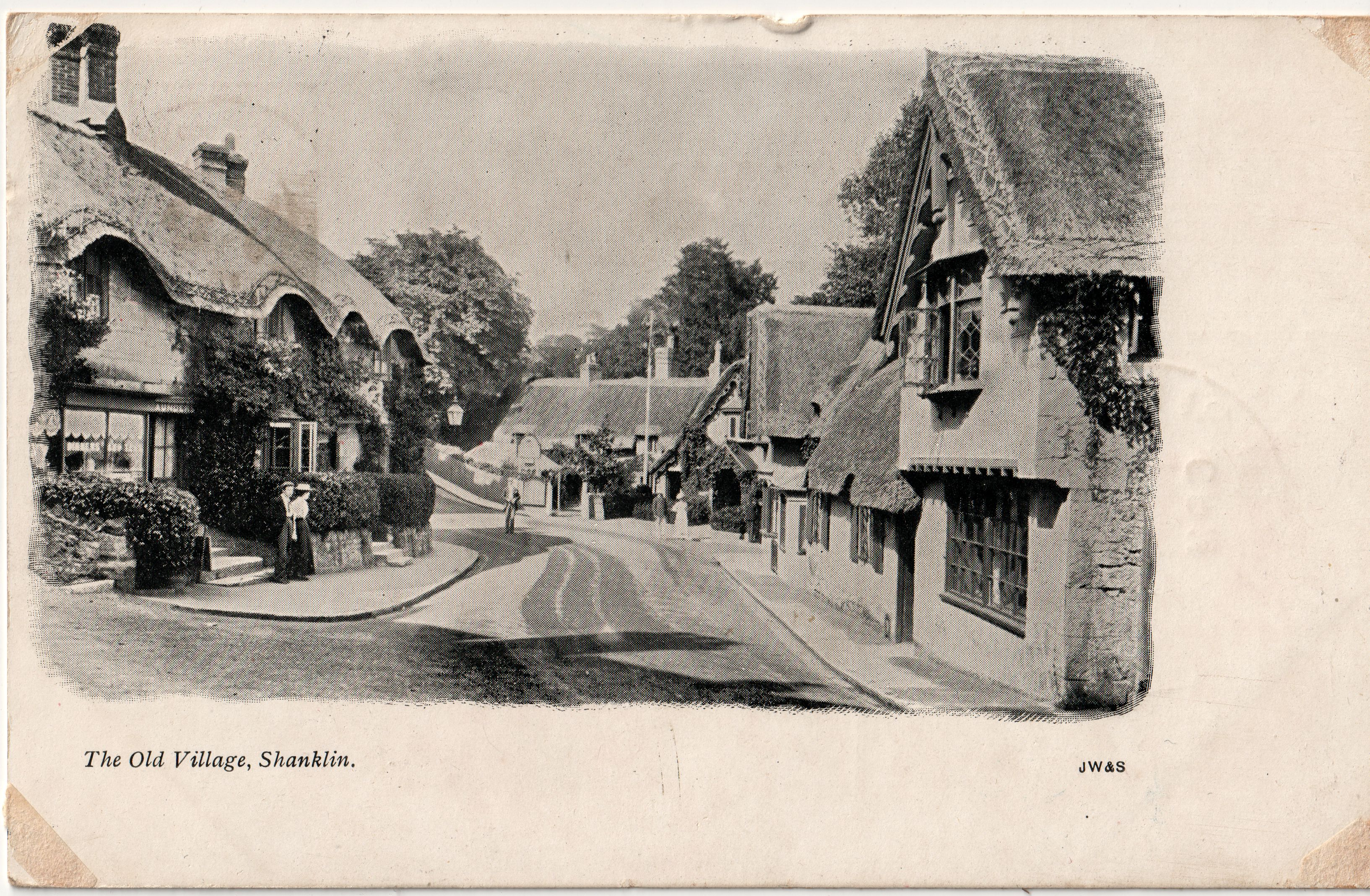
The Old Village in Shanklin about 1903

Prior to the Norman Conquest, the settlement of Shanklin was owned by a man named Algar and a half a dozen other free men, with King Edward the Confessor being its overlord. By the time the Domesday Book was created (1086), Shanklin had a population of 17 households and it was divided between Jocelyn and William, both the sons of a Saxon landowner named Azur. It was known as Sencliz or Senclis.

On 24 August 1940, a badly damaged Messerschmitt Bf109E, piloted by Feldwebel Gerhardt Ebus, based at Beaumont-le-Roger, Normandy, crashed at Greatwoods Copse, south of Shanklin. Hedley Vinall, who worked in the Surveyor's Department in the Sandown-Shanklin Urban District Council, was a witness of the crash, he said:

My uncle was a farmer at Cliff Farm, Shanklin, and he had a spare piece of land right at the top of Victoria Avenue, about half a mile [800 m] north of Greatwoods, which was one of the council's water-gathering areas. I was on my uncle's land this Saturday afternoon with a friend; we were watching the air raids going into Portsmouth and saw numerous enemy aircraft attacked. This particular plane was obviously in trouble. It was getting lower and lower. We watched the pilot coming down on his parachute, drifting towards Shanklin. The plane levelled out near us, then passed over the top of us, then disappeared. We knew it must have come down nearby, so we got on our bikes and shot down Victoria Avenue, Westhill Road and Cowlease, which runs along Greatwoods.

On the way they met a council colleague who told them he had been at the Greatwoods reservoirs when the plane had crashed through the canopy of trees and into an old well. His colleague set off to notify the police. Headley adds:

The plane had made a fair-sized hole in the tree cover and, sure enough, had gone right into this well, which was about 2.5 metres (8 feet) across and covered with sleepers and the like. It had gone in at an angle; the pieces of the wings and the tail fin were sticking out of the well, and there were other bits of debris lying all around it. I remember seeing cannon shells pitted in the trees nearby, which had presumably been thrown out by force when the plane hit the well. A military unit arrived and put a guard on it; those cannon shells were dropping everywhere!

Much of the Messerschmitt's fuselage and all of the engine had fallen into the well, and were eventually removed. Some parts, including a cannon, were removed ~40 years later.

In 1894 Shanklin became an urban district, from 1898 the district contained only the parish of Shanklin. On 1 April 1933 the district and parish were abolished to form Sandown-Shanklin. In 1974 "Sandown-Shanklin" became an unparished area in South Wight district. On 1 April 1984 Shanklin became a parish again. In 1995 it became part of the Isle of Wight unitary authority area.

== Shopping ==
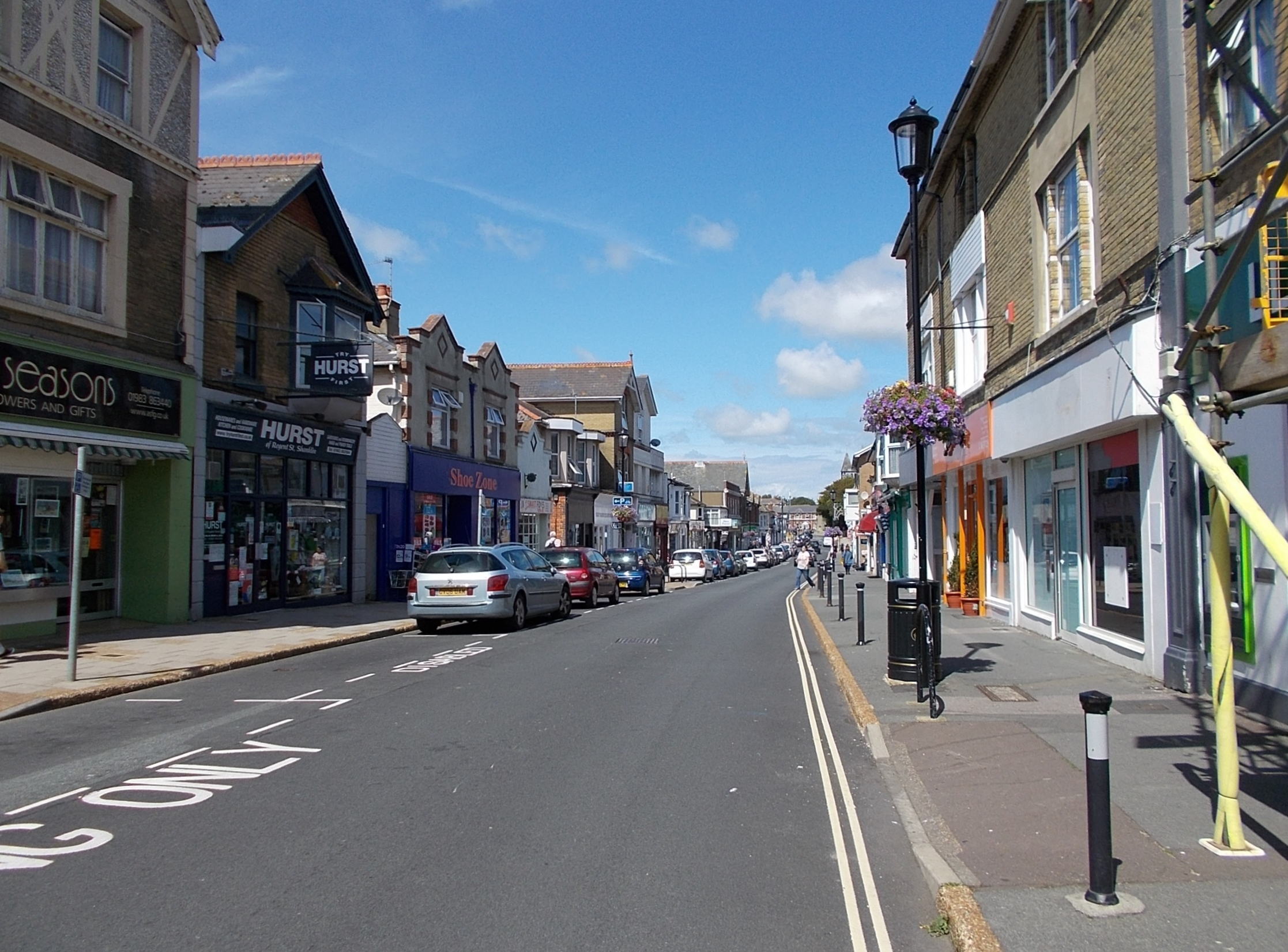
Regent Street

The main shopping centre consists of two roads, Regent Street and High Street, which together comprise the largest retail area in the south of the Isle of Wight; significant for tourists but also as an amenity for residents.

Near Regent Street are the town's two main supermarkets, the Co-op and Lidl. In Regent Street itself are many local shops, including two arts and crafts shops, several clothing and sports shops, three newsagents and three bakeries. The high street also has some local shops, but is dominated by tourist shops and restaurants.

== Transport ==
Shanklin railway station is the terminus of the Island Line from Ryde, opened on 23 August 1864. The railway was extended south to Ventnor in 1866, but this section was closed in 1966. The line from Ryde to Shanklin is now operated by former London Underground tube trains. In October 2004 a direct link was revived in the form of a bus service named the "Rail link". This was discontinued in 2010 but was replaced by the Southern Vectis number 3 bus.

Bus services to nearby towns and suburbs are run by Southern Vectis, mainly on routes 2, 3, 22 and 24, principally from the bus stands at the Co-op supermarket. Destinations served include Newchurch, Newport, Ryde, Sandown, Ventnor and Winford. In the summer, an open top bus route called "The Sandown Bay Tour" is run, serving the main tourist areas of Shanklin and running to Sandown.

== Culture ==
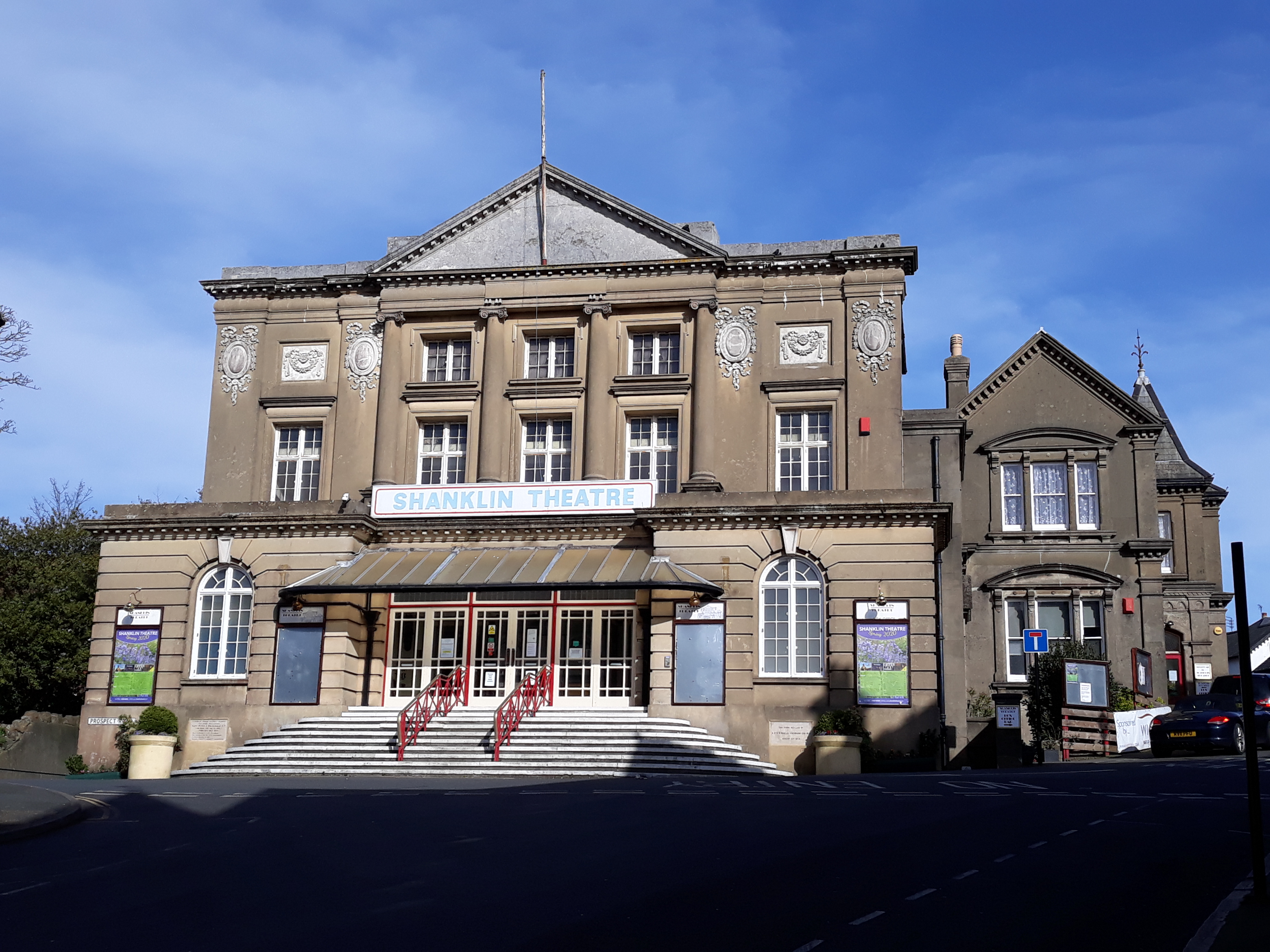
Shanklin Theatre

Shanklin has one theatre, Shanklin Theatre, which is just off the top end of the High Street.

In July and August 1819 the poet John Keats lodged at Eglantine Cottage in the resort's High Street, where he completed the first book of Lamia and began a drama, Otho the Great, with his friend Charles Armitage Brown.

In July 1868 the American poet Henry Wadsworth Longfellow stayed at the Crab Inn in Shanklin's Old Village during his last visit to Europe and left a poem about it on a stone by the pub. It is not generally held to be amongst his best work.

According to Joseph Jacobs's influential 1890 version of The Three Little Pigs, the Three Pigs and the Wolf live near Shanklin.

Victoria Cross recipient and Deputy Governor of the Isle of Wight, Colonel Henry Gore-Browne retired to Shanklin before his death in 1912.

The 1980s indiepop band Trixie's Big Red Motorbike were from Shanklin, and recorded some of their records there.

In Monty Python's Flying Circus, season 4, "Mr Neutron", Michael Palin plays a US commander who calls upon "Moscow! Peking! and Shanklin, Isle of Wight!". A voice over continues "And so the Great Powers and the people of Shanklin, Isle of Wight, drew their net in ever-tightening circles around the most dangerous threat to peace the world has ever faced."

== Beaches and esplanade ==
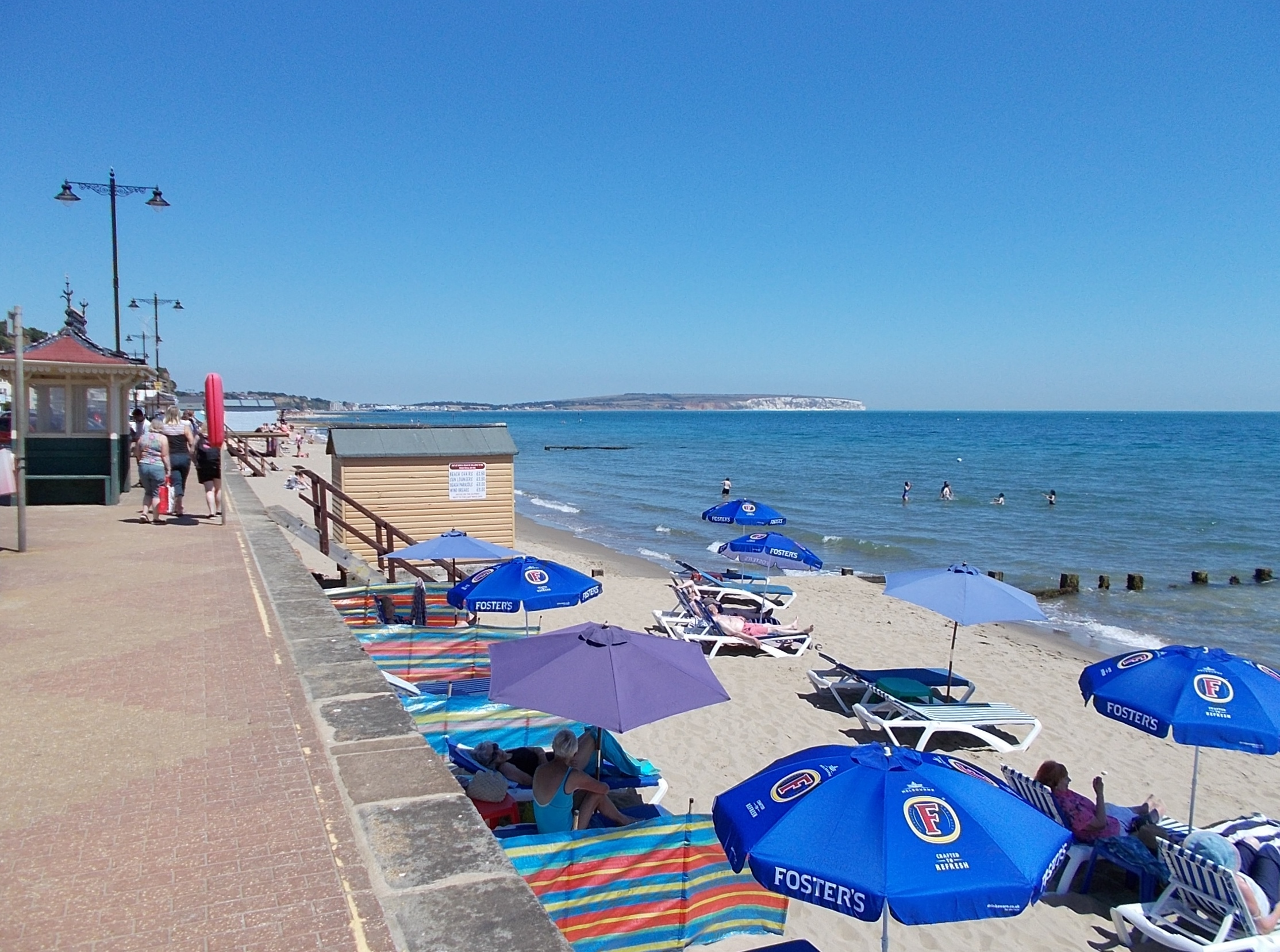
Shanklin beach

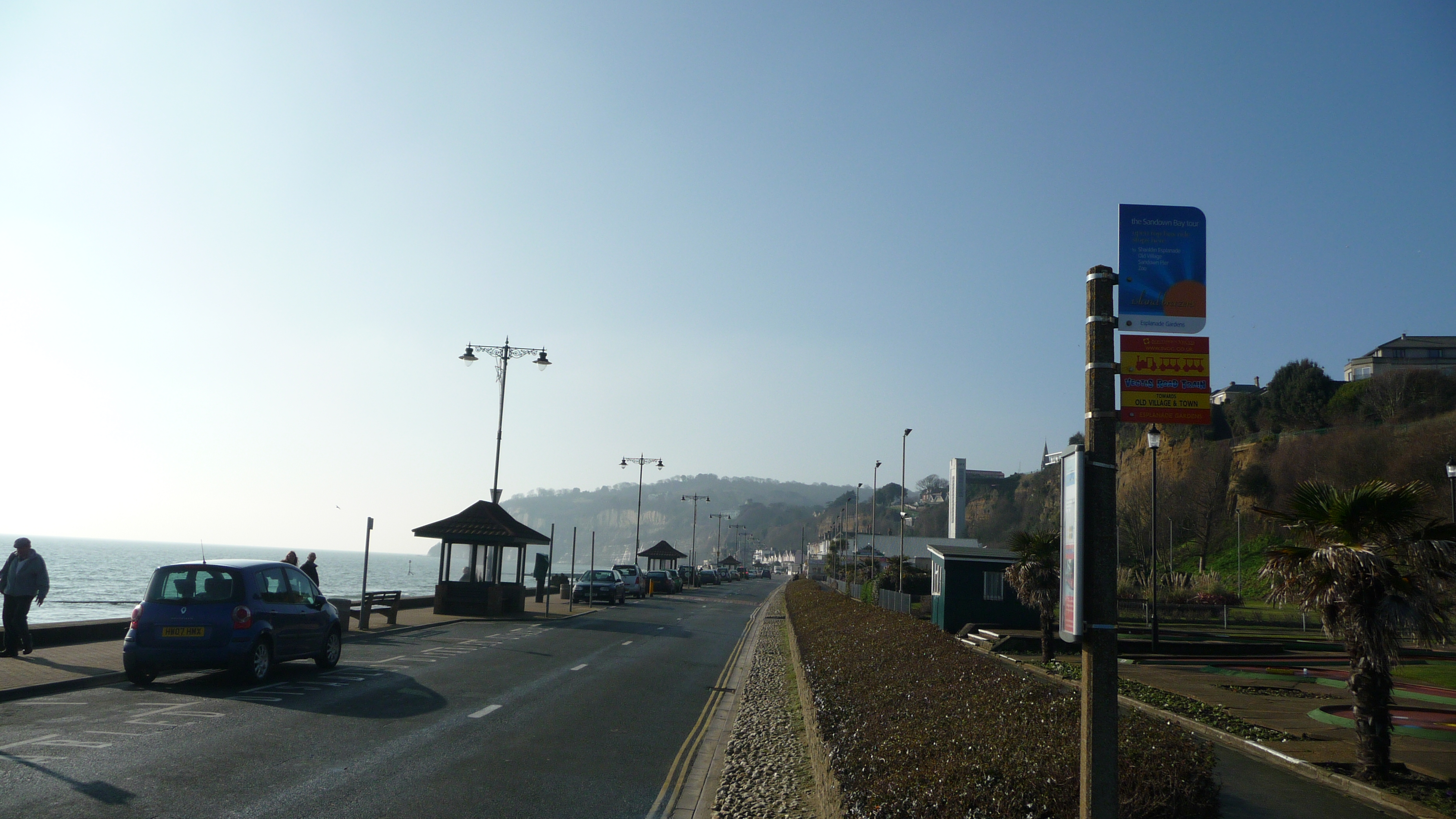
Looking along Shanklin Esplanade

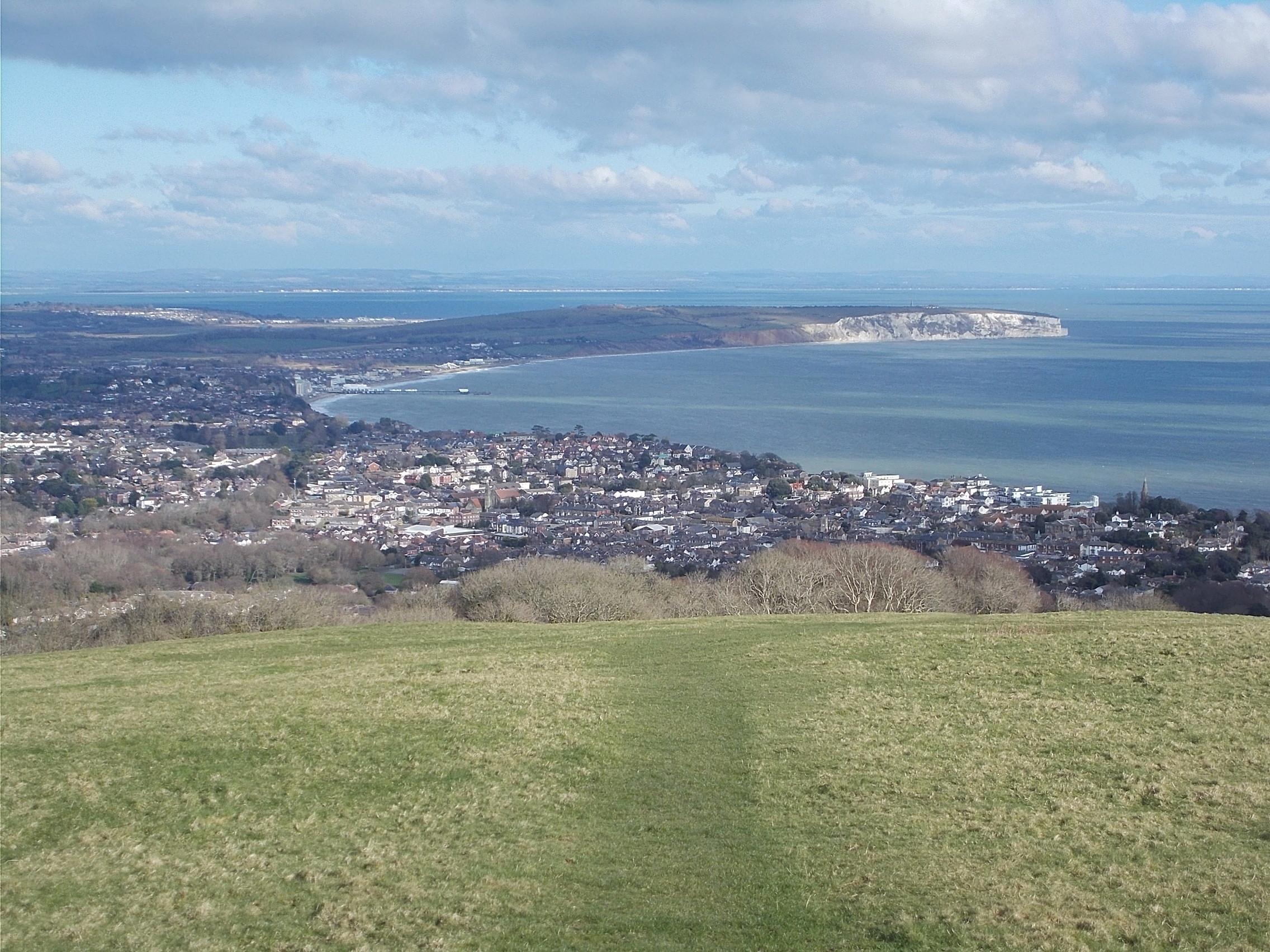
Shanklin (nearest the camera) set on Sandown Bay. Sandown (with pier) is beyond, while between the two settlements lies Lake. Beyond Sandown and to the right of the picture is the white chalk of Culver Cliff.

Shanklin is on the coast of Sandown Bay, and therefore is part of the long beach which spans between Yaverland in the north to Luccombe in the south. The section of beach situated next to Shanklin is split into Small Hope Beach and Hope Beach. Above Hope Beach is the esplanade. Shanklin Pier was destroyed in the Great Storm of 1987. The pier formerly had a theatre at which many famous performers appeared, including Paul Robeson, Richard Tauber and Arthur Askey (whose daughter attended Upper Chine School for Girls). The Summerland Amusement Arcade on the seafront was formerly a seaplane hangar positioned at Bembridge where it housed Fairey Campania seaplanes of the Nizam of Hyderabad's Squadron. Large areas of the seafront were severely damaged or destroyed during the bombing raids of World War II, but were quickly rebuilt after the war, causing the current seafront to be a varied mixture of Victorian, inter-war and post-war architecture.

Shanklin Sailing Club is situated at the North end of the Esplanade. Founded in 1931 as Shanklin Amateur Sailing Club', the club has a fleet of Sprint 15 catamarans and holds races three days a week during the season.

At the south end of the beach is Shanklin Chine, from which the town takes its name, historically "Chynklyng Chine" and in the Domesday Book of 1086 Sencliz (held by William FitzAzor; Jocelyn FitzAzor) from "Scen-hlinc". The chine is operated as a visitor attraction and continues up to Rylstone Gardens in the Old Village. It contains a small section of the pipe of the Operation Pluto pipeline which ran across the Isle of Wight and out from Shanklin and another branch from Sandown to supply fuel to the D-Day beaches.

== Nature ==
America Wood is a Site of Special Scientific Interest located between Shanklin and Whiteley Bank. It is owned by the Woodland Trust. The Great Storm of 1987 and the Burns' Day storm of 1990 felled trees and created many open sections. There is one particularly large glade which is gradually recovering from the storms. The wood is situated just west of Ninham.

Dunnose is a cape situated southwest of the town. An imposing and high geological feature, it has served as a triangulation point for maps of the United Kingdom, and has also been the site of several shipwrecks, including that of HMS Eurydice, which sank with the loss of 300 people aboard.

== Climate ==
Shanklin has an oceanic climate (Cfb) with mild summers, cool nights, rainy winters and average temperature nights. Shanklin is one of the sunniest villages in Great Britain.

Climate data for Shanklin (1991-2020 normals, extremes 1959-2017)
Month	Jan	Feb	Mar	Apr	May	Jun	Jul	Aug	Sep	Oct	Nov	Dec	Year
Record high °C (°F)	13.5 (56.3)	15.0 (59.0)	19.7 (67.5)	24.0 (75.2)	25.6 (78.1)	32.7 (90.9)	30.7 (87.3)	32.2 (90.0)	26.3 (79.3)	25.5 (77.9)	17.1 (62.8)	14.5 (58.1)	32.7 (90.9)
Mean daily maximum °C (°F)	8.5 (47.3)	8.4 (47.1)	10.3 (50.5)	12.9 (55.2)	15.9 (60.6)	18.4 (65.1)	20.5 (68.9)	20.5 (68.9)	18.5 (65.3)	15.2 (59.4)	11.7 (53.1)	9.3 (48.7)	14.2 (57.6)
Daily mean °C (°F)	6.2 (43.2)	5.9 (42.6)	7.4 (45.3)	9.4 (48.9)	12.3 (54.1)	14.9 (58.8)	17.1 (62.8)	17.2 (63.0)	15.3 (59.5)	12.5 (54.5)	9.1 (48.4)	6.9 (44.4)	11.2 (52.2)
Mean daily minimum °C (°F)	3.9 (39.0)	3.4 (38.1)	4.5 (40.1)	6.0 (42.8)	8.8 (47.8)	11.5 (52.7)	13.6 (56.5)	13.8 (56.8)	12.1 (53.8)	9.7 (49.5)	6.6 (43.9)	4.5 (40.1)	8.2 (46.8)
Record low °C (°F)	−8.9 (16.0)	−8.2 (17.2)	−7.2 (19.0)	−3.5 (25.7)	−0.8 (30.6)	3.0 (37.4)	6.5 (43.7)	5.7 (42.3)	4.0 (39.2)	−0.7 (30.7)	−5.3 (22.5)	−6.1 (21.0)	−8.9 (16.0)
Average precipitation mm (inches)	105.1 (4.14)	73.6 (2.90)	60.0 (2.36)	54.0 (2.13)	52.2 (2.06)	54.2 (2.13)	52.3 (2.06)	66.8 (2.63)	72.4 (2.85)	113.4 (4.46)	118.4 (4.66)	118.8 (4.68)	941.2 (37.06)
Average precipitation days (≥ 1.0 mm)	13.3	10.8	9.7	9.0	7.9	7.8	7.5	8.5	9.0	12.6	13.7	13.8	123.7
Mean monthly sunshine hours	69.8	92.8	142.0	207.8	248.1	256.4	268.9	239.6	178.9	123.8	84.1	63.9	1,976
Source 1: Met Office
Source 2: Starlings Roost Weather

== Churches ==
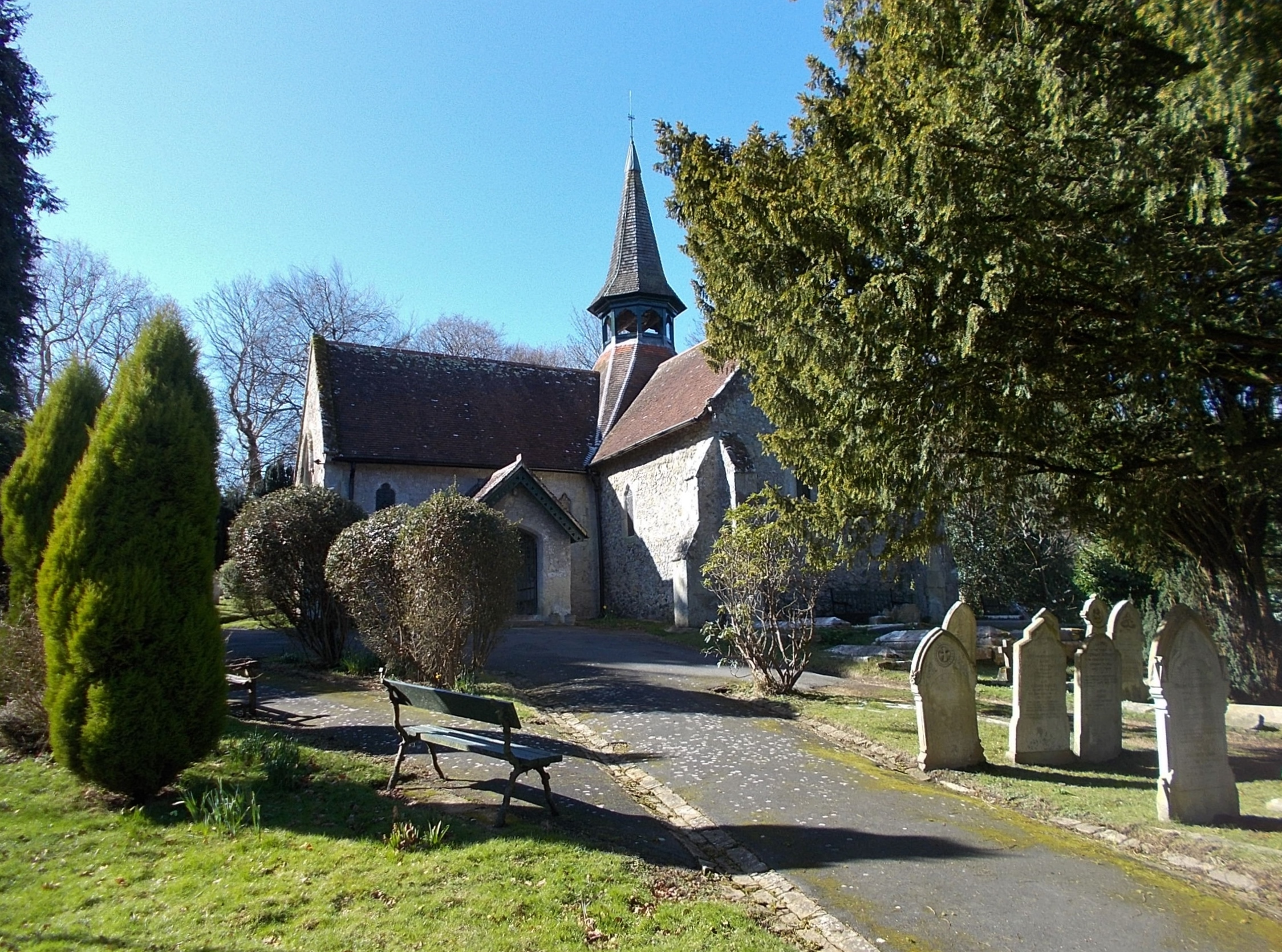
St Blasius Church

There are three Anglican churches in Shanklin. St.Paul's Church in Regent Street has the bell from HMS Eurydice (1843), which sank off Dunnose Point and is the subject of a poem by Gerard Manley Hopkins. St. Blasius Church, Shanklin – better known as Shanklin Old Church – is to the south of the town and has bell ropes hanging in the nave and a fine lych-gate. The Church of St. Saviour-on-the-Cliff, Shanklin is the biggest in the town and is in Queen's Road.

The Isle of Wight United Reformed Church is situated in Shanklin.

== Twin towns ==
Shanklin is twinned with Coupvray, a town in the Île-de-France region of France.

== Sport ==
Shanklin & Godshill Cricket Club play at Westhill Road just outside of the town. Founded in 1871, they recently joined forces with Godshill, and run two competitive weekend teams in the Hampshire and Isle of Wight Leagues.

Shanklin Football Club are based at the County Ground, Green Lane and are affiliated to the Hampshire Football Association. They are long serving members of the Isle of Wight League - a competition they joined as founder members in 1898. In August 1988, the club celebrated their centenary when they hosted FA Cup winners Wimbledon in a friendly match that made the national headlines.
