= The Crab, Shanklin =

Pub in Shanklin, UK

The Crab
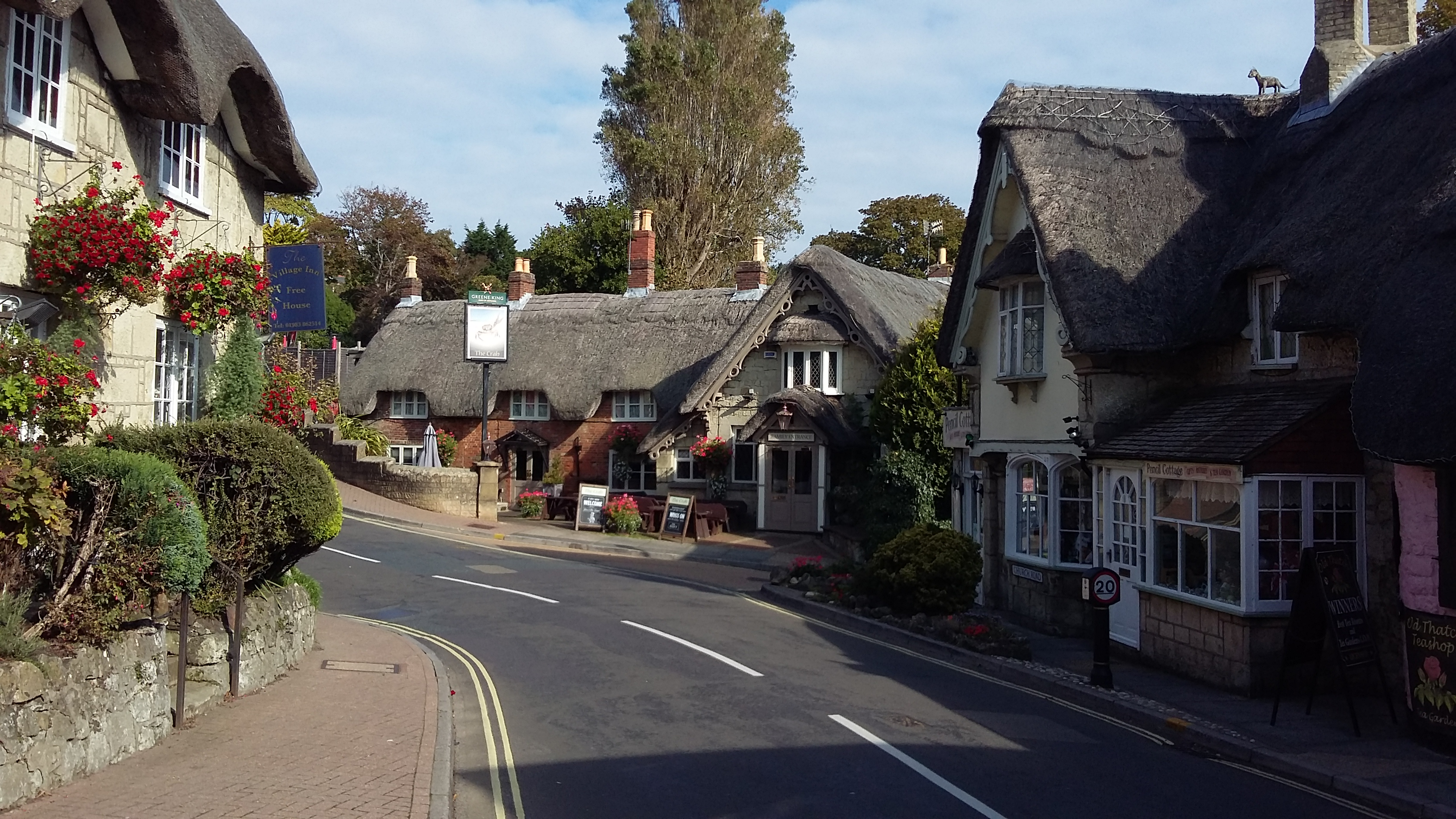
- The Crab (centre)

- Location within Isle of Wight
- 50.62578°N 1.178222°W
- Location: Shanklin, Isle of Wight

Site notes
- Website: The Crab

Listed Building – Grade II
- Official name: The Crab Inn
- Designated: 14 February 1992
- Reference no.: 1212445

The Crab is a pub in Shanklin on the Isle of Wight, off the south coast of the UK.

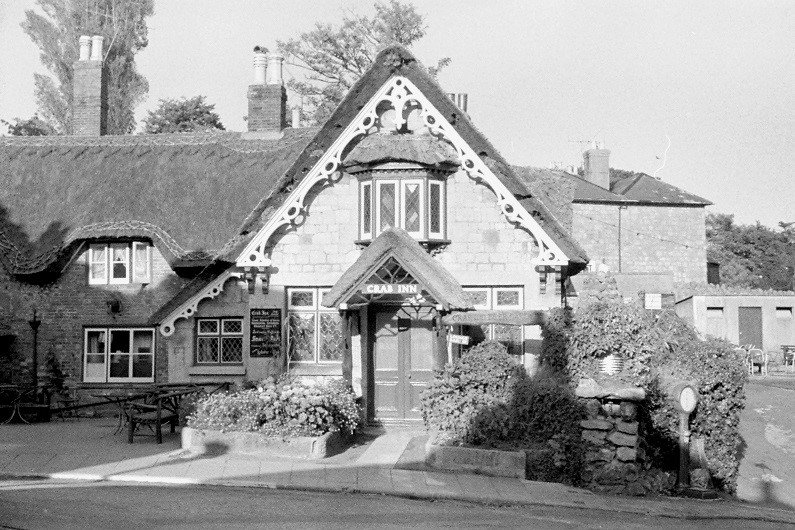
Entrance in 1964

Located in the old village above the beach, as a traditional thatched building surrounded by other old buildings it has often appeared in art; the Shanklin and District History Society describe it as "possibly the most drawn, painted and photographed building on the Island" and CAMRA's notes on the pub comment that it "has adorned many a chocolate box". As of 2026 it is operated by Greene King and has been a grade II listed building since 1992. The Village Inn and Pencil Cottage on either side of it are also listed.
