= Isle of Wight Rural District =

Former local government area in the UK

Coordinates: 50.662°N 1.313°W

The Isle of Wight Rural District was a rural district on the Isle of Wight from 1894 to 1974 covering most of the island, apart from urban areas. In 1933, the area of the district was reduced by the transfer of parts of the civil parishes of Brading, Bonchurch and Yaverland to the newly created Sandown-Shanklin Urban District.

In 1974, under the Local Government Act 1972, it was merged with the Sandown-Shanklin Urban District and the Ventnor Urban District to form the new non-metropolitan South Wight district.
