= Ninham =

Hamlet on the Isle of Wight in the parish of Shanklin

Coordinates: 50.640729°N 1.191979°W

- Hamlet
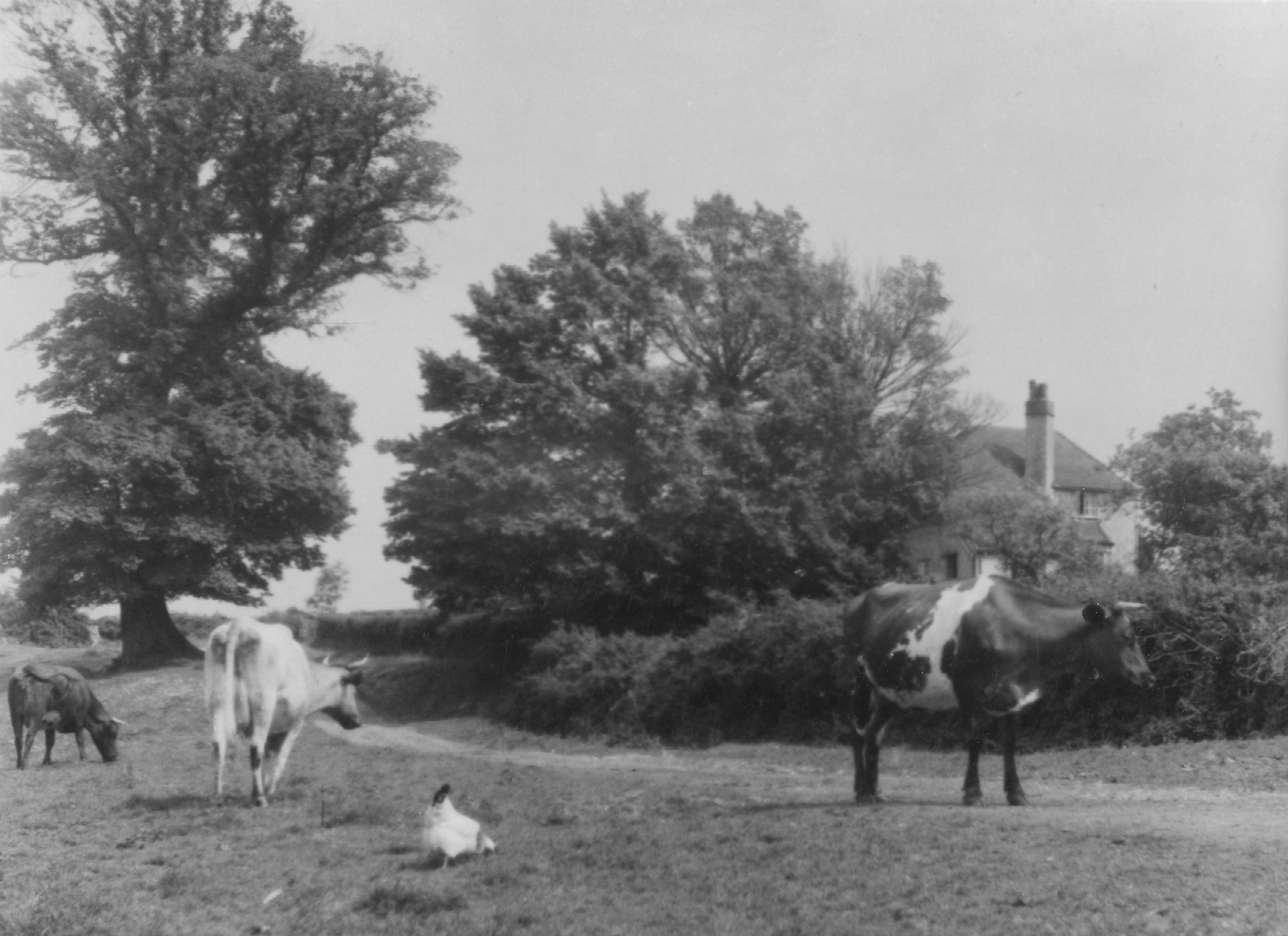
- Cattle grazing in front of a pond at Ninham Farm

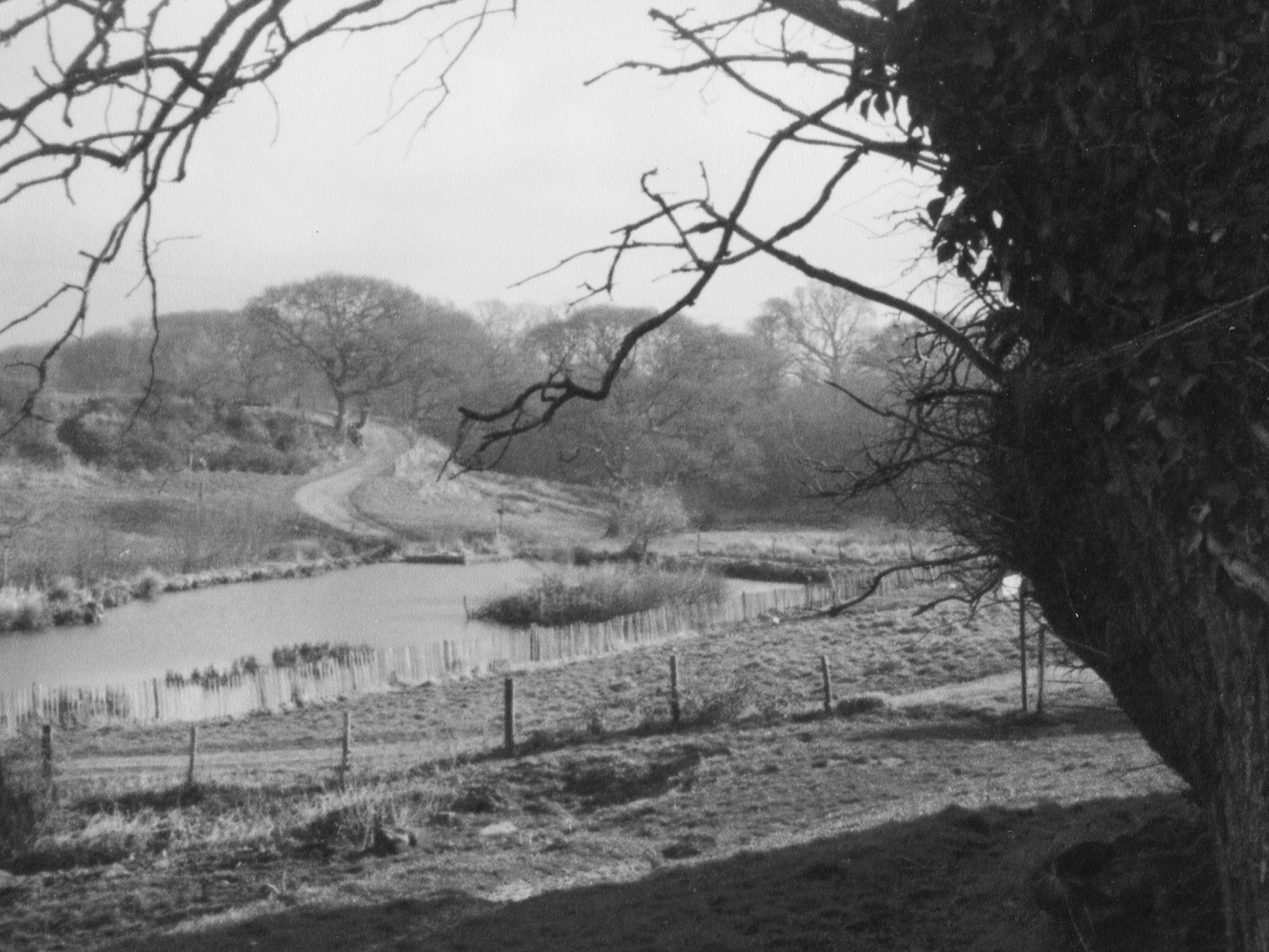
- Black and white photo of a pond at Ninham

- Location within the Isle of Wight
- OS grid reference: SZ5724682570
- Civil parish: Shanklin; Newchurch
- Unitary authority: Isle of Wight
- Ceremonial county: Isle of Wight
- Region: South East
- Country: England
- Sovereign state: United Kingdom
- Post town: SHANKLIN
- Police: Hampshire and Isle of Wight
- Fire: Hampshire and Isle of Wight
- Ambulance: Isle of Wight

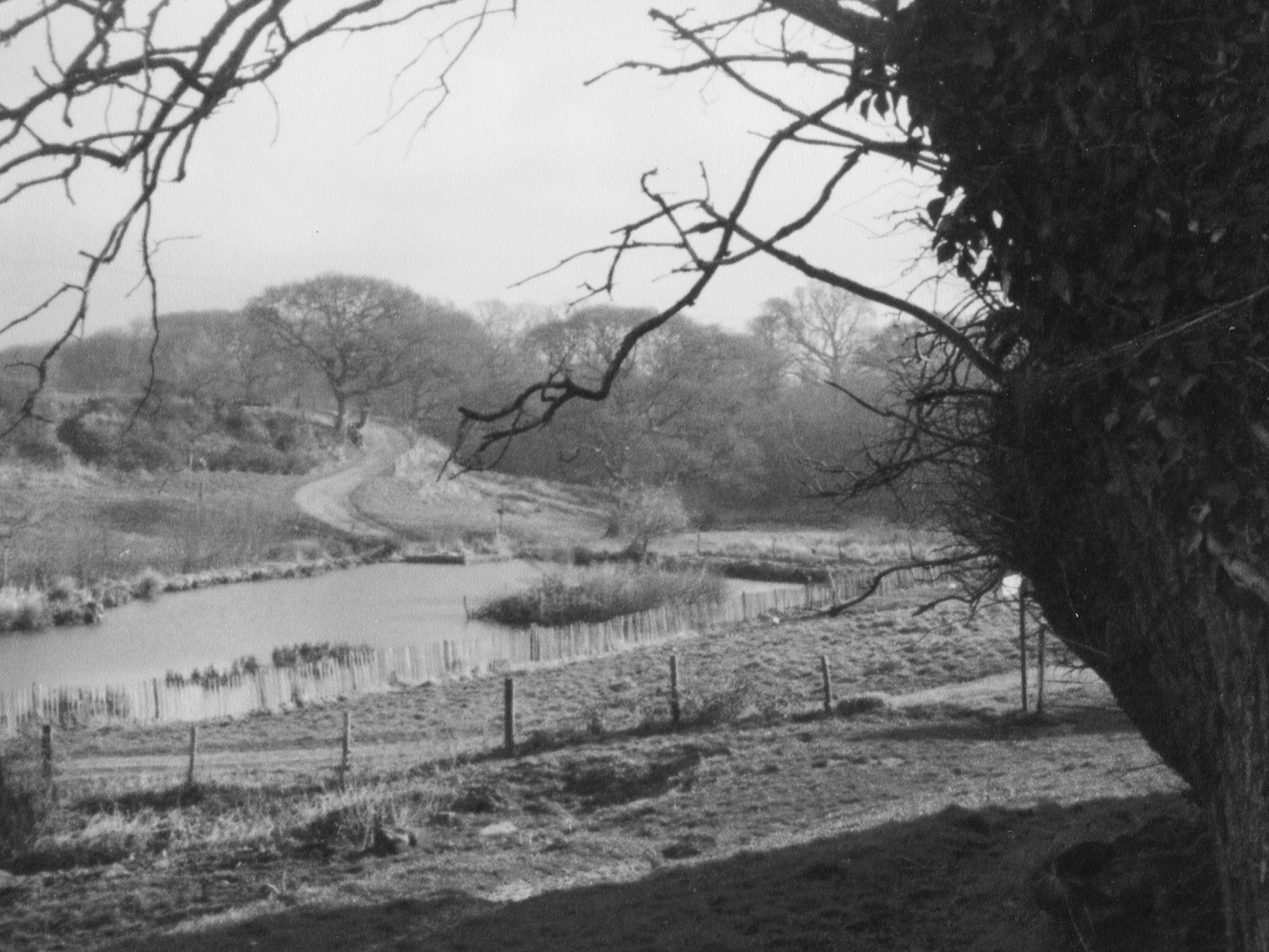
Old black & white photo of pond

Ninham is a hamlet on the Isle of Wight in the parish of Shanklin, and about 2 miles (3.3 km) away from Shanklin, the nearest tourist town.

Ninham postal code is PO37 7PL - and is marked incorrectly on google maps.

It is about 7 miles (12 km) away from Newport, the island's capital.

It is the location of Ninham Farm and it is also the location of Ninham Country Holidays, a campsite.

== Name ==
It takes its name from William Newnham of Newport whose last name was from the lost place-name of Newnham, Chale. Newnham has the same origin as Newnham Farm in Binstead: 'the new homestead or enclosure', from Old English nīwe and hām or hamm.

1566: Newnhams

1619: Newnham

1627: Ninham
