= HMS Eurydice (1843) =

Royal Navy ship, sank 1878

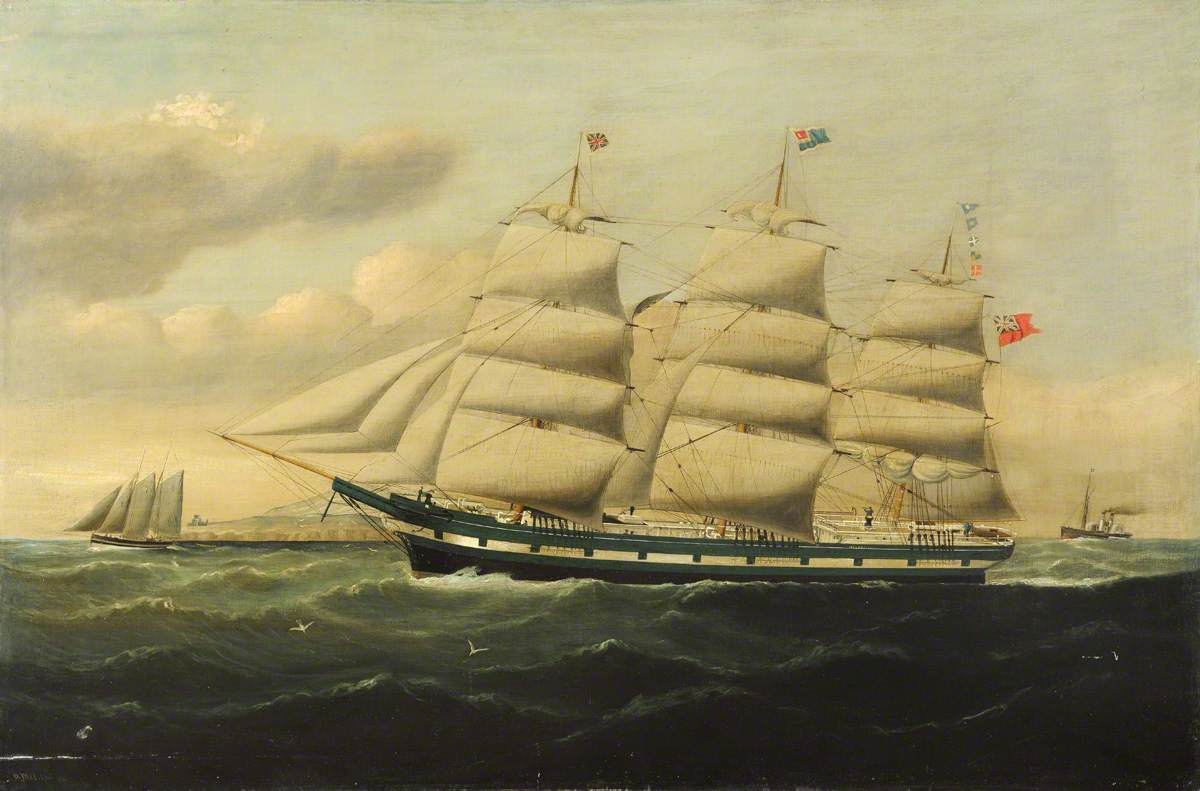
- HMS Eurydice, painted by William Howard Yorke, Liverpool 1871

History

United Kingdom
- Name: HMS Eurydice
- Namesake: The nymph Eurydice, wife of Orpheus
- Ordered: 27 August 1841
- Builder: Portsmouth Dockyard
- Cost: £16,137, plus £9,312 for fitting out
- Laid down: April 1842
- Launched: 16 May 1843
- Completed: 1 September 1843
- Commissioned: 27 June 1843
- Recommissioned: 30 May 1846, 4 April 1854, 7 February 1877
- Fate: Foundered in 1878; Salvaged and broken up that year

General characteristics
- Type: Corvette
- Tons burthen: 910 81/94 bm
- Length: 141 ft 2 in (43.03 m) (gundeck) 117 ft 9.75 in (35.9093 m) (keel)
- Beam: 38 ft 10 in (11.84 m)
- Depth of hold: 8 ft 9 in (2.67 m)
- Sail plan: Full-rigged ship
- Complement: 190
- Armament: Rated for 26 guns; Upperdeck: 18 × 32-pdr (45cwt) long guns; Quarterdeck: 6 × 32-pdr (25cwt) guns; Focsle: 2 × 32-pdr (45cwt) long guns

HMS Eurydice was a 26-gun Royal Navy corvette which was the victim of one of Britain's worst peacetime naval disasters when she sank in a snowstorm off the Isle of Wight on 24 March 1878. Out of a crew of over 300, only two survived.

== Origins of Eurydice ==
Designed by Admiral the Hon. George Elliot, the second Eurydice was a very fast 26-gun frigate designed with a very shallow draught to operate in shallow waters. She originally saw service on the North American and West Indies station between 1843 and 1846 under the command of her first captain, George Augustus Elliot (the eldest son of her designer). In July 1845, she was driven ashore near the Moro, Havana, Cuba. Her guns were taken off to lighten her before she was refloated. Under Captain Talavera Vernon Anson, her second commission between 1846 and 1850 was spent on the South African ("Cape of Good Hope") station. Her third commission, under Captain Erasmus Ommanney (between 1854 and 1855) and then Captain John Walter Tarleton (1855 to 1857) saw her first sent briefly to the White Sea during the Crimean War and then to the North American and West Indies station again. The Eurydice saw no further seagoing service in the next twenty years; she was converted into a stationary training ship in 1861. In 1877, she was refitted at Portsmouth and by John White at Cowes for seagoing service as a training ship.

== Loss of Eurydice ==
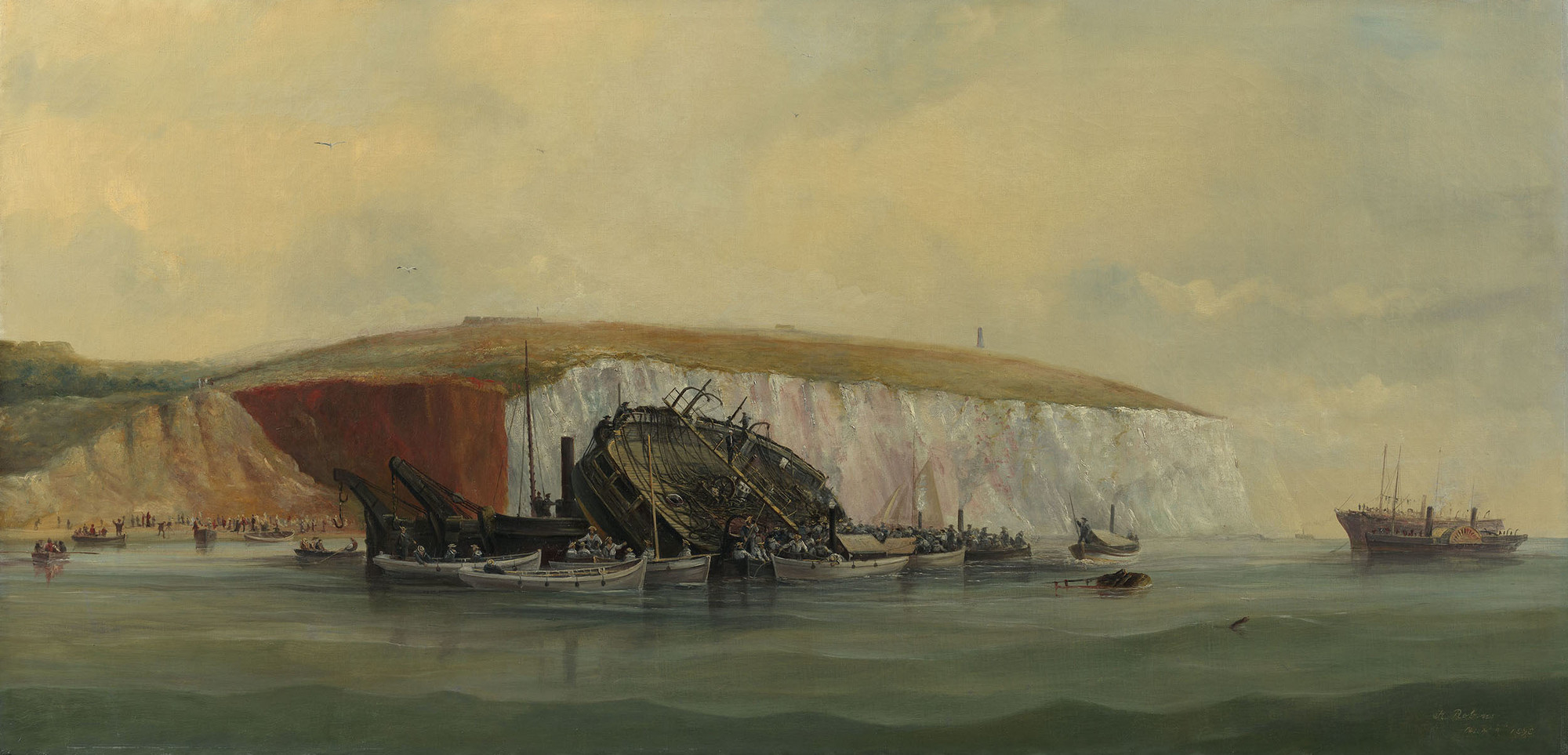
The Wreck of the Eurydice

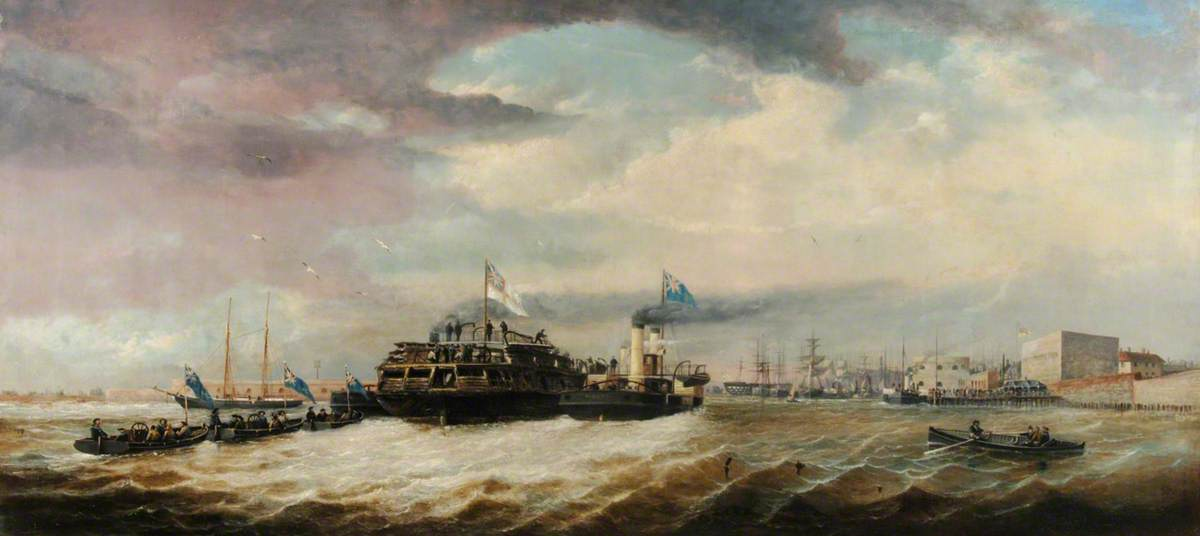
Wreck of Eurydice being towed into Portsmouth Harbour, 1 September 1878

After being recommissioned under the command of Captain Marcus Augustus Stanley Hare, Eurydice sailed from Portsmouth on a three-month tour of the North America and West Indies Station, which had its headquarters at Bermuda, on 13 November 1877. On 6 March 1878, she began her return voyage from the Royal Naval Dockyard in Bermuda for Portsmouth. After a very fast passage across the Atlantic, on 24 March 1878, Eurydice was caught in a heavy snow storm off the Dunnose headland at the Isle of Wight, capsized and sank in Sandown Bay.

A weather report in The Midland Naturalist explained:

The violent but brief atmospheric disturbance which was the cause of this catastrophe appears to have advanced from the N.W., and reached the north of England about ten a.m. Taking a south-easterly course, snow began to fall at Leicester about 1:45, and was followed by a strong gusty wind, but in an hour all was over. [...] The situation of the Eurydice—but a short distance to the S.E. of high cliffs, behind which chalk downs rise to a height of 800 or 900 feet, will sufficiently explain the way in which the squall took the vessel by surprise. The squall advancing from the N. W., the vessel was screened from it until it burst down the steep slope of the land in full fury.

Only two of the ship's 319 crew and trainees survived; most of those who were not carried down with the ship died of exposure in the freezing waters. Captain Hare, a devout Christian, after giving the order to every man to save himself, clasped his hands in prayer and went down with his ship. One of the witnesses to the disaster was toddler Winston Churchill, who was living at Ventnor with his family at the time. The wreck was refloated later that same year but had been so badly damaged during her submersion that she was then subsequently broken up. Her ship's bell is preserved in St. Paul's Church, Gatten, Shanklin. There is a memorial in the churchyard at Christ Church, The Broadway, Sandown and another at Shanklin Cemetery in Lake where seven crew members are buried. The ship's anchor is set into a memorial at Clayhall Cemetery, Gosport. Two of her crew, David Bennett and Alfred Barnes, are buried in Rottingdean St Margaret's churchyard when bodies were washed ashore nearby. There are four in the grave, but only two of the men could be identified.

== Prelude to a second disaster ==
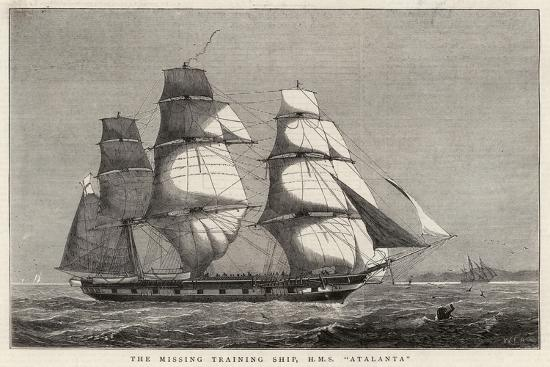
HMS Atalanta. The Graphic 1880

An inquiry found that the vessel had sunk through stress of weather and that her officers and crew were blameless for her loss. There was some adverse comment on the suitability of Eurydice as a training ship because of her extreme design, which was known to lack stability. However, she was immediately replaced by another 26-gun frigate of identical tonnage but slightly less radical hull-lines, HMS Juno. Juno was renamed HMS Atalanta and made two successful voyages between England and the West Indies before also disappearing at sea on her crossing the North Atlantic from Bermuda in 1880 with the loss of 281 lives; the ship is believed to have been lost in a storm. Later British seagoing training ships were smaller purpose-built brigs.

=== Figurehead ===
The figurehead of Eurydice was carved at Portsmouth dockyard by the resident master carver, J. E. Hellyer of the Hellyer & Sons family business

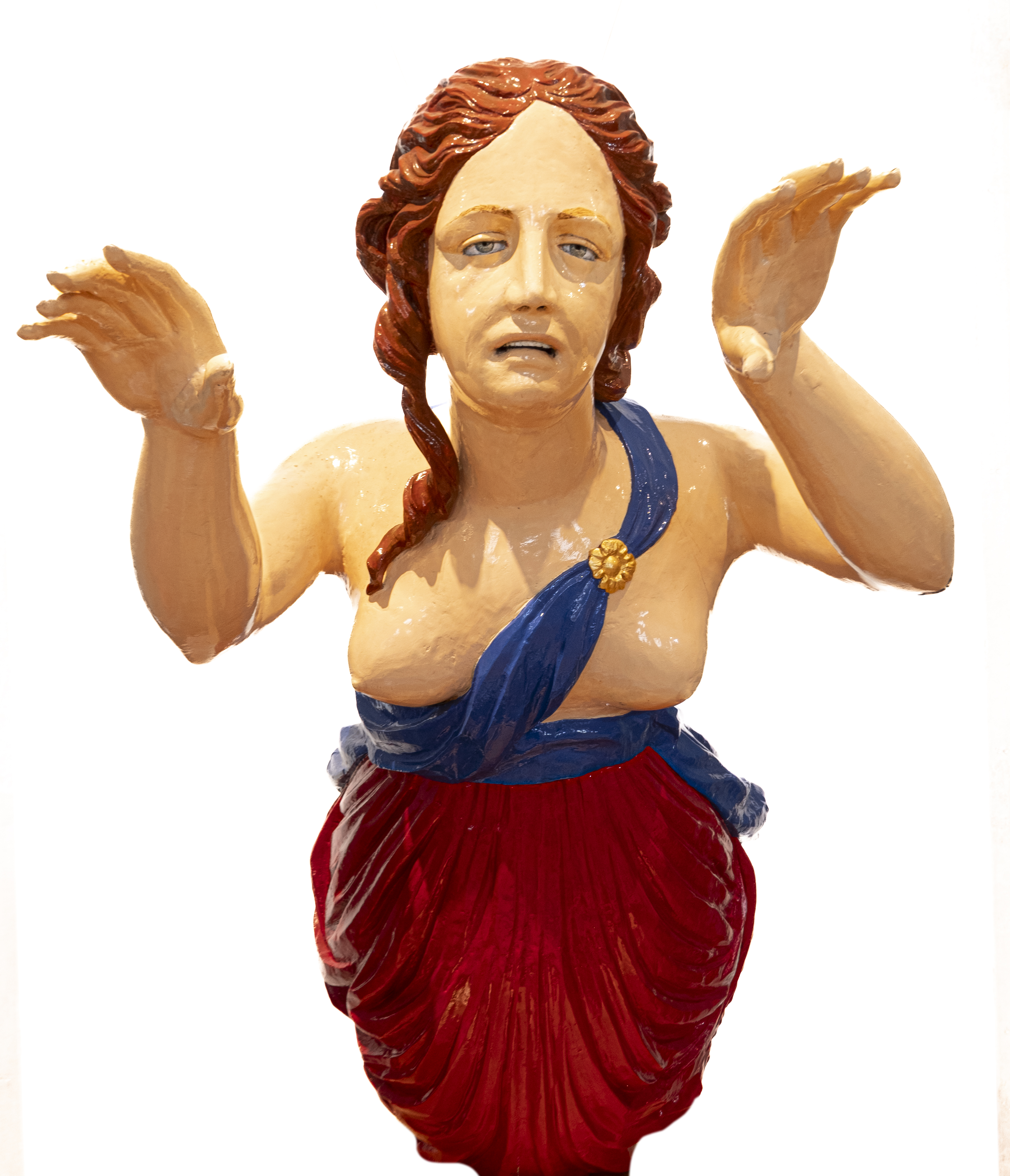
Figurehead of HMS Eurydice from the collection of the National Museum of the Royal Navy, 2025.

The figurehead is on display in the Figureheads Gallery at the National Museum of the Royal Navy, Portsmouth.

== In literature ==
The Loss of the Eurydice is a major poem by Gerard Manley Hopkins.

== Ghost ship ==
The phantom Eurydice has been sighted frequently by sailors over the years since her sinking, and she is said to haunt Dunnose, a cape on the Isle of Wight that lies west of Shanklin, close to the village of Luccombe at the southwesterly end of Sandown Bay. Most notably, on 17 October 1998, Prince Edward of the United Kingdom reportedly saw the three-masted ship off the Isle of Wight while filming for the television series Crown and Country, and the film crew claimed to have captured its image on film. There is also a story from Commander F. Lipscomb of a Royal Navy submarine which took evasive action to avoid the ship, only for it to disappear.

== Sources ==
- David Lyon, The Sailing Navy List, All the Ships of the Royal Navy Built, Purchased and Captured 1688–1860
- The Times, various dates 1878.
