= Dunnose, Isle of Wight =

Headland on the Isle of Wight, England

Coordinates: 50.604965°N 1.191094°W

Dunnose
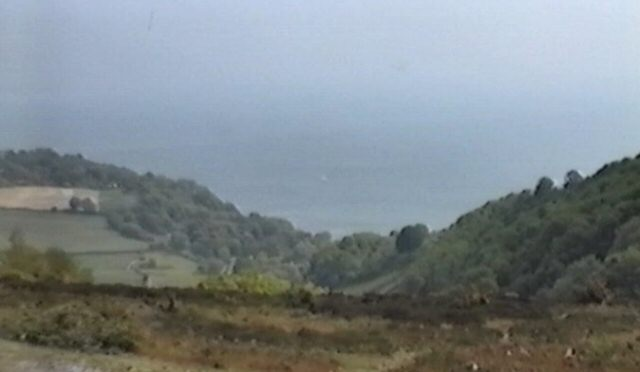
- Luccombe Down - The view over Dunnose

- Location within the Isle of Wight
- Unitary authority: Isle of Wight
- Ceremonial county: Isle of Wight
- Region: South East
- Country: England
- Sovereign state: United Kingdom
- UK Parliament: Isle of Wight East

Dunnose is a cape on the Isle of Wight in the English Channel. The headland is visible from well out to sea, and is used in navigation. It has twice been used as the base point for a triangulation of Great Britain. The line of accurately surveyed points running north from Dunnose to Clifton in Yorkshire provide the basis for triangulation to determine the positions of all other locations in Britain.

== History ==
German U-boat SM UB-81 sank off the coast of Dunnose in December 1917.

== Location ==
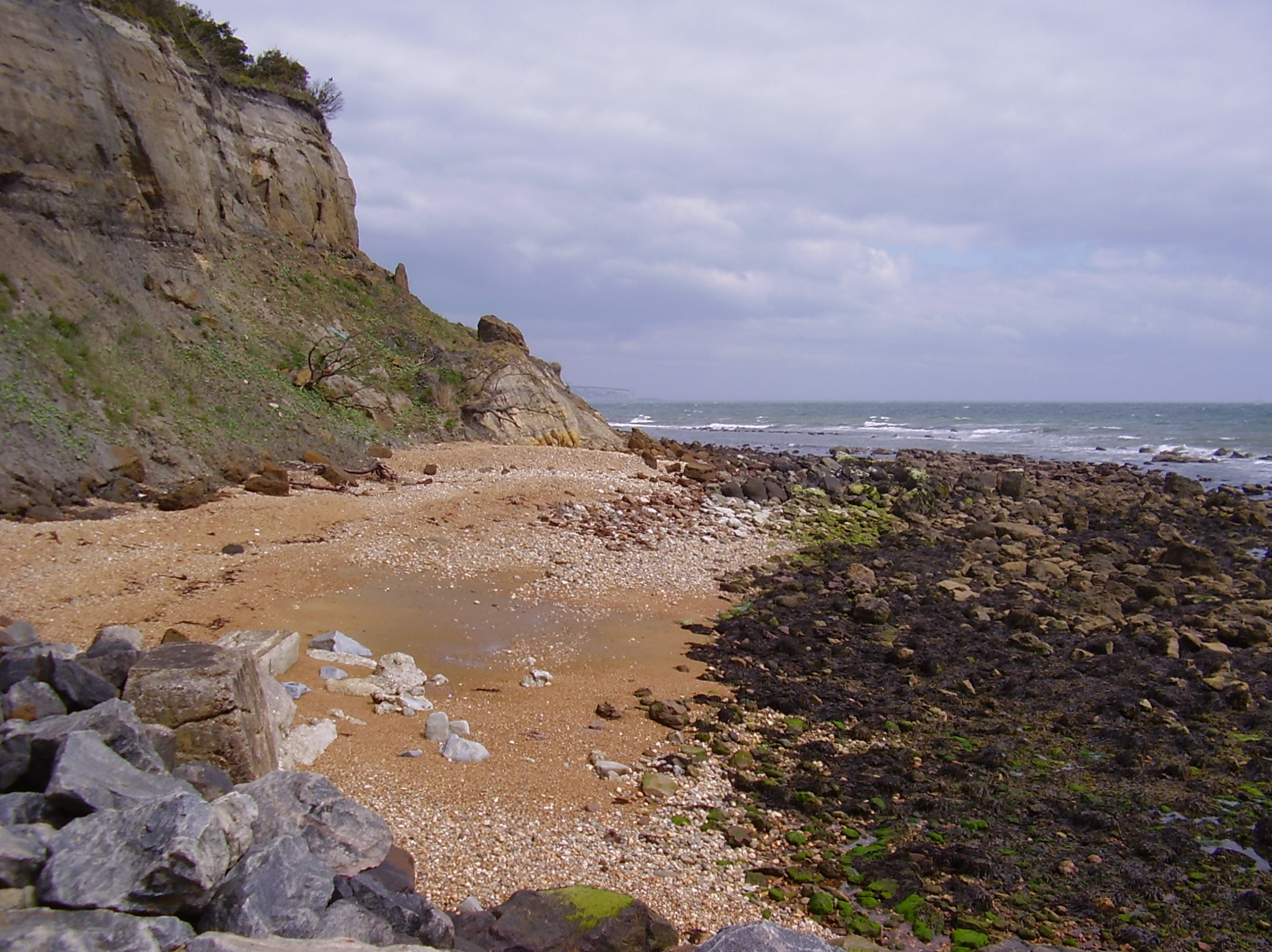
The beach at Dunnose

Dunnose Point lies to the east of Ventnor, and can be reached via the A3055. It is said to be haunted by HMS Eurydice, which sank off the point on 24 March 1878 with the loss of 300 people. The bay between Dunnose and St. Catherine's Point to the southeast has a rocky bottom and can be hazardous, since the charts may not show all the submerged rocks.

== Survey point ==
Around 1800 Dunnose was taken as a base point for a triangulation of Great Britain, in which Captain William Mudge measured a section of the meridional arc running up into Yorkshire. The triangulation was conducted in 1801 and 1802. The positions of twenty three points between Dunnose (Note: The survey point was marked by an iron gun sunk into the ground on the summit of Shanklin Down, near the village of Shanklin. Dunnose is actually the next projecting point to the south of Shanklin Down.) and Beacon Hill, Clifton, near Doncaster, were determined, and the closest possible measurements were made of the distances between the points and the direction from one point to another. Doubts were cast on the accuracy of the measurements in 1812, when Joseph Rodriguez pointed out that, if they were accurate, the length of a degree of longitude did not vary with latitude as it should if the earth were flattened at the poles. The Retriangulation of Great Britain that began in 1935 again took Dunnose as a base point. Dunnose also was the origin (meridian) of the 6 inch and 1:2500 Ordnance Survey maps for the central group of English counties: they were Derbyshire, Nottinghamshire, Lincolnshire, Staffordshire, Warwickshire, Worcestershire, Leicestershire, Rutlandshire, Northamptonshire, Gloucestershire, Oxfordshire, Buckinghamshire, Wiltshire, Berkshire, Hampshire and the Isle of Wight.

== Notes and references ==
Notes

Citations

Sources

- Bruce, Peter (1987). Wight Hazards. Boldre Marine. ISBN 978-1-871680-51-5.
- "Dunnose Point". Mysterious Britain & Ireland. 30 July 2008.
- Kater, Captain Henry (1819). "Capt. Kater's experiments for determining the variation in the length of the pendulum vibrating seconds.". Philosophical Transactions of the Royal Society of London. Royal Society of London.
- Kater, Captain H. (1820). "Kater on Pendulums". The Edinburgh Review, Or Critical Journal. Longmans, Green & Company.
- Mudge, William; Dalby, Isaac; Colby, Thomas (1799). An account of the operations carried out for accomplishing a trigonometrical survey of England and Wales ... Great Britain Ordnance Survey. Printed by W. Bulmer and co. for W. Faden.
- Murray, Hugh; Wallace, William; Jameson, Robert; Jackson Hooker, Sir William; Swainson, William; Bradford, Thomas Gamaliel (1837). The encyclopædia of geography: comprising a complete description of the earth, physical, statistical, civil, and political; exhibiting its relation to the heavenly bodies, its physical structure, the natural history of each country, and the industry, commerce, political institutions, and civil and social state of all nations. Carey, Lea and Blanchard. p. 141.
