= Sandown-Shanklin Urban District =

Former urban district in England

Coordinates: 50.639°N 1.169°W

Sandown-Shanklin
- Urban district
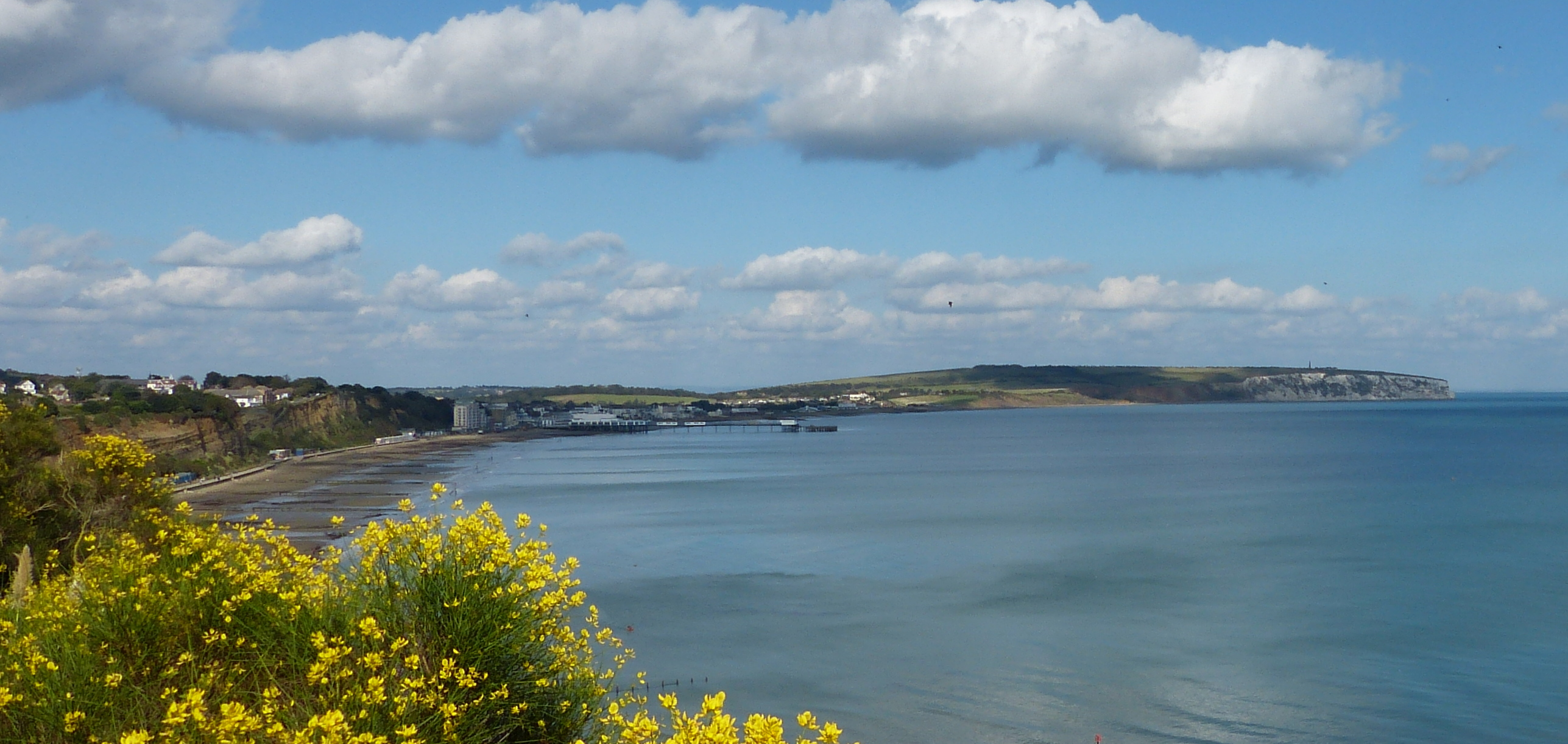
- Population
  - 1961: 14,386
- History
  - Created: 1 April 1933
  - Abolished: 31 March 1974
  - Succeeded by: South Wight
- Contained within
  - County: Isle of Wight

Sandown-Shanklin was an urban district on the Isle of Wight, England, from 1933. It was created by the merger of Shanklin and Sandown urban districts along with parts of the civil parishes of Brading, Bonchurch and Yaverland from the Isle of Wight Rural District. The district contained only the civil parish of Sandown-Shanklin. In 1961 it had a population of 14,386. It was abolished in 1974 under the Local Government Act 1972, to form part of the South Wight district. No successor parish was formed so it became unparished. On 1 April 1984 the parishes of Lake, Sandown and Shanklin were formed.
