= South Wight =

Former local government district in England

Coordinates: 50.6°N 1.2°W

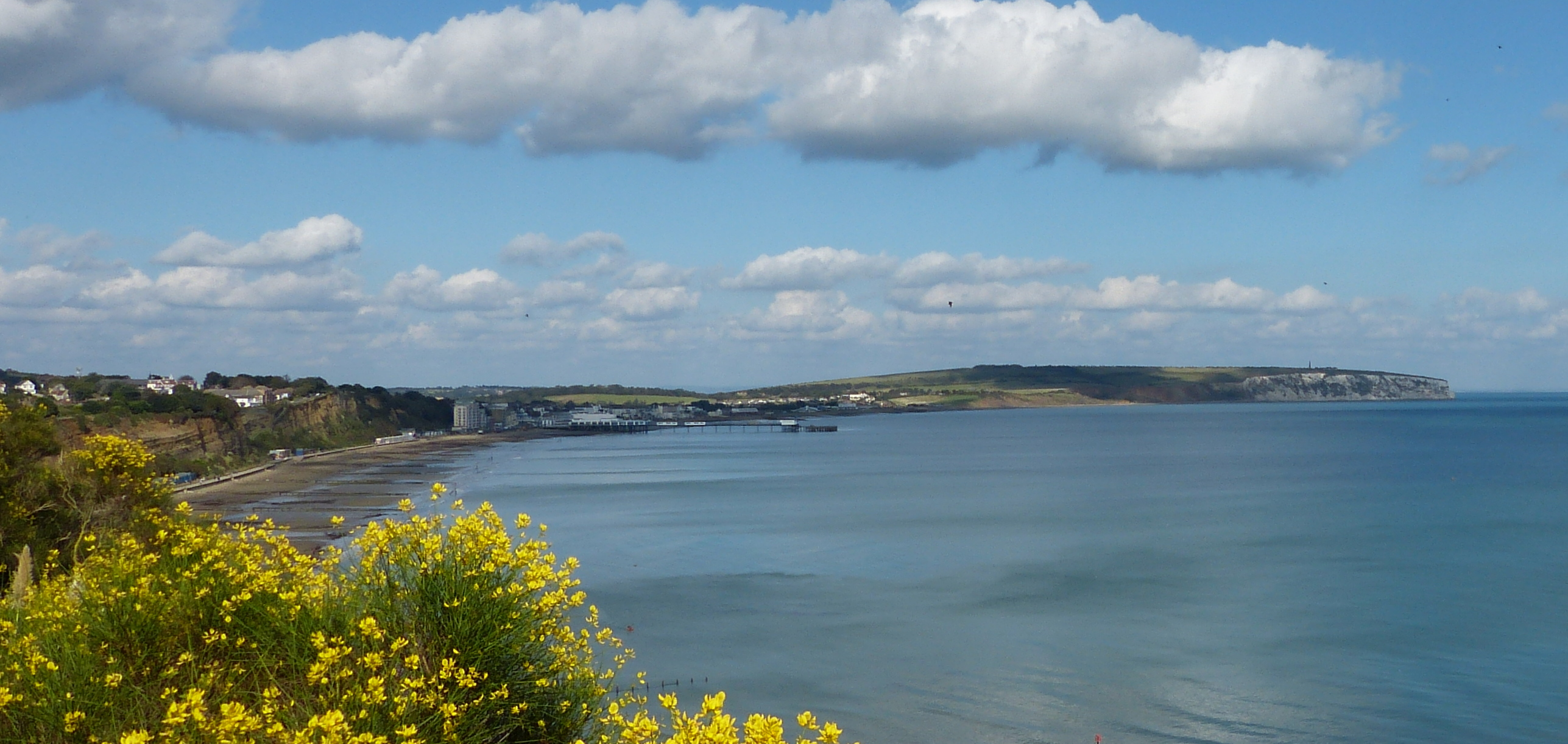

- Area
  - 1974: 65,185 acres (263.79 km^{2})
- Population
  - 1973: 44,890
  - 1992: 53,600
- History
  - Created: 1974
  - Abolished: 1995
  - Succeeded by: Isle of Wight
- Status: non-metropolitan district, borough
  - HQ: Newport

South Wight was a non-metropolitan district with the status of a borough on the Isle of Wight in England from 1974 to 1995.

The district was formed by the Local Government Act 1972, and was a merger of Sandown-Shanklin and Ventnor urban districts and Isle of Wight Rural District. It was one of two districts on the island formed in 1974 – the other was Medina. It was originally intended for there to be 1 single district for the Isle of Wight and for the Isle of Wight to be a district of Hampshire, it was later decided to have the Isle of Wight as a separate county and split it into 2 districts. At the time of creation in 1974 "Sandown-Shanklin" was the only unparished area, it was split into the parishes of Lake, Sandown and Shanklin in 1984.

Following a review by the Local Government Commission for England, the borough was abolished on 1 April 1995, when a single Isle of Wight Council replaced the island's county council and two district councils.

== See also ==
- South Wight Borough Council elections
