= Christ Church, Sandown =

Coordinates: 50°39′08″N 01°09′42″W

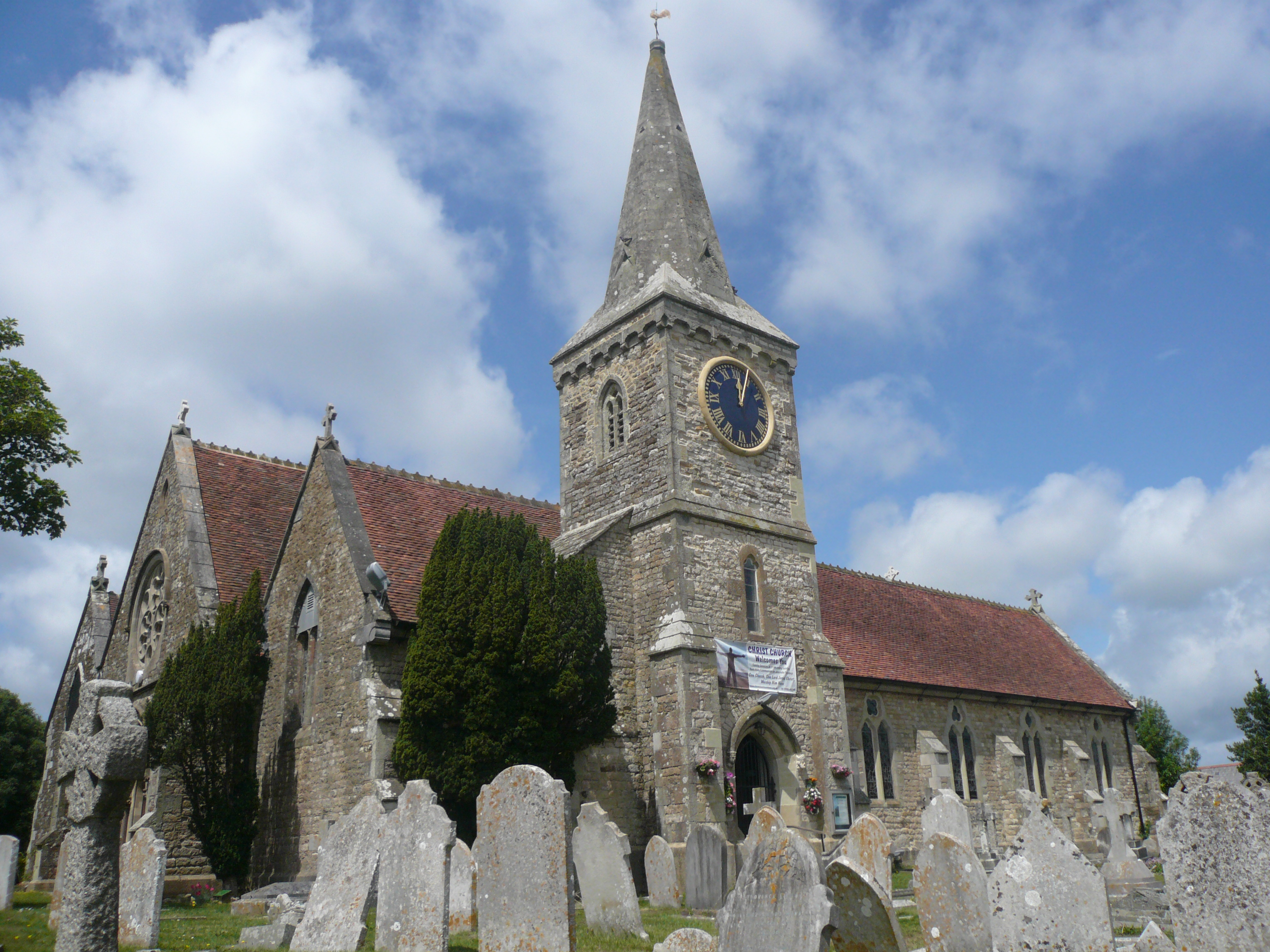
- Christ Church, Sandown
- Denomination: Church of England
- Churchmanship: Evangelical
- Website: http://www.christchurchsandown.org.uk/

History
- Dedication: Christ Church

Administration
- Province: Canterbury
- Diocese: Portsmouth
- Parish: Sandown

Clergy
- Vicar: Interregnum

Christ Church, Sandown is a parish church in the Church of England located in Sandown, Isle of Wight. Rev. William Darwin Fox, naturalist-clergyman, second cousin of Charles Darwin, is buried in the graveyard, with most of his large family.

== History ==
The church was built in 1845 by the architect Woodman

It was the first Church of England building in Sandown and so is considered the parish church of the town.

The ‘Princess Royal Chapel’ is named after Princess Victoria, eldest daughter of Queen Victoria, who gave a window in it.

The graveyard contains a memorial to the wreck of HMS Eurydice which featured in a Gerard Manley Hopkins poem of the same name. It also contains the war graves of 19 Commonwealth service personnel of World War I and two from World War II, besides one of a French Navy sailor from the former war.

== Parish status ==
The church is in a joint parish with the Church of St. John the Evangelist, Sandown.
