= Sandown Pier =

Pier in Sandown, Isle of Wight, England

- Sandown Pier in 2026
- Carries: Pedestrians
- Spans: Sandown
- Coordinates: 50°39′09.7″N 1°9′20″W
- Official name: Sandown Pier

Characteristics
- Total length: 870 feet (270 m)

History
- Opening date: 29 May 1878; 148 years ago

Sandown Pier is a pleasure pier in Sandown, Isle of Wight, England.

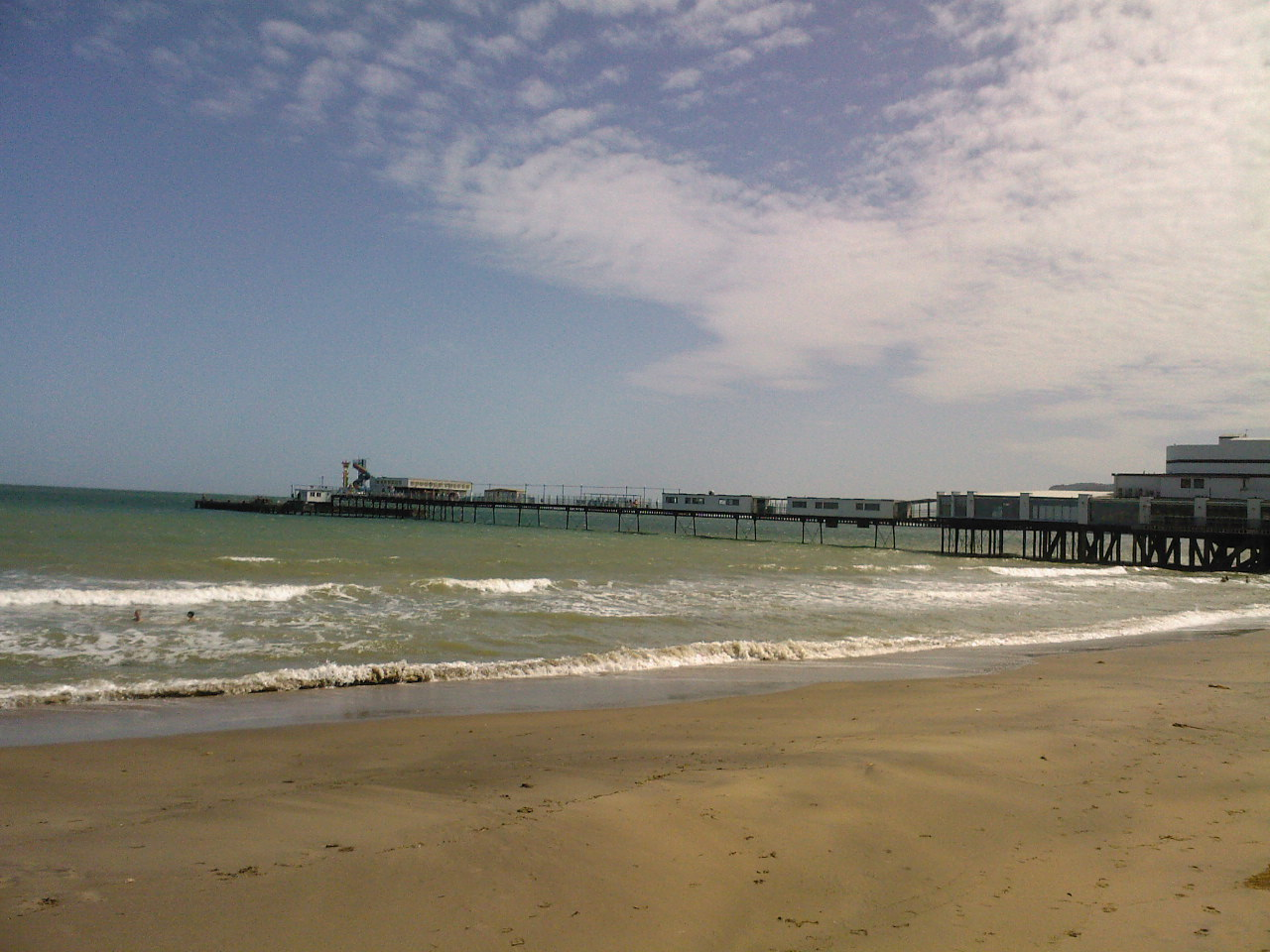
The pier as viewed from the beach

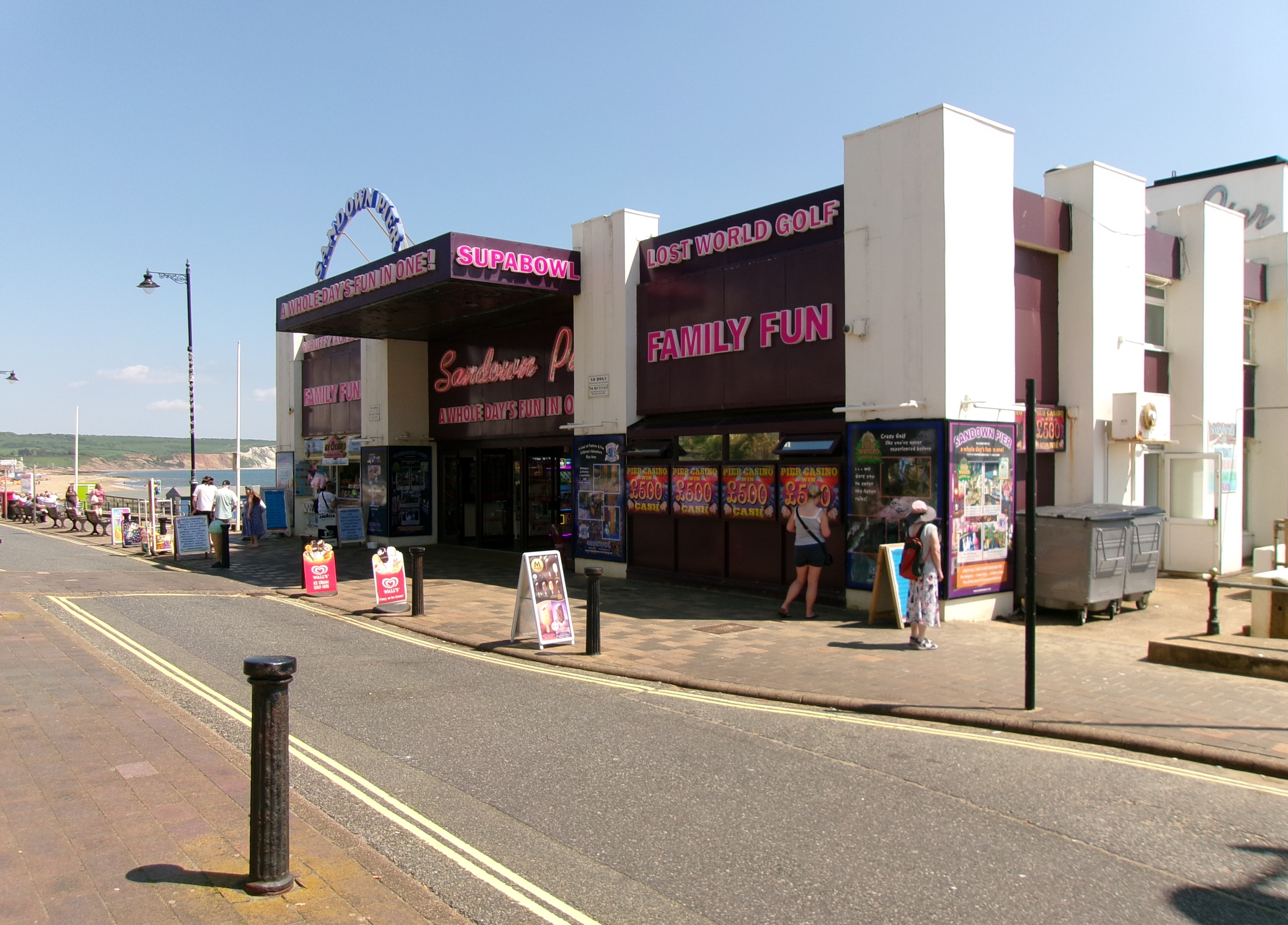
Pier entrance in 2024

== History ==
Plans for the pier were drawn up in the 1860s and the Sandown Pier Order 1864 was confirmed in Parliament in the Pier and Harbour Orders Confirmation Act 1864 (27 & 28 Vict. c. 93). However, construction did not start until 1876. The first section of the pier measured 360 feet (110 m) and it was opened on 29 May 1878 by Lady Oglander widow of Sir Henry Oglander, 7th Baronet.

Work to extend the pier to its full intended length were started in 1894. The new works were badly damaged in a storm on 12 January 1895.

On 17 September 1895 the pier reopened following modifications which lengthened it by 545 feet (166 m) giving it a total length overall of 870 feet (270 m). The breadth of the deck was 24 feet (7.3 m) and the head of the pier had an area 107 feet (33 m) by 93 feet (28 m). A landing stage was provided to allow passengers to arrive and depart by steamer. A pavilion to accommodate 400 people was constructed on the head of the pier with an elliptical dome. These works of improvement cost around £10,800 (equivalent to £1,227,800 in 2025).

The pier was taken over the Sandown Urban District Council in 1918.

In 1934 the pavilion at the shore end of the pier was opened by John Jellicoe, 1st Earl Jellicoe. It had cost £26,000 (equivalent to £1,469,400 in 2025).

In August 1989 a fire broke out in the amusement arcade and spread into the theatre causing damage estimated at £2,000,000. However, restoration was undertaken and the pier was reopened for the 1990 summer season.

== Facilities ==
The pier has a range of indoor amenities at the landward end, and an outdoor funfair and landing stage at the seaward end. There are cafes, a children's play area, an amusement arcade, bowling and an indoor crazy golf course.
