= Sandown Fort =

- Sandown, Isle of Wight, England
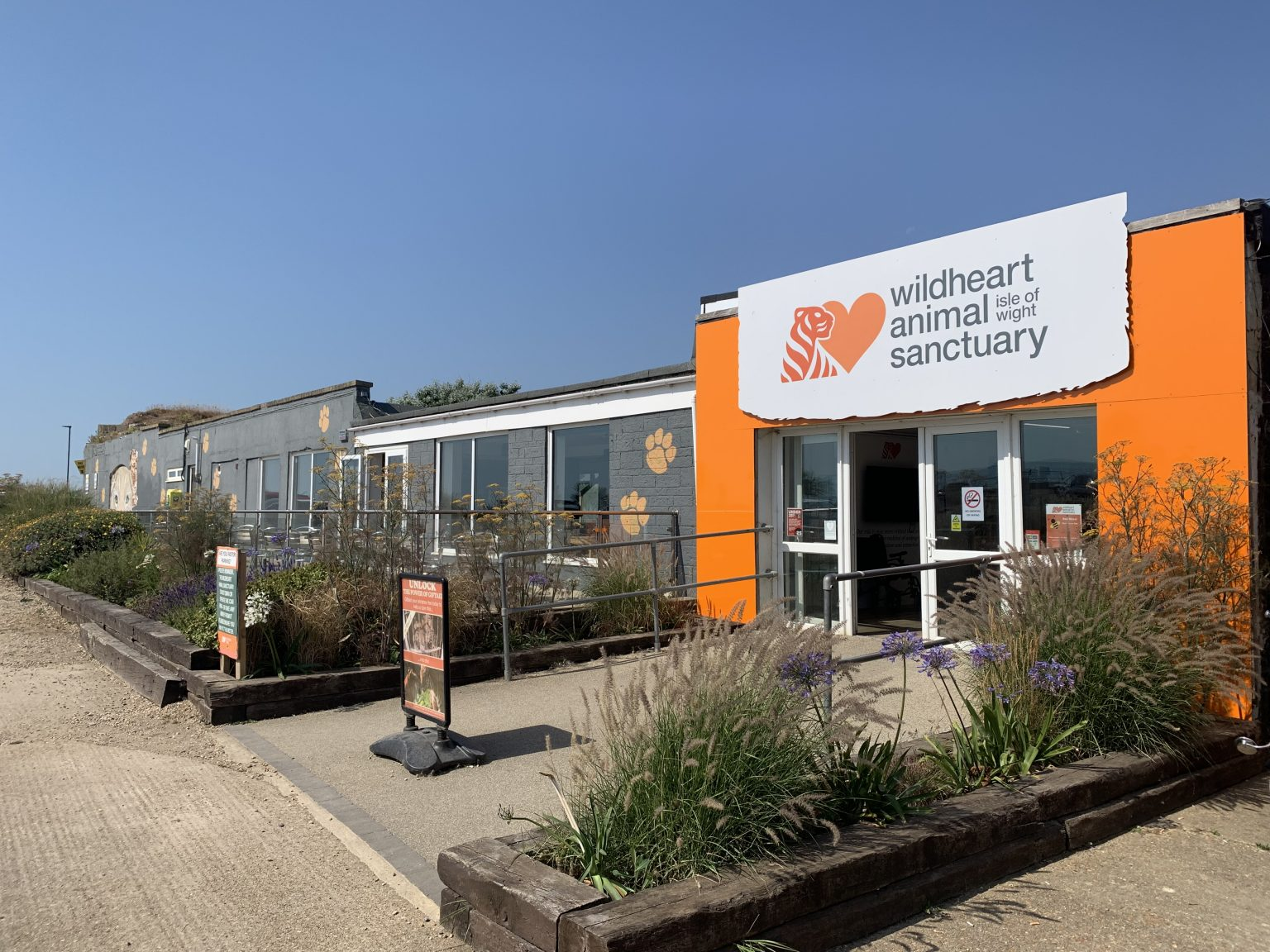
- The fort houses the Wildheart Animal Sanctuary, formerly known as the Isle of Wight Zoo.

Site information
- Owner: Wildheart Animal Sanctuary
- Open to the public: Yes

Location
- Coordinates: 50°39′38″N 1°08′21″W

Site history
- Built: September 1864
- In use: Zoo
- Materials: Granite

Sandown Fort (map reference SZ597839) is a fort built in Sandown on the Isle of Wight in the middle of Sandown Bay. It is one of the many Palmerston Forts built on the island to protect it in response to a perceived French invasion. It was a replacement of the earlier Sandown Diamond Fort as, in 1859, the Royal Commission felt it did not offer suitable protection. Construction of the fort began in April 1861 and was completed by September 1864 at a cost of £73,876. In later documents it is often referred to as Granite Fort. The fort originally had 18 9-inch R.M.L guns facing the sea behind iron shields, these guns were later upgraded and an extra 5 inches of armor was added.

The fort was sold in 1930 but during World War II the fort played a significant role in the D-Day landings as it housed sixteen pumps for the PLUTO (Pipe Line Under The Ocean) operation to keep the Allied forces supplied with fuel. Each of the 16 pumps supplied 36,000 imperial gallons (1,000 barrels; 160,000 litres) of fuel per day at a pressure of 1,500 pounds per square inch (100,000 millibars). In the 1950s the site was used to house the Isle of Wight Zoo, which was renamed as the Wildheart Animal Sanctuary in 2021.

== Publications ==
- Moore, David, 2010. The East Wight Defences, Solent Papers Number 10, David Moore, Gosport. ISBN 0954845331
