= Sandown =

Town on the Isle of Wight, England

Coordinates: 50.6551°N 1.1541°W

- Town, civil parish
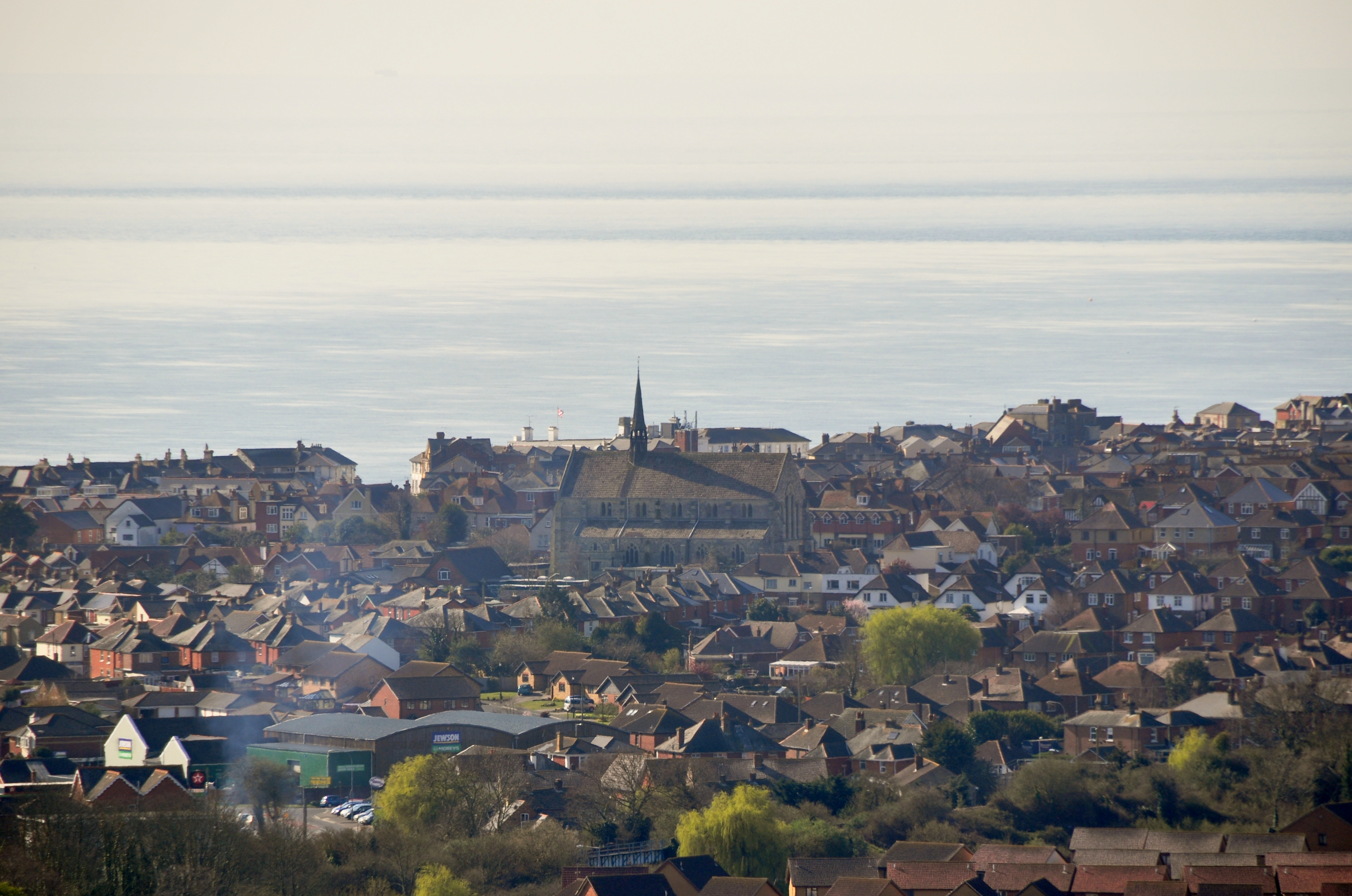
- The view of Sandown from Brading Down

- Location within the Isle of Wight
- Population: 7,129 (2021 census)
- OS grid reference: SZ600843
- Civil parish: Sandown
- Unitary authority: Isle of Wight
- Ceremonial county: Isle of Wight
- Region: South East
- Country: England
- Sovereign state: United Kingdom
- Post town: Sandown
- Postcode district: PO36
- Dialling code: 01983
- Police: Hampshire and Isle of Wight
- Fire: Hampshire and Isle of Wight
- Ambulance: Isle of Wight
- UK Parliament: Isle of Wight East

Sandown is a seaside resort town and civil parish on the south-east coast of the Isle of Wight, England. The neighbouring resort of Shanklin and the settlement of Lake are sited just to the south of the town. At the 2021 census, the parish had a population of 7,129, while the wider Sandown built-up area had a population of 11,655. Sandown is the northernmost town on Sandown Bay, with its easily accessible, sandy beaches running continuously from the cliffs below Battery Gardens in the south to Yaverland in the north.

== History ==
There is some evidence for a pre-Roman settlement in the area. During the Roman period, it was a site of salt production.

The name Sandown derives from the Old English sandhām meaning 'sandy village' or possibly from sandhamm meaning 'sandy hemmed-in land'.

During the medieval times, Sandown was known as Northsandham ('north Sandown'), with the village of Lake being known as Southsandham ('south Sandown').

Before the 19th century, Sandown was on the map chiefly for its military significance, with the Bay's beaches feared to offer easy landing spots for invaders from the Continent.

It is the site of the lost Sandown Castle. While undergoing construction in 1545, the fortification was attacked during the French invasion of the Isle of Wight when invaders fought their way over Culver Down from Whitecliff Bay before being repelled. The castle was built into the sea, prone to erosion and demolished fewer than a hundred years after it was built. In 1631, the castle was replaced by Sandham Fort, built further inland. In 1781, the fort's complement consisted of a master gunner and over twenty soldiers. Sandham Fort was demolished in the second half of the 19th century and is now the site of Sandham Gardens.

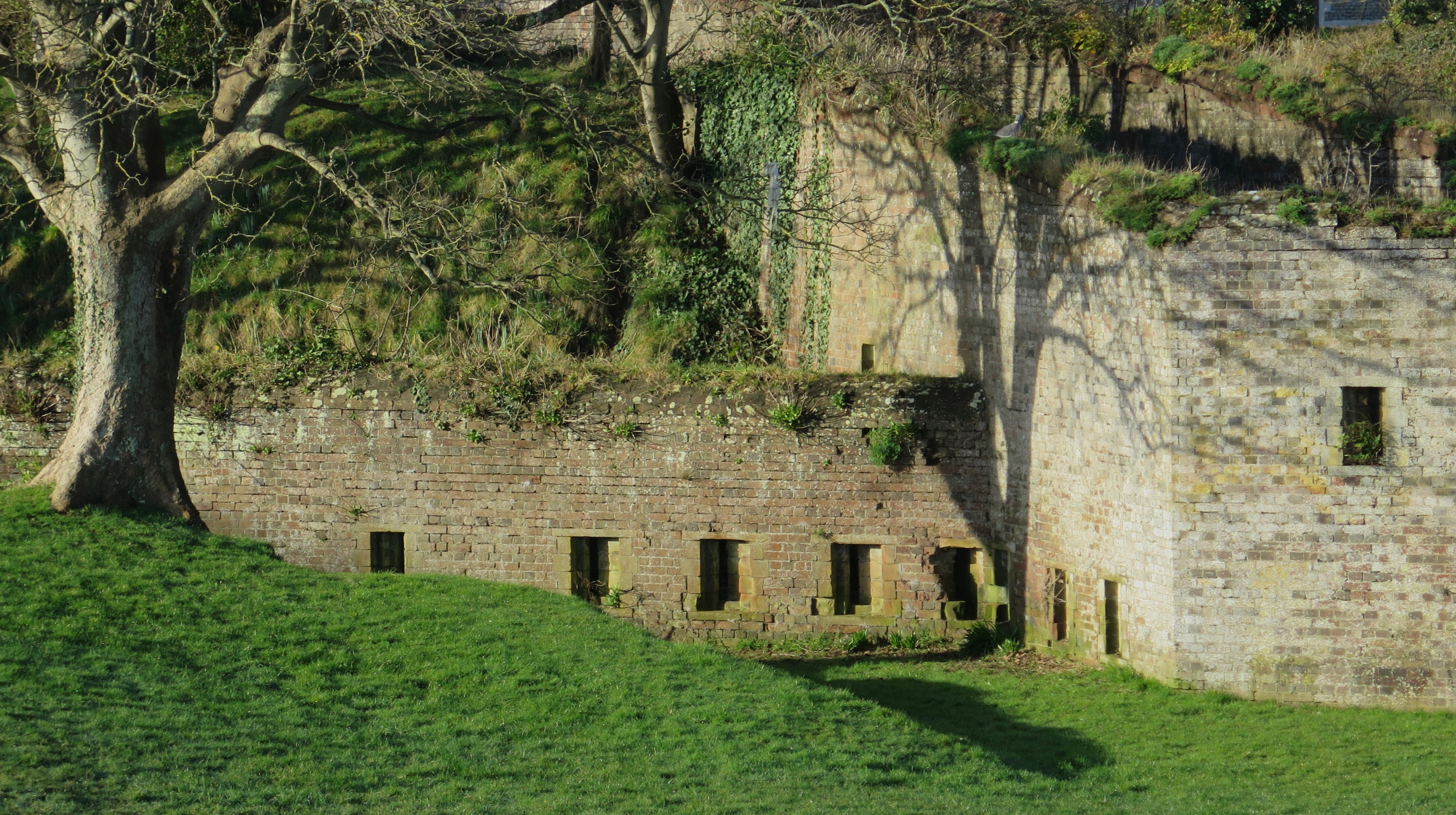
Sandown Barrack Battery, a Palmerston Fort built in the 1860s

In the 1860s, five Palmerston Forts were built along the coast of Sandown Bay, including Granite Fort at Yaverland, now the Wildheart Animal Sanctuary. On the town's western cliffs Sandown Barrack Battery survives as a scheduled monument and Bembridge Fort, where the National Trust offers tours, can be seen on the downs to the north-east.

One of the first non-military buildings was Sandham Cottage or 'Villakin', a holiday home leased by the radical politician and one-time Mayor of London John Wilkes in the final years of the 18th century. See 'Sandown's famous connections' below.

The arrival of the railway in 1864 saw Sandown grow as a Victorian resort, with the town's safe bathing becoming increasingly popular. In the summer of 1874, the Crown Prince Frederick and Princess Victoria of Germany, their children and entourage rented several properties in the town and took regular dips in the Bay. Sandown's pier was built in the same decade, opening in May 1878, and extended in length in 1895.

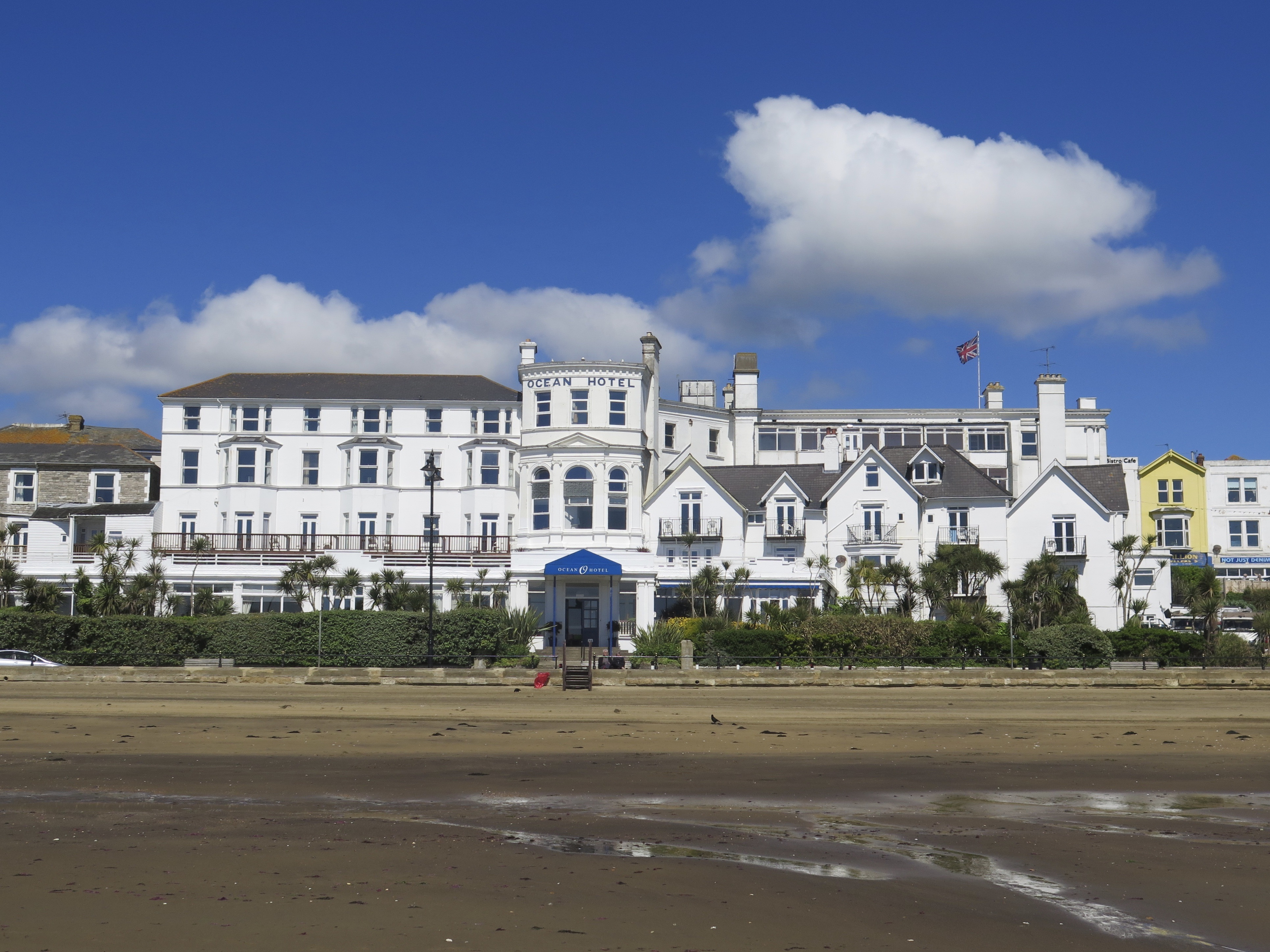
The former Ocean Hotel

The town laid further claim to becoming a fashionable English resort when the Ocean Hotel opened in 1899. The brainchild of West End theatrical impresario Henry Lowenfeld, the Ocean built around the town's previous hotel of choice, the King's Head. For the new hotel's inauguration, a large number of dignitaries were invited from London, arriving in Sandown from Portsmouth by special boat. Guests had the chance to explore Sandown in coaches and carriages, and the hotel servants were all dressed in uniforms 'like admirals and post-captains'.

In 1894 Sandown became an urban district, the district contained only the parish of Sandown. On 1 April 1933 the district and parish were abolished to form Sandown-Shanklin. In 1974 "Sandown-Shanklin" became an unparished area in South Wight district. On 1 April 1984 Sandown became a parish again. In 1995 it became part of the Isle of Wight unitary authority area.

=== Dorothy O'Grady ===
During 1939 and 1940, in World War II, Dorothy O'Grady was an enemy spy in Sandown. She moved from London to the Isle of Wight with her husband, a former sailor and fireman, around 20 years older than her, in the mid-1930s and lived in Lake for a time before moving to Osborne Villa on The Broadway the main road through Sandown. When the Luftwaffe began to bomb London, her husband returned as a fireman. While he was still in work, Dorothy, who remained in Sandown, was arrested in August 1939. There were suggestions that her husband did not know what she allegedly did, as she refused to see him during her arrest. She was often sighted taking her Golden Retriever for walks in areas with no public access, which aroused suspicions. She was summoned to the County Bench at Ryde. When she did not come, a warrant for her arrest was issued. She was found with a false name in the West Wight (Back of the Wight), arrested and taken to Yarmouth Police Station. She told officers "I was too scared to attend", and was again summoned to Ryde on 15 October of the same year. She was committed for trial at Hampshire Assizes. The 2 day trail was held at Winchester from 16 to 17 December before Mr Justice Macnaghten, when Mrs O'Grady, defended by Mr J Scott-Henderson, pleaded not guilty to all 9 charges, all around the subject of sabotaging the British forces. It took around 1 hour for the judge to reach his verdict: she was found guilty of all 9 counts and treachery. She was sentenced to be hanged. A few days after Christmas, national newspapers reported her application to appeal. On Monday 10 February 1941, it was held at the Central Criminal Court in London. Her husband said he was "shocked and appalled" with her charges. The appeal was successful. Instead of being hanged, she would spend 14 years in prison. She served her sentence fully at the HM Prison Holloway, returning to the Island and Osborne Villa in 1955. On the day of her return, she was interviewed by Ted Findon for the Daily Express.

Another spy, Rose Murphy, was arrested for sending morse code messages to German planes from Sandown.

=== 20th and 21st centuries ===
Sandown's destiny in the 20th century was to become a favourite bucket-and-spade destination for all classes. The Canoe Lake was opened in 1929 by the author Henry De Vere Stacpoole followed in 1932 by Brown's Golf Course. The Art Deco Grand Hotel, opened next door to Brown's in April 1938, is now closed with planning permission for demolition granted in 2014.

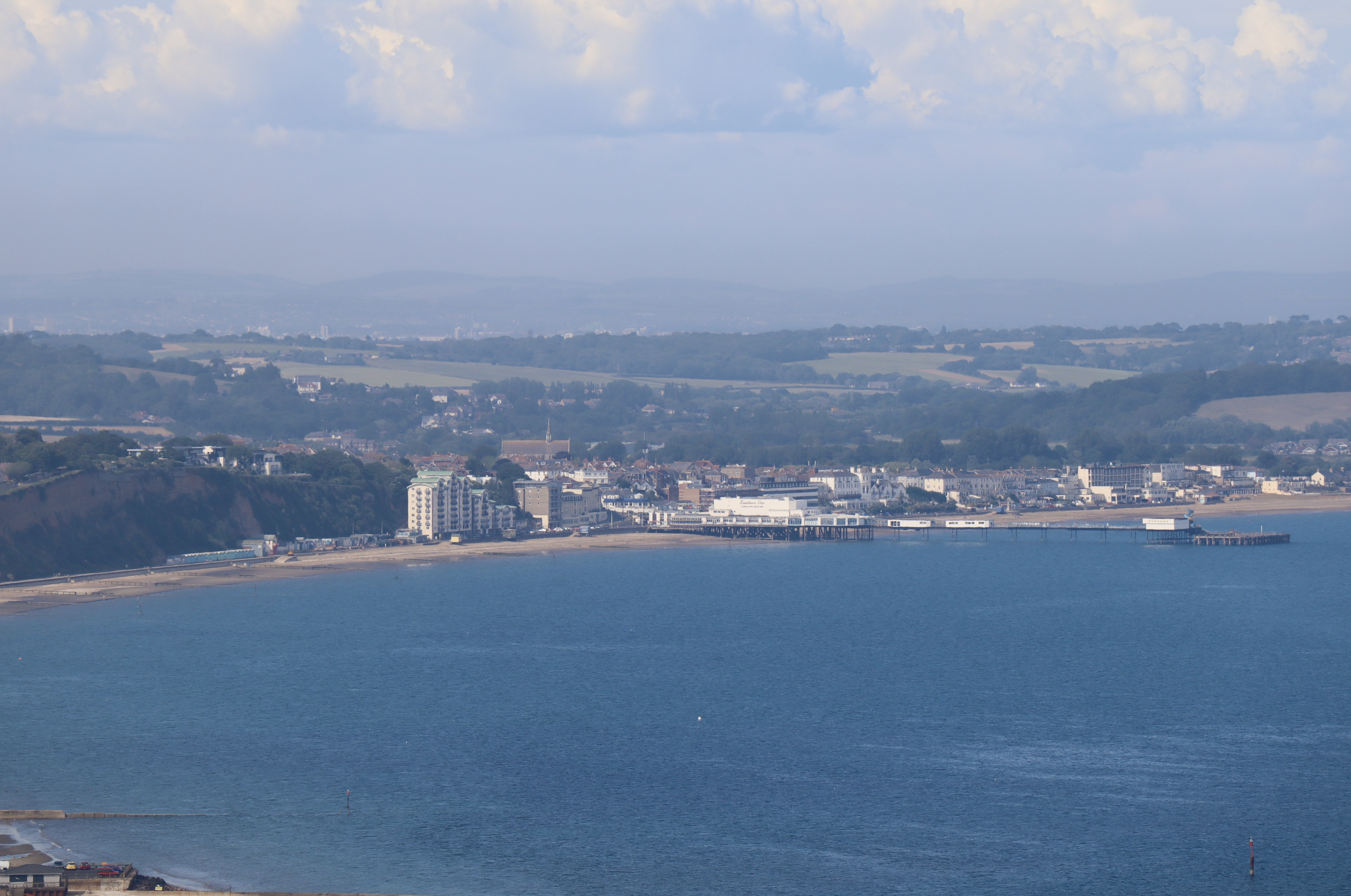
A view of Sandown and its pier from the south end of the Bay

Today, Sandown's esplanade has a mixture of former Victorian and Edwardian hotels with modern counterparts overlooking the beach and the Bay. A new Premier Inn opened in 2021.

The original Sandown Pier was opened in 1878 and extended to its present length in 1895. The Pier Pavilion Theatre closed in the 1990s and the pier's former landing stage is used for sea fishing today.

Further north is the Wildheart Animal Sanctuary, formerly Isle of Wight Zoo. Established as Sandown Zoo in the 1950s, it was acquired by the Corney family in the 1970s; today, it specialises in rescued tigers, other big cats and primates. Nearby is the purpose-built Dinosaur Isle palaeontology centre, which opened in 2001, and Sandham Gardens, which offers a dinosaur miniature golf course, attractions for children and young people, and bowls.

=== HMS Eurydice ===
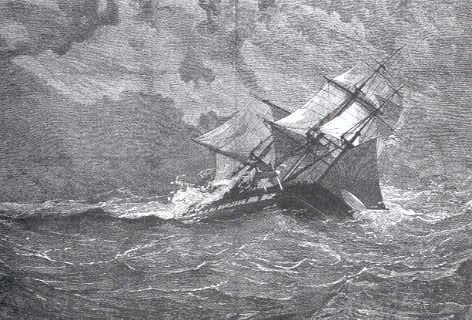
HMS Eurydice foundering in 1878

On 24 March 1878, the Royal Navy training ship HMS Eurydice capsized and sank in Sandown Bay with the loss of 317 lives, one of Britain's worst peacetime naval disasters. The tops of the vessel's sunken masts were still visible from Sandown two months later, on the day the town's pier was opened.

The ship was re-floated in August and beached at Yaverland to be pumped out, the subject of a painting by Henry Robins (1820–1892) for Queen Victoria who came over from Osborne House with other members of her family to see the wreck.

There is a memorial to crew of the Eurydice in the graveyard of Christ Church, Sandown.

== Geography ==
The town is surrounded by natural features that form part of the Isle of Wight Biosphere Reserve designated by UNESCO's Man and the Biosphere Programme in June 2019. The area features walks along the Isle of Wight Coastal Path.

The bay that gives Sandown its name is an example of a concordant coastline, with 5 miles (8 km) of tidal beaches from Luccombe to Culver replenished by longshore drift. Sandown Bay has one of the longest unbroken beaches in the British Isles.

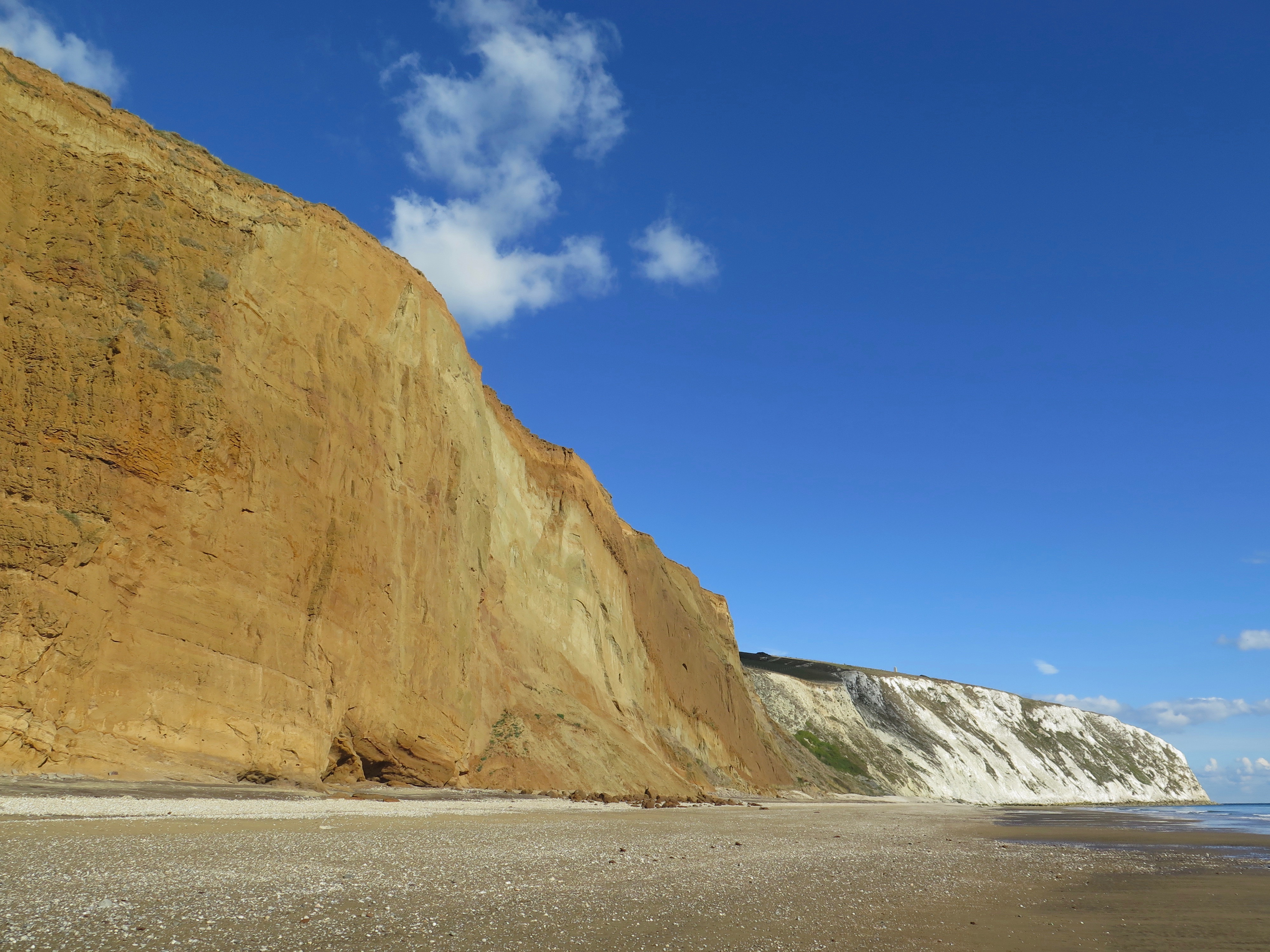
Red Cliff and Culver Cliff at the northern end of Sandown Bay

To the north-east is Culver Down, mostly owned and managed by the National Trust. It supports typical chalk downland wildlife, and seabirds and birds of prey which nest on the cliffs.

Nearby is the flood plain of the Eastern Yar, one of the few freshwater wetlands on the Isle of Wight, where Alverstone Mead local nature reserve is popular for birdwatching. Sandown Meadows nature reserve, acquired by the Hampshire and Isle of Wight Wildlife Trust in 2012, is a place to spot kingfishers and water voles. Further inland, Borthwood Copse provides woodland walks, with many bluebells in the spring.

The area's marine sub-littoral zone, including the reefs and seabed, is a Special Area of Conservation. At extreme low tide, a petrified forest may be revealed in the northern part of the bay, and fragments of petrified wood are often washed up.

== Demographics ==
At the 2021 census, the civil parish had a population of 7,129 people in 3,259 households. The Office for National Statistics also define a Sandown built-up area, including the urbanised part of the neighbouring parish of Lake, which had a population of 11,655 in 2021. A separate built-area for Shanklin, with which Sandown and Lake form a conurbation, had a population of 9,120.

Census population of Sandown parish
| Census | Population | Female | Male | Households | Source |
|---|---|---|---|---|---|
| 2001 | 6,549 | 3,431 | 3,118 | 2,708 | |
| 2011 | 7,185 | 3,708 | 3,477 | 3,000 | |
| 2021 | 7,129 | 3,720 | 3,409 | 3,259 | |

== Landmarks ==
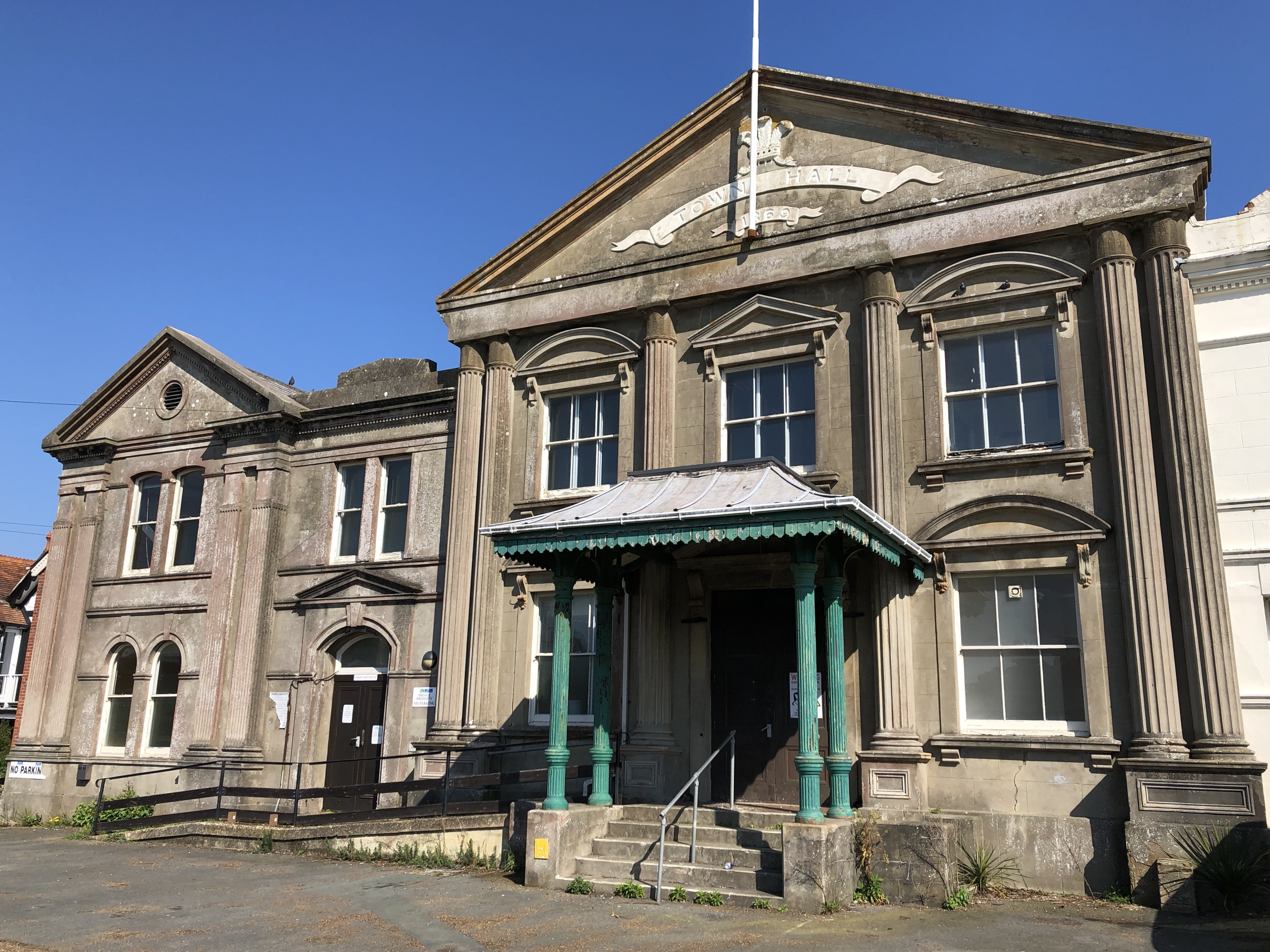
Sandown Town Hall

Commissioned by the local board of health in 1869, the grade II listed Sandown Town Hall is in Grafton Street. The interior included a multi-coloured ceiling decorated by Henry Tooth in 1873, hidden for many decades beneath layers of 20th century paint until uncovered in 2022. In 2023, the building was restored to house a 'youth hub'.

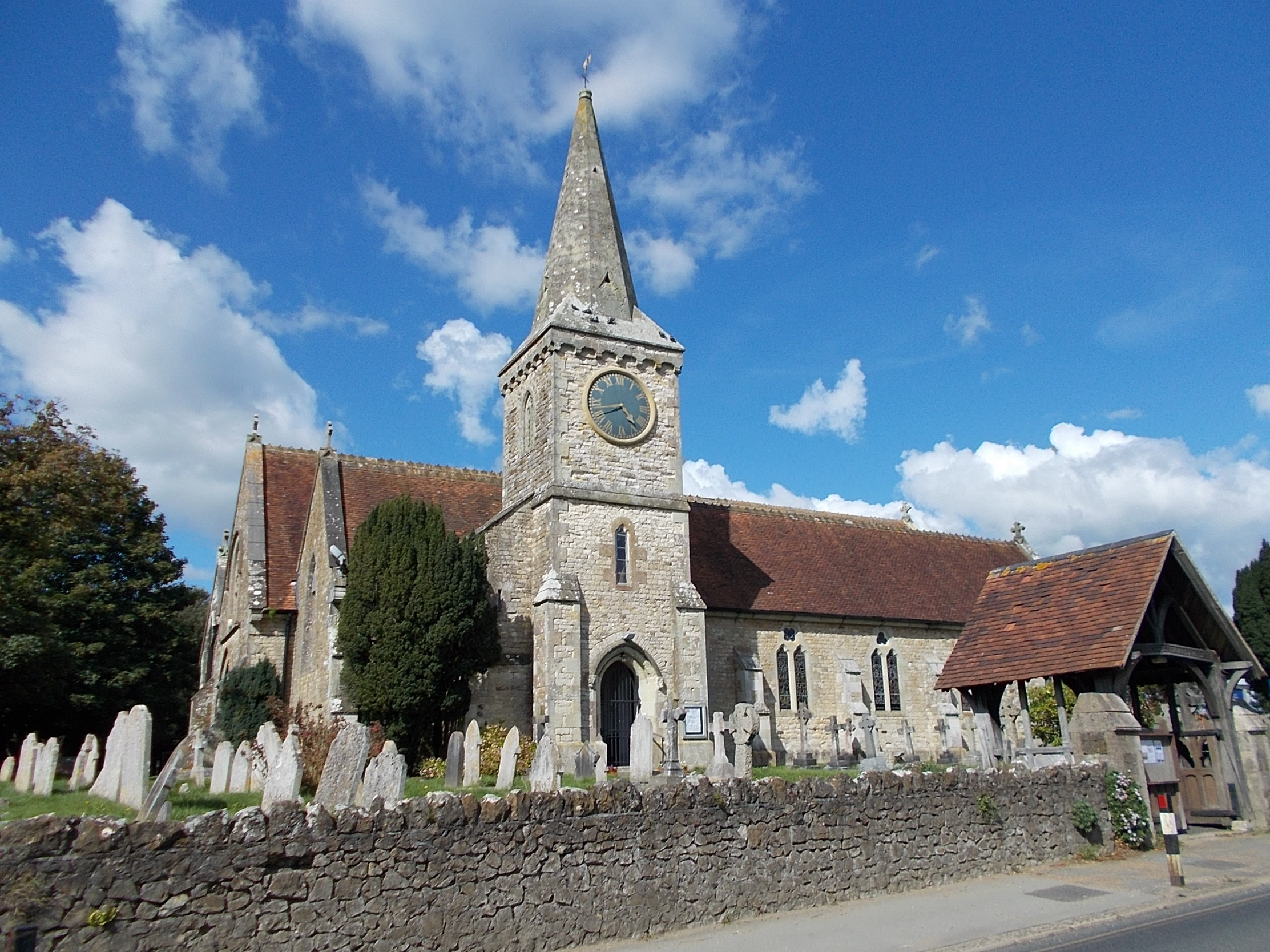
Christ Church, Sandown's parish church consecrated in 1847

The Church of St John the Evangelist is a large, Victorian Church of England parish church in the Early English style, with a grade II listing.

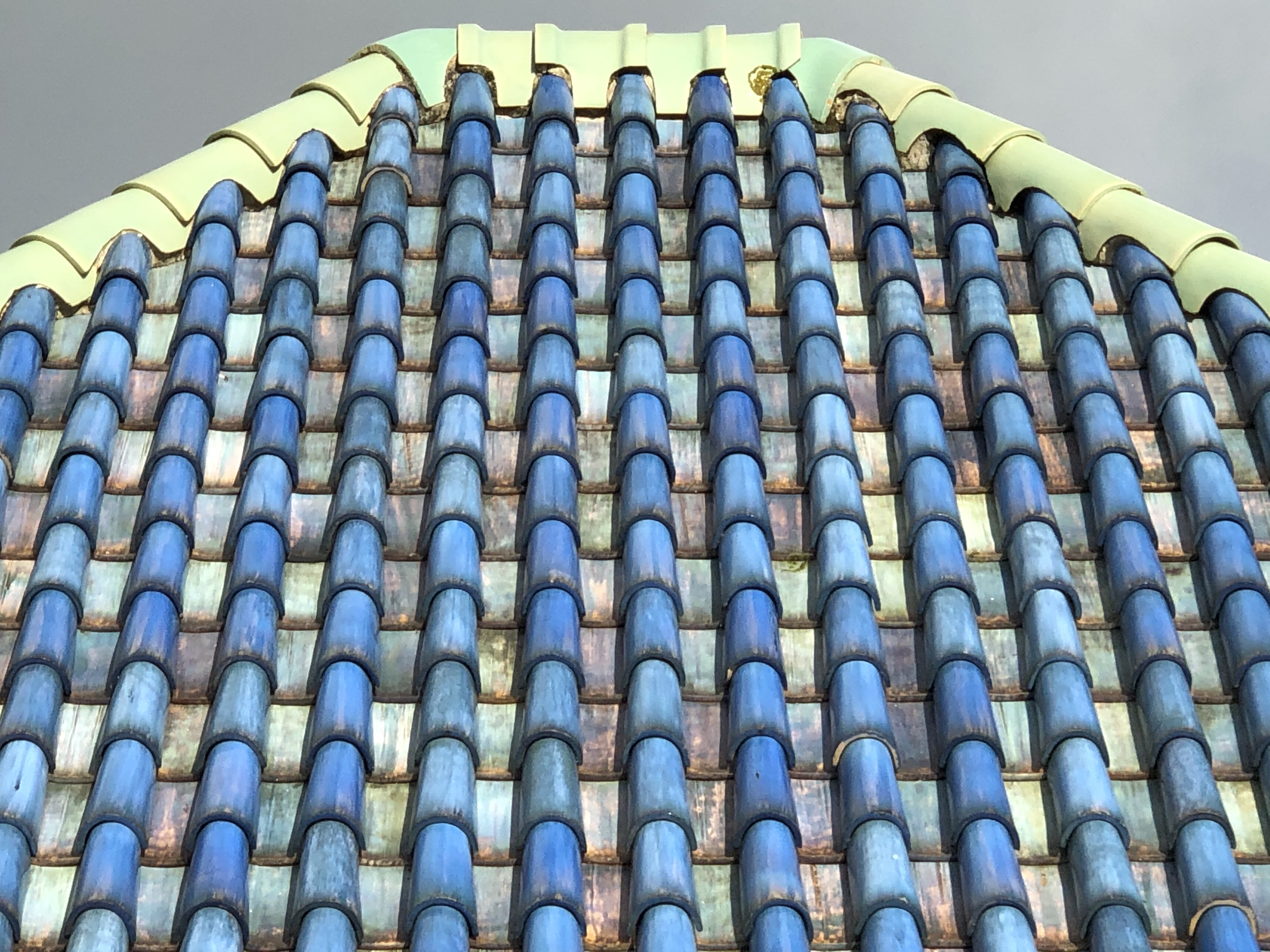
The distinctive 1930s roof tiles at Brown's Golf Course on Sandown seafront

Designed by one of the UK's leading players of the time, Henry Cotton, the Brown's pitch and putt golf courses were the idea of south London pie and sausage maker Alex Kennedy. Opened on Sandown's eastern sea front in March 1932, the original clubhouse had the motto golf for everybody emblazoned on its roof. Brown's and its ice cream factory were adapted in the 1940s to disguise pumping apparatus for Pipeline Under the Ocean (PLUTO) intended to deliver oil to the D-Day beaches. The 1930s clubhouse and ornamental fountains survive, along with ancillary buildings now used by the environmental business Artecology. Today, Brown's is in the ownership of the Isle of Wight Council with its three golf courses and café leased to a private operator.

== Culture and community ==
Sandown had a twinning (jumelée in French) arrangement with the town of Tonnay-Charente in the western French département of Charente-Maritime, although the relationship was reported to be 'in tatters' in 2002. Sandown has also been twinned with the United States city of St. Pete Beach, Florida.

In 2026, Sandown applied to become the first UK Town of Culture, and was chosen from nearly 400 entries as one of 15 finalists in the competition, with the winner and two runners-up to be announced in 2027. Sandown's bid calls on the local community to become "tide turners", using the town's rundown reputation to kickstart regeneration after years of decline.

=== Carnival events ===
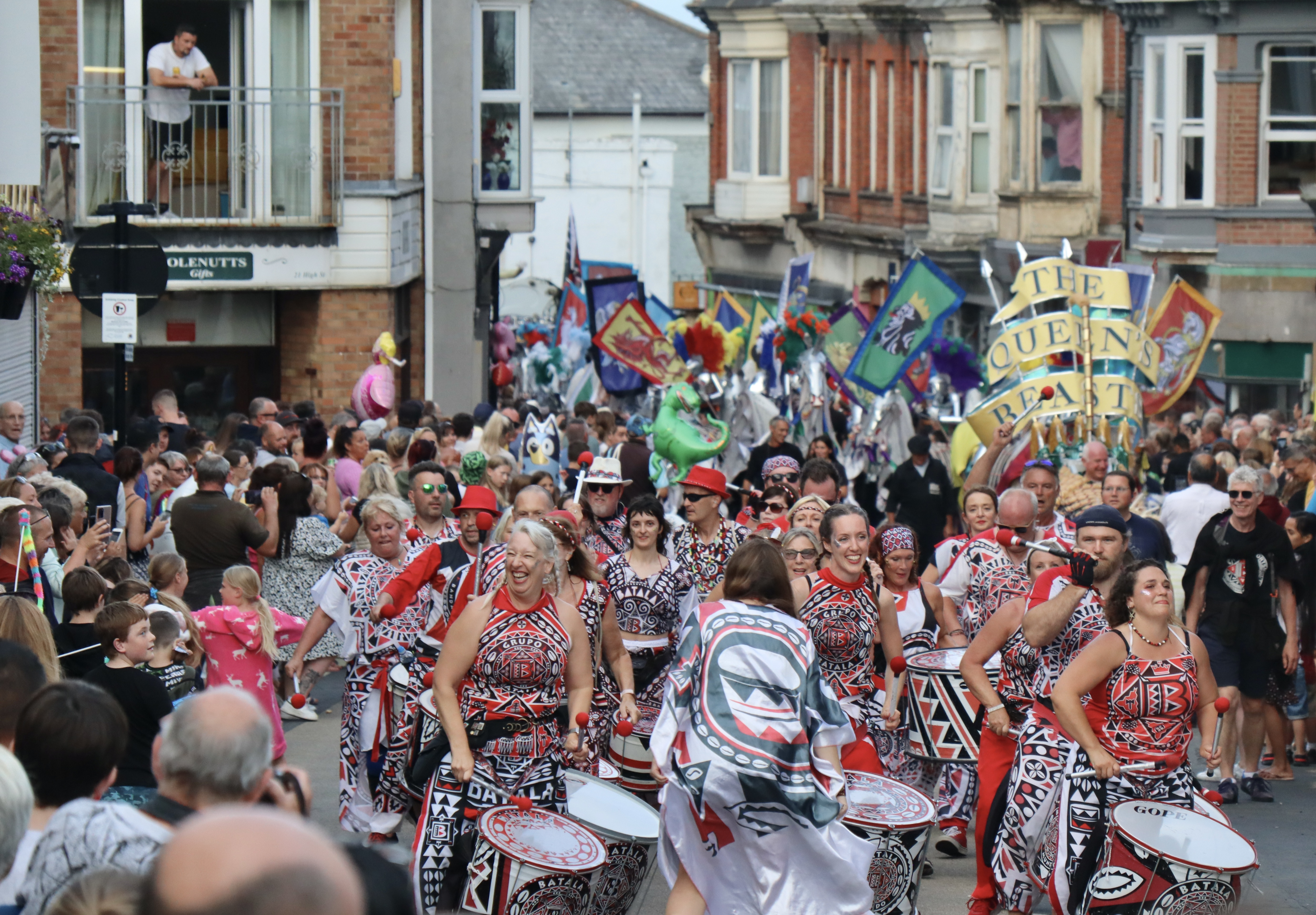
Sandown Main Carnival in July 2022

The town's summer carnival has existed since 1889 and is one of the oldest in the UK. Today, Sandown Carnival Association – a non-profit community group run by volunteers – puts on a series of popular events including the annual children's, main and illuminated carnivals, as well as fireworks displays.

In 2022, the association took on the organisation of Sandown Bay Regatta, another historic town event with roots in Victorian times and first held in 1857.

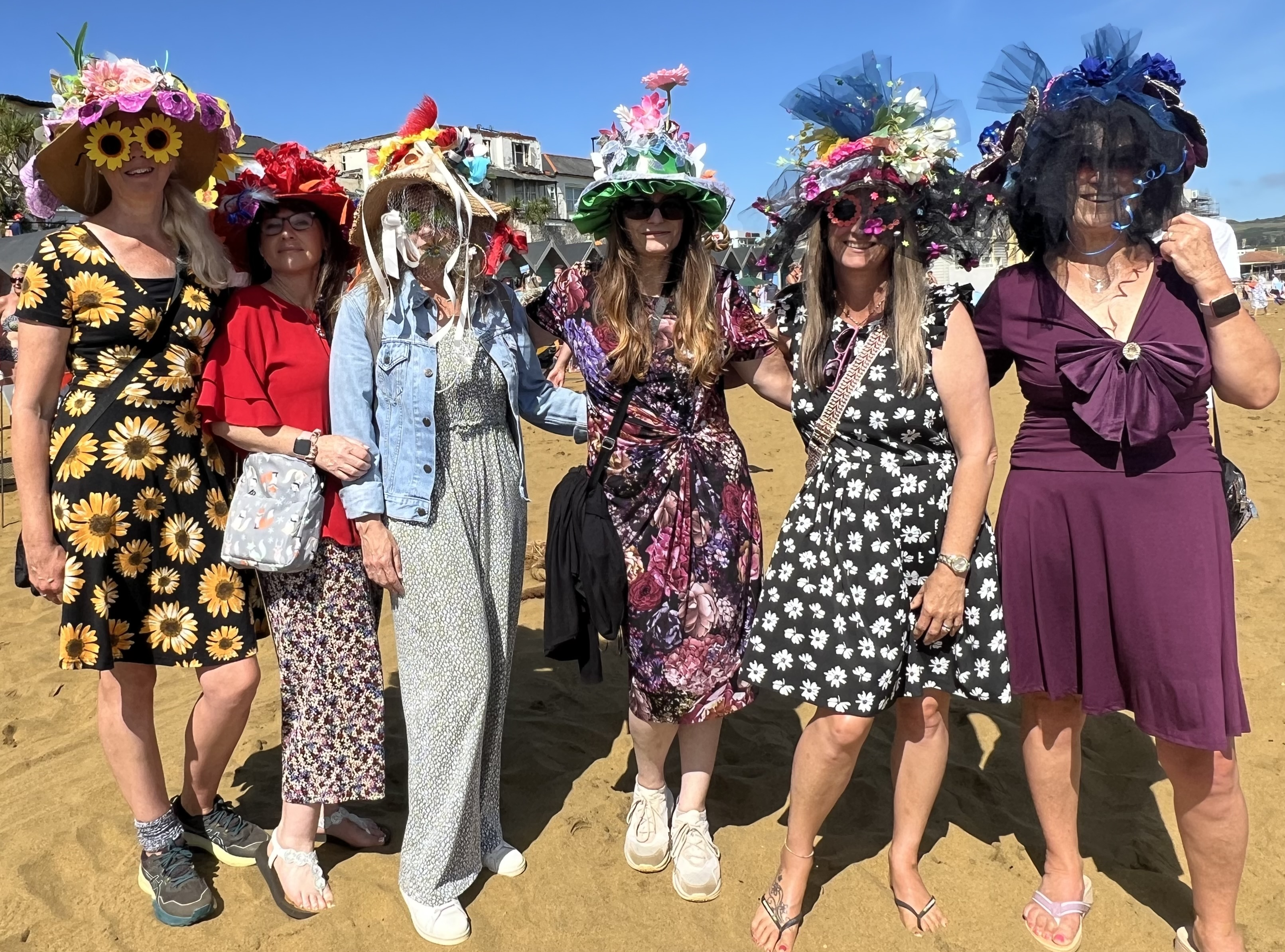
Community creations in Sandown's Hat Parade

The carnival received Arts Council England funding in 2023 and 2024 to revive Sandown's tradition of wearing hats on regatta day, fondly remembered from the town's post-war decades. Locals and visitors, including a primary school and care home, got involved in community hat-making workshops with artists commissioned to design their own extraordinary headwear. The results feature in the annual Grand Regatta Hat Parade on the beach where awards are presented for best entries. In autumn 2024, a public exhibition featuring Sandown's hats was held at the Isle of Wight's Quay Arts Centre.

=== Community facilities ===
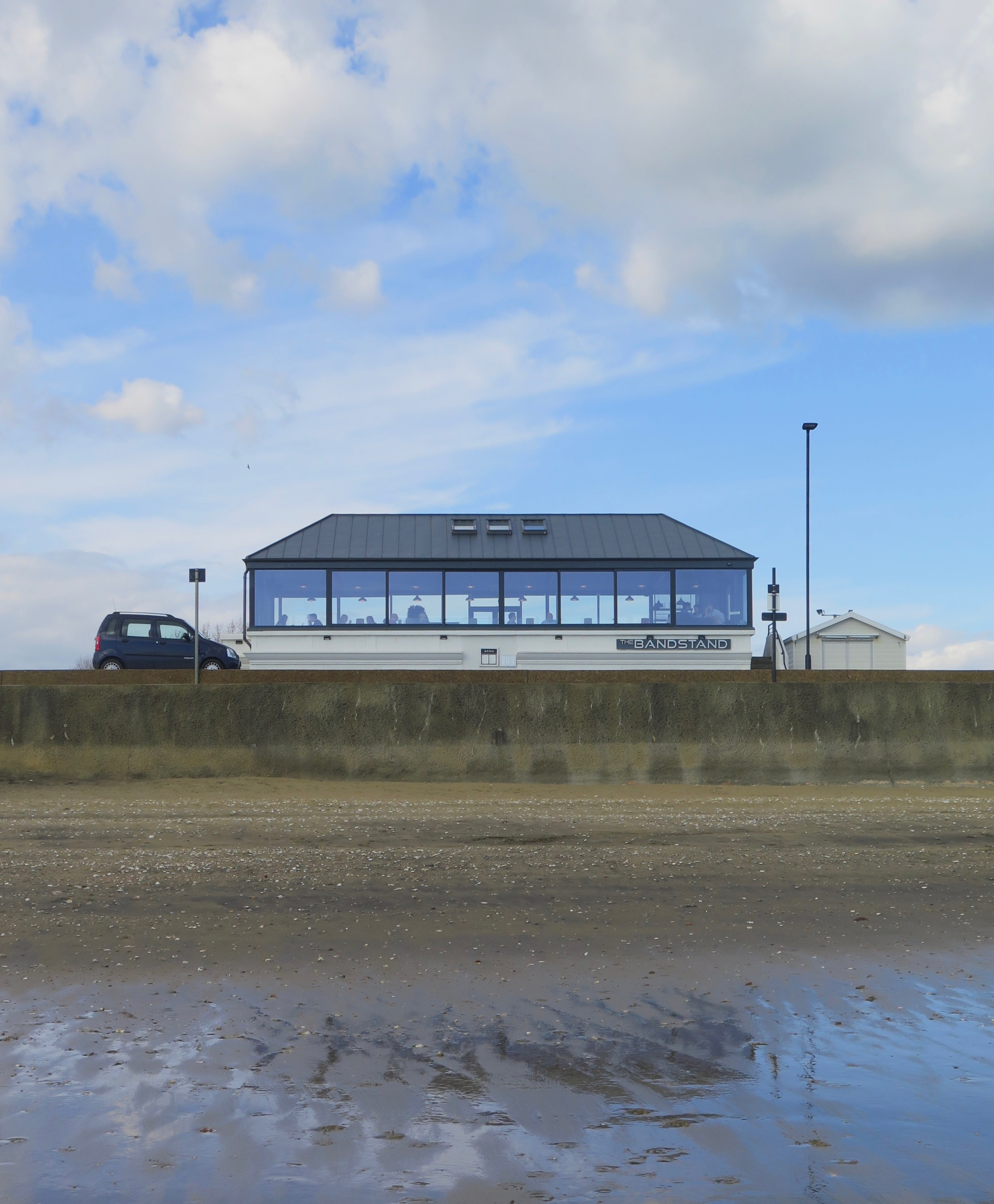
Sandown's 1920s bandstand, now a café

Sandown offers an assortment of restaurants, cafes, bars and pubs along the seafront and in the town. Sandown Pier is a popular attraction for amusements and refreshments, and there are new cafes and eating places along the seafront promenade towards Lake and Shanklin.

Boojum and Snark at 105 High Street opened in 2019 as a venue for art exhibitions and community events, with its name inspired by author Lewis Carroll who stayed across the road in the 1870s when he was writing his epic nonsense poem The Hunting of the Snark.

== Transport ==
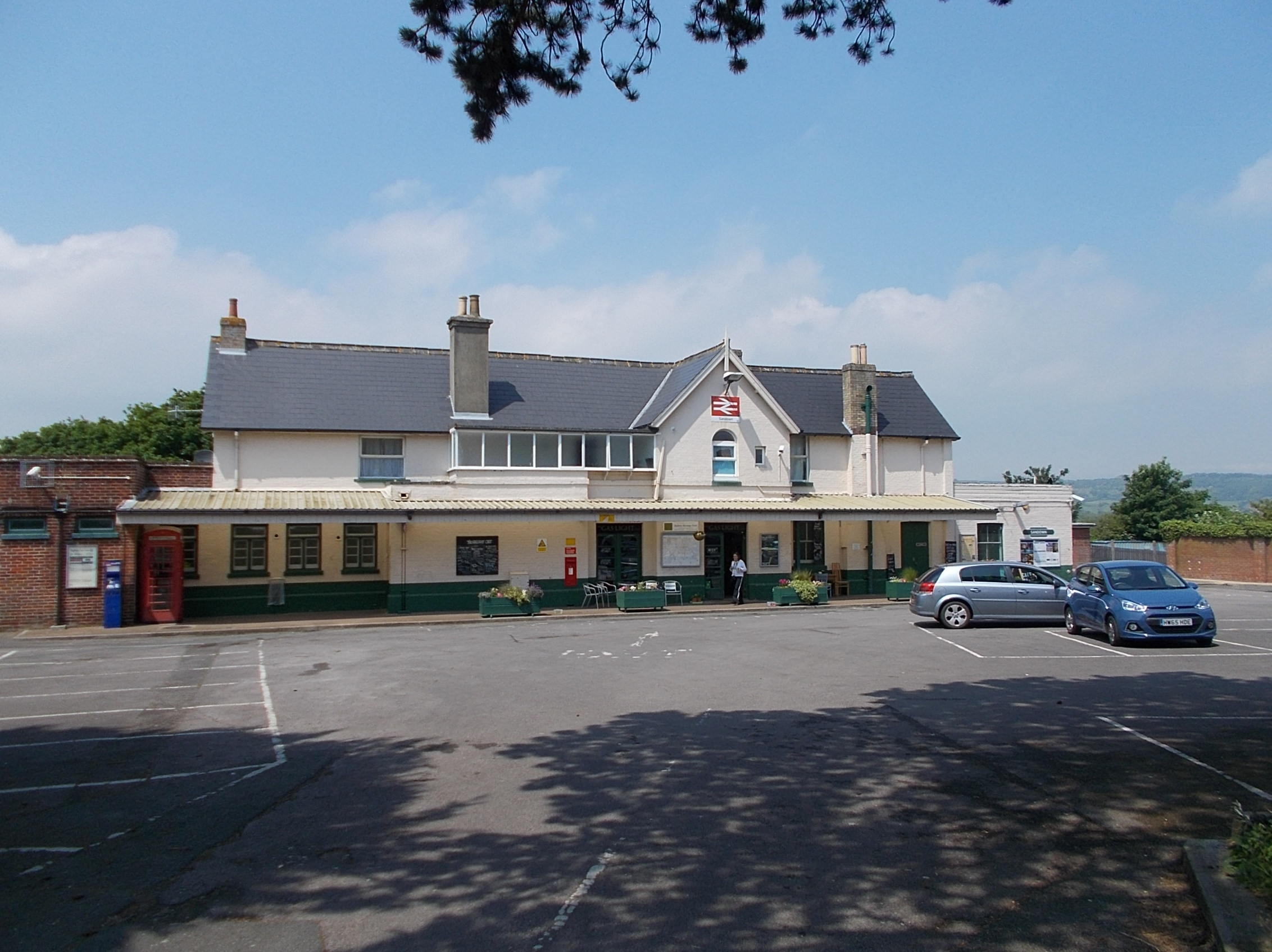
Sandown station, opened in 1864

Sandown railway station is a stop on the Island Line, the Isle of Wight's one remaining public railway line from Ryde Pier Head to Shanklin. Services are operated by South Western Railway.

Sandown is served by buses run by Southern Vectis, including route nos. 2, 3, and 8. There are direct services to Bembridge, Godshill, Newport, Ryde, Shanklin and Ventnor. Night buses run on Fridays and Saturdays. An open-top bus service, The Downs Breezer, runs in the summer. Another summer-only service is the Island Coaster, which connects Sandown with the main communities on the eastern and southern coasts and a variety of tourist attractions, including Blackgang Chine, Isle of Wight Pearl, and Alum Bay.

Pleasure steamers once called at Sandown Pier and even offered trips across the English Channel in the 1930s, but the pier's landing stage is no longer used for vessels to moor alongside.

== In popular culture ==
The UK group Take That filmed the video for their fifth single "I Found Heaven" on Sandown's beaches and sea front in 1992.

Sandown High School and locations nearby were used in the 1972 film That'll Be The Day starring David Essex, Ringo Starr, Billy Fury and Rosemary Leach.

The TV series Tiger Island, on ITV and National Geographic in 2007 and 2008, chronicled the lives of the more than twenty tigers living at Isle of Wight Zoo.

Sandown featured in the Channel 5 series Isle of Wight: Jewel of the South, shown in the UK in 2023 and 2024.

== Namesakes ==
The town of Sandown and its bay have inspired the naming of a number of Sandowns around the world, including Sandown, New Hampshire United States, Sandown, Gauteng a suburb of Johannesburg in South Africa, and Sandown Bay in South Africa's Western Cape. The former industrial area of Sandown on the Parramatta River, New South Wales, Australia was commemorated by the Sandown railway line in the western suburbs of Sydney, which ceased passenger services in 1991.

HMS Sandown, launched in 1988, was the name ship in the Sandown class of mine countermeasures vessels. Its earlier namesake was the paddle steamer and passenger ferry PS Sandown, which saw wartime service as a minesweeper.

== Notable people ==
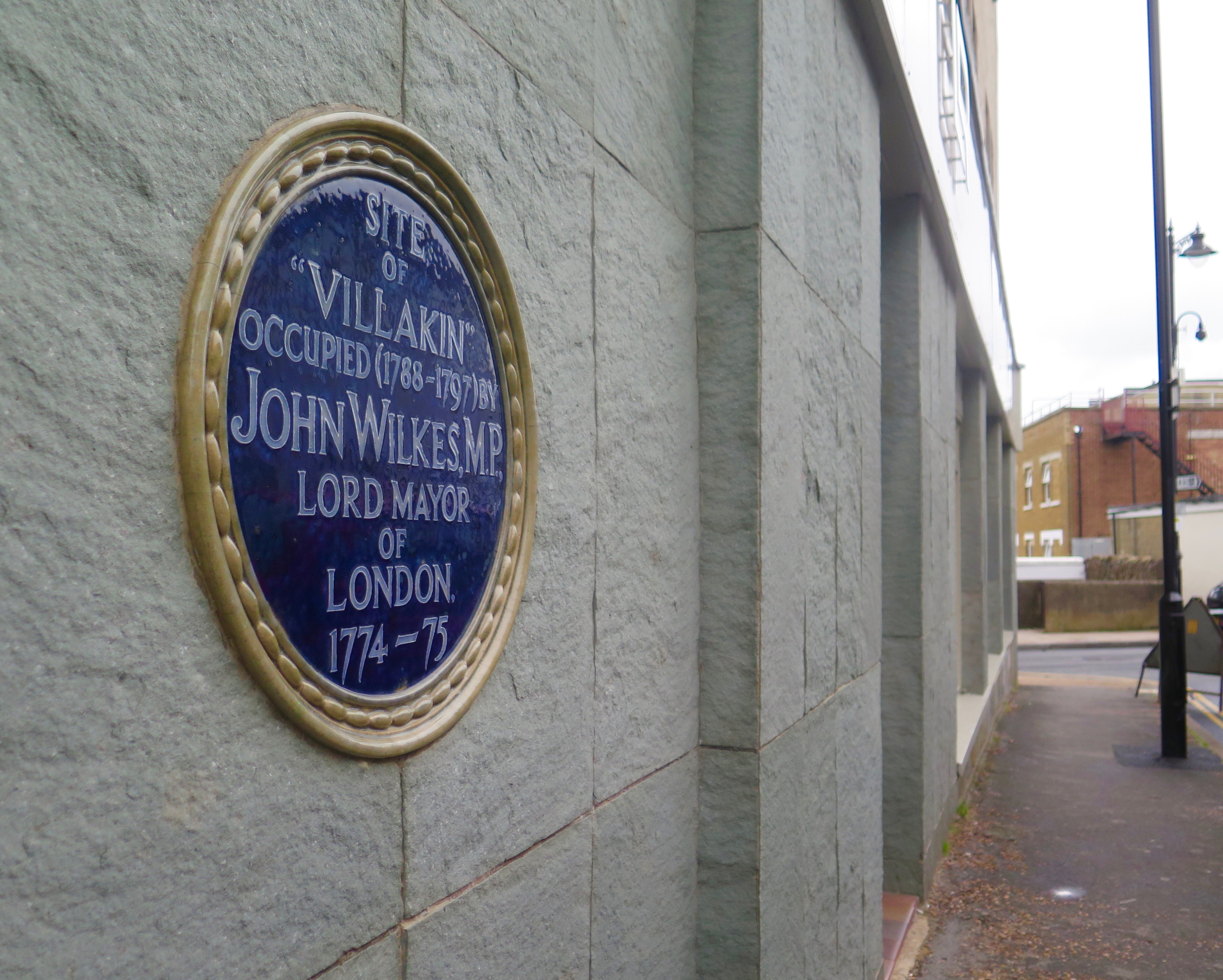
The site of John Wilkes' cottage, just off the High Street

- John Wilkes (former Lord Mayor of the City of London) stayed regularly in Sandown in the late 18th century at the place he called 'Villakin', also known as Sandham Cottage. A memorial plaque marks the site of the cottage close to the present-day High Street. On Sunday mornings, Wilkes would go to Shanklin Church, and after the service would walk across the fields to Knighton with David Garrick and his wife.
- Naturalist Charles Darwin worked on the abstract which became On the Origin of Species when staying at Sandown's King's Head Hotel in July 1858. He and his family later moved on to Norfolk House in nearby Shanklin. Darwin also visited the Isle of Wight on other occasions, and was photographed there by Julia Margaret Cameron in 1868.
- The writer George Eliot (Mary Ann Evans) stayed in Sandown during a two-week visit to the Isle of Wight in June 1863, having recently published her novels Romola and Silas Marner.
- Sir William Jardine, 7th Baronet FRS FRSE (1800–1874), naturalist and author, died in Sandown.

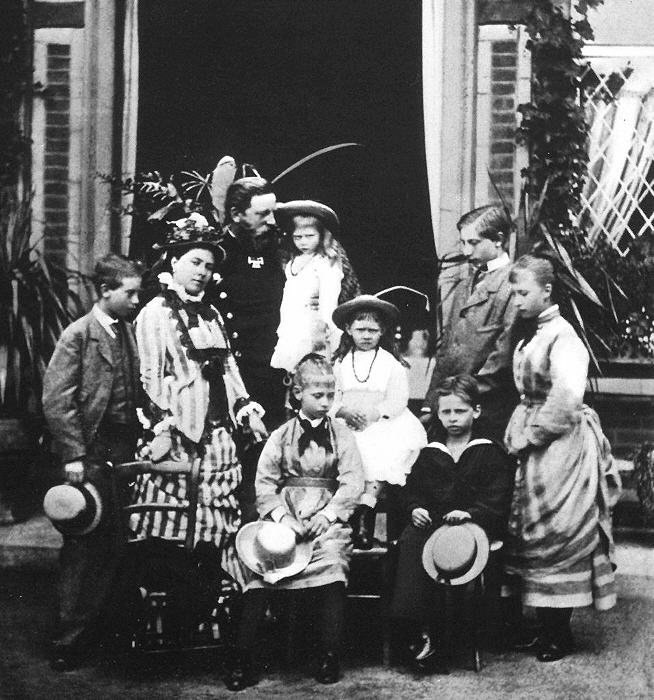
Germany's Crown Prince and Princess and their family spent the summer of 1874 in Sandown

- Frederick III, German Emperor and his consort Victoria, Princess Royal, when Crown Prince and Princess of Germany, stayed at Sandown with their children for two months in the summer of 1874. Queen Victoria, the Crown Princess's mother, travelled from Osborne House to visit them on 31 July, an event she described in her journals. The German royals commissioned a stained glass window which can still be seen at Christ Church, Sandown to commemorate their stay in the town.
- The author Lewis Carroll, the Reverend Charles Lutwidge Dodgson, spent successive summers on Sandown sea front in the 1870s, staying first at the King's Head Hotel and later at Culverton House. In 1875, while he was writing The Hunting of the Snark, he met 9-year old Gertrude Chataway whose family was staying next door. The first edition of The Hunting of the Snark is dedicated to Gertrude.
- The composer Richard Strauss (1864–1949) spent summer holidays at Sandown's Ocean Hotel in 1902 and 1903. His sketchbooks show that, while there, he worked on his Symphonia Domestica and themes that found their way into Der Rosenkavalier
- Sir Isaac Pitman worked on his system of shorthand in Sandown in the 1860s
- Cilla Black, Frankie Howerd, Tommy Cooper, Jimmy Tarbuck and Dickie Henderson were among the late 20th century performers doing summer seasons at Sandown Pier Pavilion
- Oscar-winning film director and playwright Anthony Minghella was a pupil at Sandown High School Members of the groups Level 42, Wet Leg and the Bees also went to Sandown High School.
- Edward Upward (1903–2009) long-lived author and part of the Auden Group in the 1930s, lived in Sandown from 1961 to 2004
- James Clutterbuck, cricketer
- William Darwin Fox, naturalist-clergyman, second cousin of Charles Darwin buried in Sandown.
- Thomas Field Gibson found some important fossils while staying at his beach house at Sandown.
- Eric Charles Twelves Wilson, recipient of the Victoria Cross was born in Sandown.
- Simon Moore, footballer who plays for Sunderland AFC.
- Mary Ellis, pilot in the Air Transport Auxiliary 1941–1945, later managing director of Sandown Airport. Mary died in July 2018 aged 101.

== See also ==
- Bembridge Down
- The Bay Church of England School
- List of current places of worship on the Isle of Wight
