= Wildheart Animal Sanctuary =

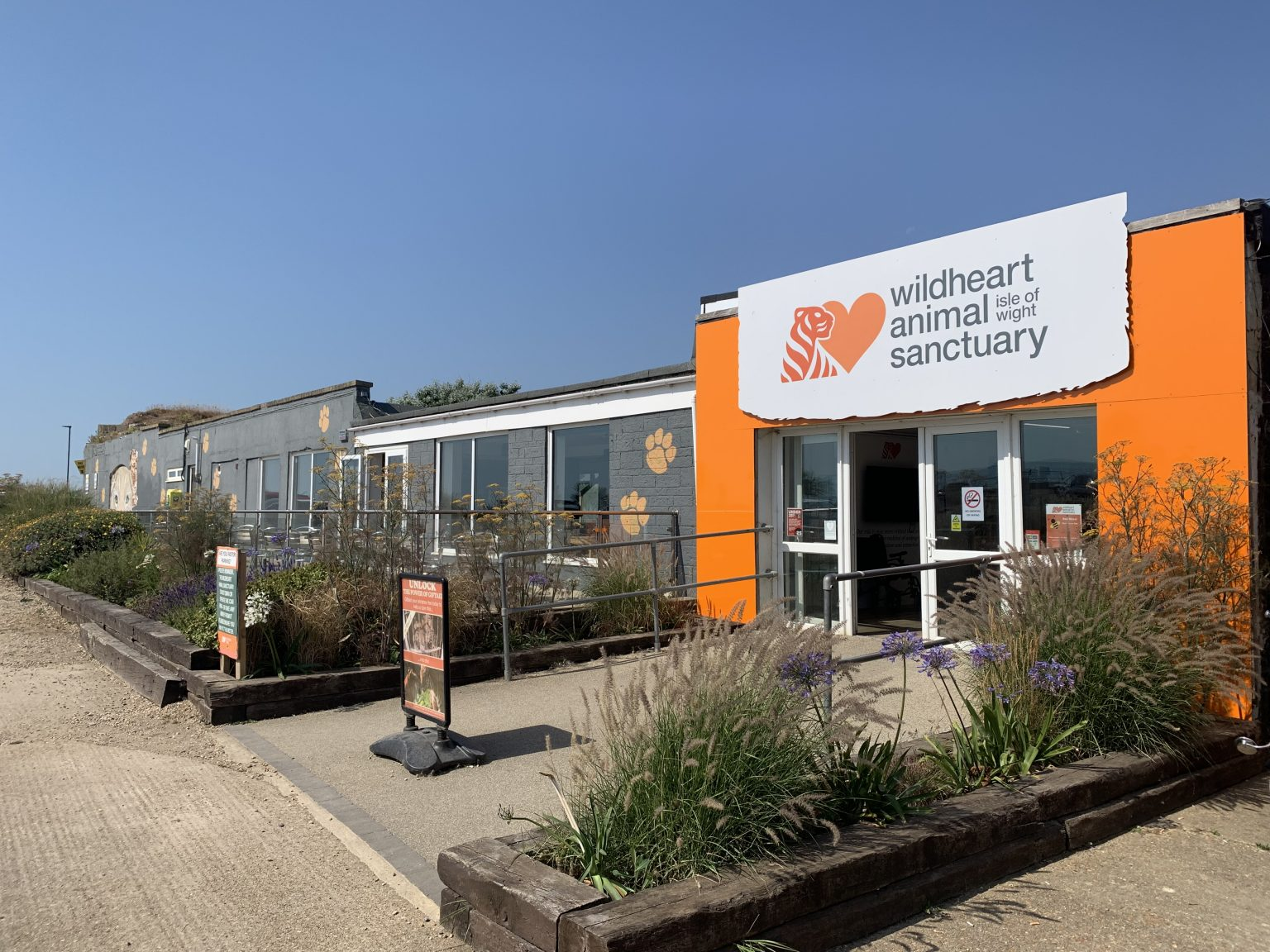
- The entrance to the Wildheart Animal Sanctuary, which is housed inside Sandown Fort.
- Interactive map of Wildheart Animal Sanctuary
- 50.6609°N 1.1394°W
- Location: Sandown, Isle of Wight, England
- Major exhibits: Tigers, Lions, Lemurs, Monkeys and other exotic animals
- Website: wildheartanimalsanctuary.org

The Wildheart Animal Sanctuary, previously known as the Isle of Wight Zoo and Sandown Zoo, is a wildlife sanctuary on the coastline of Sandown, Isle of Wight. At 8.5 acres, it is the largest collection of exotic animals on the Island.

The former Isle of Wight Zoo was privately owned, but it became a charitable trust in 2017 and was renamed as the Wildheart Animal Sanctuary in 2021. The Sanctuary is "dedicated to rescuing exotic animals from harm and rehabilitating them in their forever home".

As part of the European Endangered Species Programme, the Isle of Wight Zoo previously had success breeding several species of Madagascan animals including the critically endangered black-and-white ruffed lemur. It is now a non-breeding Sanctuary for rescued animals.

== History ==
The present-day Sanctuary is housed inside the shell of Sandown Fort, which was built in 1864. A zoo was first established on the site in the 1950s, originally known as Sandown Zoo before becoming the Isle of Wight Zoo in the 1970s. By this time it had fallen into disrepair, and was dubbed "The Slum Zoo of Britain" by The Sunday Times.

In 1976 the zoo was taken over by a new owner, Jack Corney, and over the following years it was rebuilt as a sanctuary for big cats and primates. Since Corney died in 2003, the zoo has been owned by his daughter Charlotte. In 2017, Charlotte established the Wildheart Trust, making the Isle of Wight Zoo a registered charity. It was subsequently renamed the Wildheart Animal Sanctuary in 2021.

Sandown Fort housed thirteen pumps for Operation Pluto during World War II, one of which has been restored and is on display in its original location inside the present-day Sanctuary grounds.

== Main Species ==
=== Big Cats ===
As of 2025, the Sanctuary is home to three lions; a female white lion rehomed from West Midland Safari Park, and two males rescued from a travelling circus.

Additionally there are four female tigers at the Sanctuary; two rescued from a Spanish circus, and two confiscated from a horse box at the Belarusian border. The latter were cared for by the Spanish rescue centre AAP (Animal Advocacy and Protection) before arriving at the Sanctuary in April 2023.

The Sanctuary has rescued other felids such as a family of three Eurasian lynx and two servals.

Natasha, one of the zoo's rescued tigers

=== Primates ===
In 2022, the Sanctuary opened a new primate rescue facility consisting of two dome shaped habitats, which house black, black-and-white ruffed, mongoose, red ruffed and ring-tailed lemurs. The Sanctuary is also home to capuchins and spider monkeys.

=== Bears ===
In May 2024, the Sanctuary announced that it intended to rescue two European Brown Bears from Azerbaijan. The bears arrived at the Sanctuary in June 2025.

== Conservation ==
The Sanctuary currently funds one conservation project related to its areas of special interest.

The principal project is 'Local Advocacy for Tiger Conservation in Bhadra-Kudremukh Tiger Landscape'. This project is administered by the charity Global Tiger Patrol and funded wholly by the Sanctuary. Over the year 2010/11 the Sanctuary's contribution was £10,800. In November 2011 the project won the BIAZA award for Best Conservation Project (Small Collection).

== Filming ==
The Sanctuary under its former name the Isle of Wight Zoo was the subject and main filming location for the ITV Meridian television programme Tiger Island, which debuted in May 2007. Two series were filmed, showing different aspects of zoo life including making enrichment toys and designing new enclosures.

In June 2023, the Sanctuary featured on The One Show with a short film documenting the arrival of rescued tigers Softi and Toph.
