= Church of St John the Evangelist, Sandown =

Coordinates: 50°39′29.44″N 01°09′11.66″W

Church of St. John the Evangelist, Sandown
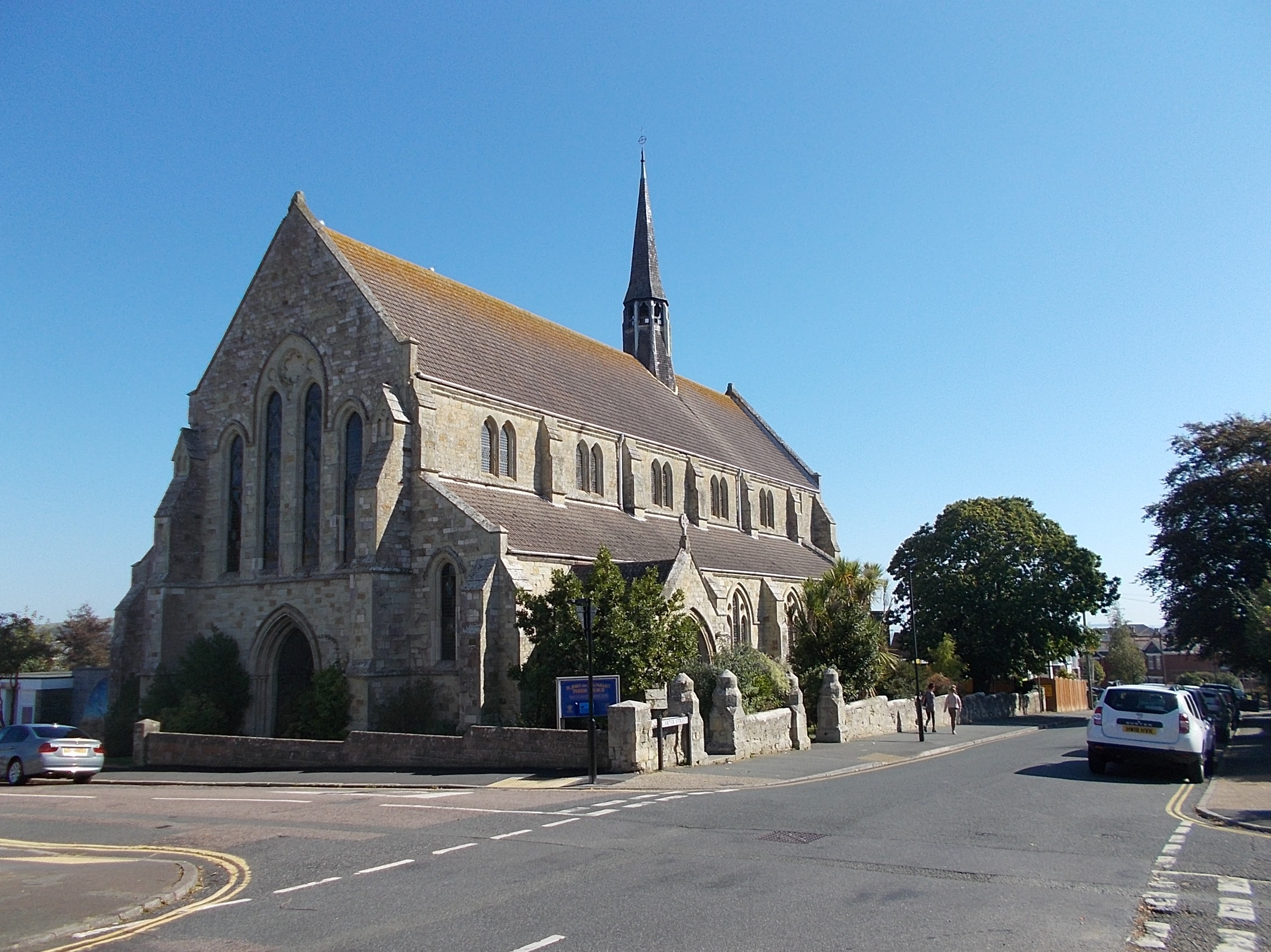
- Church of St. John the Evangelist, Sandown
- Denomination: Church of England
- Churchmanship: Broad Church
- Website: www.stjohnssandown.org.uk

History
- Dedication: St. John the Evangelist

Administration
- Province: Canterbury
- Diocese: Portsmouth
- Parish: Sandown

The Church of St. John the Evangelist, Sandown is a parish church in the Church of England located in Sandown, Isle of Wight.

== Building ==
The church was built in 1880 and 1881 by the architect Luck. This dramatic building is located at the junction of St. John's Road and Carter Street. It is a very large and high building which that seats over 600, and is one of the largest buildings in Sandown. The body of the church includes St. Nicholas's Chapel, a Lady Chapel, and a choir vestry and clergy vestry off the chancel.

== Parish status ==
The church is in a joint parish with Christ Church, Sandown.

== Organ ==
The church has a splendid pipe organ by Henry Willis dating from 1881. A specification of the organ can be found on the National Pipe Organ Register.
