= HMS Eurydice =

Two ships of the Royal Navy have borne the name HMS Eurydice, after Eurydice, a character in Greek mythology:

- HMS Eurydice (1781) was a 24-gun post ship launched in 1781 and broken up in 1834.
- HMS Eurydice (1843) was a 24-gun post ship launched in 1843. She became a training ship in 1861, and foundered in 1878.
