= Culture of the Isle of Wight =

As an island, the Isle of Wight maintains a culture close to, but distinct from, that of the south of England. A high proportion of the population are now 'overners' rather than locally born, and so with a few notable exceptions it has more often formed the backdrop for cultural events of wider rather than island-specific significance.

The Island has inspired many creative works. Local people often seek to defend their real or perceived culture, and local politics is often dictated by a desire to preserve the traditions and habits of the Island.

The first creative flowering occurred during the reign of Queen Victoria, under whose patronage the island became a fashionable destination for the gentry.

== Literature and other media ==
Alfred, Lord Tennyson was made Baron Tennyson, of Aldworth in the County of Sussex and of Freshwater on the Isle of Wight by Queen Victoria in 1884.

The poet Algernon Charles Swinburne grew up at Bonchurch, and said in a letter that he had climbed Culver Cliff at 17. He is buried at Bonchurch.

The author Maxwell Gray (Mary Gleed Tuttiett) was born in Newport, and a number of her novels, including the best-known, The Silence of Dean Maitland, are set on the island.

The isle has been the setting for several novels, including Julian Barnes's dystopian novel England, England, and detective thrillers such as The Fallen by Robert Rennick. It also features in John Wyndham's novel The Day of the Triffids and Simon Clark's sequel The Night of the Triffids.

The Iranian-born poet Mimi Khalvati was educated at Upper Chine School in Shanklin; many of her poems are about the island, especially in the book "The Chine".

Sandown-based author Edward Upward sets part of his book "In the Thirties" on the Isle of Wight.

The 1973 film That'll Be the Day, starring David Essex, Rosemary Leach and Ringo Starr, was filmed on the island, at Puckpool holiday camp, Ryde, Sandown High School, Shanklin beach and Wroxall.

The 2005 film Fragile was filmed almost entirely on the Isle of Wight, with the exception of a few exterior shots. Prominent locations featured in the film include Ryde's Union Street, the Military Road at Compton Bay, Ryde Pier and Red Funnel's Red Osprey car ferry.

The 2022 book Roman Vectis: Archaeology and Identity in the Isle of Wight, by the Isle of Wight's former county archaeologist David Tomalin, examines the nature and identity of islanders in Roman and later times.

== Painting ==
The "Isle of Wight School" of Romantic painters specialised in views of the South West Coast; prominent were George Morland and J. M. W. Turner.

== Photography ==
Julia Margaret Cameron was a prominent early photographer, who has a museum dedicated to her at Dimbola Lodge in Freshwater. She specialised in portraits of the celebrities who visited her neighbour Lord Tennyson.

Beken of Cowes, established in 1888 by pharmacist Alfred Edward Beken, pioneered yachting photography and is a leading British marine photography company.

== Local media ==
The island was one of the first British regions to get a community television station, with TV 12. In October 2002 the restricted television service licence for the Isle of Wight (Rowridge transmitter) was awarded to a new not-for-profit local television station, Solent TV, which was the first not-for-profit community television station in the UK. It went into receivership in 2007.

It is an oft-quoted statistic that 92% of islanders read the local newspaper, the Isle of Wight County Press, which is published most Fridays. In the early nineties a local radio station, Isle of Wight Radio , commenced broadcasting on 1242 medium wave, later moving to 107 and 102 FM. This is now also available via the internet, along with social media such as Island Pulse.

== Major events ==
Many events take place each year across the island, all designed to appeal to different groups of people. Many of these take place in the summer, and so attract many tourists visiting the island. A few notable examples include:

Event	Description	Running dates
Isle of Wight Festival	A music festival which takes place annually at Seaclose Park in Newport. After three early festivals featuring such acts as Jimi Hendrix, Bob Dylan and The Who, the festival was discontinued in 1970; but was revived in a modern format in 2002.	1968–1970; 2002–present
Bestival	A music festival held in the late summer, at a country park, Robin Hill. The event is considered much more alternative and diverse, which appeals to families. Many people attending wear fancy dress. A few notable acts include The Scissor Sisters and The Pet Shop Boys.	2004–2016
Isle of Wight Garlic Festival	An annually held fundraising event organised until 2006 by the Newchurch Parish Sports & Community Association and since then by the Garlic Festival Ltd. Held on the outskirts of Newchurch near Apse Heath, it has over 250 stallholders selling many locally produced foods such as garlic beer, garlic seafood and garlic ice cream. Music performances take place and the event also has a large central arena for other activities.	1985–present
Cowes Week	Cowes Week is the longest running regular regatta in the world, and takes place on the Solent.	1826–present
White Air	White Air was an extreme sports festival held in Yaverland, on the eastern side of the island, near Sandown. The event was in 2009 held in Brighton, due to difficulties between the organisers and the Isle of Wight Council.	1996–2008
Isle of Wight Walking Festival	The Isle of Wight Walking Festival is the UK's largest annual walking festival which takes place annually on the Isle of Wight each May.	1998–present
Isle of Wight Biosphere Festival	The Isle of Wight Biosphere Festival celebrates the island's designation as a UNESCO Biosphere Reserve with a range of nature events each summer.	2024–present

== Marmotinto ==
Marmotinto is the art of creating pictures using coloured sand or marble dust. It was first popularised in England at a dinner party given by George III who was taken with a display arranged under glass at his dinner table by a Bavarian named Benjamin Zobel (Memmingen, Germany, 21 September 1762 - London, England, 24 October 1830), a friend of George Morland, a painter prominent in the "Isle of Wight School" . It became popular in Victorian times as the tourist industry began and Alum Bay and Totland were briefly developed as a tourist destination for steamers. There are fine examples at Osborne House.

Although marmotinto with marble and other coloured dust was known in Italy and elsewhere on the continent, marmotinto with coloured sand is an art form possibly unique to the Isle of Wight, due to the availability of the raw materials and to the inherent limitations of the art form.

== Music ==
The Bees (UK band) are a local band who have recently met with some national success.

The band Level 42 are from Gurnard.

The Island has a full symphony orchestra, and well as several brass bands, swing and jazz groups.

Singer-songwriter Robyn Hitchcock lived on the island in the late 20th century, and occasionally refers to local geography or uses Wight-specific terms in his lyrics (the song "Let's Go Thundering" refers to "sliding down a mossy chine", for example).

Wet Leg is a British indie rock band from the Isle of Wight, founded in 2019 by Rhian Teasdale and Hester Chambers. Their debut single "Chaise Longue" became a viral hit in 2021. Their self-titled debut album (2022) debuted at number one on the UK Albums Chart, ARIA Albums Chart, and the Irish Albums Chart.

Champs are a UK based band formed of two brothers, Michael and David Champion from Niton. Their first album, Down Like Gold, was released in 2014. Their second album, Vamala, was released in 2015.Their third album, The Hard Interchange, was released in September 2019.[4] The album was created over a span of three years.

== Skateboarding ==
Local skateboarding team 'Wight Trash' and its associated retail brand was launched with the help of Inbiz and a Prince's Trust loan in April 2004. They have featured in skateboarding videos and events.

== Views of the Island ==
The Isle of Wight has traditionally seen as a place for retirees and holiday makers. The Beatles song "When I'm Sixty-Four" mentions "every summer we could rent a cottage on the Isle of Wight".

This non-threatening image is also used to comic effect by the Monty Python team in their 1976 sketch Mr Neutron:

Commander: OK. We'll bomb Neutron out. Get me Moscow! Peking! and Shanklin, Isle of Wight!

Cut to stock film of B52s on a bombing raid.

Voice Over: And so the Great Powers and the people of Shanklin, Isle of Wight, drew their net in ever-tightening circles around the most dangerous threat to peace the world has ever faced. They bombed Cairo, Bangkok, Cape Town, Buenos Aires, Harrow, Hammersmith, Stepney, Wandsworth and Enfield... But always it was the wrong place.

Today the island maintains this image, while also being seen nationally as a destination for the 'sea and sandcastles' style of family holiday. In an episode of the TV panel game QI, Alan Davies described the Isle of Wight as still stuck in the 1950s.

== Paganism ==
The Isle of Wight has an active branch of the Pagan Federation (many of whom style themselves as "Druids"), and amongst the inmates incarcerated inside Parkhurst Prison paganism makes up the third most popular religion, according to the Isle of Wight County Press.

The Isle of Wight was the last area of English paganism until 686CE when, according to Bede, Cædwalla of Wessex conquered the island, killing its inhabitants and installing Christians in their place. A "sheela-na-gig" is preserved in the gateway to Holy Cross Church in Binstead.

Historically several women were alleged to be witches (such as the nineteenth-century Bembridge woman Molly Downer), although not apparently persecuted. This seems to have been a psychiatric matter rather than religious.

== Morris Dancing ==
The Isle of Wight has many Morris sides, the newest being a mixed-sex side - Guith Morris (Guith being the name of the Island pre Roman/Saxon times); The Men of Wight, a traditional side; Bloodstone Border Morris, who are a mixed-sex border style side, named after Bloodstone Copse on the Island; The Wight Bells, an all women group established over 10 years; The Oyster Girls, who dance wearing clogs; Mr Baker's Dozen, a traditional English side; The Island Cloggies, an all-female group and Moonshine border Morris, a mixed sex group who wear black, purple, blue and green.
