= SS Irex =

Coordinates: 50°39′42.04″N 1°34′56.28″E

History

United Kingdom
- Name: Irex
- Owner: J.D. Clink, Greenock
- Builder: J. Reid & Co., Port Glasgow
- Yard number: 8L
- Launched: 10 October 1889
- Completed: December 1889
- Identification: Official number: 93224
- Fate: Wrecked, 25 January 1890

General characteristics
- Type: Sailing ship
- Tonnage: 2,348 GRT
- Length: 302 ft 2 in (92.10 m)
- Beam: 43 ft (13 m)
- Sail plan: Full-rigged ship
- Crew: 36

Irex was a sailing vessel wrecked at Scratchell's Bay on the Isle of Wight by The Needles on 25 January 1890, while on her maiden voyage.

== Ship history ==
Irex was built by J. Reid & Co. of Port Glasgow, and launched on 10 October 1889. The 2,348 gross register tons (GRT) steel-hulled three-masted ship was 302 ft 2 in (92.10 m) long, and 43 ft (13 m) in the beam.

On 24 December 1889 Irex sailed from Greenock, bound for Rio de Janeiro, under the command of Captain Hutton, carrying a cargo of 3,600 tons of iron sewerage pipes.

However, storms meant that she was obliged to shelter in Belfast Lough until 1 January 1890. She sailed again, but the winds reached hurricane strength, and she attempted to take shelter in Falmouth on the 24th, but was unable to get a pilot boat to guide her in, so continued up the English Channel towards Portland. As Irex approached the Needles, Hutton mistook the Needles Lighthouse for a light from a pilot boat, and drove his ship up onto the shore at about 10 p.m.

Large waves broke over the ship, and the captain, first mate, boatswain and a crewman were killed. At 9 a.m. Irex was seen by soldiers stationed at The Needles Batteries who alerted the Totland lifeboat. The steam collier Hampshire also come to the aid of Irex, but neither ship were able to approach Irex before noon. After nearly being smashed into Hampshire, the lifeboat abandoned the attempt to rescue the crew, and was towed back to port by Hampshire.

At 1.15 p.m. the Coastguard launched a rocket from the battery, taking a line, which caught in the rigging. As the crew attempted to reach the line, one man fell and was killed. It took them two hours to secure a hawser, which enabled the 29 survivors from the crew of 36 to be winched by breeches buoy from the ship to the cliff-top.
