= IREX =

IREX can mean:

- International Robot Exhibition, a robot trade fair held every two years in Tokyo, Japan
- iRex Technologies, the company that produced the iLiad and the iRex Digital Reader 1000 ebook devices
- International Research & Exchanges Board, an international nonprofit organization
- SS Irex, an 1890 wreck
- USS Irex, a 1944 submarine
- S/Y Irex (1884 First Class cutter)
- Instrument Rating EXamination (for pilots - CASA)
