= SS Varvassi =

Greek freighter wrecked at The Needles in a storm after engine failure

History
- Launched: 19 November 1914
- Fate: Wrecked 5 January 1947

General characteristics
- Type: Cargo ship
- Tonnage: 3,875 GRT

SS Varvassi is a wrecked ship just off the Needles lighthouse, which is at the western end of the Isle of Wight. The ship foundered about 150 metres west of the lighthouse. The Isle of Wight is off the South coast of England, near Southampton.

Varvassi was a 3,875-ton Greek merchant steamship that was wrecked on the Needles rocks in January of 1947. It was carrying a cargo of 300 tons of tangerines, 400 tons of wine (200 barrels) and iron ore. It was going from Algiers to Southampton. The ship became wrecked after an engine failure in stormy weather, and drifted onto the rocks. All 36 crew were unharmed and were rescued by Yarmouth lifeboat. About 5000-6000 crates of tangerines were salvaged off the ship and some of the wine was also salvaged. On March 29th of 1947, rough seas had tore a hole in the port side of the ship, which resulted in 50-100 barrels of wine washing up on the nearby beaches, which the local people and German POWs drank. In the summer of 1947 more barrels of wine were recovered. On January 3rd of 1948 the Varvassi had broken in half during a storm, disappearing from the surface.

There are still remains of the wreck lying just below the surface. Some parts of the wreck can be seen at very low tides. The wreck constitutes a hazard to small craft that attempt to sail too close to the lighthouse.

Any race around the Island has to face the obstacle of the Varvassi wreck site. Yacht racers see the passage between Varvassi and Goose Rock as a shortcut, many however miscalculate this.

On 20 July 2023, the UK registered motor vessel Channel Queen grounded as it passed over the Varvassi wreck near the Needles lighthouse, Isle of Wight, England while escorting a relay swim event around the island. Channel Queen was then deliberately beached in nearby Scratchell's Bay. Channel Queen was a total loss, and some on board suffered minor injuries.
