= Minute and second of arc =

Units for measuring angles

arcminute
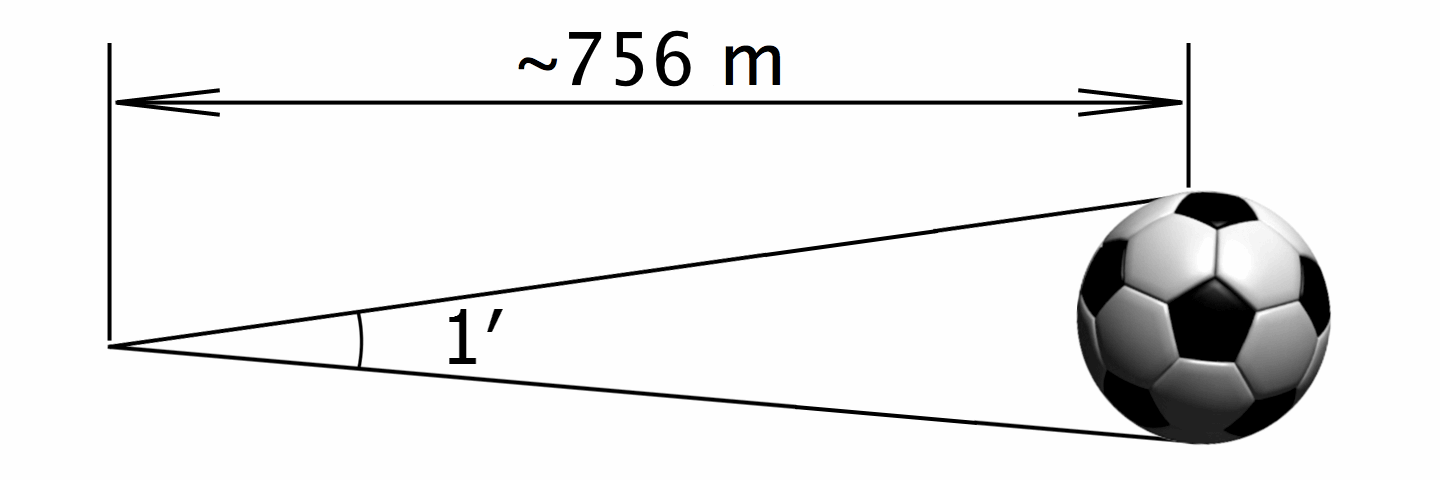
- An illustration of the size of an arcminute (not to scale). A standard association football (soccer) ball (with a diameter of 22 cm or 8.7 in) subtends an angle of 1 arcminute at a distance of approximately 756 m (2,480 ft).

General information
- Unit system: Non-SI units mentioned in the SI
- Unit of: Angle
- Symbol: ′, arcmin
- In units: Dimensionless with an arc length of approx. ≈ 0.2909/1000 of the radius, i.e. 0.2909 mm/m

Conversions
1 ′ in ...	... is equal to ...
- degrees: 1/60° = 0.016̅°
- arcseconds: 60″
- radians: π/10800 ≈ 0.000290888 rad
- milliradians: 5π/54 ≈ 0.2909 mrad
- gradians: 3/200^{g} = 0.0185^{g}
- turns: 1/21600 turn

A minute of arc, arcminute (abbreviated as arcmin), arc minute, or minute arc, denoted by the symbol ′, is a unit of angular measurement equal to 1/60 of a degree. Since one degree is 1/360 of a turn, or complete rotation, one arcminute is 1/21600 of a turn. The nautical mile (nmi) was originally defined as the arc length of a minute of latitude on a spherical Earth; therefore, the actual Earth's circumference is approximately 21600 nmi. A minute of arc is π/10800 of a radian.

A second of arc, arcsecond (abbreviated as arcsec), or arc second, denoted by the symbol ″, is a unit of angular measurement equal to 1/60 of a minute of arc, 1/3600 of a degree, 1/1296000 of a turn, and π/648000 (about 1/206264.8) of a radian.

These units originated in Babylonian astronomy as sexagesimal (base 60) subdivisions of the degree; they are used in fields that involve very small angles, such as astronomy, optometry, ophthalmology, optics, navigation, land surveying, and marksmanship.

To express even smaller angles, standard SI prefixes can be employed; the milliarcsecond (mas) and microarcsecond (μas), for instance, are commonly used in astronomy. For a two-dimensional area, such as on (the surface of) a sphere, square arcminutes or seconds may be used.

== Symbols and abbreviations ==
The prime symbol ′ (U+2032) designates the arcminute, though a single quote ' (U+0027) is commonly used where only ASCII characters are permitted. One arcminute is thus written as 1′. It is also abbreviated as arcmin or amin.

Similarly, double prime ″ (U+2033) designates the arcsecond, though a double quote " (U+0022) is commonly used where only ASCII characters are permitted. One arcsecond is thus written as 1″. It is also abbreviated as arcsec or asec.

Sexagesimal system of angular measurement
Unit	Value	Symbol		Abbreviations	In radians, approx.
Degree	1/360 turn	°	Degree	deg	17.4532925 mrad
Arcminute	1/60 degree	′	Prime	arcmin, amin, am, MOA	290.8882087 μrad
Arcsecond	1/60 arcminute = 1/3600 degree	″	Double prime	arcsec, asec, as	4.8481368 μrad
Milliarcsecond	0.001 arcsecond = 1/3600000 degree	‴	Triple prime	mas	4.8481368 nrad
Microarcsecond	0.001 mas = 0.000001 arcsecond	⁗	Quadruple prime	μas	4.8481368 prad

In celestial navigation, seconds of arc are rarely used in calculations, the preference usually being for degrees, minutes, and decimals of a minute, for example, written as 42° 25.32′ or 42° 25.322′. This notation has been carried over into marine GPS and aviation GPS receivers, which normally display latitude and longitude in the latter format by default. However, degrees, minutes, seconds (DMS notation) is not uncommon.

== Common examples ==
In general, by simple trigonometry, it can be derived that the angle $\theta$ subtended by an object of diameter or length $d$ at a distance $D$ is given by the following expression:

$$\theta = 2\arctan\left(\frac{d}{2D}\right)$$

One arcminute (1′) is the approximate distance two contours can be separated, and can still be distinguished, by a person with 20/20 vision. The average apparent diameter of the full Moon is about 31′, or 0.52°.

One arcsecond (1″) is the angle subtended by:

- a U.S. dime coin (0.705 in; 17.9 mm) at a distance of 3.7 kilometres (2.3 mi)
- object 0.485 millimetres from 100 metres, alternatively 1 millimetre from 206.265 metres.
- in Imperial system, object 1/16 inch viewed from 67 feet 1 3/4 inches
- 66.48 ms of stars' movement across sky (15.041″/s)
- an object of diameter 725.27 km at a distance of one astronomical unit (149597870.7 km)
- an object of diameter 45866916 km at one light-year (9460730472580.8 km)
- an object of diameter one astronomical unit at a distance of one parsec, per the definition of the latter.

Also notable examples of size in arcseconds are:

- Hubble Space Telescope has calculational resolution of 0.05 arcseconds and actual resolution of almost 0.1 arcseconds, which is close to the diffraction limit.
- At crescent phase, Venus measures between 60.2 and 66 seconds of arc.

One milliarcsecond (1 mas) is about the size of a half dollar (1.205 in; 30.6 mm), seen from a distance equal to that between the Washington Monument and the Eiffel Tower (around 6,300 km or 3,900 mi).

One microarcsecond is about the size of a period at the end of a sentence in the Apollo mission manuals left on the Moon as seen from Earth.

One nanoarcsecond is about the size of a nickel (0.835 in; 21.2 mm) on the surface of Neptune as observed from Earth.

== History ==
The concepts of degrees, minutes, and seconds—as they relate to the measure of both angles and time—derive from Babylonian astronomy and time-keeping. Influenced by the Sumerians, the ancient Babylonians divided the Sun's perceived motion across the sky over the course of one full day into 360 degrees. Each degree was subdivided into 60 minutes and each minute into 60 seconds. Thus, one Babylonian degree was equal to four minutes in modern terminology, one Babylonian minute to four modern seconds, and one Babylonian second to 1/15 (approximately 0.067) of a modern second.

== Uses ==
=== Astronomy ===
Comparison of angular diameter of the Sun, Moon, planets and the International Space Station. True representation of the sizes is achieved when the image is viewed at a distance of 103 times the width of the "Moon: max." circle. For example, if the "Moon: max." circle is 10 cm wide on a computer display, viewing it from 10.3 m (11.3 yards) away will show true representation of the sizes.

Since antiquity, the arcminute and arcsecond have been used in astronomy: in the ecliptic coordinate system as latitude (β) and longitude (λ); in the horizon system as altitude (Alt) and azimuth (Az); and in the equatorial coordinate system as declination (δ). All are measured in degrees, arcminutes, and arcseconds. The principal exception is right ascension (RA) in equatorial coordinates, which is measured in time units of hours, minutes, and seconds.

Contrary to what one might assume, minutes and seconds of arc do not directly relate to minutes and seconds of time, in either the rotational frame of the Earth around its own axis (day), or the Earth's rotational frame around the Sun (year). The Earth's rotational rate around its own axis is 15 minutes of arc per minute of time (360 degrees / 24 hours in day); the Earth's rotational rate around the Sun (not entirely constant) is roughly 24 minutes of time per minute of arc (from 24 hours in day), which tracks the annual progression of the Zodiac. Both of these factor in what astronomical objects you can see from surface telescopes (time of year) and when you can best see them (time of day), but neither are in unit correspondence. For simplicity, the explanations given assume a degree/day in the Earth's annual rotation around the Sun, which is off by roughly 1%. The same ratios hold for seconds, due to the consistent factor of 60 on both sides.

The arcsecond is also often used to describe small astronomical angles such as the angular diameters of planets (e.g. the angular diameter of Venus which varies between 10″ and 60″); the proper motion of stars; the separation of components of binary star systems; and parallax, the small change of position of a star or Solar System body as the Earth revolves about the Sun. These small angles may also be written in milliarcseconds (mas), or thousandths of an arcsecond. The unit of distance called the parsec, abbreviated from the parallax angle of one arc second, was developed for such parallax measurements. The distance from the Sun to a celestial object is the reciprocal of the angle, measured in arcseconds, of the object's apparent movement caused by parallax.

The European Space Agency's astrometric satellite Gaia, launched in 2013, can approximate star positions to 7 microarcseconds (μas).

Apart from the Sun, the star with the largest angular diameter from Earth is R Doradus, a red giant with a diameter of 0.05″. Because of the effects of atmospheric blurring, ground-based telescopes will smear the image of a star to an angular diameter of about 0.5″; in poor conditions. this increases to 1.5″ or even more. The dwarf planet Pluto has proven difficult to resolve because its angular diameter is about 0.1″. Techniques exist for improving seeing on the ground. Adaptive optics, for example, can produce images around 0.05″ on a 10 m class telescope.

Space telescopes are not affected by the Earth's atmosphere but are diffraction limited. For example, the Hubble Space Telescope can reach an angular size of stars down to about 0.1″.

=== Cartography ===
Minutes (′) and seconds (″) of arc are also used in cartography and navigation. At sea level, one minute of arc along the equator equals exactly one geographical mile (not to be confused with international mile or statute mile) along the Earth's equator or approximately one nautical mile (1,852 metres; 1.151 miles). A second of arc, one sixtieth of this amount, is roughly 30 metres (98 feet). The exact distance varies along meridian arcs or any other great circle arcs because the figure of the Earth is slightly oblate (bulges a third of a percent at the equator).

Positions are traditionally given using degrees, minutes, and seconds of arcs for latitude, the arc north or south of the equator, and for longitude, the arc east or west of the Prime Meridian. Any position on or above the Earth's reference ellipsoid can be precisely given with this method. However, when it is inconvenient to use base-60 for minutes and seconds, positions are frequently expressed as decimal fractional degrees to an equal amount of precision. Degrees given to three decimal places (1/1000 of a degree) have about 1/4 the precision of degrees-minutes-seconds (1/3600 of a degree) and specify locations within about 120 metres (390 feet). For navigational purposes positions are given in degrees and decimal minutes, for instance, the Needles Lighthouse is at 50°39′44.2″N 1°35′30.5″W.

=== Property cadastral surveying ===
Related to cartography, property boundary surveying using the metes and bounds system and cadastral surveying relies on fractions of a degree to describe property lines' angles in reference to cardinal directions. A boundary "mete" is described with a beginning reference point, the cardinal direction North or South followed by an angle less than 90 degrees and a second cardinal direction, and a linear distance. The boundary runs the specified linear distance from the beginning point, the direction of the distance being determined by rotating the first cardinal direction the specified angle toward the second cardinal direction. For example, North 65° 39′ 18″ West 85.69 feet would describe a line running from the starting point 85.69 feet in a direction 65° 39′ 18″ (or 65.655°) away from north toward the west.

=== Firearms ===
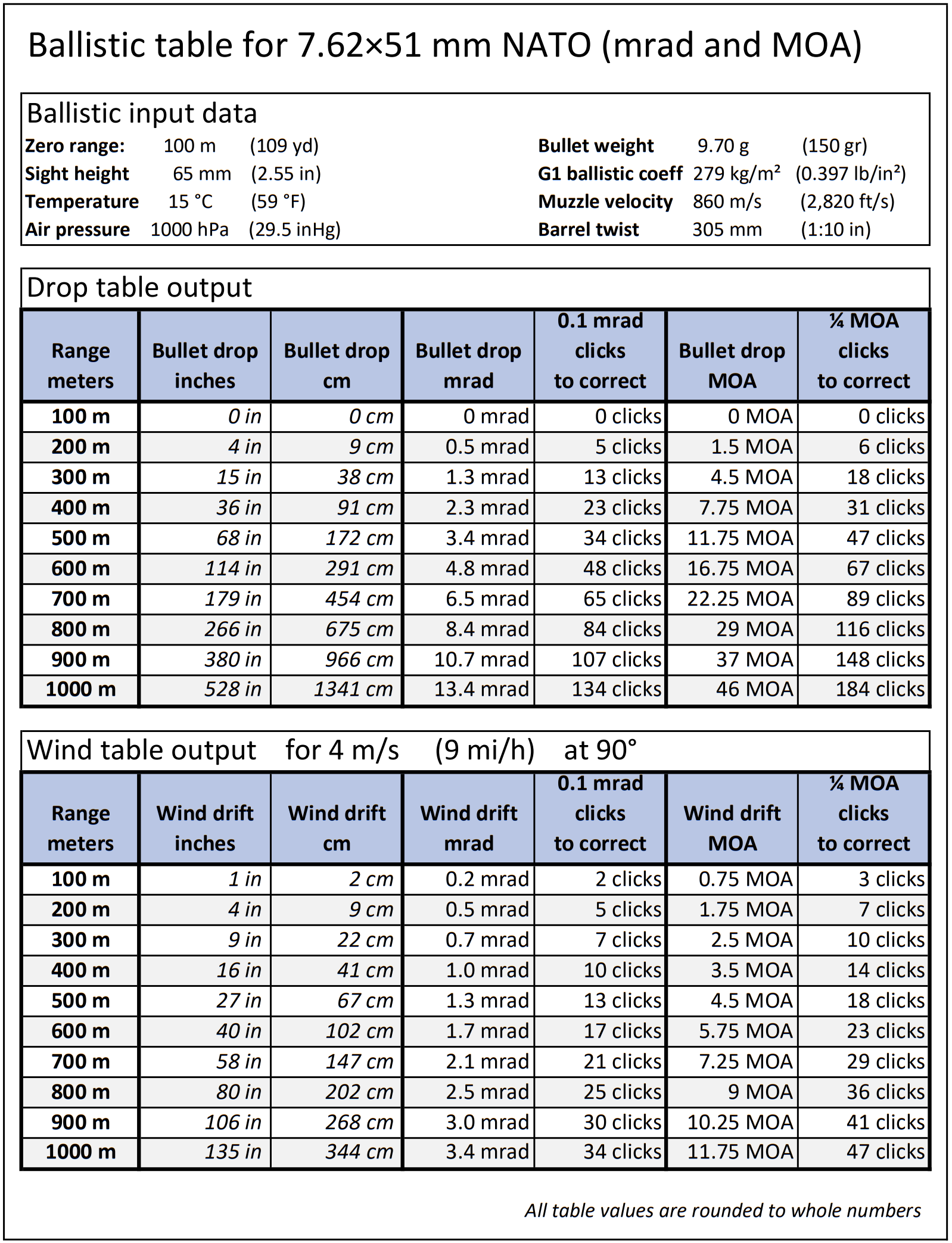
Example ballistic table for a given 7.62×51mm NATO load. Bullet drop and wind drift are shown both in mrad and minute of angle.

The arcminute is commonly found in the firearms industry and literature, particularly concerning the precision of rifles, though the industry refers to it as minute of angle (MOA). It is especially popular as a unit of measurement with shooters familiar with the imperial measurement system because 1 MOA subtends a circle with a diameter of 1.047 inches (which is often rounded to just 1 inch) at 100 yards (2.66 cm at 91 m or 2.908 cm at 100 m), a traditional distance on American target ranges. The subtension is linear with the distance, for example, at 500 yards, 1 MOA subtends 5.235 inches and, at 1,000 yards, 1 MOA subtends 10.47 inches. Since many modern telescopic sights are adjustable in half (1/2), quarter (1/4) or eighth (1/8) MOA increments, also known as clicks, zeroing and adjustments are made by counting 2, 4 and 8 clicks per MOA respectively.

For example, if the point of impact is 3 inches high and 1.5 inches left of the point of aim at 100 yards (which for instance could be measured by using a spotting scope with a calibrated reticle, or a target delineated for such purposes), the scope needs to be adjusted 3 MOA down, and 1.5 MOA right. Such adjustments are trivial when the scope's adjustment dials have a MOA scale printed on them, and even figuring the right number of clicks is relatively easy on scopes that click in fractions of MOA. This makes zeroing and adjustments much easier:

- To adjust a 1/2 MOA scope 3 MOA down and 1.5 MOA right, the scope needs to be adjusted 3 × 2 = 6 clicks down and 1.5 x 2 = 3 clicks right
- To adjust a 1/4 MOA scope 3 MOA down and 1.5 MOA right, the scope needs to be adjusted 3 x 4 = 12 clicks down and 1.5 × 4 = 6 clicks right
- To adjust a 1/8 MOA scope 3 MOA down and 1.5 MOA right, the scope needs to be adjusted 3 x 8 = 24 clicks down and 1.5 × 8 = 12 clicks right

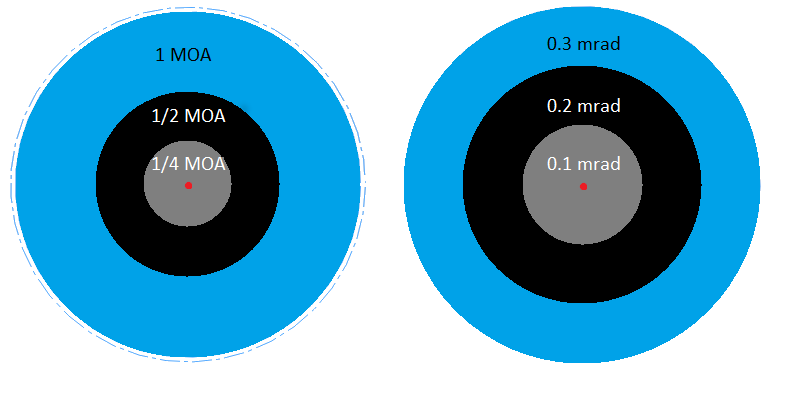
Comparison of minute of arc (MOA) and milliradian (mrad)

Another common system of measurement in firearm scopes is the milliradian (mrad). Zeroing an mrad based scope is easy for users familiar with base ten systems. The most common adjustment value in mrad based scopes is 1/10 mrad (which approximates 1/3 MOA).

- To adjust a 1/10 mrad scope 0.9 mrad down and 0.4 mrad right, the scope needs to be adjusted 9 clicks down and 4 clicks right (which equals approximately 3 and 1.5 MOA respectively).

One thing to be aware of is that some MOA scopes, including some higher-end models, are calibrated such that an adjustment of 1 MOA on the scope knobs corresponds to exactly 1 inch of impact adjustment on a target at 100 yards, rather than the mathematically correct 1.047 inches. This is commonly known as the Shooter's MOA (SMOA) or Inches Per Hundred Yards (IPHY). While the difference between one true MOA and one SMOA is less than half of an inch even at 1,000 yards, this error compounds significantly on longer range shots that may require adjustment upwards of 20–30 MOA to compensate for the bullet drop. If a shot requires an adjustment of 20 MOA or more, the difference between true MOA and SMOA will add up to 1 inch or more. In competitive target shooting, this might mean the difference between a hit and a miss.

The physical group size equivalent to m minutes of arc can be calculated as follows: group size = tan(m/60) × distance. In the example previously given, for 1 minute of arc, and substituting 3,600 inches for 100 yards, 3,600 tan(1/60) ≈ 1.047 inches. In metric units, 1 MOA at 100 metres ≈ 2.908 centimetres.

Sometimes, a precision-oriented firearm's performance will be measured in MOA. This simply means that under ideal conditions (i.e. no wind, high-grade ammo, clean barrel, and a stable mounting platform such as a vise or a benchrest used to eliminate shooter error), the gun is capable of producing a group of shots whose center points (center-to-center) fit into a circle, the average diameter of circles in several groups can be subtended by that amount of arc. For example, a 1 MOA rifle should be capable, under ideal conditions, of repeatably shooting 1-inch groups at 100 yards. Most higher-end rifles are warrantied by their manufacturer to shoot under a given MOA threshold (typically 1 MOA or better) with specific ammunition and no error on the shooter's part. For example, Remington's M24 Sniper Weapon System is required to shoot 0.8 MOA or better, or be rejected from sale by quality control.

Rifle manufacturers and gun magazines often refer to this capability as sub-MOA, meaning a gun consistently shooting groups under 1 MOA. This means that a single group of 3 to 5 shots at 100 yards, or the average of several groups, will measure less than 1 MOA between the two furthest shots in the group, i.e. all shots fall within 1 MOA. If larger samples are taken (i.e., more shots per group) then group size typically increases, however this will ultimately average out. If a rifle was truly a 1 MOA rifle, it would be just as likely that two consecutive shots land exactly on top of each other as that they land 1 MOA apart. For 5-shot groups, based on 95% confidence, a rifle that normally shoots 1 MOA can be expected to shoot groups between 0.58 MOA and 1.47 MOA, although the majority of these groups will be under 1 MOA. What this means in practice is if a rifle that shoots 1-inch groups on average at 100 yards shoots a group measuring 0.7 inches followed by a group that is 1.3 inches, this is not statistically abnormal.

The metric system counterpart of the MOA is the milliradian (mrad or 'mil'), being equal to 1/1000 of the target range, laid out on a circle that has the observer as centre and the target range as radius. The number of milliradians on a full such circle therefore always is equal to 2π × 1000, regardless the target range. Therefore, 1 MOA ≈ 0.2909 mrad. This means that an object spanning 1 mrad on the reticle is at a range that is in metres equal to the object's linear size in millimetres (e.g. an object of 100 mm subtending 1 mrad is 100 metres away). So, there is no conversion factor required, contrary to the MOA system. A reticle with markings (hashes or dots) spaced with a one mrad apart (or a fraction of a mrad) are collectively called a mrad reticle. If the markings are round they are called mil-dots.

In the table below, conversions from mrad to metric values are exact (e.g. 0.1 mrad equals exactly 10 mm at 100 metres), while conversions of minutes of arc to both metric and imperial values are approximate.

Conversion of various sight adjustment increment
Increment, or click	(mins of arc)	(milli- radians)	At 100 m			At 100 yd
Increment, or click	(mins of arc)	(milli- radians)	(mm)	(cm)	(in)	(in)
1/12′	0.083′	0.024 mrad	2.42 mm	0.242 cm	0.0958 in	0.087 in
0.25/10 mrad	0.086′	0.025 mrad	2.5 mm	0.25 cm	0.0985 in	0.09 in
1/8′	0.125′	0.036 mrad	3.64 mm	0.36 cm	0.144 in	0.131 in
1/6′	0.167′	0.0485 mrad	4.85 mm	0.485 cm	0.192 in	0.175 in
0.5/10 mrad	0.172′	0.05 mrad	5 mm	0.5 cm	0.197 in	0.18 in
1/4′	0.25′	0.073 mrad	7.27 mm	0.73 cm	0.29 in	0.26 in
1/10 mrad	0.344′	0.1 mrad	10 mm	1 cm	0.39 in	0.36 in
1/2′	0.5′	0.145 mrad	14.54 mm	1.45 cm	0.57 in	0.52 in
1.5/10 mrad	0.516′	0.15 mrad	15 mm	1.5 cm	0.59 in	0.54 in
2/10 mrad	0.688′	0.2 mrad	20 mm	2 cm	0.79 in	0.72 in
1′	1.0′	0.291 mrad	29.1 mm	2.91 cm	1.15 in	1.047 in
1 mrad	3.438′	1 mrad	100 mm	10 cm	3.9 in	3.6 in

- 1′ at 100 yards is about 1.047 inches
- 1′ ≈ 0.291 mrad (or 29.1 mm at 100 m, approximately 30 mm at 100 m)
- 1 mrad ≈ 3.44′, so 1/10 mrad ≈ 1/3′
- 0.1 mrad equals exactly 1 cm at 100 m, or exactly 0.36 inches at 100 yards

=== Human vision ===
In humans, 20/20 vision is the ability to resolve a spatial pattern separated by a visual angle of one minute of arc, from a distance of twenty feet. A 20/20 letter subtends 5 minutes of arc total.

=== Materials ===
The deviation from parallelism between two surfaces, for instance in optical engineering, is usually measured in arcminutes or arcseconds. In addition, arcseconds are sometimes used in rocking curve (ω-scan) x ray diffraction measurements of high-quality epitaxial thin films.

=== Manufacturing ===
Some measurement devices make use of arcminutes and arcseconds to measure angles when the object being measured is too small for direct visual inspection. For instance, a toolmaker's optical comparator will often include an option to measure in "minutes and seconds".

== See also ==
- Gradian
- Degree (angle) § Subdivisions
- Sexagesimal § Modern usage
- Square minute
- Square second
- Steradian
- Milliradian
- Nautical mile
