= Benjamin Zobel =

German painter (1762–1830)

- Born: Benjamin Zobel; 21 September 1762
- Died: 24 October 1830 (aged 68)

Benjamin Zobel (21 September 1762 – 24 October 1830) was a German-British painter, who developed the technique of sandpainting, also called marmotinto. Examples of these sandpaintings exist in the Memmingen city museum archives in Germany, the Victoria and Albert Museum in London, and Dundurn Castle in Hamilton, Ontario.

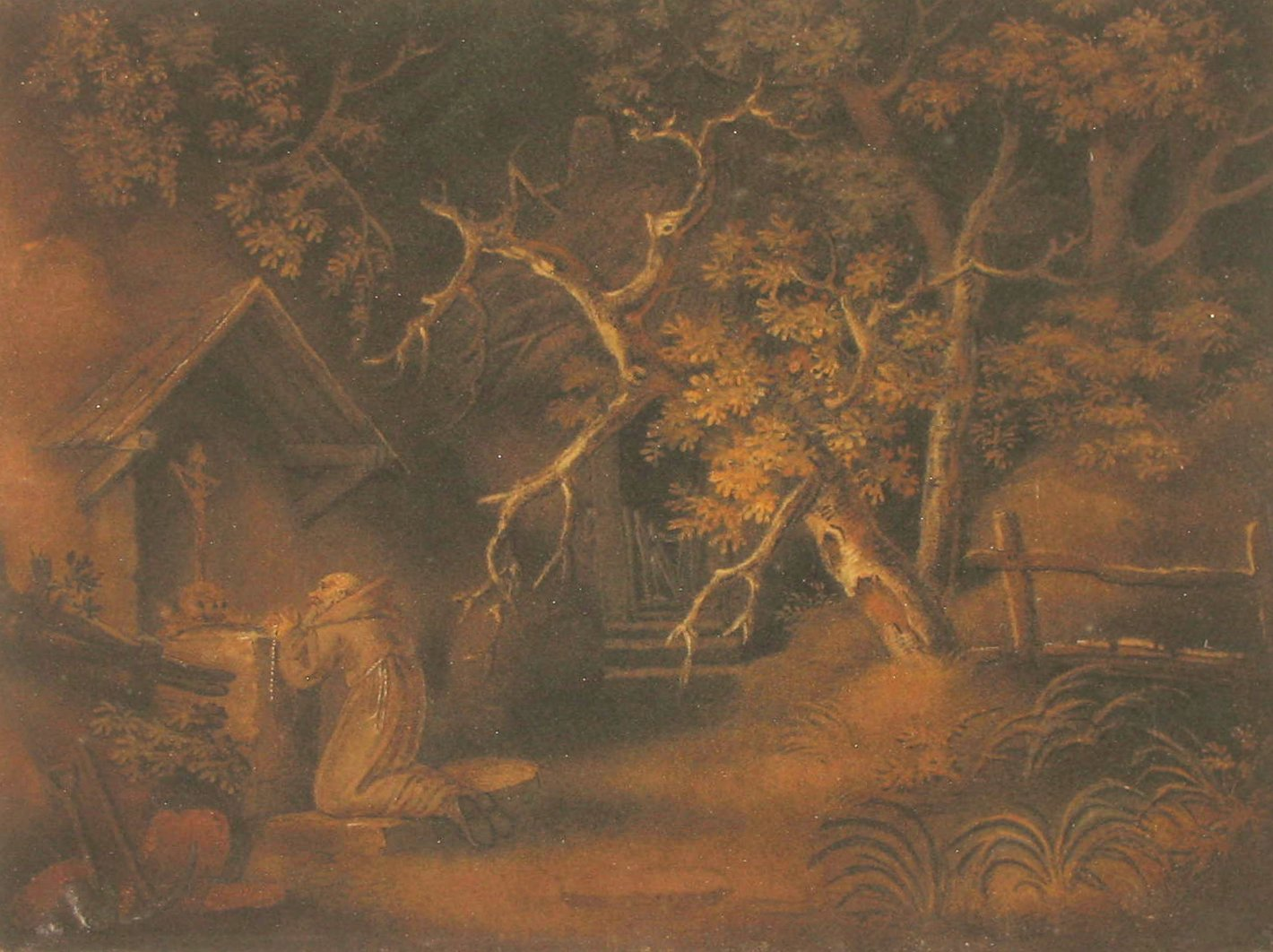
"The Hermit" - Sand Painting by Benjamin Zobel

Zobel was born in Memmingen, Holy Roman Empire, at Weinmarkt 7, the family home and pastry business. His father Johann Georg Zobel was a master pastry-chef. Benjamin learned this craft from him, becoming a master pastry-chef at the age of 20. He left Germany soon thereafter, spent two years in Amsterdam, and then moved to London. His career in London began as a master pastry-chef at the court of the German-speaking King George III. Not only was Benjamin a gifted pastry chef, but he had also become an artist. Benjamin was asked to create table decorations (tray-painting or table-decking), using colored sugars on silver platters at the center of banquet tables at the royal court. These table decorations were popular at the time and involved creating various figures such as flowers, animals, or fruit. At the end of the meal, the colored sugars would be swept away. King George III suggested making longer lasting pictures and Benjamin Zobel developed a technique using colored sand fixed to wood or pasteboard using glue. Many of Benjamin Zobel's sandpaintings feature animals and country scenes similar to those seen in the paintings of his friend George Morland, a painter prominent in the "Isle of Wight School". The Isle of Wight is well known for being a source of colored sands (Culture of the Isle of Wight). Zobel died in London.

Benjamin Zobel's son George James Jenkins Zobel (2 December 1811 London, UK – 18 June 1881 Surrey, UK) and great-great-uncle Elias Zobel (2 November 1677 Memmingen, Germany – 20 April 1718 Prague, Czech Republic) were also noted artists.

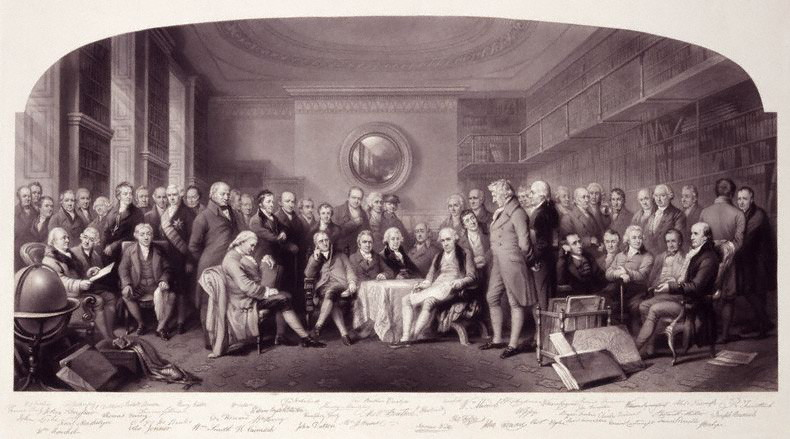
"Men of Science" - Engraving by George Zobel

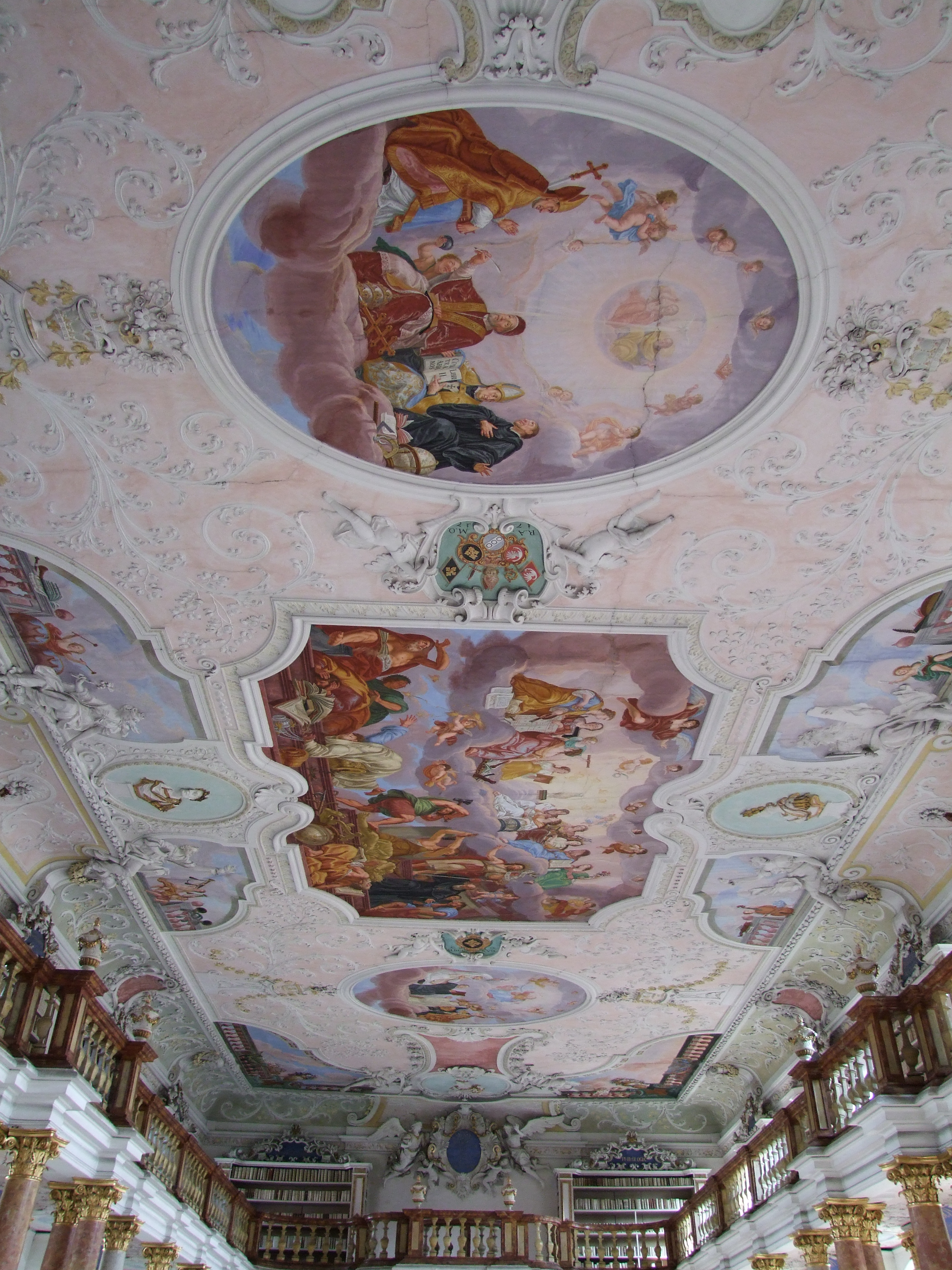
Ceiling fresco by Elias Zobel at the Ottobeuren Abbey, Germany
