= Needles Lighthouse =

Lighthouse on the Isle of Wight, UK

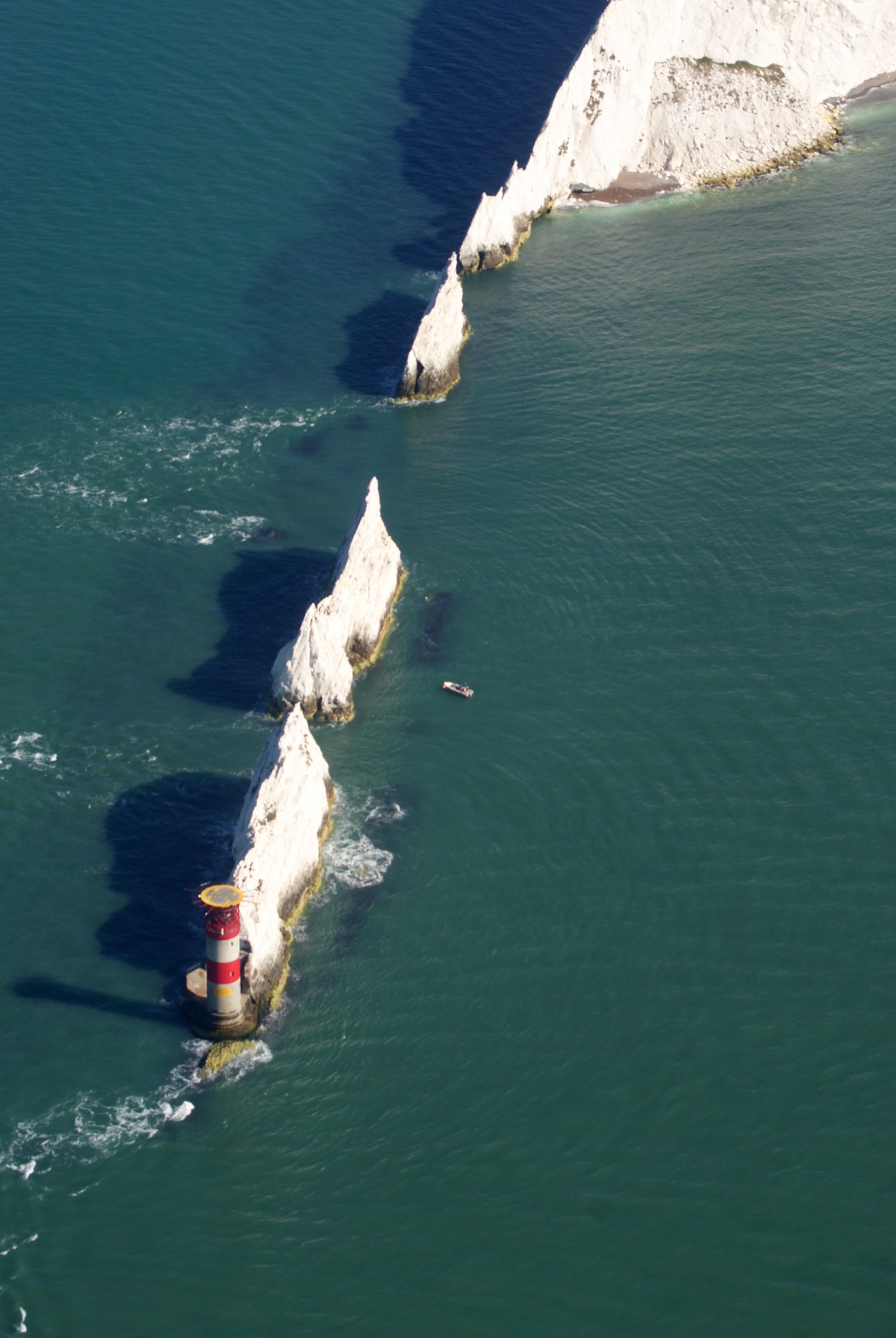
- Aerial view of Needles Lighthouse
- Location: Alum Bay; Isle of Wight; England
- OS grid: SZ2895484811
- Coordinates: 50°39′44.2″N 1°35′30.5″W

Tower
- Constructed: 1786 (first)
- Built by: James Walker
- Construction: granite tower
- Automated: 1994
- Height: 31 m (102 ft)
- Shape: cylindrical tower with lantern and helipad above lantern
- Markings: tower with red and white bands
- Operator: Trinity House
- Heritage: Grade II listed building
- Fog signal: two blasts every 30s.

Light
- First lit: 1859 (current)
- Focal height: 24 m (79 ft)
- Lens: 2nd order 700mm fixed lens
- Intensity: white: 12,300 candela red (intensified): 3,950 candela red: 1,800 candela green 2,860 candela
- Range: white: 16 nmi (30 km; 18 mi) red and green: 11 nmi (20 km; 13 mi)
- Characteristic: Oc (2) WRG 20s.

The Needles Lighthouse is an active 19th century lighthouse on the outermost of the chalk rocks at The Needles on the Isle of Wight in the United Kingdom, near sea level. Designed by James Walker for Trinity House, it was constructed from granite blocks and completed in 1859 at a cost of £20,000. It stands 33.25 metres (109.1 ft) high and is a circular tower with straight sides. It replaced an earlier light tower on top of a cliff overhanging Scratchell's Bay, which was first lit on 29 September 1786.

== The first lighthouse ==
In 1781 a group of merchants and ship owners petitioned Trinity House for navigation lights to be provided around the western approaches to the Solent. The response was positive, but it was not until 1785 that construction began, on three new lighthouses: one on the clifftop above the Needles, one on Hurst Point and one on St Catherine's Down (which was left unfinished and never lit); all three were designed by Richard Jupp.

From September the following year the Needles light was operational. It was described as 'a low truncated cone, situated on the highest point of the lofty cliffs [...], and near the edge of the cliff, forming the western extremity of the island'; however, its height of 496 feet (151 m) above sea level meant it was often obscured by fog and sea mists, a problem that eventually led to its replacement some 70 years later. Illumination was provided by 13 Argand lamps with parabolic reflectors; The light initially shone white, but on 1 March 1840 it was altered to display a red light, so as not to be confused with the newly erected lighthouse on St Catherine's Point. Prior to its decommissioning, the light shone red to seaward but white from St Alban's Head to Hurst Point.

== The current lighthouse ==
=== History ===
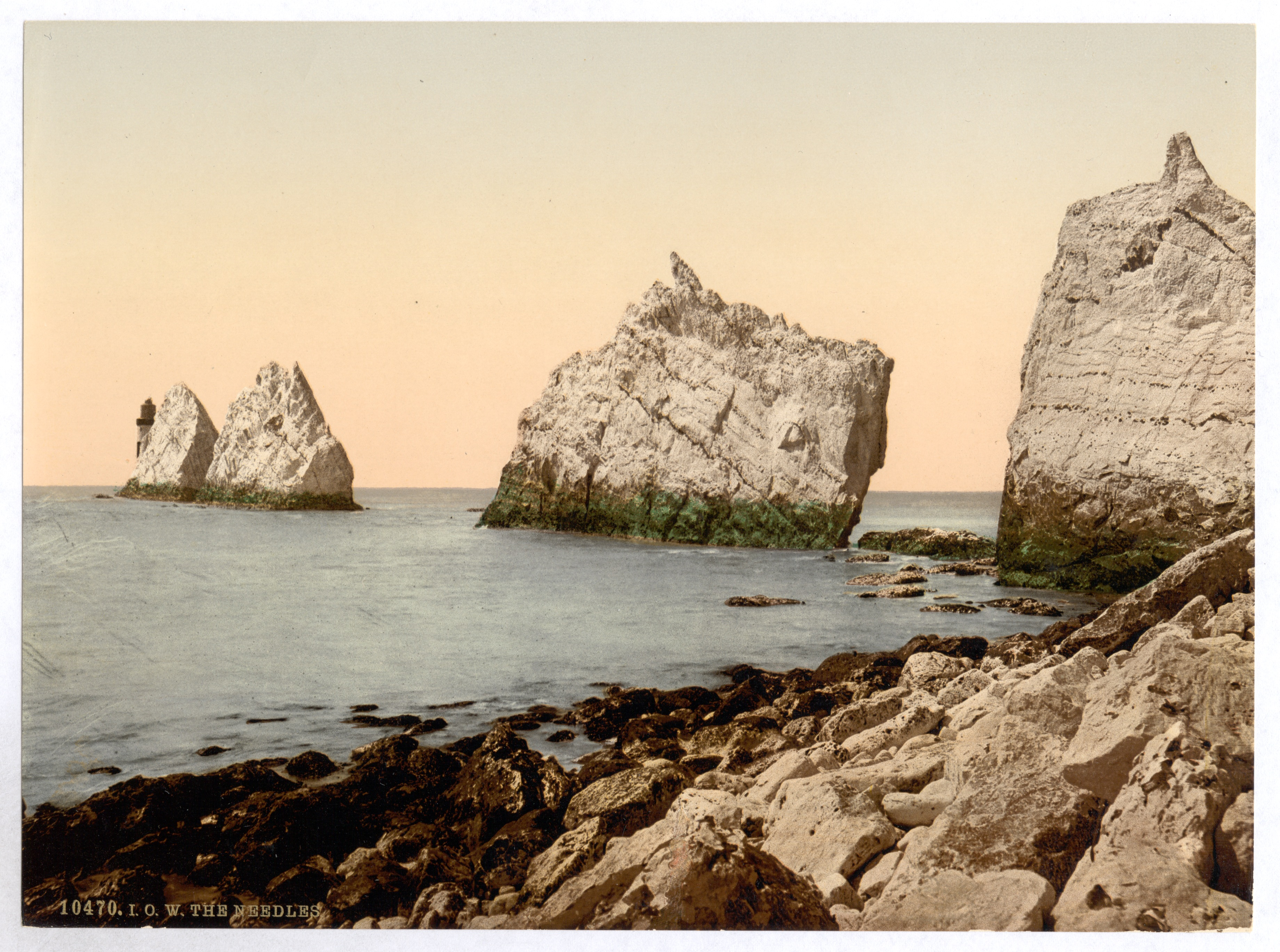
The Needles c.1890

Before work could begin on the new tower, a sizeable section of rock was cut away to provide a level base. Tunnels were also excavated within the rock behind the tower to provide rooms for storage. An oil burner, with four concentric wicks, provided the light source atop the new tower; it was set within a large (first-order) fixed catadioptric optic provided by Henry-Lepaute of Paris. Keepers' accommodation was provided within the lighthouse, which was to be staffed by a team of three keepers (of whom, at any one time, two would be on duty in the tower and one on shore leave, by monthly rotation).

The lighthouse was first lit on 1 January 1859. It initially displayed a fixed red light with a white sector indicating a clear approach running south of Durlestone Head and past a pair of sandbanks: South-west Shingles and Dolphin Bank. Later a narrow white sector marked the approach from the north-east past Warden Ledge; By 1884 a further (green) sector had been added and the light made occulting.

The tower itself had initially been left as plain granite 'not coated nor coloured', but in 1886, so as to make it stand out more prominently against the cliffs during the day, it was painted with a broad black stripe around the middle; the metalwork of the lantern was also painted black, and dark curtains were hung within the glass when the lamp was not in use.

In 1922, a more powerful incandescent paraffin vapour burner was installed, which increased the intensity of the light from 35,000 to 500,000 candlepower.

During the Second World War, the lantern, lens and lamp were badly damaged in a German aerial attack. After the war the lighthouse was repaired: in 1946, a new electric light was installed (powered by diesel generators providing 100 volt direct current); then, in 1948, a new, second-order fixed catadioptric optic was made for the lighthouse by Chance Brothers, to replace the one damaged in the war.

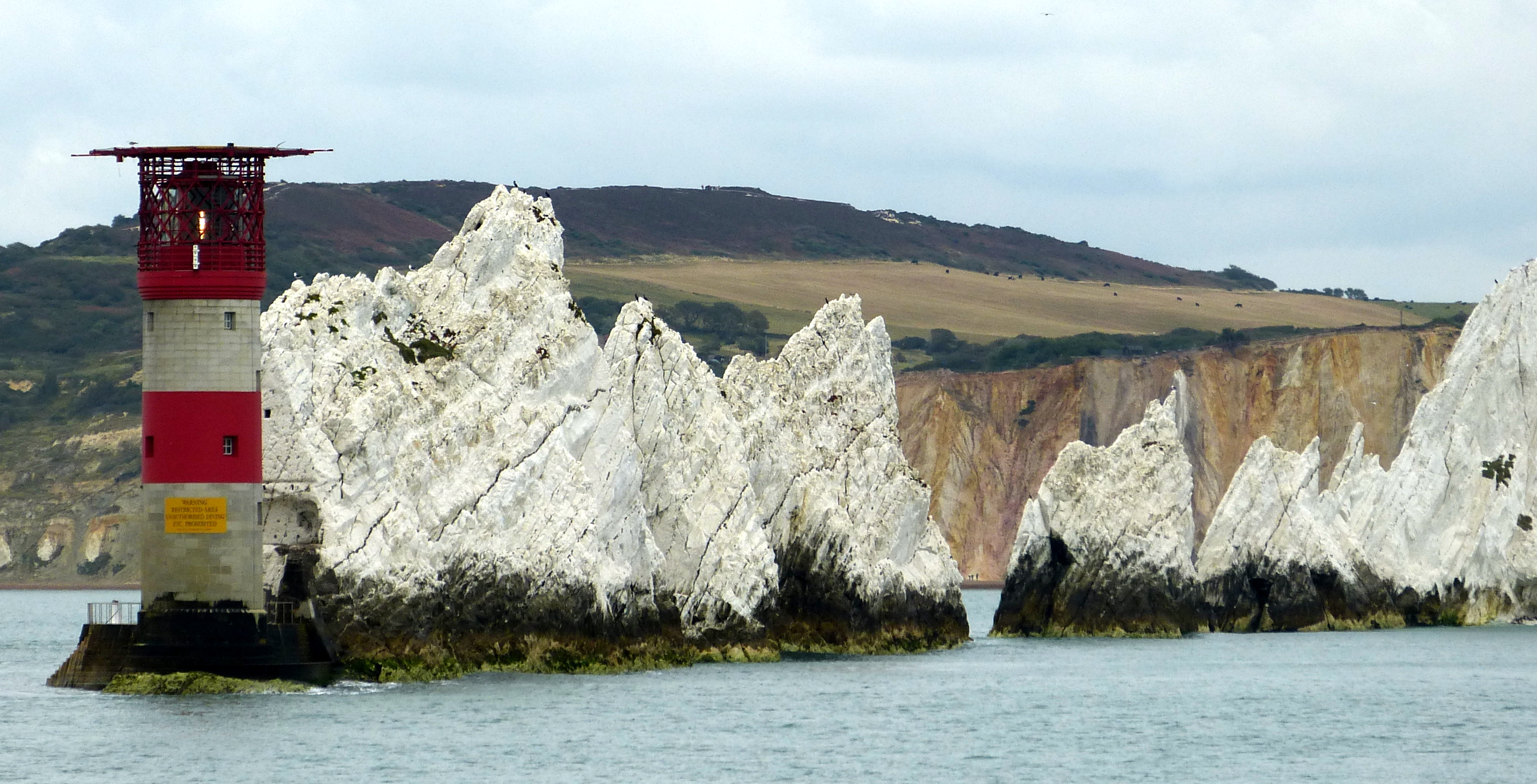
The lighthouse with helipad.

Before automation, the lighthouse was staffed by a three-man crew operating a 24-hour watch, serving one month on / one month off, living in rudimentary conditions in three levels below the light. In 1987, a helipad was added to the top of the lighthouse, which was manufactured and installed by Multiforce (twin brothers Martin and Neil Hammond). During installation, the workforce were required to live on the lighthouse (with the lighthouse keepers having the ability to dismiss any workers due to the cramped living conditions). By the early 1990s the Needles was the last Trinity House lighthouse to be powered by 100 V DC electricity from its own generators. Before it could become fully automated, a submarine power cable had to be laid, bringing 240 V mains electricity to the lighthouse from the island. By the time the last keepers left on 8 December 1994 the Needles was one of the last three remaining staffed rock lighthouses in England and Wales.

==== Fog signalling apparatus ====
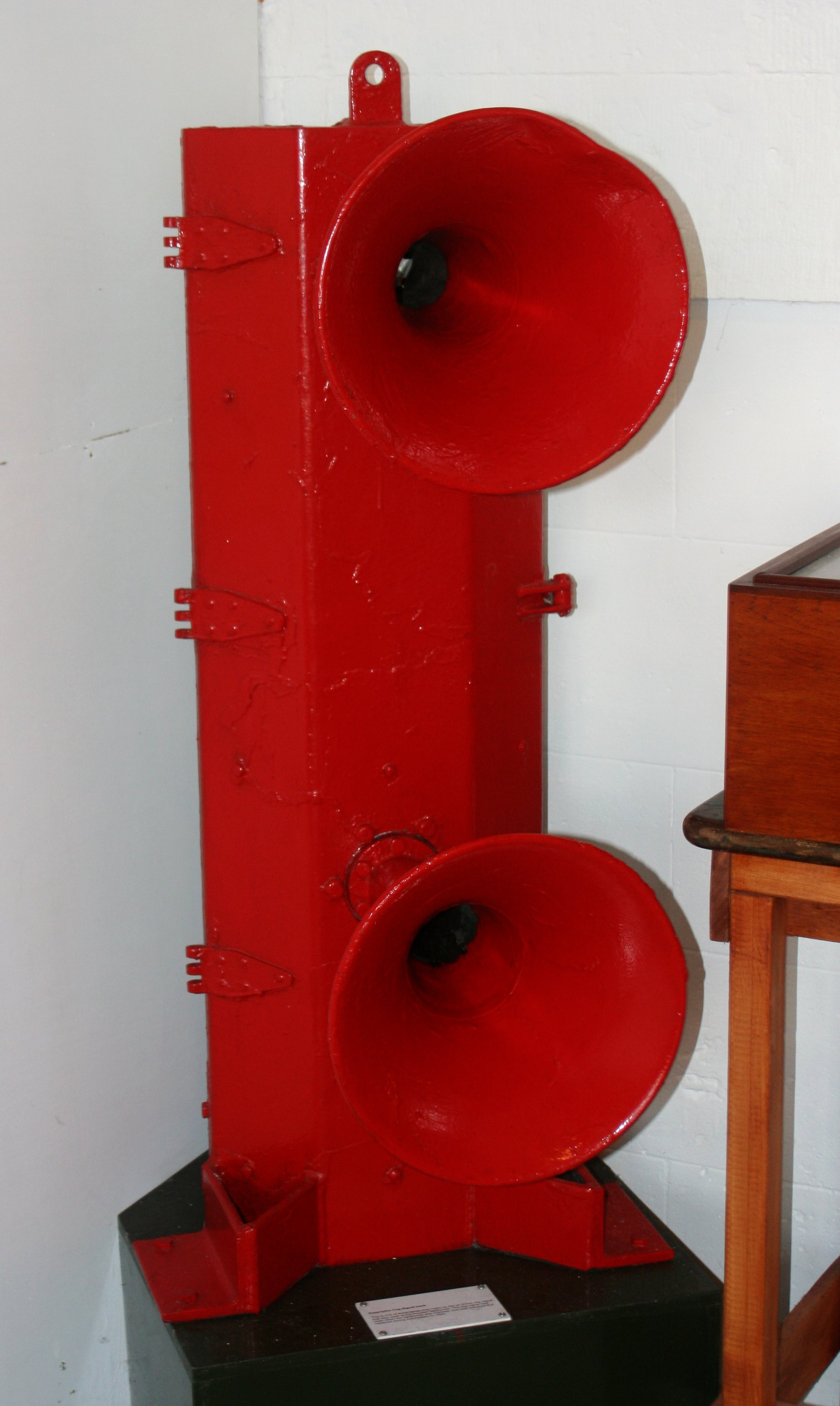
One of the sets of supertyfon horns formerly installed on the lighthouse.

Initially the lighthouse had been provided with a 3 cwt (100 kg) bell, hung beneath the gallery, to serve as a fog signal. The bell was struck once every 7.5 seconds; it was sounded by a clockwork mechanism, but using it was 'an arduous piece of work, for the driving weights are very heavy and need to be frequently wound up'.

In 1906, a reed fog signal was installed, together with a pair of oil engines in the basement of the tower to provide compressed air; it sounded from three acoustic horns which protruded through the roof of the lantern, giving one long blast every fifteen seconds. In 1946, as part of the electrification of the light, Gardner diesel-driven generators replaced the oil engines; these also powered compressors for the fog horn, which were installed along with a set of air tanks just below the lantern room.

By 1964, the reeds had been replaced with two sets of 'supertyfon' air horns, mounted on the parapet surrounding the lantern, which sounded twice every 30 seconds. In 1994, these were in turn replaced by electric emitters as part of the automation process.

=== Present day ===
Today the main lamp is a 1500W bulb; the fixed optic with its coloured sectors remains in use as of 2019. Due to the condition of the chalk strata on which the lighthouse was built, in April 2010 a £500,000 underpinning project was announced, designed to stop the lighthouse falling into the sea. Over a 12-week period from early June, civil marine contractors Nuttall John Martin excavated a trench around the base of the lighthouse, to install a ring of stabilising posts, reinforced with concrete. Upgrade works took place in 2023, during which redundant equipment was removed; in May of that year the range of the light was reduced.

== See also ==
- List of lighthouses in England
