= Molly Downer =

Alleged witch

Molly Downer was reportedly the last witch on the Isle of Wight.

== Biography ==
Told as a ballad in Ballads of the Isle of Wight, Downer lived in Hillway near Bembridge, a thatched cottage now known as Witches Hatch. The cottage dates back to 1558.

Sources differ in her heritage; she was either the illegitimate daughter of a local vicar, the Reverend Barwis of Niton, who left a small amount of money to subsist on when he died, or from a wealthy family who made their fortune from smuggling. Downer herself would entice customs men in order to get free alcohol. She became a recluse.

Local people began to consider her a witch and one woman called Harriet began to taunt and harass her, resulting in Molly cursing her that should any good fortune fall upon her, she would might die before possession, which duly happened in 1847. Rare visitors to her cottage, often "charitable" ladies pressing religious tracts upon her (which she studiously ignored), reported it to be hung with bottles containing unknown liquids and dolls with pins in them. Many local people attested to her curative powers as a "charmer" against minor illnesses. Eventually she was found dead by a woman who lent her books, and was buried without rites in Brading Churchyard.

== Legacy ==
Downer was the inspiration for an ale from Ventnor Brewery, "Molly Downer". The paeonia mlokose-witschii, a yellow peony flower from Caucasus is commonly known as "Molly the Witch". Martin Page suggests that it may have been named after the story of Molly was published in 1844, in the book of ballads. A local theatre group on the Isle of Wight performed an original musical based on the life of Molly Downer at the 2023 Ventnor Fringe.
