= Marmotinto =

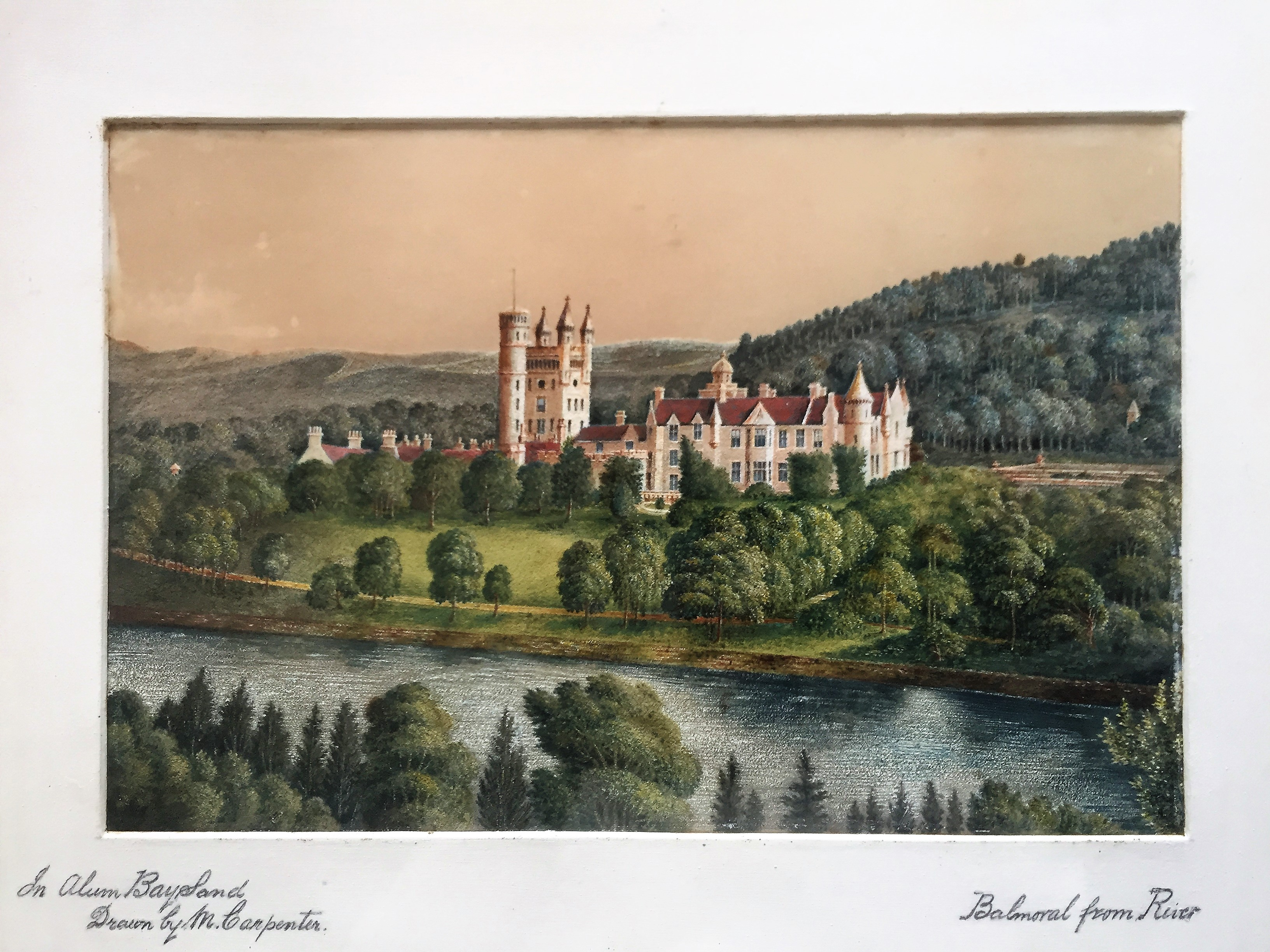
Balmoral in Alum Bay Sand, by M Carpenter

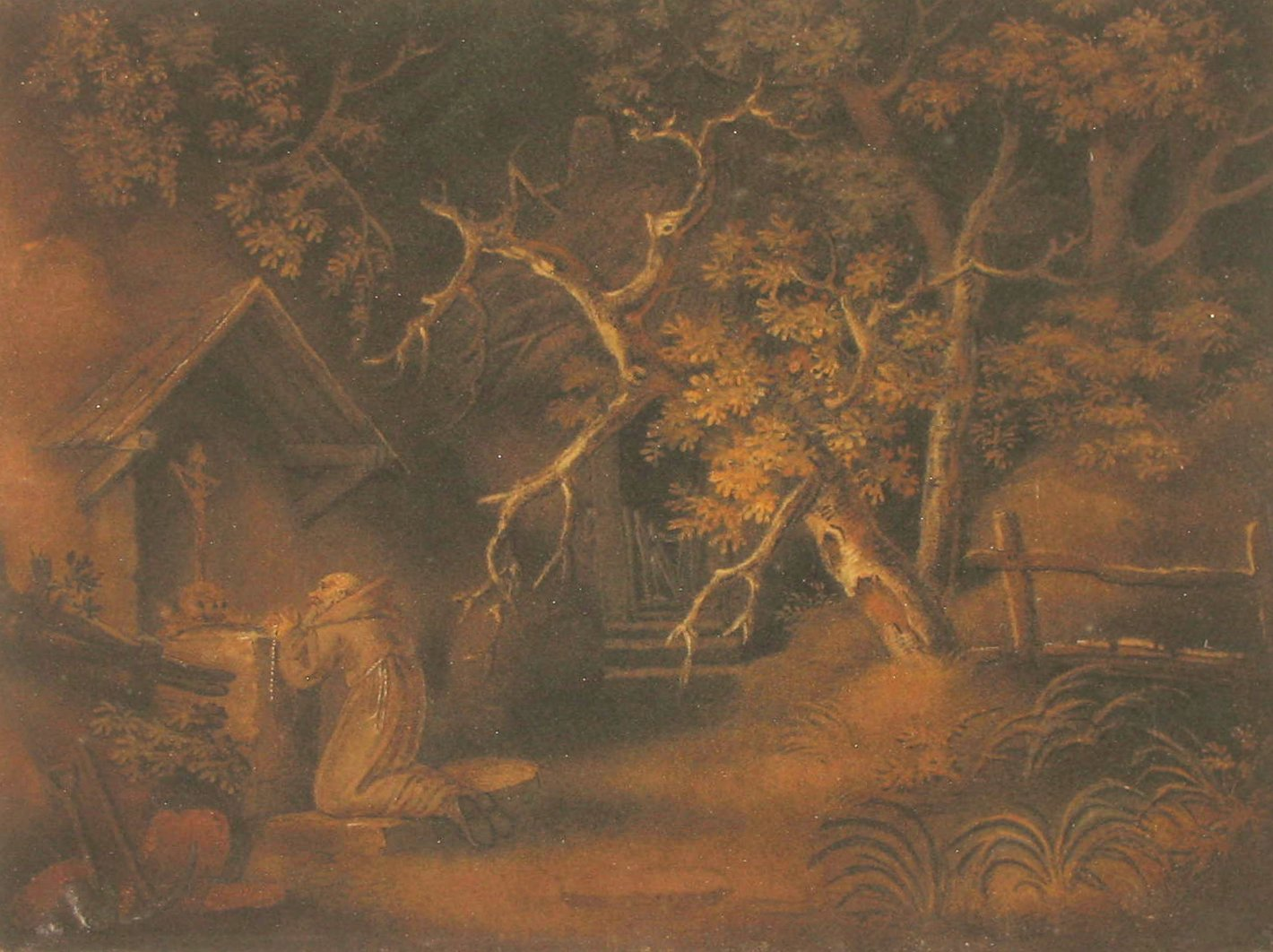
Georgian sand painting by Benjamin Zobel, c. 1800

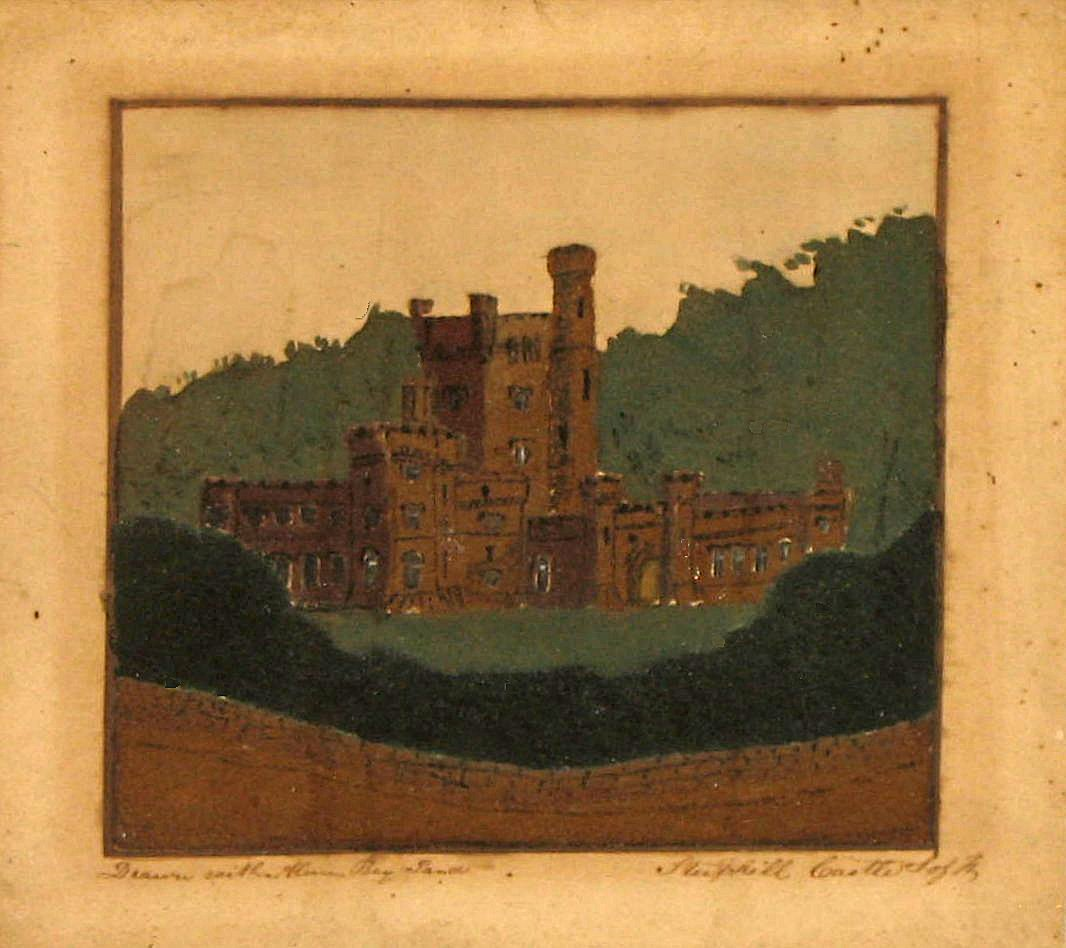
Victorian sand picture of Steephill Castle by Edwin Dore

Marmotinto is the art of creating pictures using coloured sand or marble dust and otherwise known as sand painting.

Originating in Europe, and probably based on the Japanese craft of bonseki (aka 'tray-painting'), marmotinto was fleetingly popular in England following a 1783 dinner party given by George III at Windsor Castle who was taken with a display of unfixed coloured sands, sugars and marble dust arranged under glass upon the surface of the dinner table in decorative patterns and including fruit and flowers, and exotic birds which was executed by the Bavarian table-decker Benjamin Zobel (Memmingen, 21 September 1762 - London, 24 October 1830), a friend of George Morland, a painter prominent in the "Isle of Wight School". The King and his courtiers was so impressed with the resulting picture, it was suggested that Zobel find a way to make his compositions permanent and hence the craft of marmotinto or sandpainting was born and proved most successful under the patronage of various members of the royal household including the then Duke of York.

Woburn Abbey in Bedford, England possesses a fine example of the table deckers' craft in the form of an ornate folding room screen with three panels, decorated with sand pictures protected by glass. The centre one has five spaces for sweetmeat pyramid dishes while the two side leaves of the screen have three spaces for fruit trays. There are four sand pictures in each corner of the side panels of the screen, featuring 18th-century pastoral scenes, while the remaining areas of the screen are decorated with butterflies, doves, fruit, flowers, etc. The screen would be laid upon the surface of a side table where it doubled as a serving base for elaborate porcelain dishes and glass trays containing fruits, bonbons and sweetmeats, from which the hosts and their guests could help themselves while socializing or stretching their legs between the multiple courses being served on the main table in the dining hall. This screen is believed to be the work of F. Schweikhardt, Zobel's predecessor at Windsor who specialised in still-life studies in the style of the Dutch painter Jan van Huysum.

Later the craft became popular in the early 19th century as the tourist industry began to develop on the Isle of Wight particularly at Alum Bay where coloured sands were readily available to the visitors should they wish to try their hand at creating their own souvenirs when they disembarked directly onto the beach from the decks of mainland steamers. The locals soon realised an opportunity to develop and market small framed sand pictures and also compressed sand patterns inside glass jars to supplement their meagre income. There are some examples of Alum Bay sand pictures at Osborne House and Carisbrook Castle while at the Victoria and Albert Museum, the late Queen Mary's collection of Georgian sandpaintings may be viewed by request.

Although marmotinto using coloured sands and marble dust was popular across England and on the continent for a while, it declined after an initial fashionable period. The art saw a comeback in the 20th century using natural coloured sands, supplemented by discarded, recycled and found materials.
