= Scratchell's Bay =

Bay on coast of Isle of Wight, England

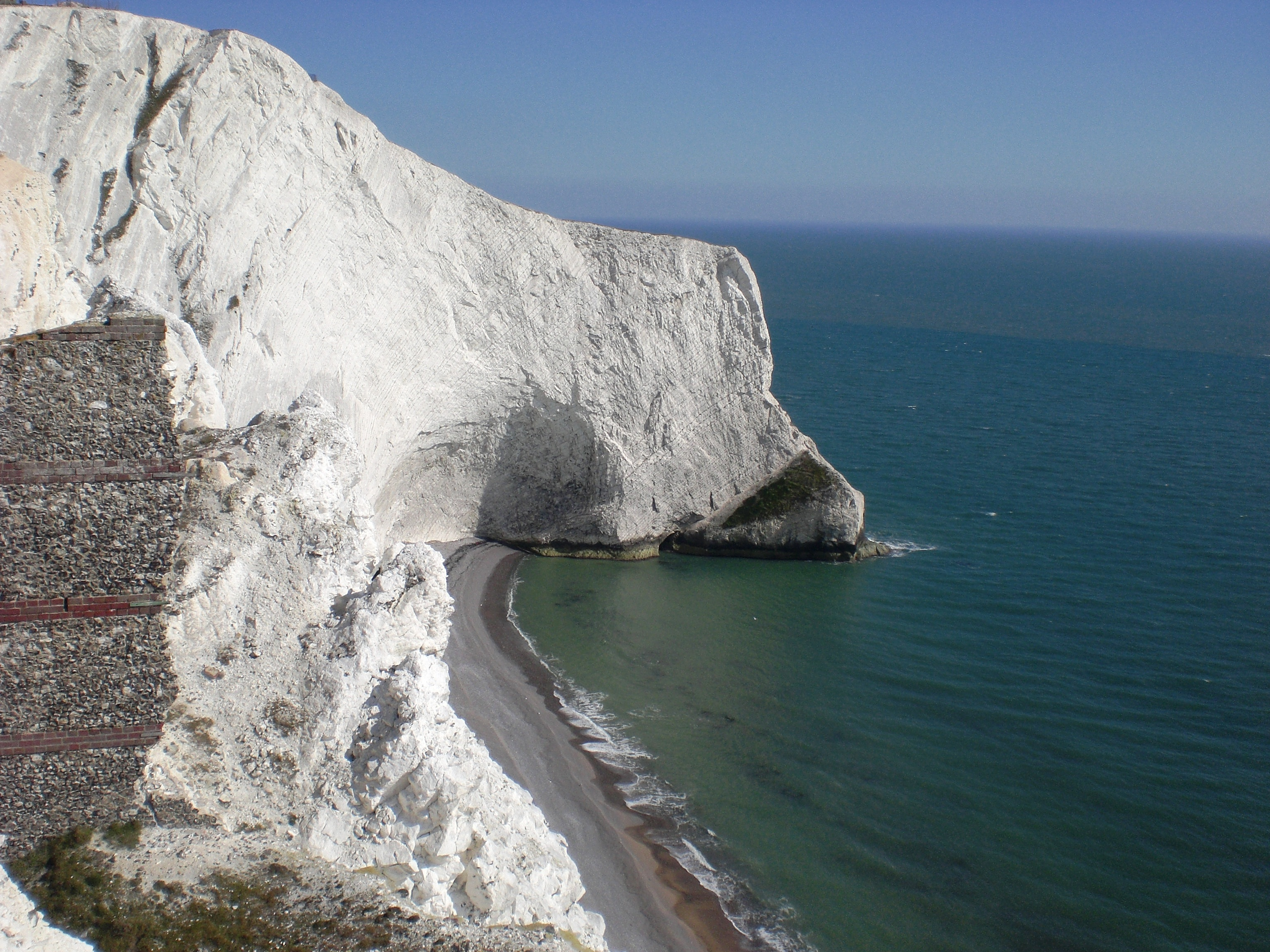
- View of Scratchell's Bay looking East

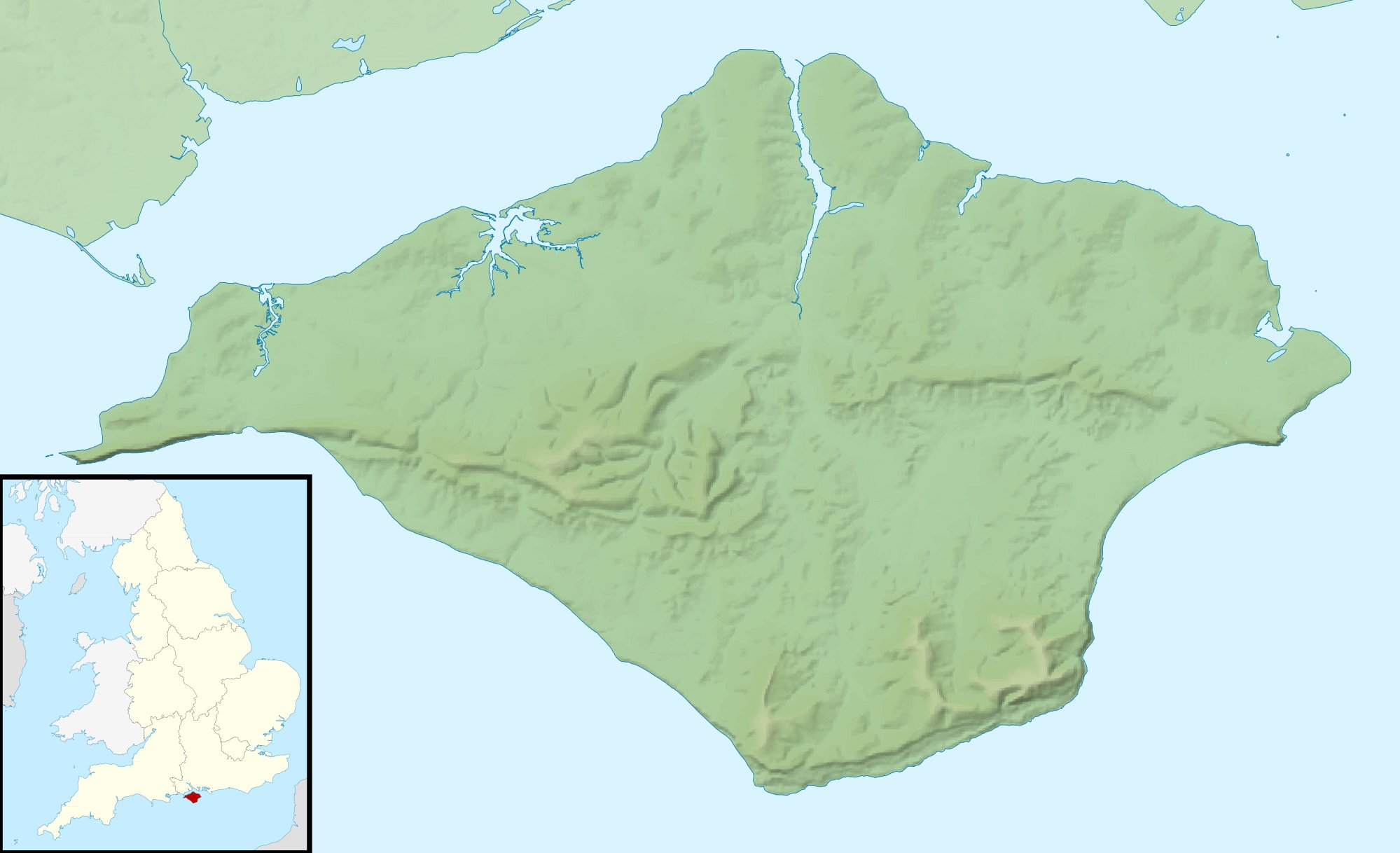
- Location within Isle of Wight
- Coordinates: 50.6616°N 1.5835°W
- Ocean/sea sources: English Channel

Scratchell's Bay is a bay on the south west coast of the Isle of Wight, England just to the south east of The Needles. It faces roughly south towards the English Channel, it is 250m in length and is straight. The name is thought to have come from one of the many names for the Devil. The bay itself is shallow, and the 2m contour is approximately 200m from the cliff face.

The beach is made up mostly of shingle and can only, reasonably, be reached by boat. There is no path from the top of the cliff. A small cave is located just into the sea at the east end of the bay near Sun Corner. Approximately 150m west of the Easterly promontory is the large St.Anthony's Rock; It is a-wash at low tide (dries to 0.6m on spring low) and is a significant hazard to boats.

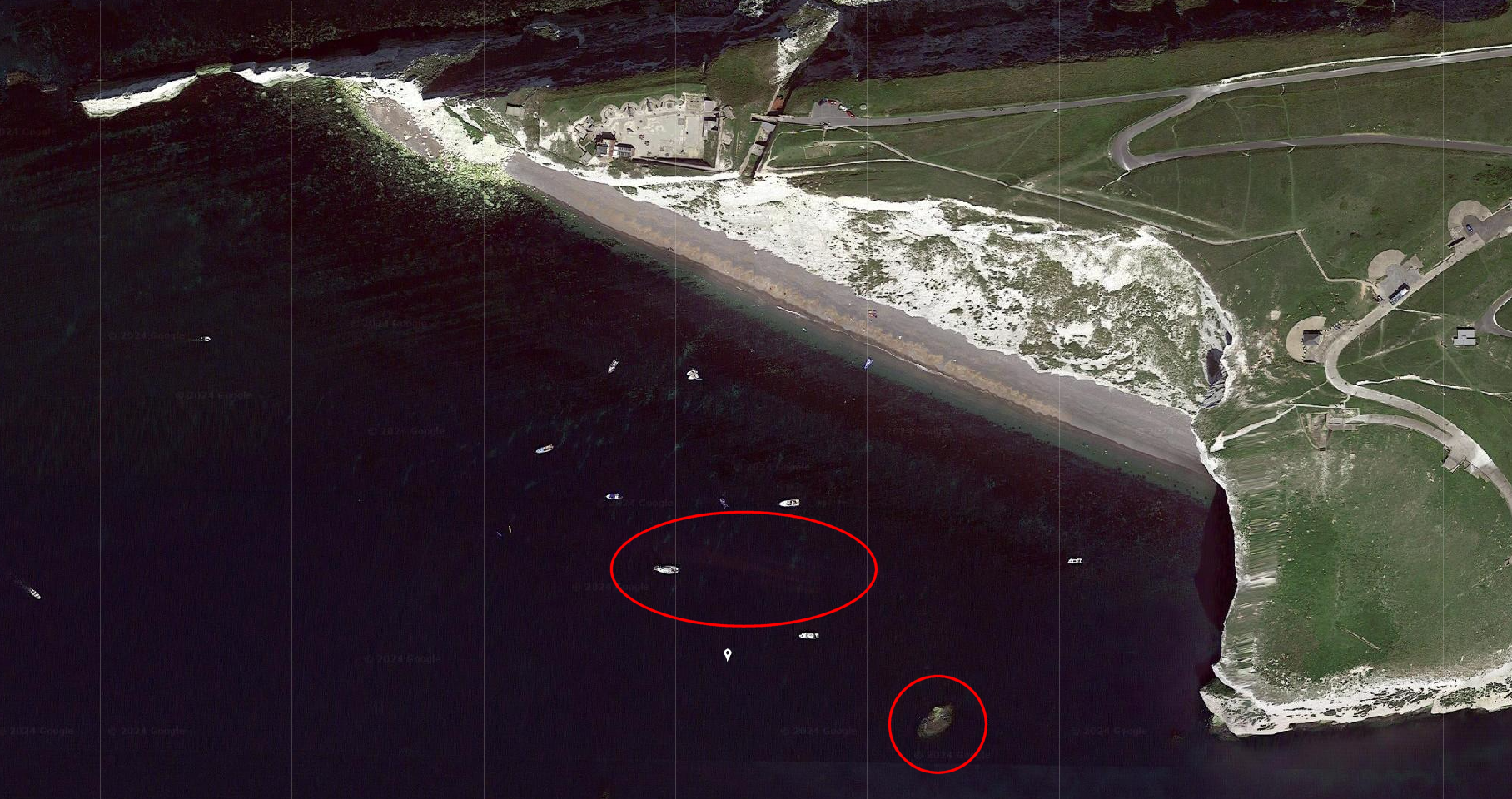
Satellite view of Scratchell's Bay with St.Anthony's Rock cirled and the wreck of Irex clearly visible

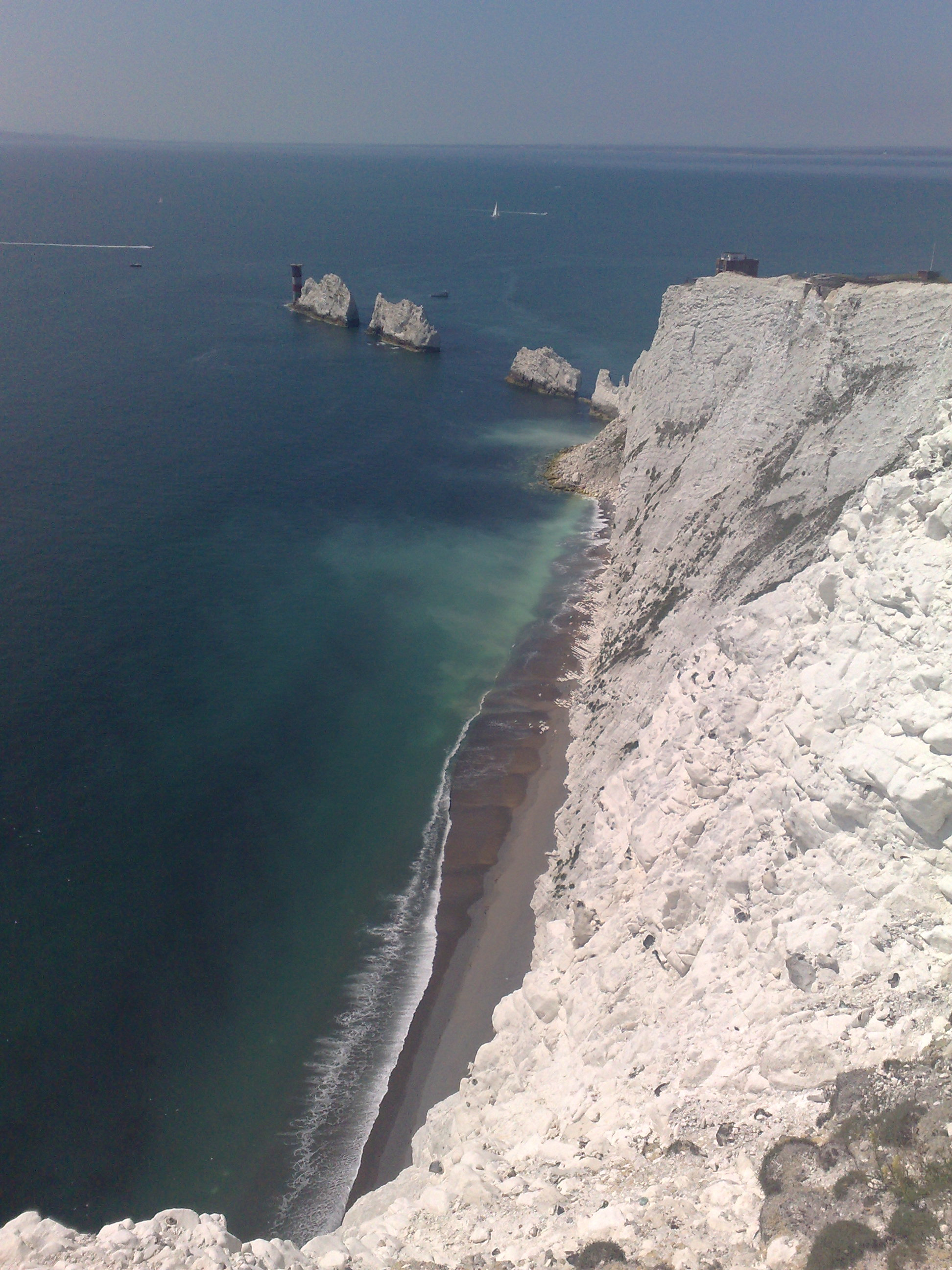
View of the bay looking west from the experimental rocket launching station

The bay is best viewed from either the lookout point near the rocket launching facility or the Needles Old Battery National Trust property on the cliff top.

During a storm of 24 January 1890, the iron-clad Irex on her way to Rio de Janeiro with a load of iron pipes, had turned back from Biscay to seek shelter. Due to a navigation error, she was wrecked and sank in the bay with the loss of six lives, The wreck still lies within the bay and a large portion of the floor of the bay is scattered with the remains of the ship and its cargo presenting multiple fouling hazards. The hull of the ship is largely intact and lies roughly 15 degrees from parallel to the beach, rising rapidly from 5m or so and awash on spring lows, thus she presents a significant danger to keeled craft and larger leisure boats. For vessels entering the bay, it is vital to locate both the wreck and St.Anthony's rock.
