= The Needles =

Row of sea stacks, England

Coordinates: 50°39′46″N 1°35′22″W

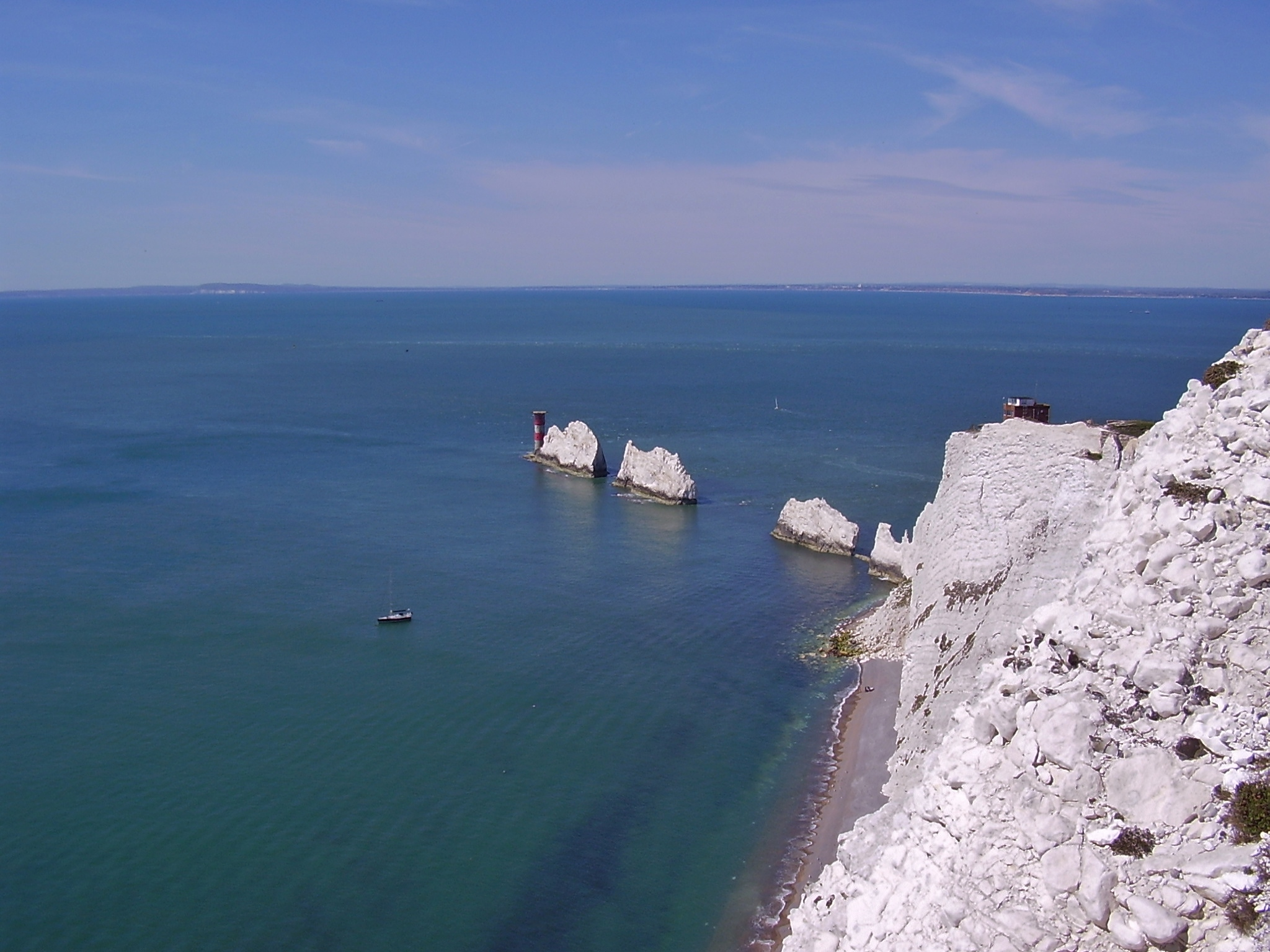
The Needles – View from the viewpoint near the former experimental rocket testing station

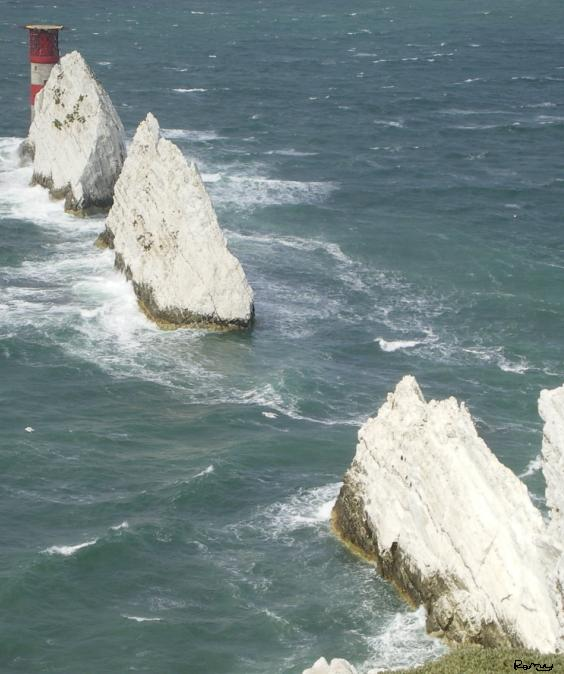
The Needles from the cliffs inshore at The Needles Battery showing the Needles Lighthouse

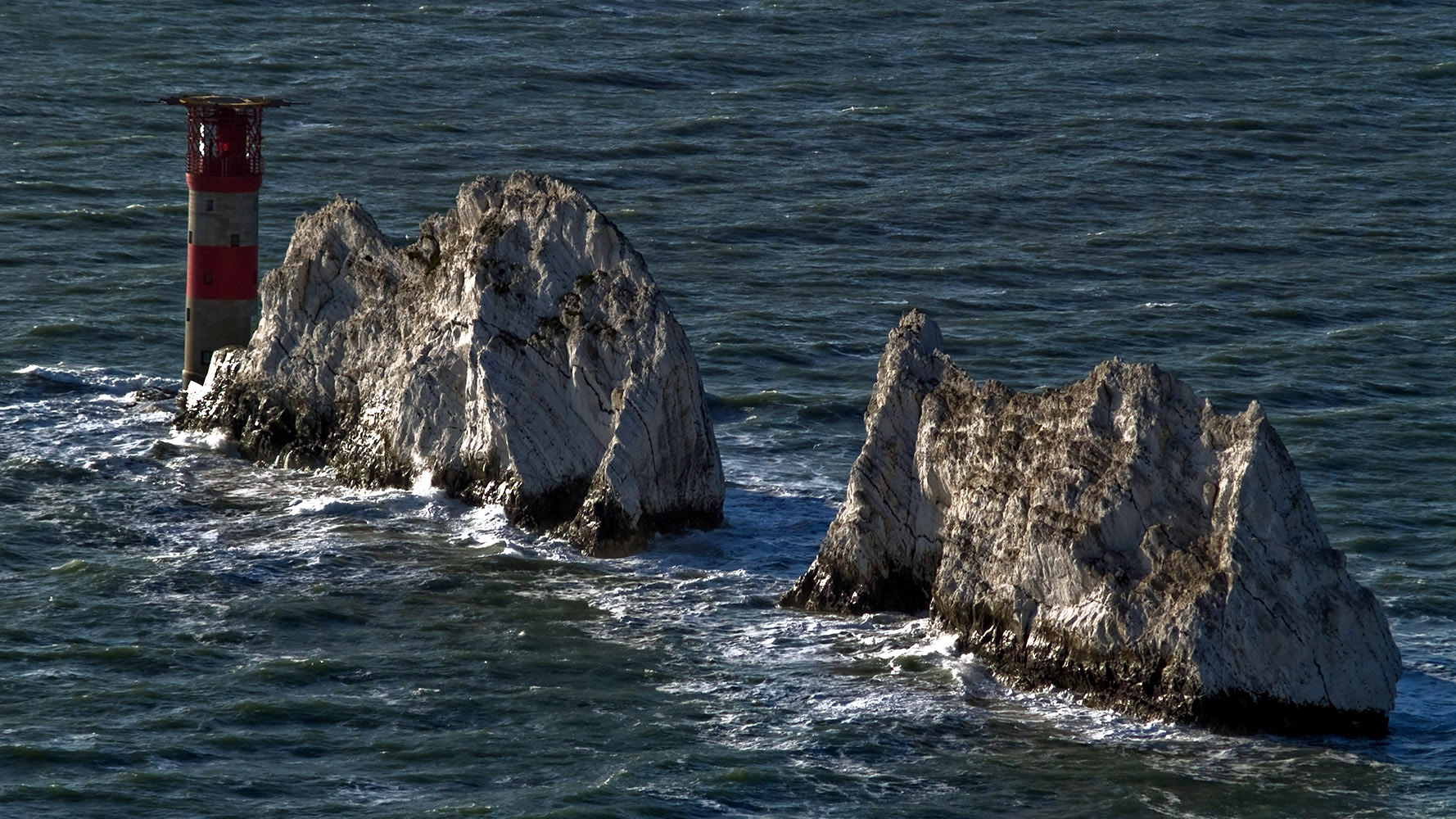
Close-up of the needles

The Needles are a row of three stacks of chalk that rise about 30 metres (98 ft) out of the sea off the western extremity of the Isle of Wight in the English Channel, United Kingdom, close to Alum Bay and Scratchell's Bay, and part of Totland, the westernmost civil parish of the Isle of Wight. The Needles Lighthouse stands at the outer, western end of the formation. Built in 1859, it has been automated since 1994. The waters and adjoining seabed form part of the Needles Marine Conservation Zone and the Needles along with the shore and heath above are part of the Headon Warren and West High Down Site of Special Scientific Interest.

== Name ==
The name is from Old English nǣdl, referring to the needle-like shape of Lot's Wife, a chalk stack ~120 feet (37 m) that collapsed in 1764. The remaining rocks are not at all needle-like, but the name has stuck.

1333: Nedlen

1409: les Nedeles

1583: The Nedles

1600: The Nedells

The 14th century spelling used the old dialectal plural form -en.

== History ==
The Needles were featured on the BBC Two TV programme Seven Natural Wonders (2005) as one of the wonders of Southern England.

During Storm Eunice on 18 February 2022, the highest recorded wind gust in England was provisionally recorded at The Needles, at 122 miles per hour (196 km/h).

LB&SCR H2 class 4-4-2 no. 423 (later no. B423 and 2423) was named The Needles after this landmark.

== Tourism ==
The Needles lie just to the southwest of Alum Bay, and are a tourist draw. Scenic boat trips operate from Alum Bay that offer close-up views of the Needles and the lighthouse. They have become icons of the Isle of Wight, often photographed by visitors, and are featured on many of the souvenirs sold throughout the island.

The main tourist attractions of the headland itself are the two gun batteries, the experimental rocket testing station, and the four coastguard cottages owned by the National Trust. A branch of the National Coastwatch Institution is also based at the Needles, sited near the New Battery and Rocket Testing Site on High Down. The Needles – Landmark Attraction (previously known as The Needles Pleasure Park) situated at the top of the cliff at Alum Bay is a small amusement park. A chairlift operates between the park and the beach.

== Military use ==
The Needles were a site of a long-standing artillery battery, from the 1860s to 1954, which was eventually decommissioned.

A nearby site on High Down was employed in the testing of rockets for the British ICBM programme. The headland at High Down was used for Black Knight and Black Arrow rocket engine tests from 1956 to 1971. During the peak of activity in the early 1960s some 240 people worked at the complex, while the rockets were built in nearby East Cowes. These rockets were later used to launch the Prospero X-3 satellite. The site is now owned by the National Trust, and is open to the public. Concrete installations remain, but the buildings that were less durable have either been demolished or were torn down by the elements.

In 1982, Prince Charles officially opened the restored Needles Old Battery facility. Underground rocket testing rooms are currently being restored for exhibition. The first phase of restoration was completed in 2004.

=== Access ===
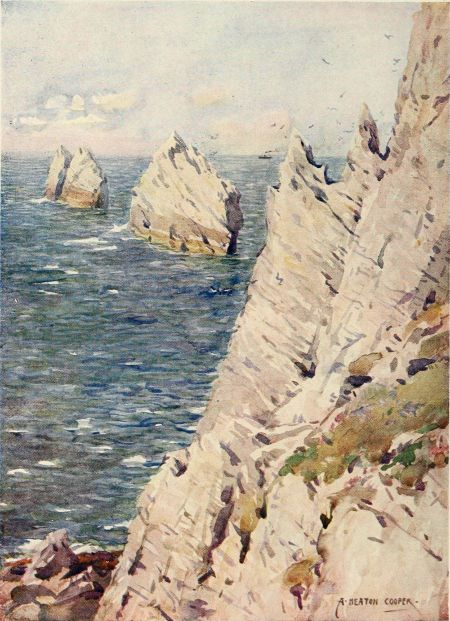
The Needles – From the Beautiful Britain series, The Isle of Wight, by G. E. Mitton

The batteries are accessible by car, foot, bicycle, and bus. Though there is a paved road up to The Old and The New batteries, access is on foot, from a car park. The battery site becomes dangerous in high winds and is closed to the public in winds above force 8.

In the spring and summer, the Southern Vectis bus company sends open-top buses along a route called The Needles Breezer. This route approaches the Battery along the cliff edge, using a road reserved for bus traffic. The Needles Breezer also has stops in Alum Bay, Totland, Colwell Bay, Fort Victoria, Yarmouth, and Freshwater Bay. Breezer buses are the only vehicles allowed on the road from Alum Bay, apart from those owned by National Trust staff or, by prior appointment, vehicles transporting disabled visitors. This is because the single track road's position close to the cliff edge is considered dangerous for multiple car use.

The Isle of Wight Coast Path has its westernmost point at the Coastguard Cottages.

== Geology ==
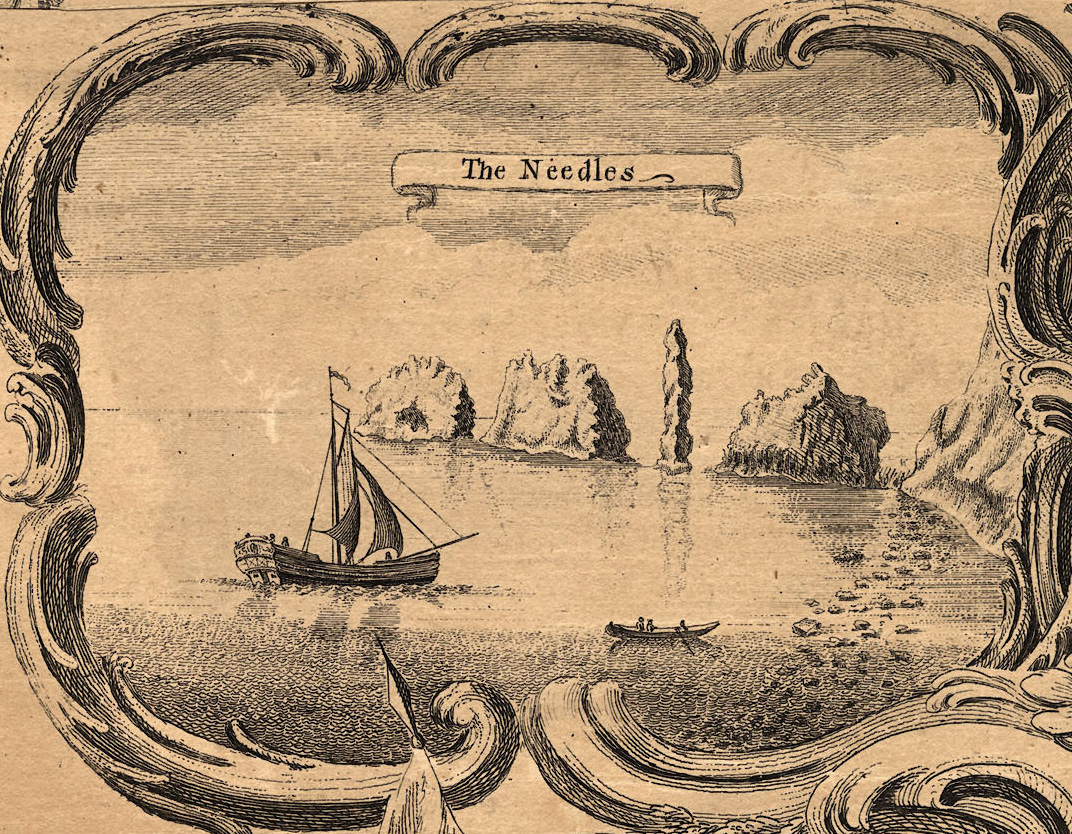
The Needles from Isaac Taylor's "one inch map" of Hampshire, published in 1759, showing Lot's Wife, the needle-shaped pillar that collapsed in a storm in 1764

The Needles' pointed shape is a result of their unusual geology. The strata have been so heavily folded during the Alpine Orogeny that the chalk is near vertical. This chalk outcrop runs through the centre of the Island from Culver Cliff in the east to the Needles in the west, and then continues under the sea to the Isle of Purbeck, forming Ballard Cliff (near Swanage), Lulworth Cove and Durdle Door. At Old Harry Rocks (east of Studland and north of Swanage) these strata lines moving from horizontal to near vertical can be seen from the sea.

The shape of the lost Lot's Wife stone column, recorded as collapsing in 1764, is subject to some speculation. A drawing of The Needles by Dutch landscape artist Lambert Doomer (1624–1700), made in 1646, depicts a rock formation with much stouter shape than that shown in Isaac Taylor's 1759 "one inch" map of Hampshire. The Doomer etching is contained in Atlas Blaeu-Van der Hem (published ca. 1662), which is in the Austrian National Library in Vienna. It is not clear from these drawings what transpired and whether Doomer was exercising artistic license. Doomer's painting shows three stacks when there should have been four, prior to the collapse of Lot's Wife.

Just off the end of The Needles formation is the Shingles, a shifting shoal of pebbles just beneath the waves. The Shingles is approximately three miles in length. Many ships have been wrecked on the Shingles and three notable vessels on The Needles themselves: HMS Assurance in the 18th century, HMS Pomone in the 19th, and SS Varvassi in 1947.

== See also ==
- Palmerston Forts
- Palmerston Forts, Isle of Wight
