= Alum Bay =

Bay in the Isle of Wight

Coordinates: 50°39′59″N 1°34′34″W

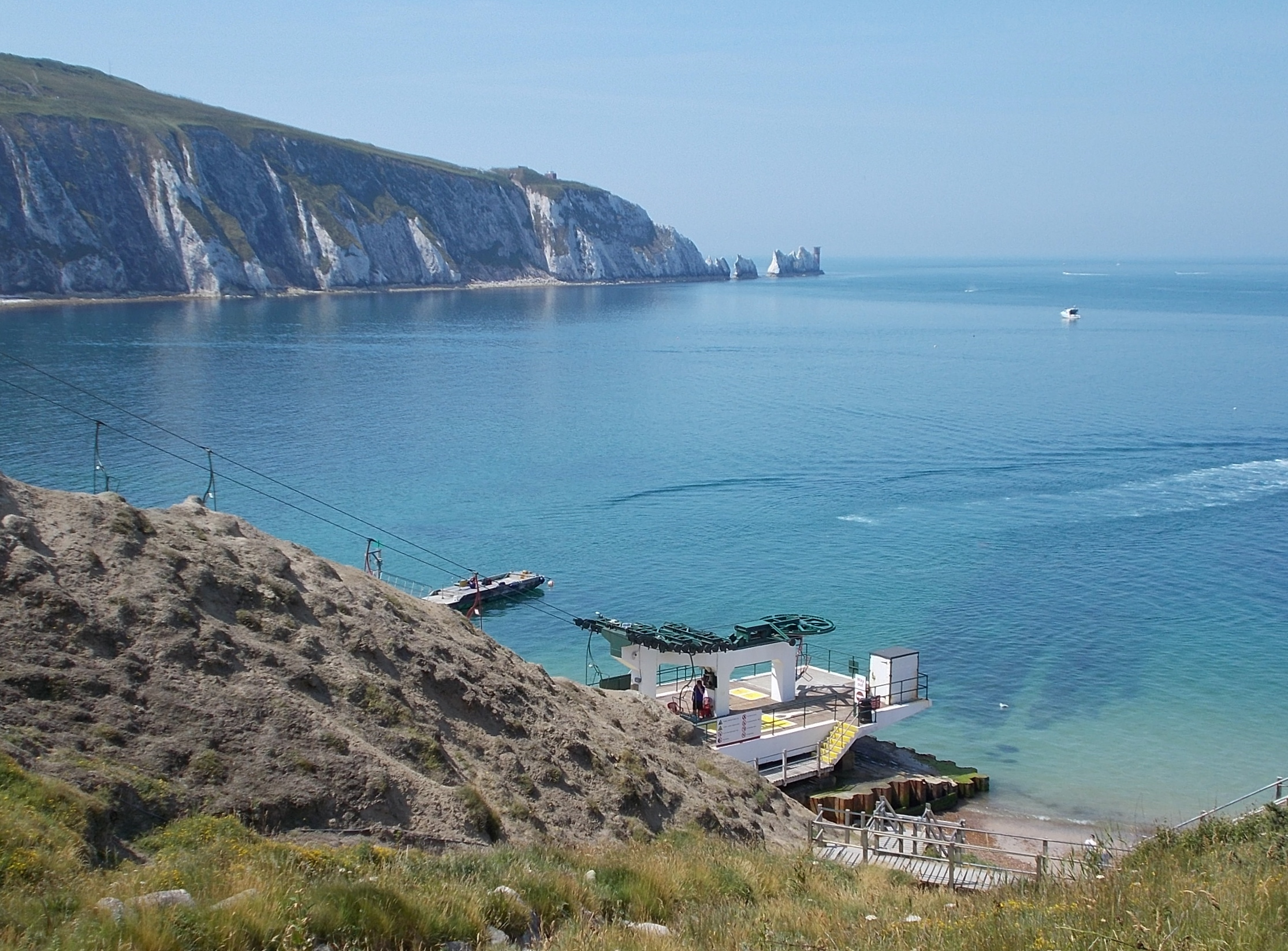
A view of the Needles from Alum Bay cliffs, with the Alum Bay chair lift in the foreground.

Alum Bay is a bay near the westernmost point of the Isle of Wight, England, within close sight of the Needles rock formation. Of geological interest and a tourist attraction, the bay is noted for its multi-coloured sand cliffs. The waters and adjoining seabed form part of the Needles Marine Conservation Zone and the shore and heath above are part of the Headon Warren and West High Down Site of Special Scientific Interest.

== Geology ==
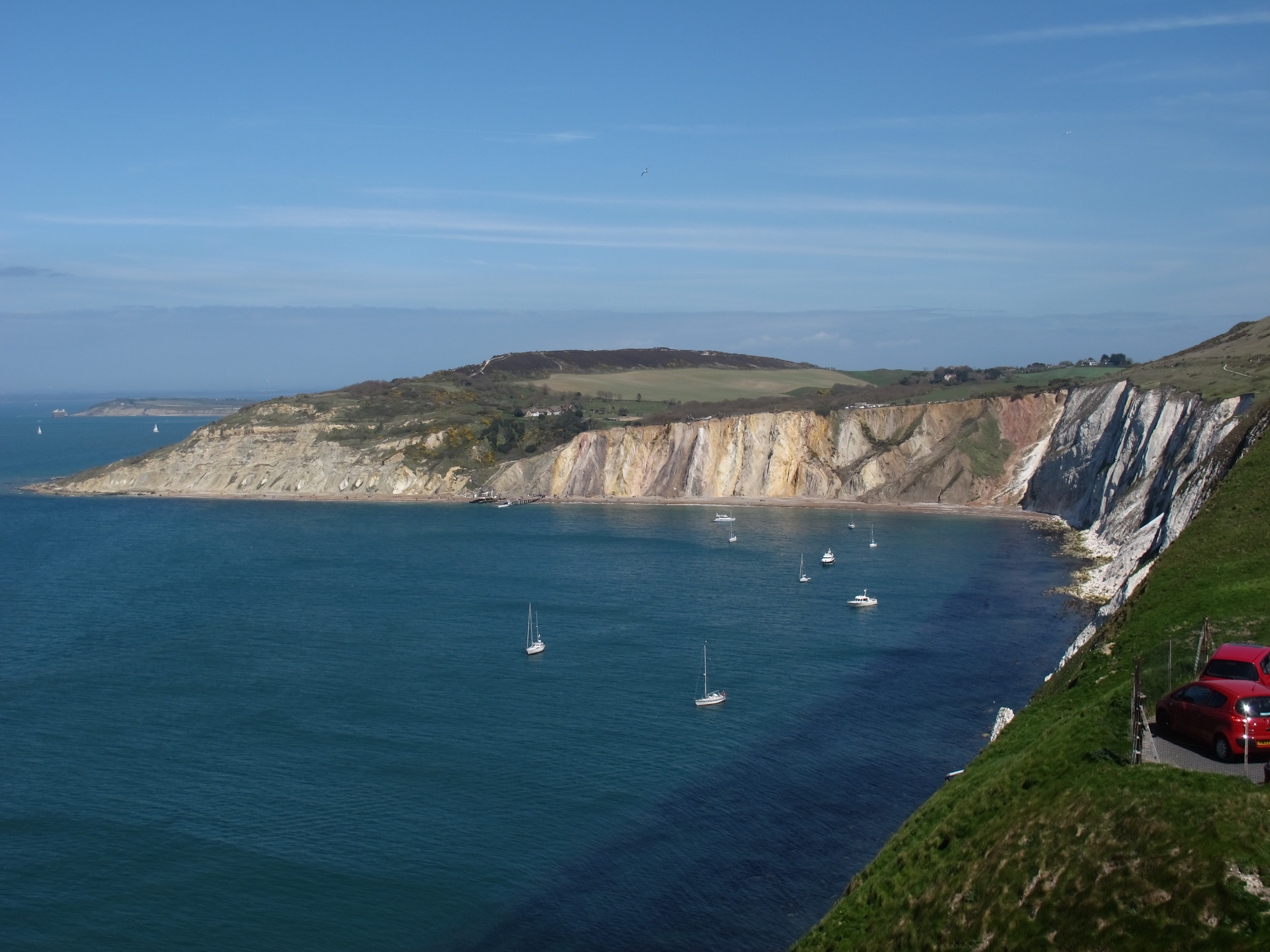
The cliffs of Alum Bay, showing the steeply-dipping multi-coloured sands above the white Chalk, with shallower dips towards the northern end

Alum Bay is the location of a classic sequence of upper Paleocene and Eocene beds of soft sands and clays, separated by an unconformity from the underlying Cretaceous Chalk Formation that forms the adjoining headland of West High Down. Due to geological folding of the Alpine orogeny, the strata in the main section of the bay are near vertical, with younger rocks with progressively lower dips to the west. The sands are coloured due to oxidised iron compounds formed under different conditions.

Alum Bay Chine begins as a small wooded valley descending eastward from the junction of the B3322 and the road to Headon Hall. It soon broadens into the clay ravine through which the path and chairlift from Needles Park descend to the beach.

It was named from large amounts of alum mined here in the 16th century.

== Tourism ==
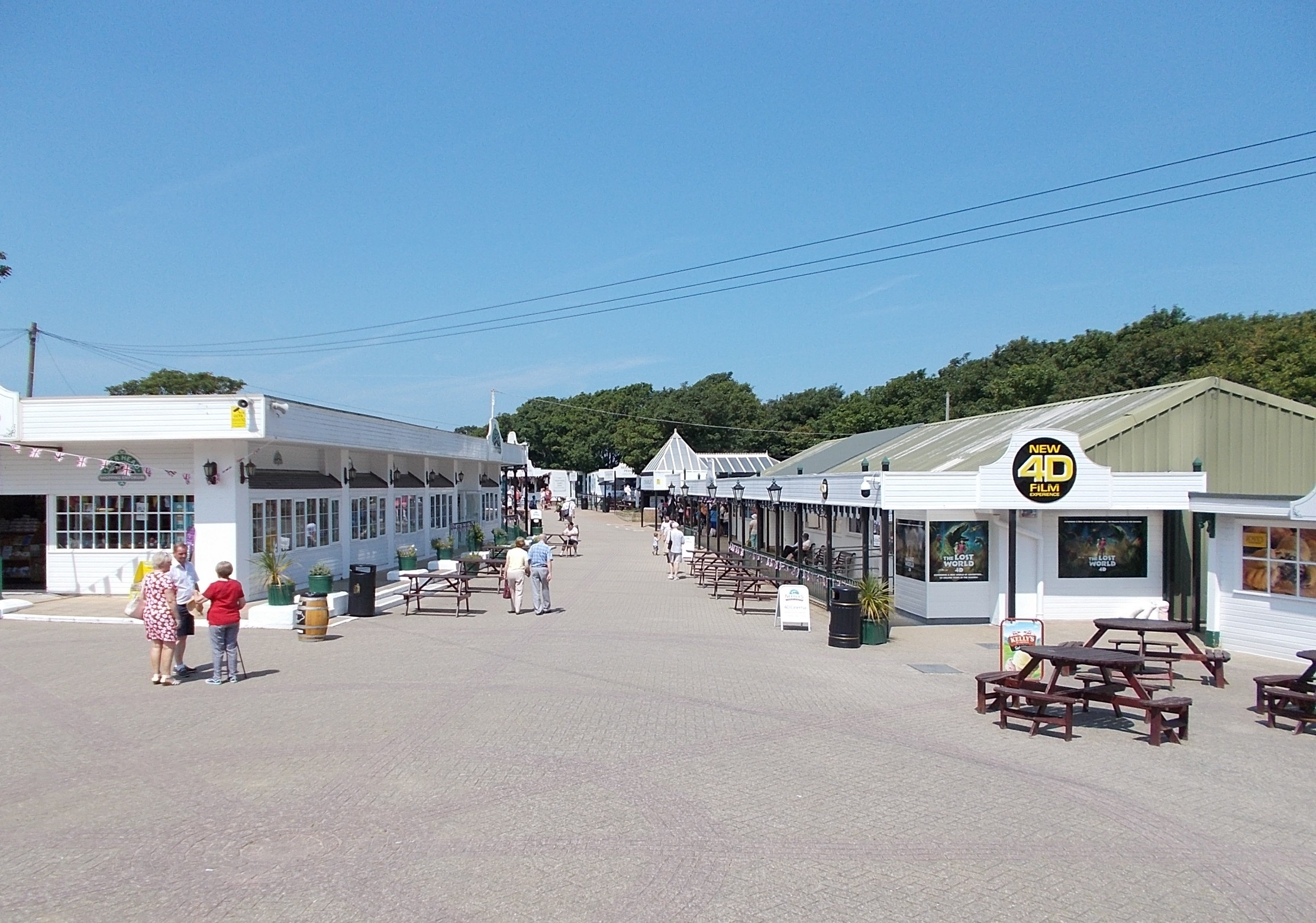
The amusement park at Alum Bay

On the clifftop there is an amusement park with fairground rides, souvenir shops and a cafe. During the summer season a chair lift takes tourists to and from the pebble beach below. Alternatively, a footpath leads to the beach via Alum Bay Chine. From the beach boat trips frequently leave to tour the Needles.

== Alum Bay sands ==
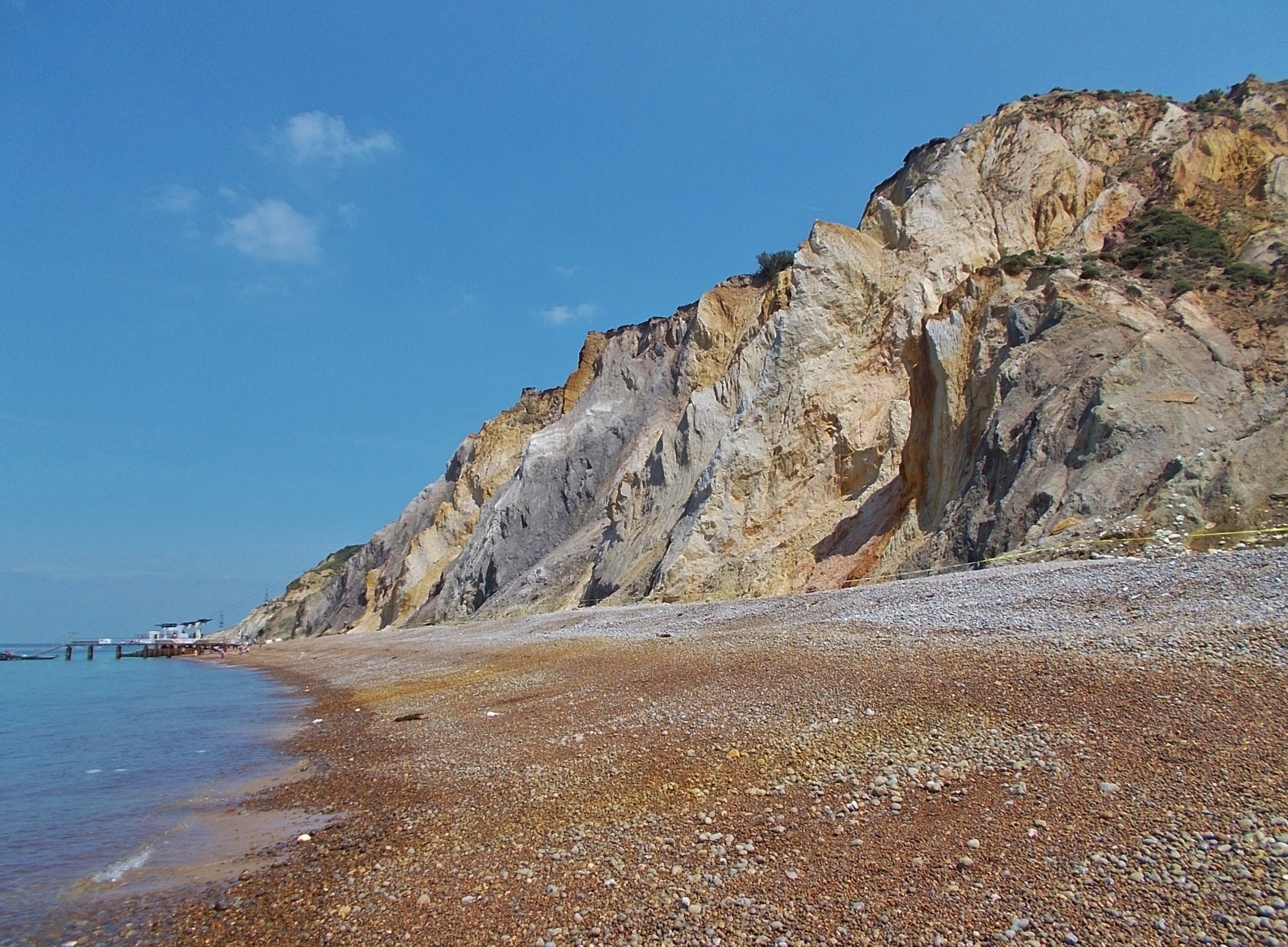
The coloured sands at Alum Bay

A traditional product of Alum Bay, and a fixture of Isle of Wight tourist shops, was the creation of ornaments using the coloured sands layered in vials and jars. The sands were also used for sand painting pictures, a popular craft in Victorian times known as marmotinto.

In the past, visitors to the bay could climb the foot of the cliffs and dig out the sand themselves. The removal of minerals from the site is now prohibited by law under provisions laid out in notices attached to the Headon Warren and West High Down SSSI designation.

The Needles Park has a facility where people could make bottles of sand, using sand gathered from the frequent rockfalls. In the past it was possible to buy Alum Bay coloured sand by mail order and make one's own sand pictures and bottles at home.

== Transport ==
Southern Vectis run bus services from Alum Bay, including two summer-only open top services – the Needles Breezer and the Island Coaster.

== History ==
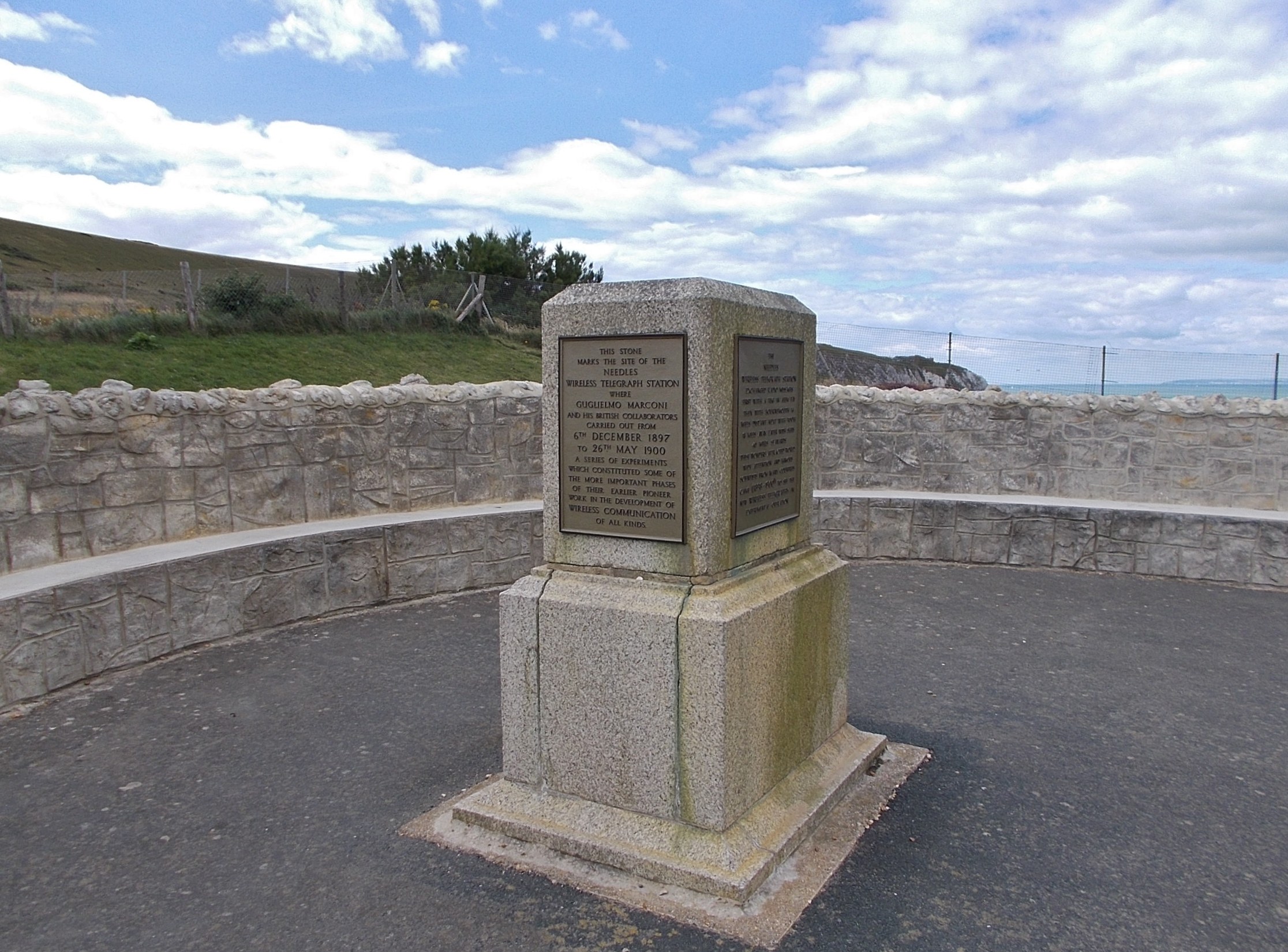
Monument to Guglielmo Marconi

On a map of the area produced around 1590, the bay is named Whytfylde Chine. It is possible that Alum Bay was once fed by a Chine by this name, which has long since eroded away.

Alum Bay sand includes extremely pure white silica, which was once extracted for glass and pottery manufacture.

Guglielmo Marconi moved to Alum Bay in 1897 to experiment with radio. He installed a 40-metre radio antenna outside the Needles Hotel in Alum Bay. Initially establishing communication with ships offshore, by early 1898 he had successfully communicated with stations at Madeira House, Bournemouth and the Haven Hotel, Poole 20 miles away.

== See also ==
- Whitecliff Bay
