= Namgyal =

Namgyal, a Tibetan deity, has been a personal name in several countries; see (inter alia):

== Literature ==
- Dagpo Tashi Namgyal, a 16th-century Tibetan Buddhist scholar of the Dagpo Kagyu lineage

== Politics ==
- Namgyal dynasty (disambiguation)
  - Namgyal dynasty of Sikkim, rulers in Sikkim
  - Namgyal dynasty of Ladakh, rulers in Ladakh
- Phuntsog Namgyal (disambiguation)
  - Phuntsog Namgyal, first king of Sikkim
- Palden Thondup Namgyal, last hereditary ruler of Sikkim, husband of Hope Cooke
- Ngawang Namgyal, founder of Bhutan
- Tashi Namgyal, ruler of Sikkim from 1914 to 1963
- Thutob Namgyal, who transferred Sikkim's capital to Gangtok in 1894
- Tshudpud Namgyal, longest-reigning king of Sikkim (from 1793 to 1863); regained independence from Nepal in 1815

== Culture ==
- Namgyal Institute of Tibetology
- Namgyal Monastery, any of several Tibetan Buddhist institutions
- Namgyal Monastery Institute of Buddhist Studies
- Namgyal Lhamo, exponent of Tibetan singing
- Tashi Namgyal Academy in Sikkim

== Sports ==
- Namgyal Bhutia, Indian professional footballer

== Other ==
- Namgyal Rinpoche, Karma Tenzin Dorje (1931-2003), born Leslie George Dawson, in Toronto, Canada

== See also ==
- Chogyal, the ruler of the Namgyal dynasty of Sikkim
- Gyalpo (disambiguation), the ruler of the Namgyal dynasty of Ladakh
