= Buddhoṣṇīṣa =

Buddhoṣṇīṣa (Sanskrit: बुद्धोष्णीष; Chinese: 佛頂尊, fódǐngzūn; Japanese: 仏頂尊, butchōson), also known as Uṣṇīṣarāja or simply Uṣṇīṣa, is a type of Buddha worshipped particularly in Esoteric Buddhism. The term is sometimes translated into English as Buddha Crown.

This deity represents the uṣṇīṣa—the cranial protuberance found on the crown of a Buddha’s head—deified as an independent Buddha, as well as a mantra possessing the same supernatural power, which is also deified.

== Overview ==
A Tathāgata, as one who has realized ultimate truth, possesses various physical characteristics. Among these, the crown of the head is believed to hold mystical power. It is also interpreted as a deification of the Buddha’s superior intellect and the wisdom that brings salvation to all beings.

Another notable feature of the buddhoṣṇīṣa is its association with mantra practice. By chanting dhāraṇī or seed syllables (Sanskrit: bīja) dedicated to a certain buddhoṣṇīṣa, it is believed that one can save the souls of the deceased, ward off various disasters, and subdue evil spirits.

This belief is largely rooted in the narratives found in the scriptures that expound on buddhoṣṇīṣas, which generally follow the themes described above. An example may be found in the Uṣṇīṣa Vijayā Dhāraṇī:

One day, a certain deva named Supratiṣṭhita received a revelation that his death was imminent, and that after dying he would be reborn into hell and suffer greatly. In desperation, he sought help from Śakra, the king of the gods, but even Śakra was powerless to save him. Eventually, the deva turned to Śākyamuni Buddha for salvation.

The Buddha then emitted a radiant light from the crown of his head, and with this supernatural power, he saved the deva. Afterward, the Buddha taught a mantra, explaining that after his own parinirvāṇa, beings who experience similar suffering can be saved by reciting this mantra.

In other words, after the Buddha’s passing, this mantra came to be directly identified with the Buddha’s uṣṇīṣa and was deified as such. The various mantras of buddhoṣṇīṣas are believed to be especially efficacious in breaking the cycle of rebirth into evil destinies—that is, in saving the departed from realms of suffering—and are therefore often recited during funeral rites.

Generally, buddhoṣṇīṣa are depicted in forms similar to those of bodhisattvas, adorned with ornate jewelry and accessories. They are also said to resemble a Wheel-Turning Sacred King. However, unlike ordinary bodhisattvas, buddhoṣṇīṣas are typically characterized by a “double topknot” (重髻, jūkei)—a unique hairstyle in which the hair is tied into an additional knot above the uṣṇīṣa. This distinctive feature is seen in forms such as Uṣṇīṣavijayā (尊勝仏頂, zonshō butchō) and Sitātapatrā (白傘蓋仏頂, byakusangai butchō).

However, there are exceptions—for instance, Ekākṣaroṣṇīṣacakra (一字金輪仏頂, ichiji kinrin butchō) and Tejaprabhā (熾盛光仏頂, shijōkō butchō)—which are portrayed in the form of a Tathāgata rather than a bodhisattva.

== See also ==
- Ekākṣaroṣṇīṣacakra
- Sitatapatra
- Ushnisha
- Ushnishasitatapattra
- Uṣṇīṣa Vijaya Dhāraṇī
