= Chenrezig Tibetan Buddhist Center of Philadelphia =

Buddhist temple in Philadelphia, Pennsylvania, US

Coordinates: 39°58′07.4″N 75°08′52.0″W

Chenrezig Tibetan Buddhist Center of Philadelphia (CTBC) is a Tibetan Buddhist community at 954 N. Marshall Street, Philadelphia, Pennsylvania. It was founded in 1989 by Lama Losang Samten, a Tibetan Buddhist monk and sand mandala master, along with a group of his students.

Lama Losang Samten previously served as the personal assistant to His Holiness the 14th Dalai Lama. In 1988, he was sent by the Dalai Lama to New York City to create one of the first Tibetan Buddhist sand mandalas in the Western Hemisphere. Significantly, the very first sand mandala to be created in the Western Hemisphere was the Kalachakra mandala in 1981 in Dunn, Wisconsin, the subject of the 2024 documentary, The Dalai Lama's Gift. Lama Losang Samten appears in this documentary, explaining that he came to the United States for the first time to create the Kalachakra mandala in Wisconsin, as part of the ritual ceremony that comprises the Kalachakra initiation, an empowerment for world peace. Seven years after creating the Kalachakra mandala in Wisconsin, Lama Losang then journeyed to New York, also to create a Kalachakra mandala.

While in New York, Lama Samten was invited to Philadelphia to construct a sand mandala at the University of Pennsylvania Museum of Archaeology and Anthropology. In 1989, he began teaching Tibetan Buddhism, as well as the Tibetan language and culture, at the museum. During this time, he commuted from New York City with a translator.

After two years, as Lama Samten prepared to return to his monastery in India, a group of his students petitioned the Dalai Lama through letters requesting that he appoint Lama Samten as a permanent teacher in Philadelphia. The Dalai Lama agreed, leading to the establishment of the Chenrezig Tibetan Buddhist Center.

== History ==
The Chenrezig Tibetan Buddhist Center of Philadelphia was established in 1989, with Lama Losang Samten as Spiritual Director. Initially, teachings were held on the campus of the University of Pennsylvania Museum. Eventually, Lama Losang’s students began searching for a permanent home for their sangha (Buddhist community).

Their first dedicated location was a rental on the second floor of a building on Lancaster Avenue in West Philadelphia. Members performed extensive renovations, and the sangha met there for several years. When the building owner required the space back, the sangha entered its first nomadic phase, returning to the University of Pennsylvania Women's Center.

In the early 2000s, an opportunity arose to purchase a house owned by a member in the suburb of Upper Darby. Although the purchase was completed, attendance declined due to limited public transportation access and the area’s difficulty to reach without a car.

A zoning dispute further complicated their use of the property, and it was sold in 2007. This led to another nomadic period. The sangha eventually found a semi-permanent home in a converted industrial building housing artists’ lofts at 9th and Spring Garden Streets, where they remained for about six years. After a fire in another unit caused the building to be condemned, the sangha began a third nomadic phase and decided to once again pursue a permanent home.

In 2017, a modest brick building was purchased at 954 N. Marshall Street, on the edge of the Northern Liberties neighborhood. This once-bustling market corridor historically included many Jewish-owned businesses that thrived during the 19th and early 20th centuries. The building had previously housed a women’s clothing store, a chicken processing facility, and, according to local residents, a gambling operation.

When the center officially opened in 2017, Lama Losang’s long-held vision of a place dedicated to the study and cultivation loving-kindness and compassion was realized. The Chenrezig Tibetan Buddhist Center of Philadelphia was named and blessed by His Holiness the Dalai Lama.

== Lama Losang’s Approach to Teaching ==
Lama Losang Samten entered Namgyal Monastery in Dharamshala, India as a young boy after fleeing Tibet with his family and settling in Nepal for several years. At the monastery, he received firsthand teachings from His Holiness the 14th Dalai Lama and other great Buddhist thinkers, and he retains a deep love of learning to this day.

Lama Losang is a recognized expert in Tibetan ritual dance and a master of sand mandala creation, having created several hundred mandalas across North America and South America in the last 35 years.

He long dreamed of establishing a center where people would feel comfortable and welcome to learn about Buddhism. His teaching style often includes references and metaphors drawn from Christianity, Islam, Hinduism and Judaism, helping make his teachings accessible and relatable to his diverse student body. Lama Losang identifies as a caretaker—a role he cultivated during his early years in monastic life and continues to express at the Chenrezig Tibetan Buddhist Center of Philadelphia (CTBC). Outside of formal teaching, he can often be found tending to the physical upkeep of the center, whether by cleaning the refrigerator or applying a new coat of sealer to the wooden doors.

When it comes to teaching, Lama Losang emphasizes the original words of the Buddha over modern interpretations or commentaries. He is not focused on the number of students who "take refuge" in Buddhism and does not seek to retain students through obligation. Rather, he encourages individuals to engage with the CTBC community while remaining open to receiving teachings from other teachers and traditions.

His life is dedicated to becoming a better human being, and he believes Buddhist training offers many profound lessons on how to live with compassion, mindfulness, and purpose.

== Location and Facilities ==
The CTBC is located in the Northern Liberties neighborhood of Philadelphia, Pennsylvania. Established in 2017, it is housed in a small brick building on a street that was once a bustling marketplace and is now a mix of old and new housing, restaurants, and other small businesses. The center is situated between two major east–west corridors, Girard Avenue and Spring Garden Street, and between 6th and 7th Streets running north–south.

When it was purchased, the building was a gutted shell. In previous incarnations, it had served as a clothing store, a chicken processing facility, and a gambling parlor. The electrical and plumbing systems were derelict, and the building required a complete renovation.

== Programs and Activities ==
Sunday Sangha is held weekly at the Chenrezig Tibetan Buddhist Center of Philadelphia, led by Lama Losang Samten or, in his absence, by senior students who have studied with him for many years. Participants may join the sessions either in person or virtually via Zoom. The center is non-sectarian and describes itself as a diverse and inclusive community of practitioners.

In addition to Sunday Sangha, the center offers several recurring weekly programs:

Meditation and Dharma Study Group – A weekly study group that explores classical Buddhist texts and their relevance to contemporary life. Meetings take place Thursdays from 7:00 to 8:30 p.m. via Zoom.

Heart Sutra Practice – Held periodically; schedule available on the center’s website.

Medicine Buddha Practice – Offered on select dates; see the calendar for details.

Throughout the year, additional teachings are offered by Lama Samten, senior members, and visiting teachers. More information can be found on the official website.

== Associated Sanghas and visiting teachers ==
Lama Losang has students in communities across the country who attend Sunday Sangha via Zoom. He visits sanghas in Winnipeg, Canada, El Paso, Texas, Chico, California annually, lecturing, holding retreats and creating sand mandalas.

== Visiting Teachers ==
Over the years, the Chenrezig Tibetan Buddhist Center of Philadelphia has hosted many notable teachers and practitioners of Buddhism, including the following:

Geshe Monlam – from the Drepung Gomang Monastery in India.

Kenzur Rinpoche – Abbot of Namgyal Monastery, where Lama Losang studied.

Ani Tenzin Palmo – Buddhist nun, subject of A Cave in the Snow and author of The Heroic Heart: Awakening Unbound Compassion. A Modern Commentary on the 37 Verses on the Practice of a Bodhisattva.

Amy Miller – Tibetan Buddhist nun.

Lama Lena – Teacher of Dzogchen and Mahamudra meditation.

Gelek Rinpoche – Tibetan Buddhist teacher and founder of Jewel Heart.

Sogyal Rinpoche – Dzogchen master and author of The Tibetan Book of Living and Dying.

Geshe Michael Roach – monk and author.

Takser Rinpoche – Eldest brother of the 14th Dalai Lama.

Ngari Rinpoche – Younger brother of the 14th Dalai Lama.

Glenn Mullin – Buddhist scholar and translator.

Lama Rinchen – Teacher.

Barry Kerzin – American physician and Buddhist monk, personal physician to His Holiness the Dalai Lama.

Palden Gyatso – Tibetan monk who was held as a political prisoner in China for 33 years.

Garchen Rinpoche – Founder and spiritual director of the Garchen Buddhist Institute in Chino Valley, Arizona.

Khenpo Konchog Gyaltsen Rinpoche – Tibetan Buddhist teacher and translator.

Loten Namling – Singer and performer of Tibetan heritage.

Cultural performances by monks for advanced study and practice of Buddhism from: Sera Monastery, Ganden Shartse Monastery, Ganden Jangtse Monastery, Gyuto Monastery and Namgyal Monastery
