= Standing Buddha from Mathura =

Standing Buddha statue at Rashtrapati Bhavan

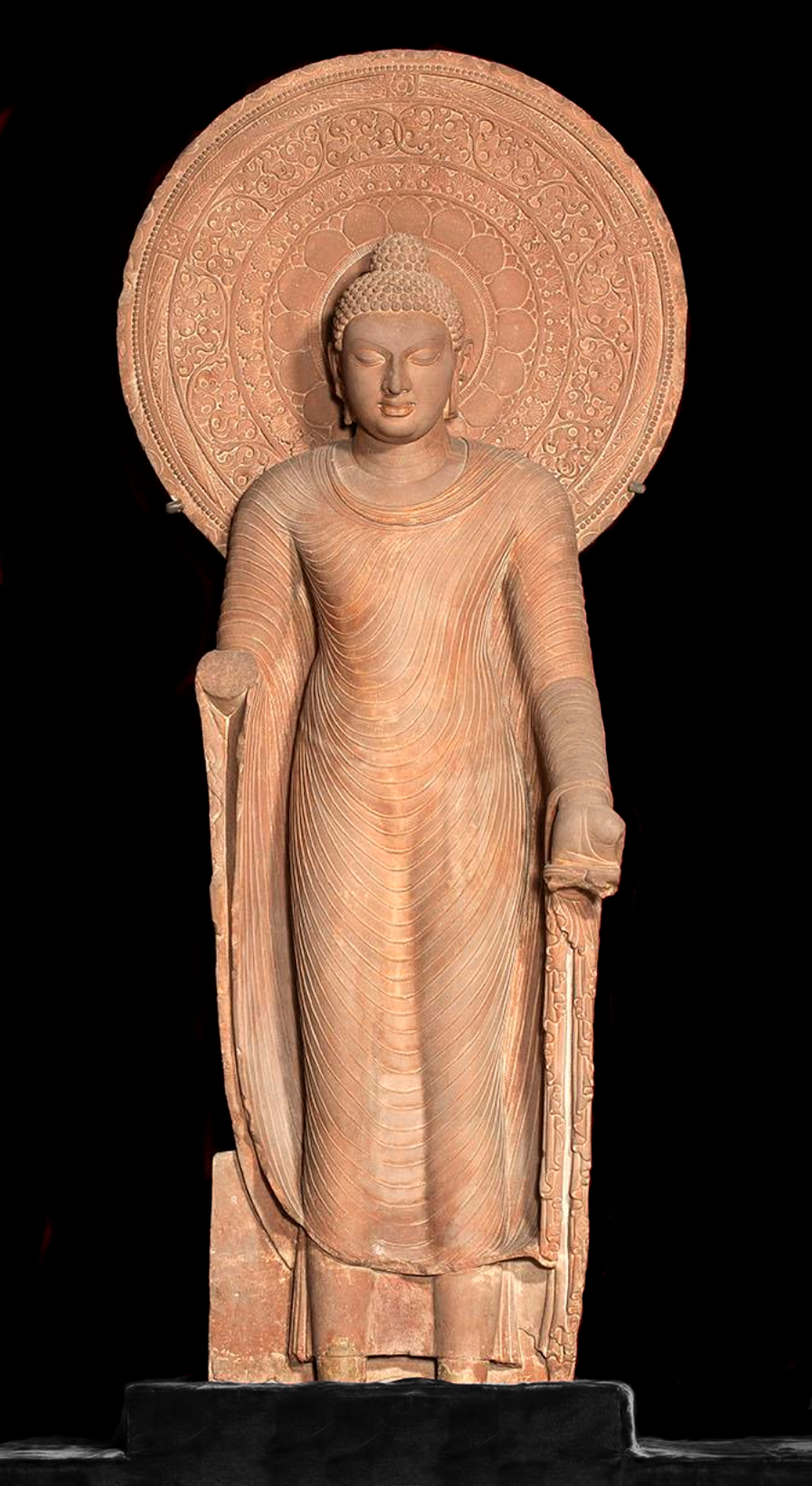
- Standing Buddha from Mathura, Gupta art.
- Material: Red sandstone
- Created: 5th century AD
- Discovered: Mathura 27.4925°N 77.673611°E
- Present location: Gantantra Mandap, Rashtrapati Bhavan, New Delhi, India

Location
- Mathura (India)

Standing Buddha from Mathura is a statue of the Buddha in standing posture, made of red sandstone, discovered in Mathura, India. It is considered "a masterpiece of Mathura school during Gupta period". Currently it is housed in Gantantra Mandap, Rashtrapati Bhavan, the presidential palace of India in New Delhi..

== Description ==
Buddha is depicted in monastic robe, with string-like schematic folds cling to and outline the body’s form. Buddha’s hair is curly with snail-shell-like pattern and is depicted with an ushnisha, urna roma and elongated earlobes.

Buddha is accompanied by a large, intricately carved circular halo with multiple motifs with floral patterns.

Buddha stands upright in samabhanga (a balanced, frontal stance) combining the robust, powerful build of earlier Kushan royal figures with soft, meditative grace.

This Buddha is believed to be belonging to Gupta period around circa 5th century CE.

A close-up view of the statue

Currently the Buddha is displayed behind the President’s Chair in a crimson velvet backdrop at Gantantra Mandap (previously “Durbar Hall”) of Rashtrapati Bhavan.
