= Ekākṣaroṣṇīṣacakra =

Buddhist deity

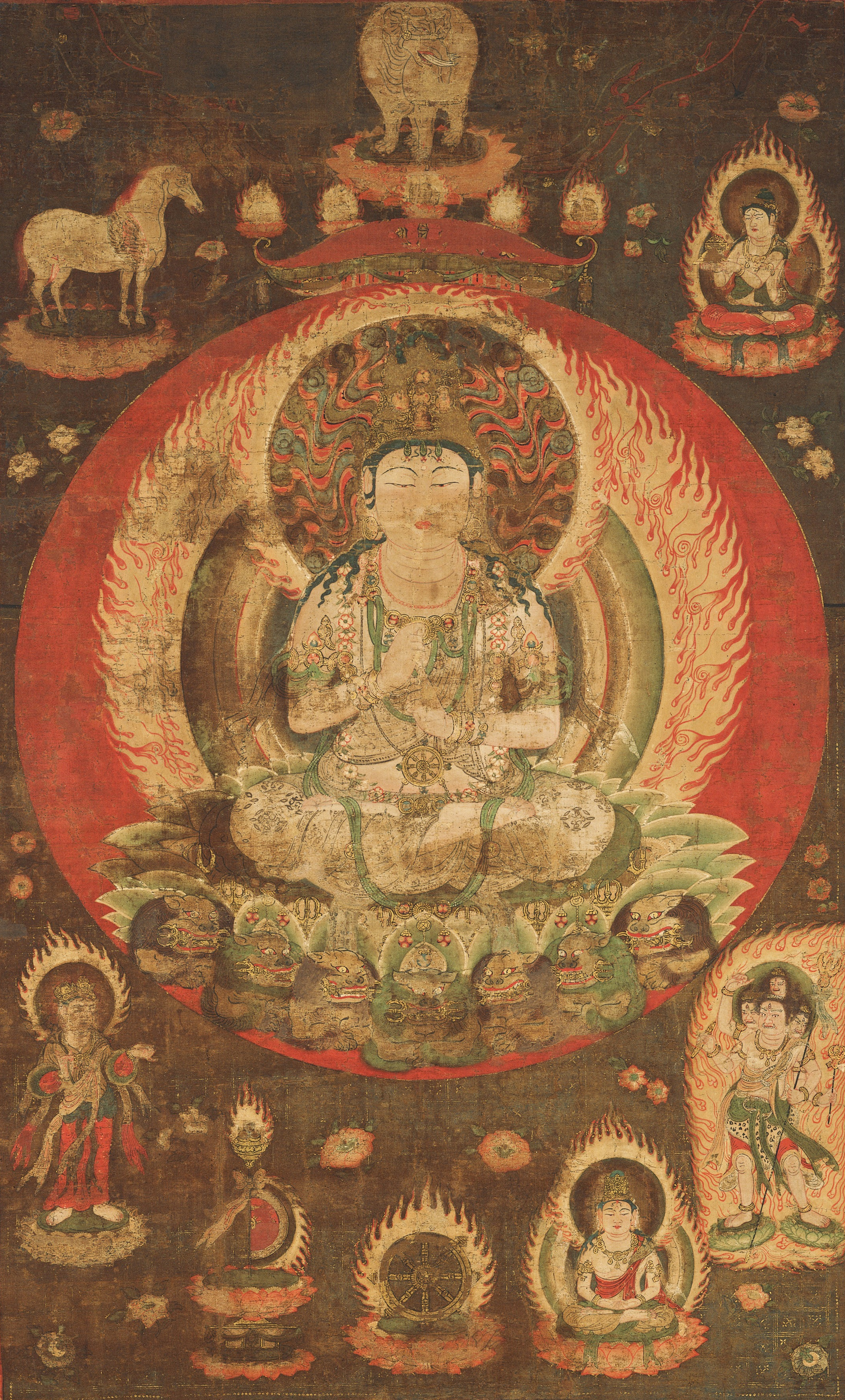
- 12nd-century (Heian period) Mandala of the One-Syllable Golden Wheel, Nara National Museum.
- Sanskrit: एकाक्षरोष्णीषचक्र; Ekākṣaroṣṇīṣacakra
- Chinese: 一字金輪佛頂 (Pinyin: Yīzì Jīnlún Fódǐng) 一字奇特佛頂 (Pinyin: Yīzì Qítè Fódǐng)
- Japanese: 一字金輪仏頂(いちじきんりんぶっちょう) (romaji: Ichiji Kinrin Butchō) 一字奇特仏頂(いちじきとくぶっちょう) (romaji: Ichiji Kitoku Butchō)
- Korean: 일자금륜불정 一字金輪佛頂 (RR: Ilja Geumryun Buljeong)
- Vietnamese: Nhất Tự Kim Luân Phật Đỉnh 一字金輪佛頂

Information
- Venerated by: Mahayana, Vajrayana
- Attributes: Dharmacakra

Ekākṣaroṣṇīṣacakra (एकाक्षरोष्णीषचक्र), Japanese name Ichiji Kinrin Butchō (一字金輪仏頂), is a Buddhoṣṇīṣa and deification of the single-letter mantra Bhrūṃ (Devanagari: भ्रूँ, Siddham: 𑖥𑖿𑖨𑖳𑖼 , Japanese: ボロン), which was taught by the Buddha while settled in a profound state of samādhi.

The term “ekākṣara" (一字, Japanese: ichiji, lit. “one letter”) refers to the mantra "Bhrūṃ," which is expressed using a single Sanskrit syllable. "Uṣṇīṣacakra" (金輪, Japanese: kinrin, lit. “Golden Wheel”) refers to the most exalted of the Cakravartin kings, symbolizing the exceptional spiritual efficacy of this deity. In the Ichiji Kinrin Mandala (一字金輪曼荼羅), he is depicted alongside the seven treasures that accompany a Cakravartin king, which include the golden wheel, wish-fulfilling jewel, queen, horse, elephant, treasurer, and general).

Depending on the scriptural source, two forms of this deity are described: Śākyamuni of the Golden Wheel (Shaka Kinrin 釈迦金輪), representing Śākyamuni in the form of a Tathāgata, and Vairocana of the Golden Wheel (Dainichi Kinrin 大日金輪), representing Mahāvairocana in the form of a bodhisattva.

== Śākyamuni of the Golden Wheel ==
Śākyamuni of the Golden Wheel (釈迦金輪) is regarded as a Buddha Crown manifested by Śākyamuni Buddha. His samaya form (三昧耶形) is the eight-spoked wheel, and his seed syllable is "Bhrūṃ." In sculptural representations, he typically appears in the Tathāgata form with spiraled hair (螺髪) and dressed in red robes. He sits with a wheel placed atop both hands in the dhyāna mudrā, and is seated atop Mount Sumeru, within either a white moon disk halo that surrounds his entire body or a red sun disk. In some depictions, the Wheel Treasure also appears encircling the halo.

According to the Dhāraṇī Collection Sūtra, Volume One (Taishō No. 901), he is depicted as follows:

His body is pure gold in color and he wears a red kāṣāya. He wears a crown adorned with the seven precious jewels and emits light from his entire body. His hands form a mudrā while he sits in full lotus posture on a lotus throne adorned with the seven treasures. Beneath the lotus throne stands a golden wheel, and beneath that is drawn a jeweled pool.

Śākyamuni of the Golden Wheel is said to subdue planetary deities, such as the navagraha, using his cakra. Within Sukuyōdō (宿曜道), he is highly regarded as a principal deity for rituals that ward off calamities caused by malevolent stars or planetary influences. He is the central figure in the Star Mandala.

== Vairocana of the Golden Wheel ==
Vairocana of the Golden Wheel (Dainichi Kinrin 大日金輪) is manifested by Mahāvairocana Tathāgata and is the personification of the mantra "Bhrūṃ", which was recited by Vairocana of the Vajra Realm (金剛界大日) after entering the Sun Disk Samādhi of the Womb Realm (胎蔵界日輪三昧).

His samaya form is the twelve-spoked wheel (十二輻輪), and he shares the same seed syllable with Shaka Kinrin—"Bhrūṃ." In appearance, he is adorned with the jeweled crown of the five wisdoms (五智宝冠) and other ornaments. He is depicted with his hands in the wisdom fist mudrā (智拳印) while seated on a white lotus supported by seven lions. A primary difference between Vairocana of the Vajra Realm and Vairocana of the Golden Wheel is that the former is seated within a white moon disk, while the latter sits within a red sun disk. Sometimes, a wheel treasure (輪宝) is depicted surrounding the sun disk as well.

In Tendai Buddhism, Dainichi Kinrin is regarded as a principal deity of the Susiddhi rite (蘇悉地法), and revered equally with Vairocana of the Vajra and Womb Realms.

Moreover, Vairocana of the Golden Wheel is believed to be an alternate form of Buddhalocanā (Butsugen Butsumo 仏眼仏母), the two being inseparable. In this view, the form of Vairocana of the Vajra Realm, in the state of the Sun Disk Samādhi of the Womb Realm, is embodied in Vairocana of the Golden Wheel, while the form of Vairocana of the Womb Realm, in the state of the Sun Disk Samādhi of the Vajra Realm, is Buddhalocanā.

This duality also signifies that Ekākṣaroṣṇīṣacakra subdues sentient beings, while Buddhalocanā is responsible for converting them, emphasizing their complementary roles. The evil spirits defeated by the power of Ekākṣaroṣṇīṣacakra's wheel treasure are revived as benevolent gods by the true eye of Buddhalocanā.

The Mandala of Ekākṣaroṣṇīṣacakra features an image of Buddhalocanā, while the Mandala of Buddhalocanā contains an image of Ekākṣaroṣṇīṣacakra, again symbolizing the mutual relationship and complementary powers between the two. Rituals involving Ekākṣaroṣṇīṣacakra as the main deity are considered to be extremely powerful. It was said that all other rituals performed within a 500-yojana radius of the ritual site would be nullified. For this reason, the Shingon school believed that only the chief priest of Tō-ji could be authorized to perform this ritual.

== Iconography ==
Ekākṣaroṣṇīṣacakra is often depicted in paintings, but rarely represented in statuary. One notable example of such imagery is the wooden seated Ichiji Kinrin Butchō Statue (木造一字金輪坐像) housed at Chūson-ji. This statue is an Important Cultural Property and is considered a secret Buddha, meaning it is typically not displayed to the public.

He is traditionally believed to have been the principal Buddha worshipped by Fujiwara no Hidehira, the third ruler of the Northern Fujiwara clan.

== Literature ==
Ekākṣaroṣṇīṣacakra appears in several texts that are significant to Vajrayāna Buddhism, all of which were translated into Chinese by the sixth patriarch of Esoteric Buddhism, Amoghavajra. These include:

- Summary on the Method of Chanting the Golden Wheel King Buddha Crown (金輪王佛頂要略念誦法, T. 0948)
- Sūtra of the One-Syllable Wheel-Turning King Spoken at the Seat of Enlightenment (菩提場所說一字頂輪王經, T. 950)
- Ekākṣarabuddhoṣṇīṣacakrarāja Sūtra (一字佛頂輪王經, T. 0951)
- Dhāraṇī Sūtra on the Samādhi of the Five Buddha Crowns (五佛頂三昧陀羅尼經, T. 0952)
- Uṣṇīṣa Cakravartī Tantra (一字奇特佛頂經, T. 0953)
- Ritual Manual for the Recitation of the One-Syllable Crowned Wheel-Turning King (一字頂輪王念誦儀軌, T. 0954A and 0954B)
- Ritual Manual for the Yogic Visualization Practice of the One-Syllable Crowned Wheel-Turning King (一字頂輪王瑜伽觀行儀軌, T. 0955)

== See also ==
- Buddhoṣṇīṣa
- Hoshi Matsuri
- Śākyamuni
- Vairocana
