= Hoshi Matsuri =

Esoteric Buddhist rite

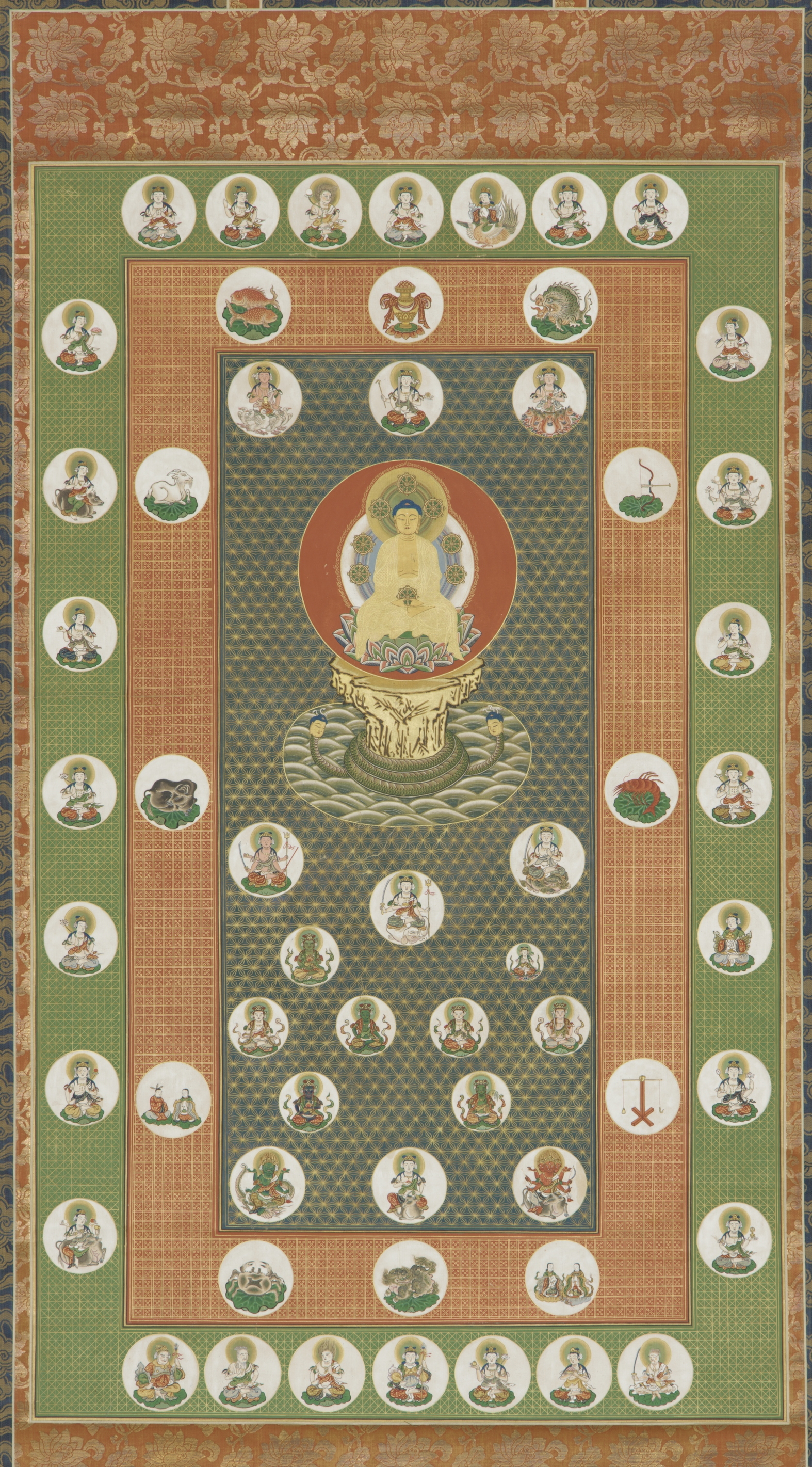
A Shingon-style Star Mandala, used during Star Festival rites, Edo period.

Hoshi Matsuri (星まつり, "Star Festival") is a Buddhist ritual performed on occasions such as the lunar New Year, the beginning of spring (risshun), setsubun, or the winter solstice. Its purpose is to eliminate various disasters that may occur throughout the world or within the nation, as well as misfortunes affecting individuals. It is also known as Hoshi Kuyō (星供養, "Star Offering"), Hoshiku (星供), or the Hokuto-hō (北斗法, "Northern Dipper Rite").

== Overview ==
In Esoteric Buddhism, which belongs to the later phase of Mahāyāna teachings, Hoshi Matsuri is a ritual centered on deities such as Ekakṣara-uṣṇīṣacakra (一字金輪仏頂, ichiji kinrin butchō; lit. "One-Syllable Golden Wheel Buddha Uṣṇīṣa"), a title given to Dainichi Kinrin (大日金輪; "Mahāvairocana as the Golden Wheel") or Shaka Kinrin (釈迦金輪, "Śākyamuni as the Golden Wheel") who is the main deity in the Star Mandala (星曼荼羅, hoshi Mandara); Seven-Star Cintāmaṇicakra (七星如意輪観音) in the Seven-Star Nyoirin Mandala (七星如意輪曼荼羅); or Sudṛṣṭi Bodhisattva (妙見菩薩) in the Myōken Mandala (妙見曼荼羅).

The ritual is a form of esoteric practice and ceremony intended to worship the year's principal stars, as well as each individual's guardian star of the year (当年星, tōnenjō) and birth star (本命星, honmyōjō).

Although the term “honmyōjō” is also used in Nine Star Ki astrology (九星気学, kyūsei kigaku), in this context it refers not to the nine stars of that system, but rather to the seven stars of the Big Dipper and the Navagraha.

In Esoteric Buddhist astrology, as represented by the Star Mandala (星曼荼羅, hoshi mandara), the practice is founded on two main pillars: esoteric ritual practice and esoteric astronomy and astrology. One of the nine planets, or one of the seven stars of the Big Dipper, is designated as a person’s birth star, which governs their destiny.

The star that governs a person’s fate for a given year is also called the Tōnen Zokushō (当年属星, "Yearly Governing Star"). These stars are venerated through ritual offerings to pray for personal happiness throughout the year and to ward off misfortunes.

== See also ==
- Onmyōdō
- Shingon Buddhism
- Tendai Buddhism
- Vairocana
