= Phuntsog Namgyal (disambiguation) =

Phuntsog Namgyal may refer to any of the following:

- Phuntsog Namgyal (1604-1670), king in Sikkim
- Phuntsog Namgyal II (1733–1780), king in Sikkim
- Phuntsog Namgyal, king of the Namgyal dynasty of Ladakh

== See also ==
- Namgyal (disambiguation)
- Phuntsok Namgyal, an Indian politician from Ladakh
