= Namgyal dynasty =

Namgyal dynasty may refer to these former dynasties in India:

- Namgyal dynasty of Sikkim
- Namgyal dynasty of Ladakh

== See also ==
- Namgyal (disambiguation)
- Chogyal, the rulers of these dynasties
