= Losang Samten =

Tibetan-American sand artist

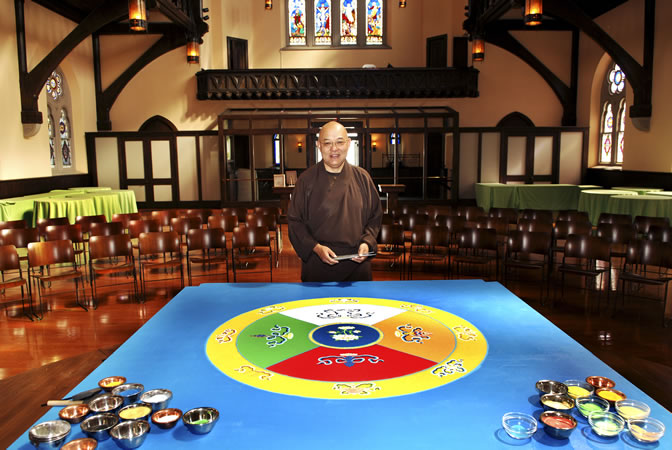
Samten in 2002

Losang Samten (Tibetan: བློ་བཟང་བསམ་གཏན།, Wylie: blo-bzang bsam-gtan) is a Tibetan-American scholar, sand mandala artist, former Buddhist monk, and Spiritual Director of the Chenrezig Tibetan Buddhist Center of Philadelphia. He is one of only an estimated 30 people worldwide who are qualified to teach the traditional art of Tibetan sandpainting. He has written two books and helped to create the first Tibetan sand mandala ever shown publicly in the West in 1988. In 2002, he was made a National Heritage Fellow by the National Endowment of the Arts. In 2004, he was granted a Pew Fellowship in Folk and Traditional Arts.

== Early life ==
Born into a Buddhist family in Chung Ribuce (Ü-Tsang, Tibet) in 1953, Samten spent two months crossing the Himalayas with his family to Nepal in 1959. After arriving in Dharamsala, India in 1964 or 1965, Samten entered Namgyal Monastery in Dharamsala, taking the vows of a novice monk there in 1967. He probably took full ordination at Namgyal in 1969.

While enrolled at Namgyal, Samten also studied the arts of ritual dance and sand mandala construction at the Tibetan Institute of Performing Arts. (Both institutions are closely associated with the 14th Dalai Lama.) In 1985 he earned a Master's Degree in Buddhist Philosophy, Sutra, and Tantra from Namgyal Monastery.

== Career ==
After fleeing central Tibet as a child refugee in 1959, Samten studied, debated, and practiced for more than two decades in exile at Namgyal Monastery: since its establishment (in either 1564 or 1565) by the 3rd Dalai Lama, the personal monastery of all the Dalai Lamas. In 1975, Samten began the intensive three-year program which would ultimately enable him to construct traditional mandalas out of sand. He earned the formal title Geshe in 1985, having won a Master's Degree in Buddhist Philosophy, Sutra, and Tantra: roughly equivalent to a Western academic institution's Ph.D. Samten then served the 14th Dalai Lama as his personal attendant from 1985–1988, after which, he moved to the US.

In 1988, Samten was charged by the 14th Dalai Lama to come to the United States to demonstrate the sand mandala art form; marking the first time that a Tibetan mandala was constructed in the West, at New York City's American Museum of Natural History. Moving to Philadelphia in 1989, he joined Kelsang Monlam (from Drepung Gomang Monastic College, d. 2012, age 87), and eventually became the spiritual director of the Tibetan Buddhist Center of Philadelphia. Samten left monastic life in 1995. He has established seven separate dharma centers in the U.S. and Canada, and currently resides in Philadelphia.

In 1997, Samten worked on the Martin Scorsese film Kundun – about the young 14th Dalai Lama – as religious technical advisor, sand mandala supervisor, and actor.

Samten has also written two books, including Ancient Teachings in Modern Times: Buddhism in the 21st Century. His history of Namgyal Monastery is written in Tibetan.

== Mandala art ==
Since moving to the US in 1988, Samten has been commissioned to create works for numerous museums and institutions, including the Chicago Field Museum, Columbia University, Harvard University, the Metropolitan Museum of Art, the Philadelphia Museum of Art, and the Smithsonian Institution to name just a few. Samten has demonstrated the traditional practice of creating powdered mandalas at the following museums:

- the Albuquerque Museum of Art,
- the American Museum of Natural History in New York City in 1988,
- the Asian Art Museum in San Francisco,
- the Chicago Field Museum,
- the Helena Art Museum in Helena, Montana,
- the Metropolitan Museum of Art in New York,
- the Northern Californian Museum of Art in Chico, CA
- the University of Pennsylvania's Museum of Archaeology and Anthropology,
- the Museum of International Folk Art in Santa Fe, New Mexico,
- the Nevada Museum of Art in Reno,
- the Philadelphia Museum of Art,
- the Phillips Museum at Franklin, Pennsylvania,
- the Santa Barbara Art Museum, and
- the Smithsonian Institution in Washington, D.C.

and the following Colleges, Universities, and institutions of higher learning:

- Butte College in Oroville, CA
- California State University, Chico
- Colby College, Waterville, Maine, in 2005,
- Columbia University,
- Georgetown University,
- Harvard University,
- Massachusetts Institute of Technology in 2009,
- New York University,
- Rhode Island School of Design,
- Smith College, Massachusetts,
- State University of Louisiana at Shreveport,
- Temple University,
- Trinity College of Hartford, Connecticut,
- University of California, Santa Barbara,
- University of Columbus, Ohio,
- University of Delaware, Pennsylvania,
- University of Texas at El Paso in 1997 and 2012,
- University of Nevada, Reno,
- University of Pennsylvania,
- University of Regina, Saskatchewan, Canada, and
- University of Arizona, Tucson.

== Awards and honors ==
- In 2002, Samten was made a National Heritage Fellow by the National Endowment for the Arts.
- In 2004, he was granted a Pew Fellowship in Folk and Traditional Arts.
