= Gyalpo =

Gyalpo (རྒྱལ་པོ) is a term in Tibetic languages that is translated as "king" in English.

It may refer to:

- Druk Gyalpo, title of the King of Bhutan
- Gyalpo of Ladakh, title of the King of Ladakh
- Gyalpo Lhosar, the Tibetan New Year and a new year festival of Sherpa people of Nepal
- Gyalpo spirits, gods and spirits in Tibetan mythology and religion
- Mipham Wanggyur Gyalpo, ruler of Tibet (1604–1613)

== See also ==
- Namgyal (disambiguation)
