= Ushnishasitatapattra =

Special form of the Buddhist goddess Tara

Thousand-Armed Ushnishasitatapattra is a special form of the goddess Tara, a female form of the thousand-armed Avalokiteshvara. Her iconography is probably the most complex in the Tibetan Buddhist pantheon. The goddess has as many heads and legs as she has arms. She tramples on both human beings and animals. Pressed under her feet, they symbolize egocentric existence, while the function of her umbrella is to protect all beings from all fears.

Ushnishasitatapattra is a powerful independent deity. She manifests this power with her thousand faces, thousand arms and thousand legs. Each face has three eyes, and the palm and wrist of each hand has its own eyes. In this detailed painting she displays them all in multiple rows, including a tall stack of heads in four different colors. Her appearance is bolstered by her vigorous posture, emphasized by her wide billowing brocaded tent-like skirts and long, twisting, green scarves. Her slightly fierce mien does not outweigh the expressions of her benign nature - the beauty of her form, her white color, and the refinement of her small round face and tiny, idealized features.

Ushnishasitatapattra is popular with the Geluk order in particular. She is often given a prominent position among the wall paintings in Gelukpa monasteries, such as Drepung in Lhasa.
