= Loten Namling =

Indian-born Swiss singer and musician

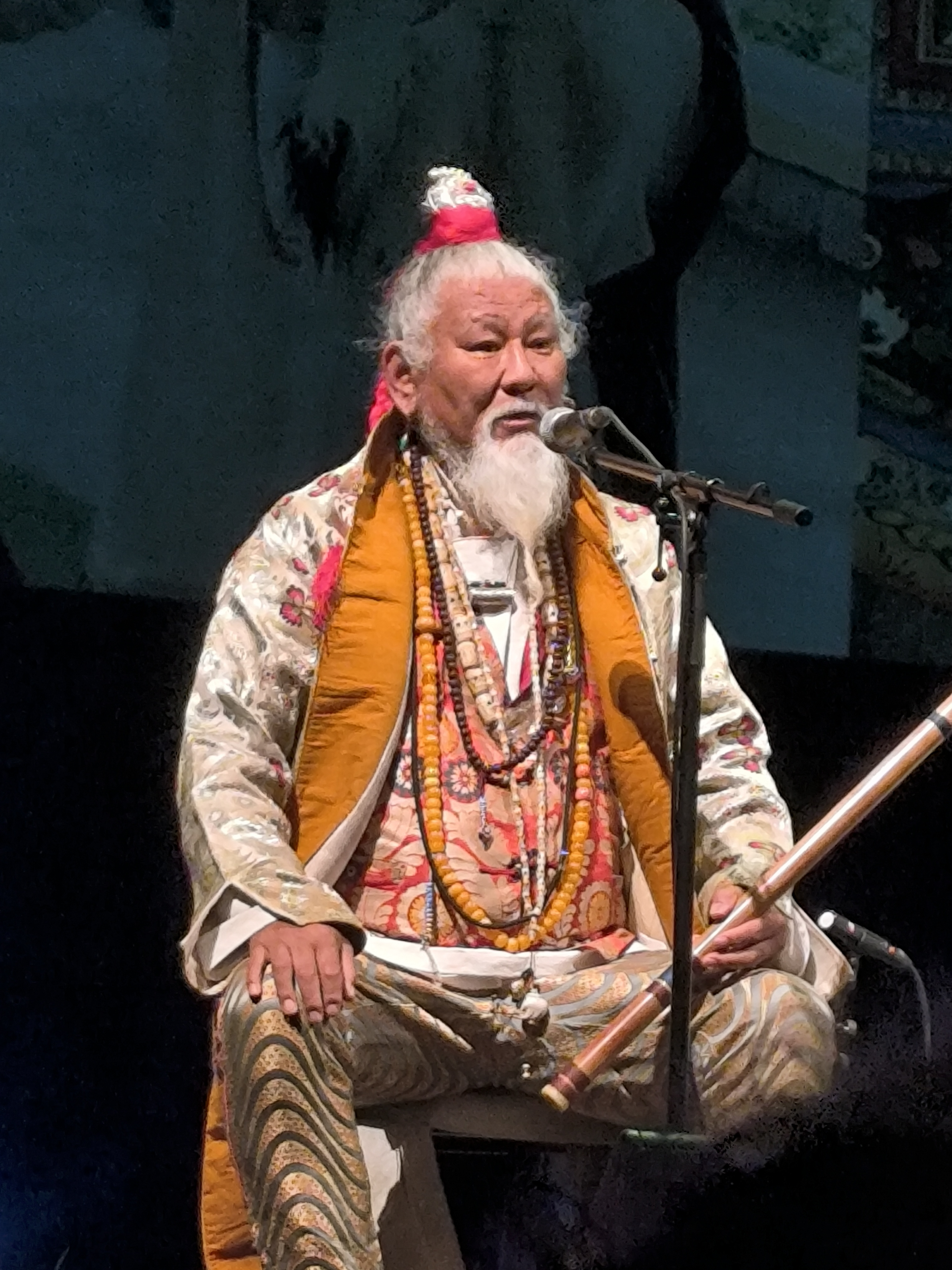
- Loten Namling in Prague (2025)

Background information
- Born: 1963 (age 62–63); Dharamsala, India

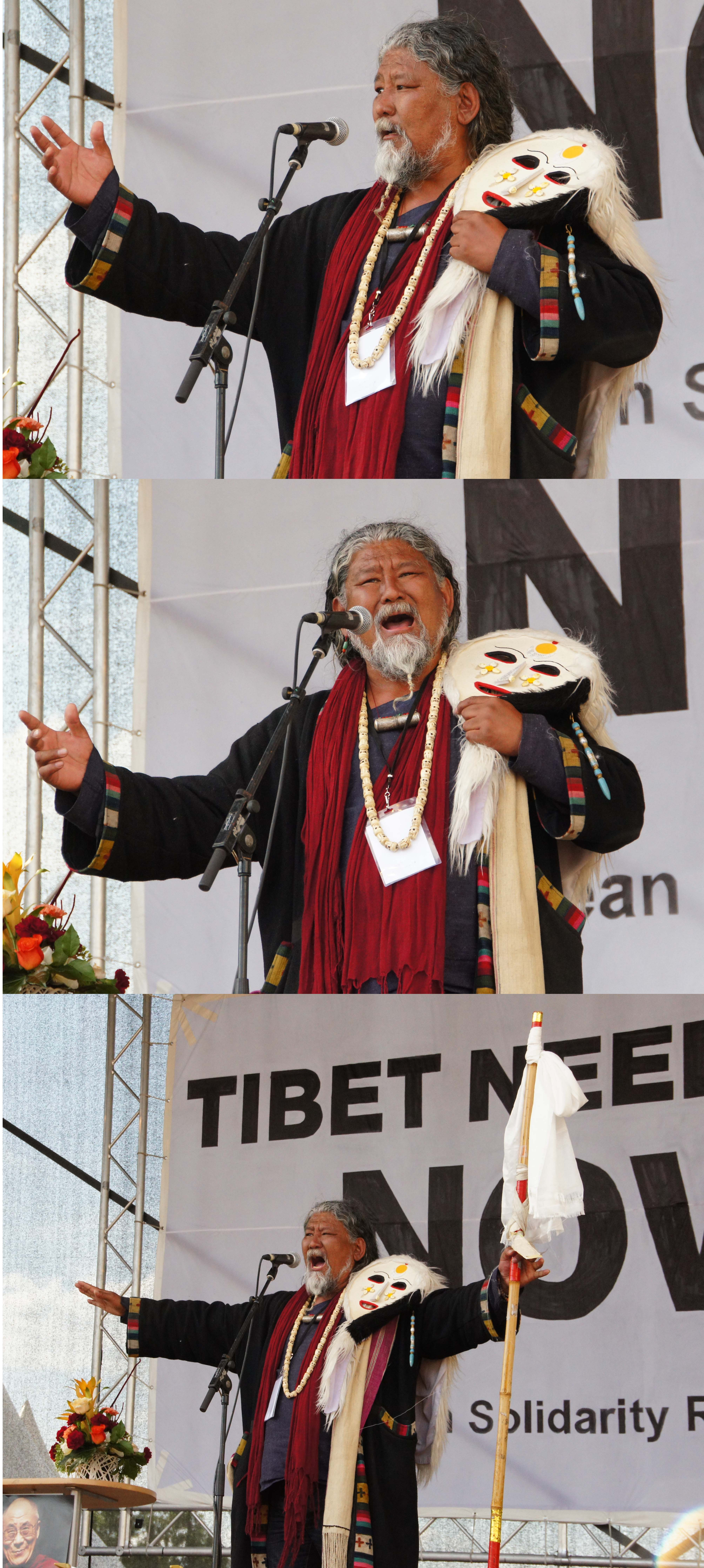
Loten Namling

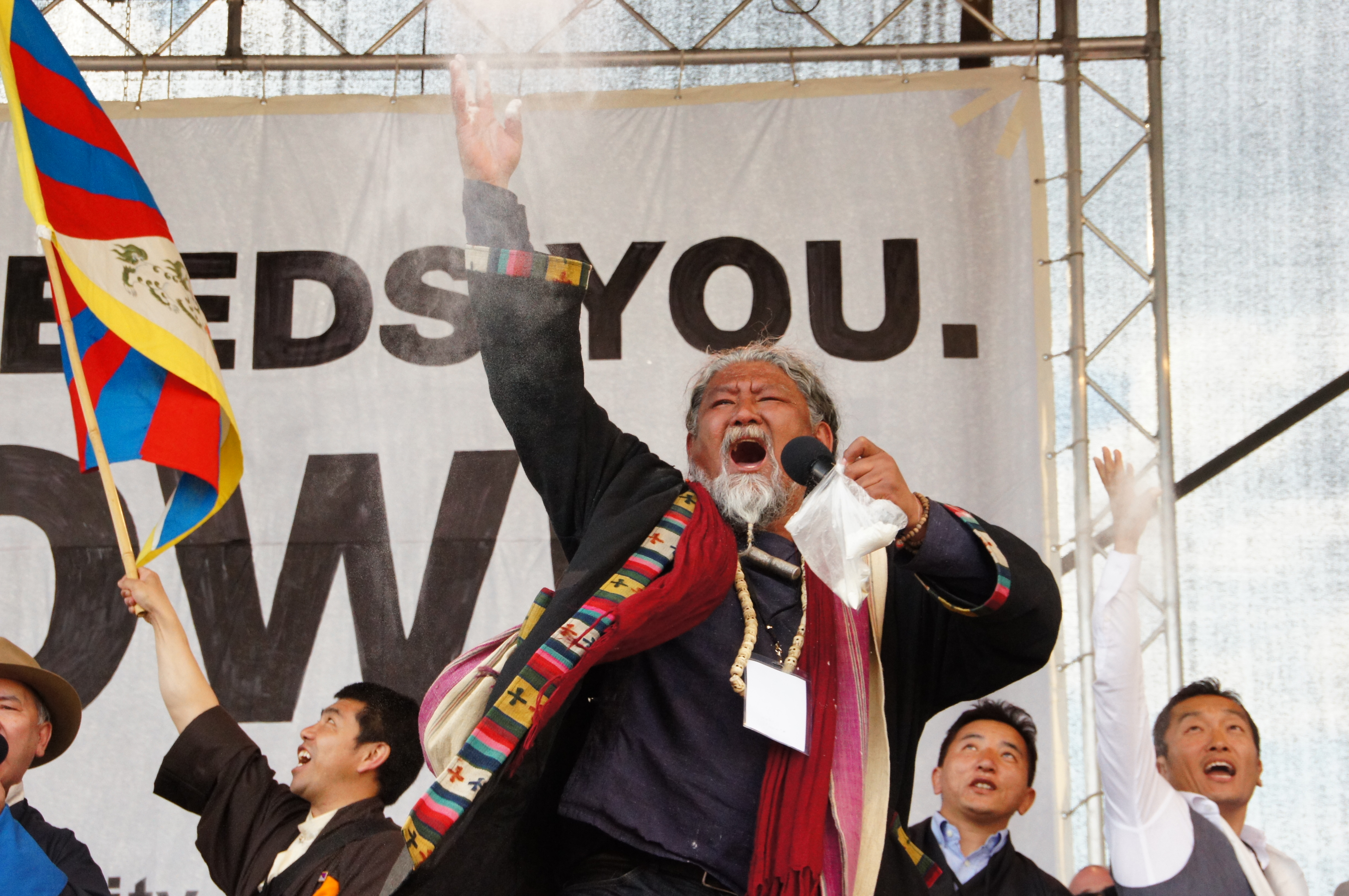
...performing a well-wishing ceremony, 2012-05-26.

Loten Namling is an Indian-born Tibetan singer, musical artist, entertainer and cartoonist currently living in Switzerland. He is working on his project, "Blues", in which he explores paths linking the songs to culture.

The 14th Dalai Lama once called Loten "a singer with a voice."

Based in Switzerland, the artist has travelled worldwide with his lute, singing the songs of the 2nd Dalai Lama, as well as other traditional songs, and his own songs. From Kalmykia to Korea to Wales, Namling has performed worldwide, telling stories about his life, connecting songs of the past to the reality of the present, and inviting his audience on a journey through the landscape of spirituality.

== Early life ==
Namling was born in India of Tibetan refugee parents.

== Activism ==
On 13 May 2013, Namling started what he called A Journey for Freedom – One Man, One Path. He walked from the Swiss capital of Bern to Geneva, dragging a black coffin around to attract attention. Arriving on 8 July, he performed with some 13 more musicians, amongst them renowned Swiss band The Young Gods whose singer Franz Treichler had strongly supported the artist's action and had organized the performance on Place des Nations, in front of Geneva UN headquarters. It inspired Tibetan Warrior, a documentary film directed by Dodo Hunziker and produced by Urs Schnell, about the quest of Loten Namling from Europe to India where he met with politicians, experts and young radicalists before requesting the Dalai Lama his advice.

In October 2013, Namling was given the Free Spirit Award in McLeod Ganj for this "Journey of freedom" march.

On November 11, 2025, Namling arrived in Prague at the invitation of the Association Czechs Support Tibet and performed at the "Dalai Lama 90 & Havel 89" celebration of the 90th birthday of the 14th Dalai Lama and the unexpired 89th birthday of Czech President Václav Havel. Richard Gere supported the organizers of the evening and thanked for Tibet to the President of the Czech Republic, Petr Pavel.

== Discography ==
- Songs of Narcissism (1999)
- Black Crane (2001)
