= Namgyal Monastery Institute of Buddhist Studies =

Coordinates: 42°26′37″N 76°29′45″W

Namgyal Monastery Institute of Buddhist Studies incorporates two institutions: (1) the North American Seat of Namgyal Monastery; and (2) a Tibetan Buddhist theological seminary affiliated with it. The two institutions share a dharma center in Ithaca, New York. The Dalai Lama is their patron, the highest authority (for the former), and consultant (for the latter).

"Namgyal" (rNam rGyal) is the Tibetan name of a long-life deity.

== The North American Seat of Namgyal Monastery ==
Namgyal Monastery (Ithaca) is a branch of the personal monastery of the Dalai Lama, also called Namgyal Monastery. It therefore belongs to the Gelugpa monastic order. Traditionally located within the Potala Palace, and charged with various ritual tasks connected with the Dalai Lama, the parent monastery in 1959 relocated to Dharamsala along with the Tibetan exile government. Monks from Dharamsala are rotated in and out of the Ithaca branch, with about five in residence there at any one time. They are one of several groups which send teams of Tibetan monks on tour to construct sand mandalas.

== Namgyal Institute of Buddhist Studies ==
The institute was founded in 1992, on the advice of the Dalai Lama. The major organizer was Sidney Piburn, former middleweight boxer and editor/co-founder of Snow Lion Publications (and Piburn is named as the Institute's "founder" on the cover of several books). Namgyal's website names the late Pema Losang Chogyen—a monk associated with the early days of the institute—as its "inspiration."

Namgyal Institute offers a three-year program emphasizing Tibetan language, Buddhist philosophy, and meditation practice. It does not award degrees. (Its administrators contemplated offering a "Master of Sutra and Tantra" degree, but this is the same degree awarded by the parent monastery for thirteen years of study.) The core program was designed in part by the Dalai Lama, and aimed at Western dharma practitioners. Though oriented towards the Gelugpa school, Namgyal is "nonsectarian" in the sense of being open to non-Gelug lineages.

The teachers are drawn partly from the Namgyal monks, and partly from visiting teachers (including many well-known scholars in the field of Buddhist Studies). There are part-time as well as full-time students, and many activities are ones which could be found at almost any dharma center, such as pujas, dharma talks, workshops, retreats, and short courses.

The institute was formerly housed in a Victorian house on Aurora Street, but has since constructed a Tibetan-style temple complex, called Dü Khor Choe Ling (dus 'khor chos gling, "Kalachakra Center").

A number of books from Snow Lion Publications bear the label "A Namgyal Institute Textbook."
