= Tejaprabhā Buddha =

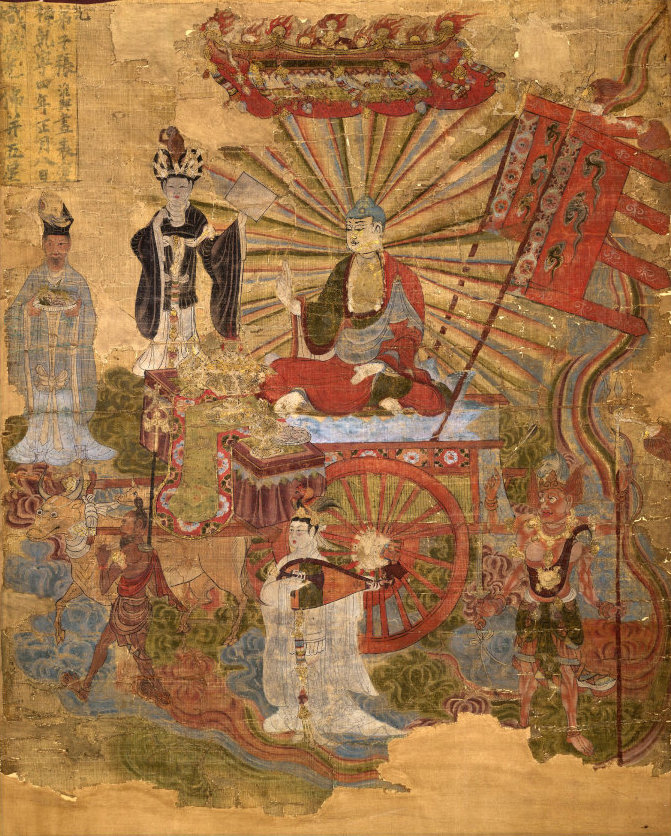
- Tejaprabhā Buddha and the Five Planets, a Tang dynasty silk painting from Dunhuang, housed in the British Museum.
- Sanskrit: Tejaprabhā (तेजप्रभा); Prajvaloṣṇīṣa (प्रज्वलोष्णीष)
- Chinese: 熾盛光佛 (Chìshèngguāng Fó) 熾盛光如來 (Chìshèngguāng Rúlái)
- Japanese: 熾盛光仏頂 (Shijōkō-bucchō)
- Korean: 치성광여래 (Chiseonggwang Yeorae)
- Vietnamese: Xí Thịnh Quang Phật

Information
- Venerated by: Chinese Esoteric Buddhism, Korean Buddhism, Japanese Esoteric Buddhism
- Attributes: Lord of the constellations; granter of rain, bountiful harvests, longevity, and wealth; averter of astral calamities

Tejaprabhā Buddha (Chinese: 熾盛光佛; pinyin: Chìshèngguāng Fó; Korean: 치성광여래; Hanja: 熾盛光如來; RR: Chiseonggwang Yeorae), also known as the Buddha of Blazing Light, is a Buddha worshipped in Chinese Esoteric Buddhism. He is linked to the planets and stars and is believed to protect people from bad luck and disasters caused by them. His worship began in China during the Tang dynasty and later spread to Korea and Japan.

== Iconography ==
Images of Tejaprabhā Buddha survive from the Tang to the Ming dynasties. Fewer than 100 works from this period are known today. Many show him with gods of the planets, stars and constellations. Some of these figures come from Daoist beliefs about the heavens.

The images are divided into three main types. The first shows Tejaprabhā sitting on a lotus seat in a cart pulled by an ox. Five gods of the planets travel with him. They are shown as people wearing different clothes and carrying different objects. This type was common during the late Tang and early Song dynasties. A painting from Dunhuang, dated to 897 and now in the British Museum, is an example of this type.

The second type shows Tejaprabhā sitting or preaching, with gods of the planets and stars around him. These paintings were common during the Western Xia, Liao and Yuan dynasties. Tejaprabhā is often much larger than the other figures. The third type is found in temple wall paintings. It shows Tejaprabhā with two bodhisattvas beside him and other gods around them.

== Origins ==
The worship of Tejaprabhā Buddha grew in China around the ninth century. It came from Buddhist beliefs about the planets and Chinese beliefs about the stars. The Northern Dipper (Big Dipper) and the Pole Star were important in Chinese religion. People believed that the stars could affect their lives and bring good or bad luck. Daoists also worshipped these stars and used them in religious rituals.

Buddhist texts from the Tang dynasty brought Indian ideas about the planets to China. These ideas became part of Chinese Buddhist practices. The gods of the planets were shown in human form, and some of their images came from India and the Near East. Chinese beliefs about the Northern Dipper and the Pole Star also shaped the worship of Tejaprabhā. In Buddhist art, he was shown as a ruler of the stars, much like the Daoist god who ruled the northern sky.

Buddhist texts about Tejaprabhā describe rituals for protection from disasters linked to the planets and stars. These include eclipses, comets and other events in the sky that people saw as bad signs. The texts also mention Rahu and Ketu, two figures from Indian astrology linked to eclipses. People prayed to Tejaprabhā and recited sacred spells to protect themselves from these dangers.

The name "Tejaprabhā" is also used by modern scholars, but Jeffrey Kotyk notes that it does not appear in known Sanskrit texts. He explains that the name was made by translating the Chinese name back into Sanskrit in the nineteenth century.

== Venerated in Korea ==
The worship of Tejaprabhā Buddha spread from China to Korea and Japan. In Korea, he is known as Chiseonggwang Yeorae (치성광여래; 熾盛光如來).

During the Goryeo dynasty, the royal court held ceremonies to worship Chiseonggwang Yeorae. These included Sojae toryang (消災道場), or Rituals for Averting Calamities. People believed that changes in the stars and planets could bring disasters. The ceremonies were held to protect the country and its people from such dangers.

His worship continued during the Joseon dynasty and became part of Korean folk religion. Many Korean Buddhist temples have a Chilseonggak (칠성각; 七星閣), or Shrine of the Seven Stars. Chiseonggwang Yeorae is worshipped there with the Big Dipper and other star gods. An 1878 painting of Chiseonggwang Yeorae, now in the Cleveland Museum of Art, was paid for by women of the royal court who prayed for the well-being of their families.

Chiseonggwang Yeorae also appears in records from the time of Gung Ye (r. 901–918), the founder of Taebong. The Goryeosa says that an image of Chiseonggwang Yeorae stood at Balsapsa Temple (勃颯寺), with a statue of Jinseon (塡星/鎭星), the god of Saturn in front of it. However, the earlier Samguk Sagi mentions only the statue of Jinseon. Scholar Jeong Jin-hee says this does not prove that Chiseonggwang Yeorae was the temple's main Buddha.

Historian Lee Jae-bum argues that Gung Ye's religious ideas were influenced by the worship of Chiseonggwang Yeorae and the stars. Lee suggests that Gung Ye used these beliefs to support his claim to be a divine ruler. He also links the name of Gung Ye's reign era, Mutae (武泰), to a star in the Big Dipper and the worship of Chiseonggwang Yeorae.
