= Ushnisha =

Protuberance atop of the head of the Buddha

Translations of Ushnisha
- English: ushnisha
- Sanskrit: उष्णीष (IAST: uṣṇīṣa)
- Pali: उण्हीस (uṇhīsa)
- Bengali: উষ্ণীষ (ushnish)
- Chinese: 肉髻 (Pinyin: ròu jì)
- Japanese: 肉髻 (Rōmaji: nikukei)
- Korean: 육계 (RR: yukgye)

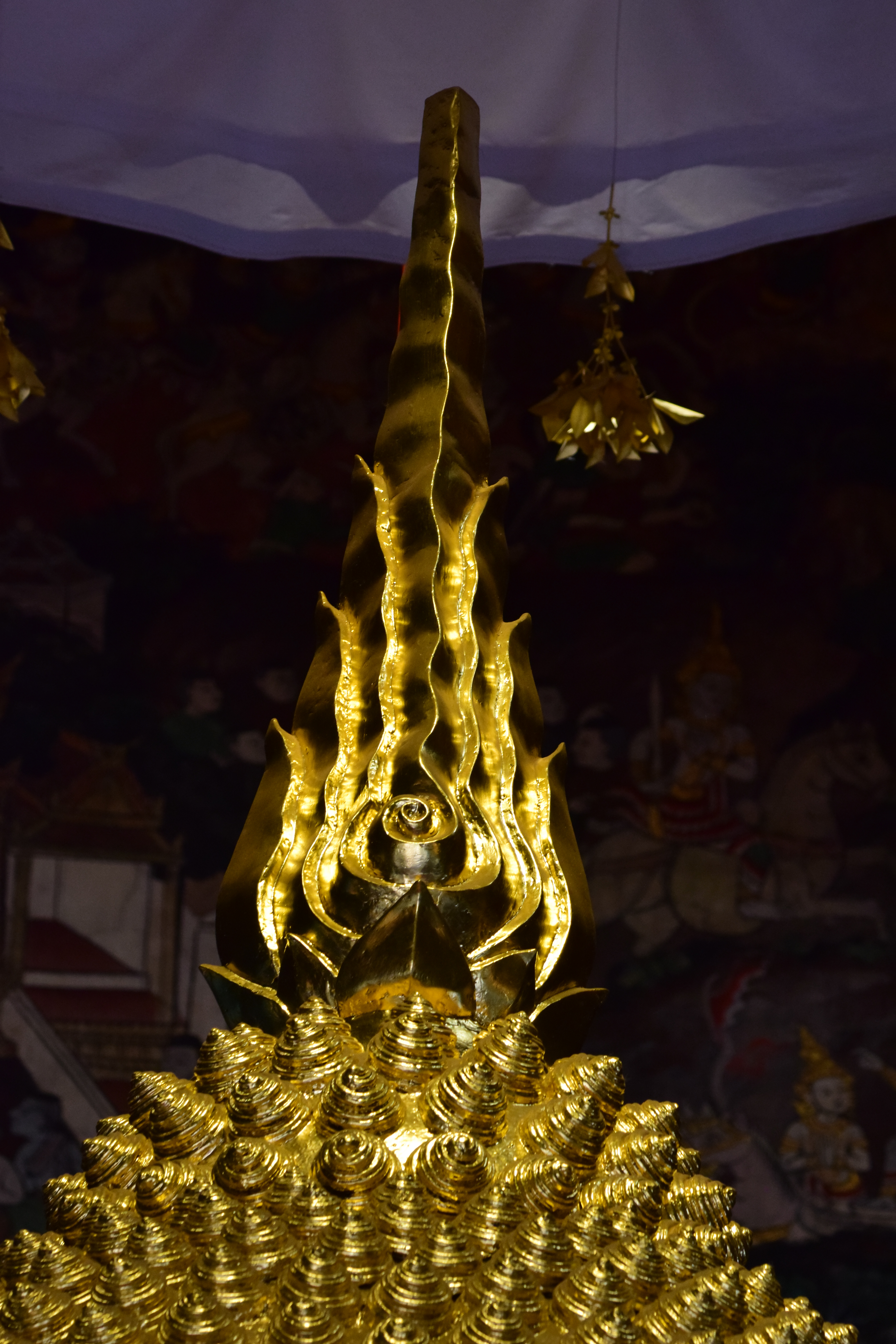
Ushnisha on top of the Phra Si Sakkayamuni Buddha statue in Wat Suthat Temple, Bangkok, Thailand

The ushnisha (Sanskrit: उष्णीष, romanized: uṣṇīṣa, Pali: uṇhīsa) is a protuberance on top of the head of a Buddha. In Buddhist literature, it is sometimes said to represent the "crown" of a Buddha, a symbol of Enlightenment and status the King of the Dharma.

== Description ==
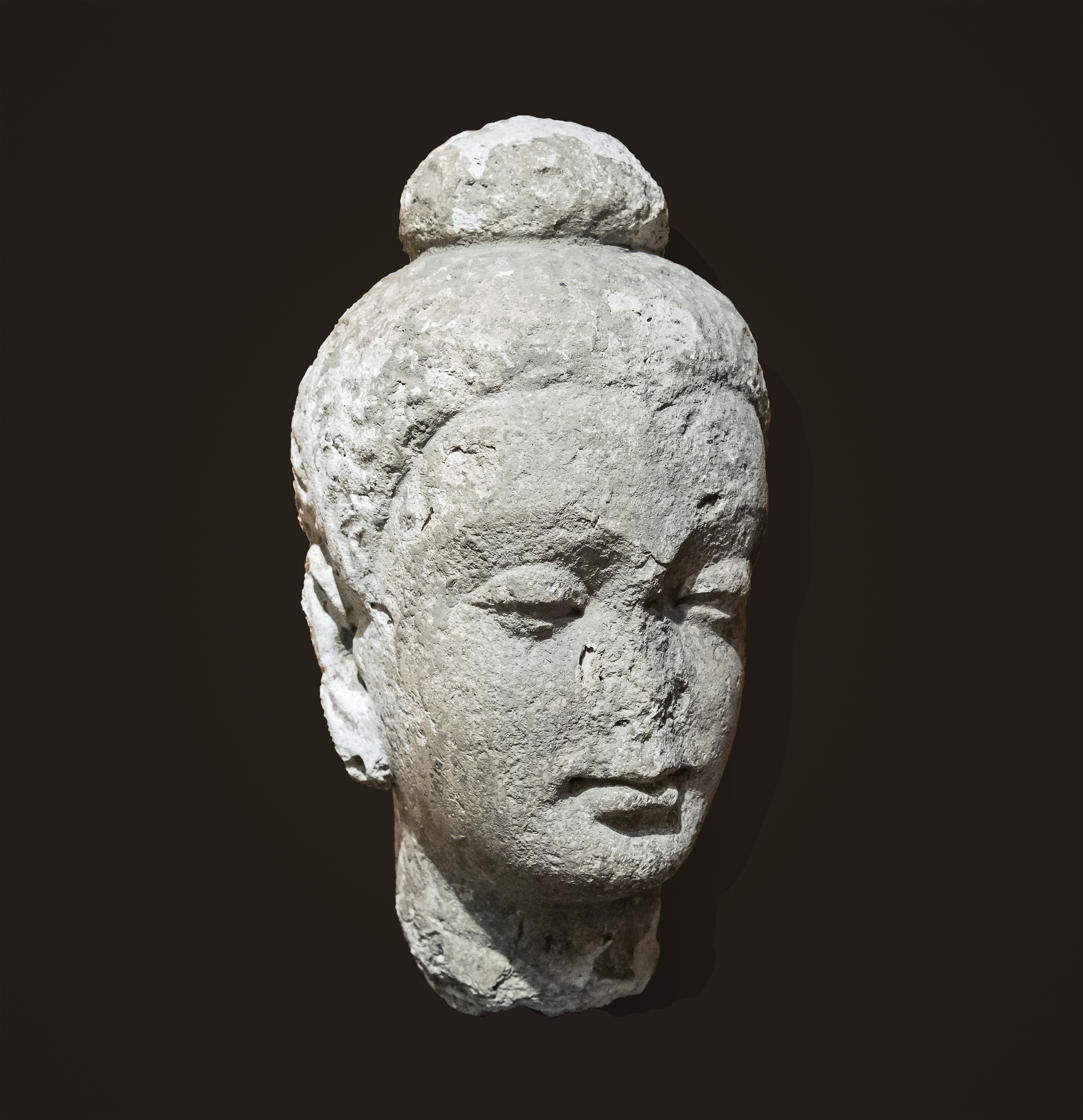
Head of the Buddha, crowned by the ushnisha, 3rd century, Hadda, Afghanistan

The Ushnisha is the thirty-second of the 32 major marks of the Buddha, wherein the Buddha is said to have a fleshy or cranial protuberance at the top of his head. It is sometimes elaborated that it is covered with hair that curls to the right.

In art of Southeast Asia, a flame is sometimes added that ascends from the middle of this protuberance.

== Representation ==
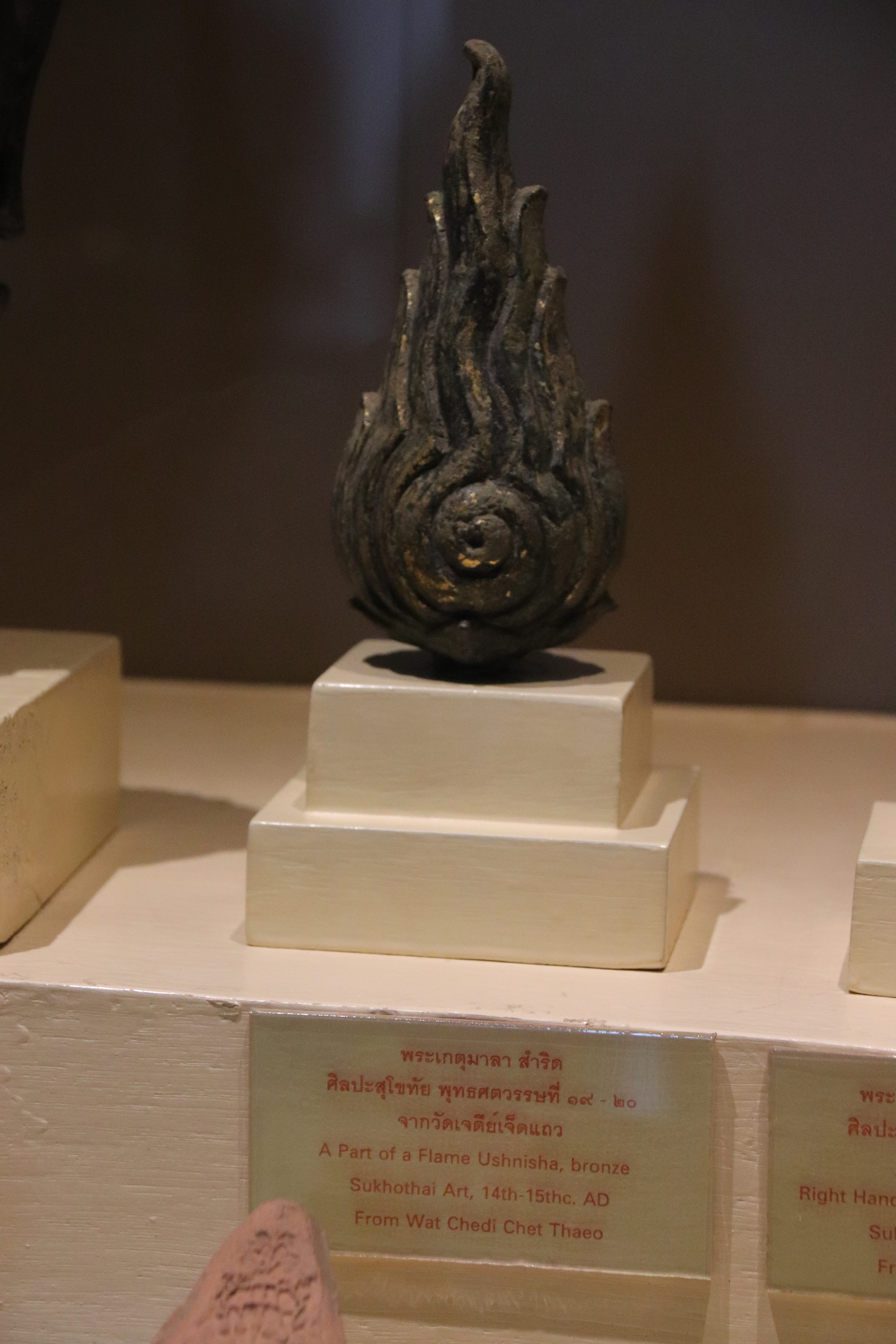
Flame Ushnisha, 14–15 century, Sukhothai, Thailand

Buddhist art from Gandhara in the 1st century CE often represent the Buddha with a topknot, rather than just a cranial knob. It is thought that the interpretation of the ushnisha as a supernatural cranial protuberance happened at a later date, as the representation of the topknot became more symbolic and its original meaning was lost.

== Origins ==
The portrayal of Śākyamuni Buddha with an ushnisha has varied throughout history and varied by school. The Sri Lankan Tamrashatiya school, which would later give rise to Theravada, portrayed him as bald and having an ushnisha extending into the sky, beyond the possibility of measurement. The Gandharan school of Buddhism, sometimes portrayed Śākyamuni sporting a cluster of long wavy hair or curls as a topknot concealing the ushnisha.

=== The Bodhisattva-Cakravartin ===
The Mahāvastu (1.259f) and the Divyāvadāna, as well as the Theravadin Milindapañha, describe some marks of the cakravartin, an idealised world-ruler, as consisting of an uṣṇīṣa or turban, a parasol, a "horn jewel" or vajra, a whisk and sandals. These were also marks of a kshatriya.

The art of early Mahayana Buddhism in Mathura presents bodhisattvas in a form called uṣṇīṣin "wearing a turban/hair binding", along with mudras that represent the nonviolent rule of a cakracartin.

=== Possible Indus Valley origins ===
A bull figurine excavated from Lakhan-jo-Daro from the Bronze Age Indus Valley Civilization has a similar ushnisha-like knob above its head. This is a unique feature which may indicate a visual portrayal of intelligence.

== Mahāyāna ==
The uṣṇīṣa seems to be one of the most valued of all a Buddha’s thirty-two marks. The Ratnamegha Sūtra provides a list of meritorious qualities of a Buddha’s body, starting with his hair follicles, the first twenty-nine marks in general, the urṇa, and finally the uṣṇīṣa, which is only surpassed by the Buddha’s voice.

The Bhadrakalpika Sūtra lists six qualities of the uṣṇīṣa that accord with the Buddha’s six perfections he accomplished as bodhisattva:

"What are the bodhisattvas’ six perfections that bring about his possessing the uṣṇīṣa on his head? As the ripening of the perfection of generosity it is a deep blue coil. As the ripening of discipline, it coils to the right. As the ripening of patience it is untouched by dust. As the ripening of diligence its summit cannot be seen. As the ripening of concentration it is an object of constant gaze. As the ripening of the perfection of insight it is unaffected by rain or wind. It is in these ways that the six perfections of the bodhisattvas bring about his possessing the uṣṇīṣa on his head."

As stated above, one quality of the uṣṇīṣa is that it cannot be seen from above. The common rendering of this in Sanskrit is “anavalokitamūrdhatā” (lit. “the top of the head is not looked upon”).

The Tathāgatācintyaguhyanirdeśa Sūtra contains a story of a bodhisattva who came from another buddha land to worship Śākyamuni. Using his supernatural powers, he flew upward past several more buddha lands and was unable to reach the top of the uṣṇīṣa.

The Pali tradition seems to recognize this trope as well, apparent in the Commentary on the Suttanipāta and the Commentary on the Hemavata Sutta. According to these texts, there was an episode when the yakṣas Sātāgiri and Hemavata were traveling in the sky to an assembly of yakṣas. They were forced to stop full flight and land, because they had encountered the space that would have otherwise placed them directly above the Buddha’s head.

When the light that issues forth from a Buddha’s mouth returns to his uṣṇīṣa, it is a sign that he will give a prophecy of the eventual Buddhahood of someone in the audience.

== See also ==
- Buddhoṣṇīṣa
- Urna
- Sahasrara
- Sitātapatra
- Uṣṇīṣavijayā
- Uṣṇīṣa Vijaya Dhāraṇī Sūtra: ऊष्णीष विजय ढारणी – via Wikisource.
- Classes of Tantra in Tibetan Buddhism, the crown-protrusion mentioned in is this same upper-brain-blossoming/development, simply with a different label.
