= Namgyal Monastery =

Tibetan Buddhist monastery in Dharamsala, Himachal Pradesh, India

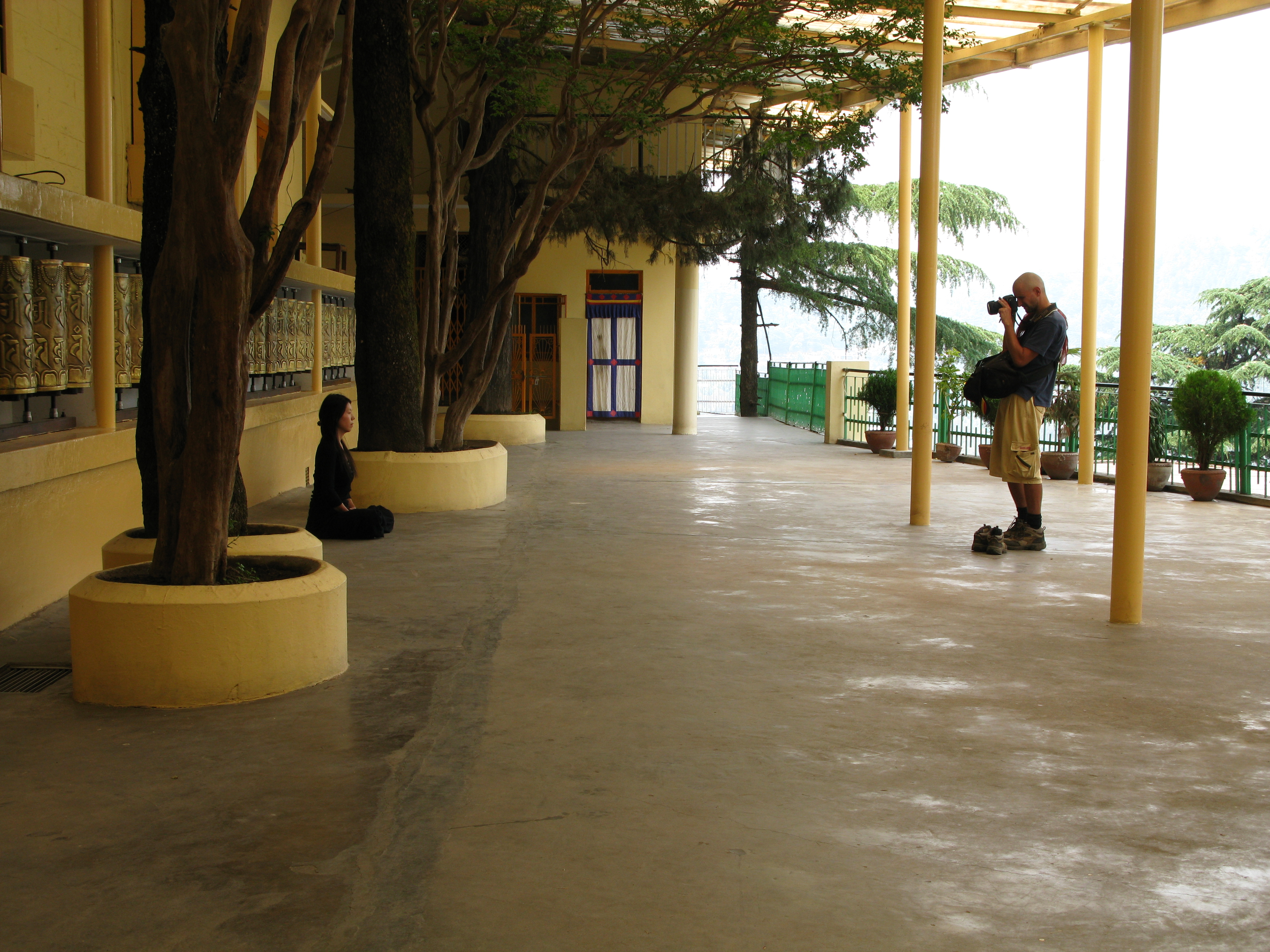

- Location within India

Religion
- Affiliation: Tibetan Buddhism

Location
- Location: McLeod Ganj, Dharamsala, India
- Country: India
- Coordinates: 32.232521°N 76.324395°E

Architecture
- Established: 1564; 462 years ago

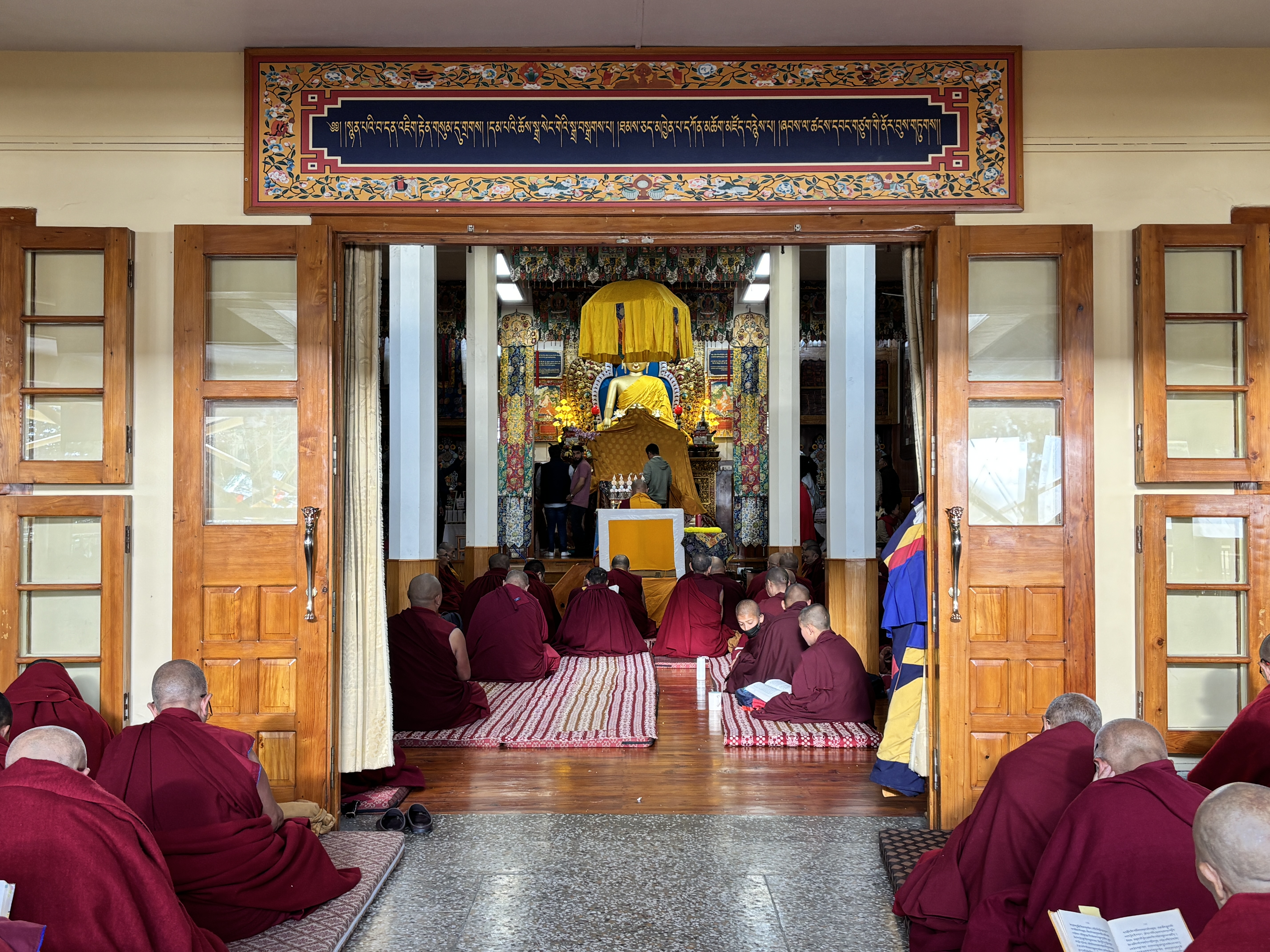
Monks chanting prayers at Namgyal Monastery

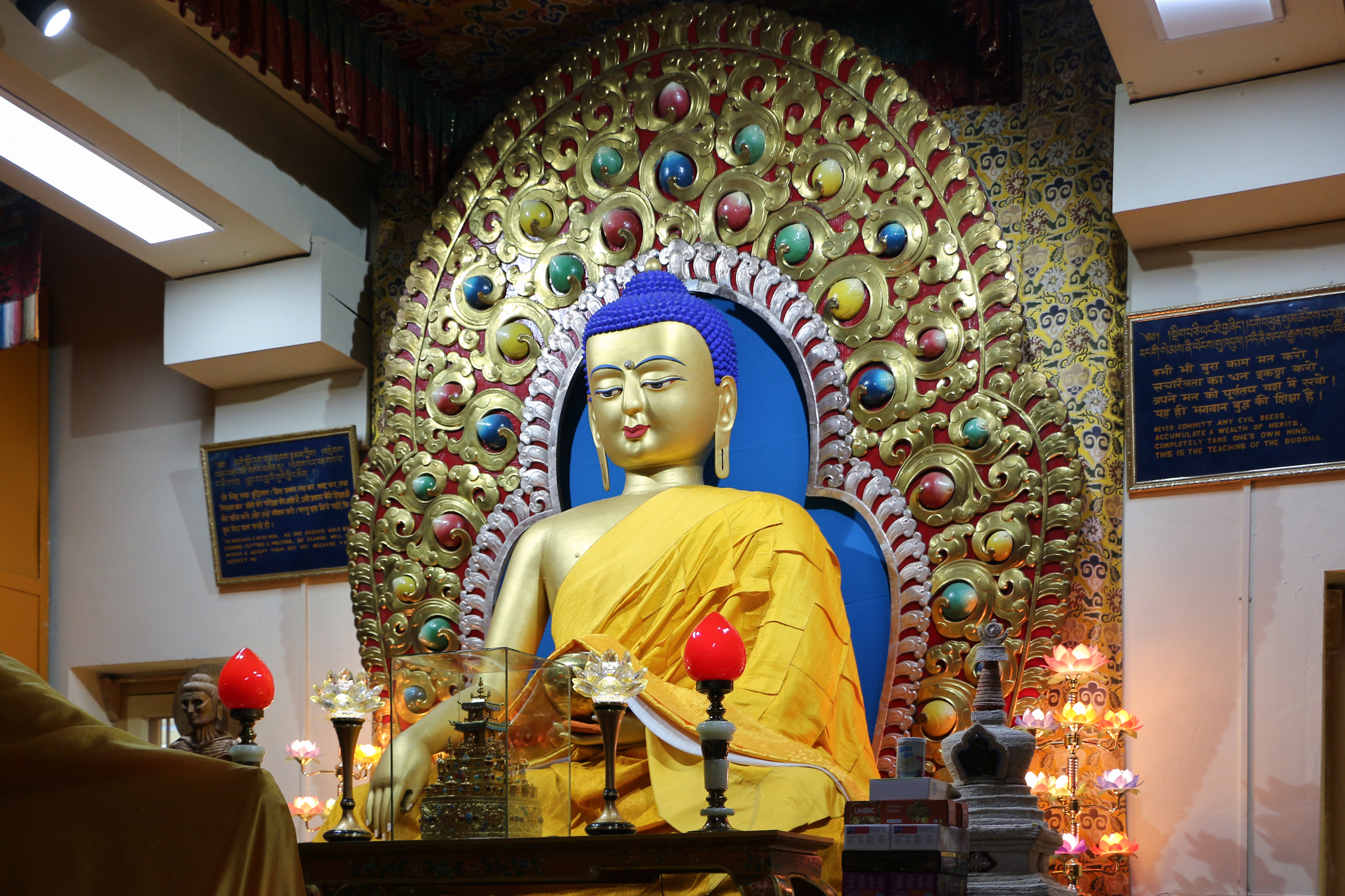
Statue of the Buddha in Namgyal Monastery

Namgyal Monastery (Tibetan: རྣམ་རྒྱལ།, Wylie: rnam rgyal) (also often referred to as "Dalai Lama's Temple") is located in Mcleod Ganj, Dharamsala, India. It is the personal monastery of the 14th Dalai Lama. Another name for this temple-complex is Namgyal Tantric College.

The monastery's key role is to assist with rituals involving the Dalai Lama of Tibet. Its main tantric practices reportedly include those of Kalachakra, Yamantaka, Chakrasamvara, Guhyasamaja, and Vajrakilaya.

== Early years ==
Founded in either 1564 or 1565 as Phende Lekshe Ling (on the foundations of the since defunct monastery called Phende Gon) by the second Dalai Lam Gendun Gyatso, Namgyal Monastery was renamed in honour of the female long-life deity Namgyälma in 1571.

Since the completion of construction on the Potala Palace (begun by the Fifth Dalai Lama), Namgyal was traditionally housed in the red section at the top of that building in Lhasa.

== Since 1959 ==
Following the Tibetan uprising of 1959, Namgyal Monastery relocated to Dharamshala, India, where it continues, active, to this day. According to Namgyal's website, Namgyal (Dharamshala) has "nearly 200" monks (up from 55 in 1959), representing all four main Tibetan monastic lineages.

In 1992, on the advice of the present Dalai Lama, Namgyal established an American branch in Ithaca, New York, including within it the Namgyal Monastery Institute of Buddhist Studies. On 8 February 1996, the monks of Namgyal Monastery's Institute of Buddhist Studies offered their first "Blessing of Cyberspace" as part of the "Twenty-four Hours in Cyberspace" event.

In 1998, Namgyal incorporated a Tibetan monastery in Bodhgaya, India, called Gendhen Phelgyeling. That monastery is now known as Namgyal (Bodhgaya), and has 45 monks.

Namgyal (Dharamsala) also manages a temple in Kushinagar (since 1967), and an elderly home in Simla (since 1992).

Whether the People's Republic of China has maintained an institution with the same name inside Tibet is unclear.

== See also ==
- Dalai Lama lineage
- Third Dalai Lama: founder of Namgyal Monastery
- Fifth Dalai Lama: builder of the Potala
- Fourteenth Dalai Lama: current Dalai Lama
- Losang Samten: contemporary historian of Namgyal Monastery
