= Uṣṇīṣa Vijaya Dhāraṇī =

Dharani Sutra in Mahāyāna Buddhism

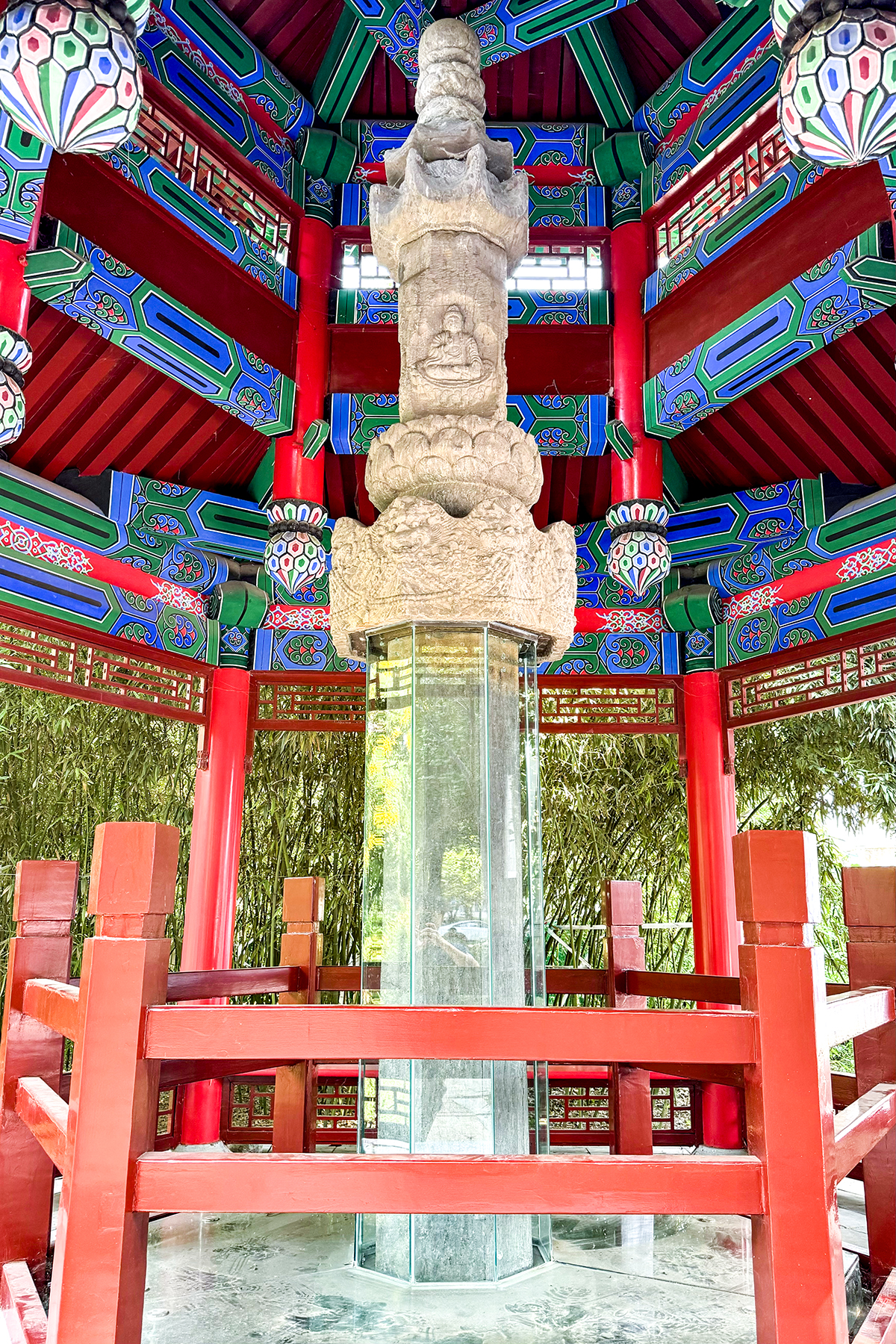
Stone Pillar of the Dhāraṇī inscription. This Dhāraṇī is commonly used for its protective and talismanic properties

The Uṣṇīṣa Vijaya Dhāraṇī (Sanskrit IAST; English: Dhāraṇī of the Victorious Uṣṇīṣa, Chinese: 佛頂尊勝陀羅尼經; Pinyin: Fódǐng Zūnshèng Tuóluóní Jīng; Rōmaji: Butsuchō Sonshō Darani Kyō; Vietnamese: Kinh Phật Đảnh Tôn Thắng Đà La Ni) is a Dhāraṇī (a Buddhist mantric chant, incantation or magical spell) which is popular throughout Mahayana Buddhism. The Uṣṇīṣa Vijaya Dhāraṇī is considered a magical incantation in Mahayana Buddhism and esoteric sects of Theravada, seen having the power to destroying delusions, prevent lower rebirths, promoting long life, and promoting rebirth in the pure land of Sukhavati.

The dhāraṇī is found in various translations and sources, including in the Uṣṇīṣa Vijaya Dhāraṇī Sūtra, an Indian Mahāyāna Sūtra, specifically a Dhāraṇī Sūtra. The Dhāraṇī is also personified as a goddess called Uṣṇīṣavijaya, a female Buddhist deity associated with the Buddha's Uṣṇīṣa (a magical topknot or supernatural dome on top of the Buddha's head).

== Uṣṇīṣa Vijaya Dhāraṇī Sūtra ==
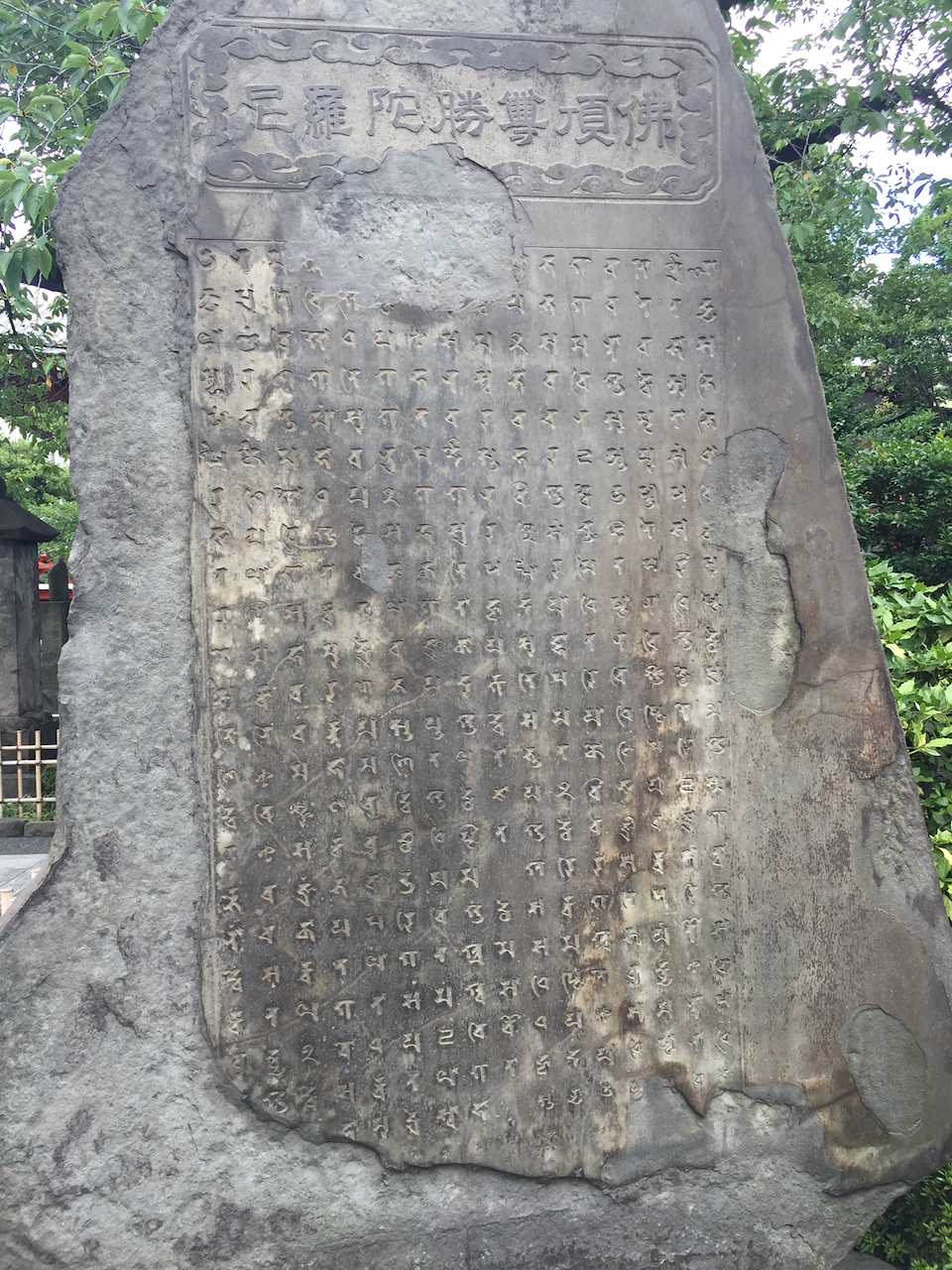
A stone inscription of the Usnisa Vijaya Dharani Sutra at Asakusa Temple in Tokyo. Note the use of Sanskrit Siddhaṃ script.

The sūtra was translated a total of eight times from Sanskrit to Chinese between 679 and 988 CE. According to one scholar of Esoteric Buddhism (Sorensen), it was the most important esoteric sutra translated in China in the seventh century. The sutra gained wide circulation in China, and its practices have been utilized since the Tang dynasty, from which it then spread to the rest of East Asia. It was also popular in Dunhuang and Tibetan Buddhism. An alternate longer Sanskrit title for the sūtra is the Sarvadurgatipariśodhana Uṣṇīṣa Vijaya Dhāraṇī Sūtra.

In Chinese Buddhism, the Uṣṇīṣa Vijaya dhāraṇī is associated with Mount Wutai, which in the Chinese Buddhist tradition is considered the bodhimaṇḍa of the bodhisattva Mañjuśrī. Sacred stone tablets with the Uṣṇīṣa Vijaya Dhāraṇī carved into them have been distributed widely in some regions of the Far East. The dhāraṇī is still widely used in various rituals that involve esoteric or tantric elements.

In Tibetan Buddhism, the dhāraṇī, often alternatively entitled the Namgyälma mantra, is considered to be one of the five powerful purifying mantras and is sometimes used in rituals for the deceased.

In Nepalese Newar Buddhism, Uṣṇīṣavijayā dhāraṇī rites are still important and are widely performed.

=== Contents ===
The purpose of this sūtra is said to be to help sentient beings in a troubled and tumultuous world. According to this sūtra, beings will leave suffering and obtain happiness, increase in prosperity and longevity, remove karmic obstacles, eliminate disasters and calamities, remove enmity and hatred, fulfill all wishes, and quickly be led onto the Buddha's way.

It is held by some that when the dhāraṇī is heard, it can imbue the alaya consciousness with pure seeds that will help lead one to buddhahood. This mantra is also associated with Green Tara.

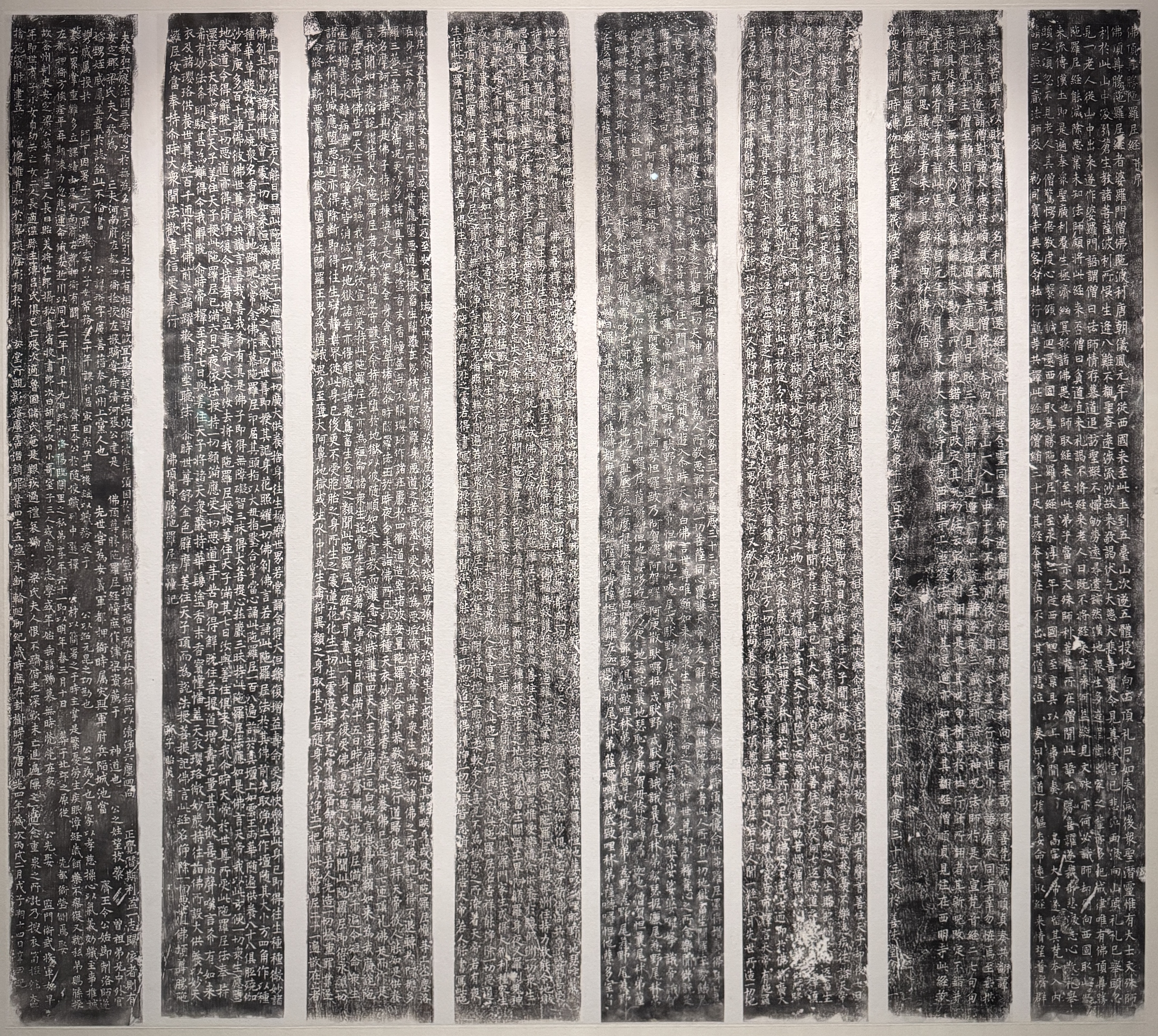
Rubbing from pillar carved with the Uṣṇīṣa Vijaya Dhāraṇī Sutra - Later Tang Dynasty - 4th year Tongguang Reign (926)

According to the text, major applications of this dhāraṇī include:

- Destroy calamities and rescue those in difficulties
- Eliminate offenses and create good deeds
- Purify all karmic obstructions
- Increase blessings and lengthen lifespan
- Attain anuttarā-samyak-saṃbodhi
- Relieve beings in the ghost realm
- Benefit birds, animals and all crawling creatures
- Increase wisdom
- Revert the fixed karma
- Eliminate various illness
- Destroy hells
- Ensure the safety of the households, and having children to inherit the family pride
- Harmonise husbands and wives
- Be able to reborn in Sukhavati or other pure lands
- Heal sickness inflicted by pretas
- Request for rain, etc.

Some quotes from the sutra text include:

Lord of Heaven, if someone hears this Dharani even for just a moment, he will not undergo karmic retribution from the evil karma and severe hindrances accumulated from thousands of kalpas ago, that would otherwise cause him to revolve in the cycles of birth and death - in all kinds of life forms in the evil paths - hell, hungry ghost, animal, realm of King Yama, Asuras, Yaksa, Raksasa, ghosts and spirits, Putana, Kataputana, Apasmara, mosquitoes, gnats, tortoises, dogs, pythons, birds, ferocious animals, crawling creatures and even ants and other life forms. Owing to the merits accrued from hearing for a moment this Dharani, once this very life is over, he will be reborn in the Buddhalands, together with all the Buddhas and Ekajati-pratibaddha Bodhisattvas, or in a distinguished Brahmin or Ksatriya family, or in some other wealthy and reputable family. Lord of Heaven, this man can be reborn in one of the above-mentioned prosperous and reputable families simply because he has heard this Dharani, and hence be reborn in a pure place.

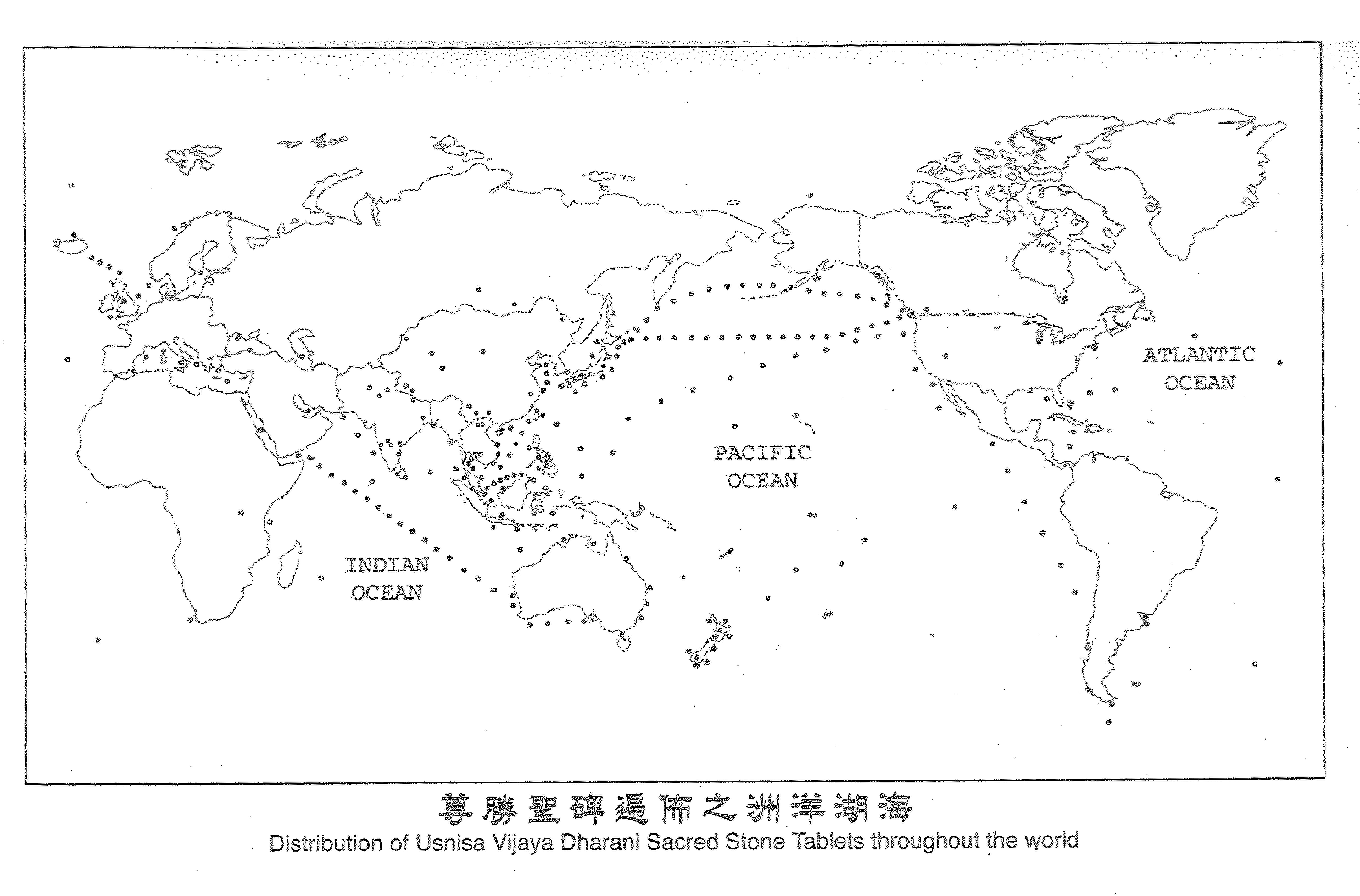
Distribution of Uṣṇīṣa Vijaya Dhāraṇī Sacred Stone Tablets Throughout The World (1993–2007) by Usnisa Vijaya Dharani Chanting Group.

=== Synopsis ===
According to the Sūtra a devaputra by the name of Suṣṭhita (Supratiṣṭhita) was enjoying the supremely wonderful bliss of heavenly life, but then he suddenly heard a voice in space saying,

Devaputra Susthita, you have only seven days left to live. After death, you will be reborn in Jambudvīpa (Earth) as an animal for seven successive lives. Then you will fall into the hells to undergo more sufferings. Only after fulfilling your kārmic retribution will you be reborn in the human realm, but to a humble and destitute family; while in the mother’s womb you will be without eyes and be born blind.

On hearing this, Devaputra Suṣṭhita was so terrified and rushed over to the Heavenly Palace of Lord Śakra. Bursting into tears, he prostrated himself and revealed what had happened to Lord Śakra. Lord Śakra immediately calmed his mind and entered into samādhi. Instantly, he saw that Suṣṭhita would undergo seven successive lives in the forms of a pig, dog, jackal, monkey, python, crow and vulture, all feeding on filth and putrescence. Lord Śakra could not think of any way to help Suṣṭhita. He felt that only the Tathāgata, Arhat, Samyaksambuddha could save Suṣṭhita from falling into the great suffering of the evil destinies.

Soon after nightfall, Lord Śakra made preparations and headed to the garden of Anāthapiṇḍada. Upon arrival, Lord Śakra prostrated himself at the Buddha's feet, and circumambulated the Buddha seven times clockwise in worship, before laying out his great Pūjā (offerings/obeisances). Kneeling in front of the Buddha, Lord Śakra described the future destiny of Devaputra Suṣṭhita.

Instantly, the uṣṇīṣa (crown of the head) of the Tathāgata radiated multiple rays of light, illuminating the world in all ten directions before returning to the top of the Buddha's head. The Buddha smiled and said to Lord Śakra, “Lord of Heaven, there is a Dhāraṇī known as the Uṣṇīṣa Vijaya Dhāraṇī. It can purify all evil paths, eliminate all sufferings of beings in the realms of hell, King Yama and animals, destroy all the hells, and transfer sentient beings onto the virtuous path.”

After hearing this, Lord Śakra appealed to the Buddha to give a discourse on this great Dhāraṇī. The Buddha, aware of Lord Śakra's intention and his eagerness to hear His discourse of this Dhāraṇī, immediately proclaimed the Mantra. Then the Buddha told Lord Śakra, “The Mantra is known as the ‘Purifying All Evil Path Uṣṇīṣa Vijaya Dhāraṇī’. It can eliminate all evil karmic hindrances and eradicate the suffering of all evil paths.” Again the Buddha told Lord Śakra that this great Dhāraṇī is proclaimed together by Buddhas as numerous as grains of sand in eighty-eight koṭis (hundred million) Ganges Rivers. All Buddhas rejoice and uphold this Dhāraṇī that is verified by the wisdom seal of Vairocana Tathāgata.

Again the Buddha reminded Lord Śakra to transmit it to Devaputra Suṣṭhita and that he himself should receive and uphold it, recite, contemplate and treasure it, memorize and preserve it. He preached that this Dhāraṇī should be widely proclaimed to all beings in Jambudvīpa and entrusted him to this task for the benefit of all heavenly beings. The Buddha also reminded Lord Śakra that he should diligently uphold and protect it, and never allow it to be forgotten or lost.

After Lord Śakra received this Dhāraṇī practice from the Buddha, he returned to his heavenly palace to convey it to Devaputra Suṣṭhita. Having received this Dhāraṇī, Devaputra Suṣṭhita kept the practice as instructed for six days and six nights, after which all his wishes were completely fulfilled.

When seven days had passed, Lord Śakra and Devaputra Suṣṭhita, together with other heavenly beings, respectfully approached the Buddha and presented their grand offerings. Once they had respectfully circumambulated the Buddha a hundred thousand times and paid homage, then happily took their seats and listened to the Buddha preach the Dharma.

The World Honoured One then extended his golden arm and touched Devaputra Suṣṭhita on the head to bestow a prediction of Devaputra Suṣṭhita's attainment of Bodhi.

== Dhāraṇī text ==
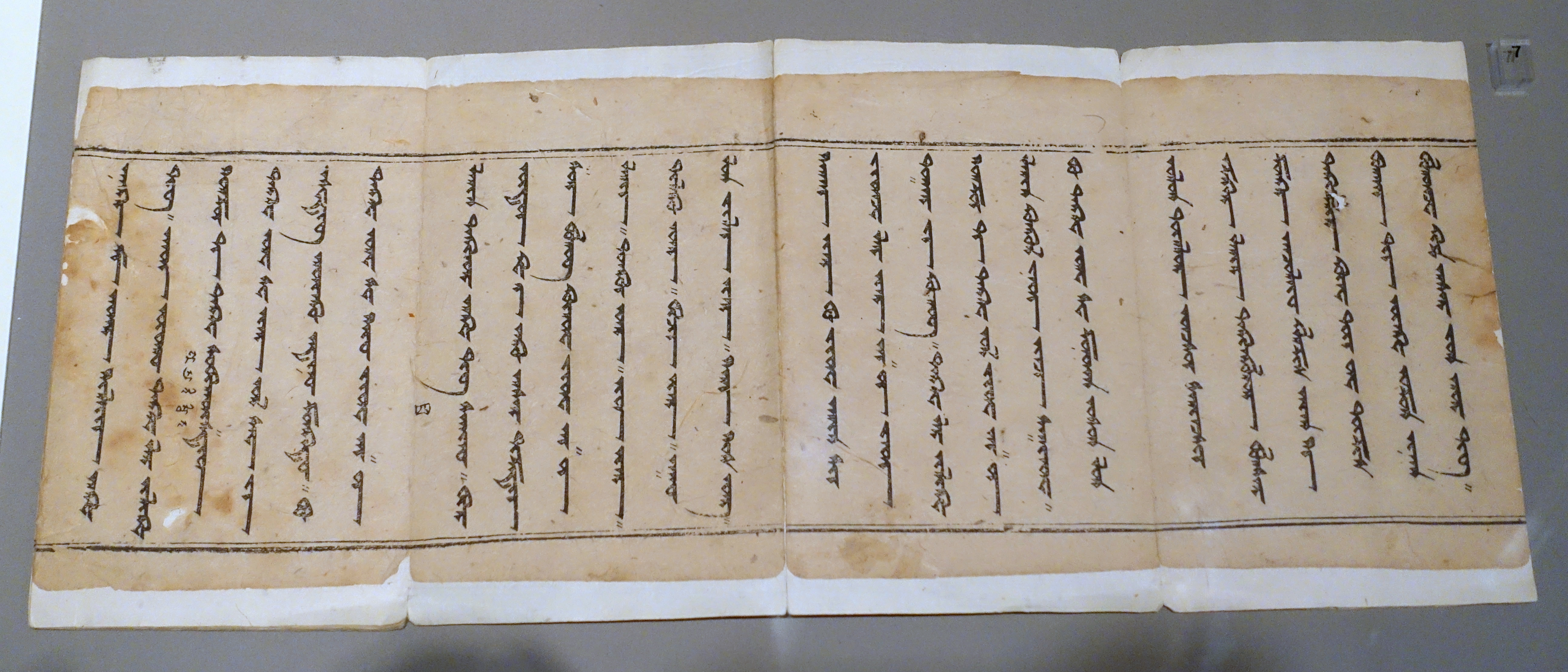
A copy of the dhāraṇī sutra in Old Turkic, Uighur script, with comments in Brahmi, Murtuk, 13th-14th century.

=== Tang China edition ===
The most popular and widespread edition was the one found in the Sūtra on the Superlative Dhāraṇī of the Buddha’s Crown (Foding zunsheng tuoluoni jing 佛頂尊勝陀羅尼經, T 967), translated by *Buddhapālita (Fotuoboli 佛陁波利, fl. late seventh century) a learned scholar monk from Kaśmir. This edition of the dhāraṇī became highly influential, with a significant number of stone and mortuary pillars in China engraved with its text.

The Uṣṇīṣavijayā-dhāraṇī was initially brought to China in the late sixth century, with additional Sanskrit manuscripts arriving during the seventh century. A series of translations were produced in the late 670s and 680s, motivated in part by attempts to address the health issues of Emperor Gaozong. Notable translators included Divākara and Yijing, with Buddhapālita's translation becoming the most iconic. His version’s popularity is often attributed to a legend where he met the Bodhisattva Mañjuśrī disguised as an old man on Mt. Wutai, who urged him to bring the Sanskrit text to China. This narrative, depicted in Dunhuang murals, contributed to the widespread use of Buddhapālita’s version on dhāraṇī-pillars across China.

The Chinese phonetic transcription of the dhāraṇī is:

曩謨 (一) 婆誐嚩帝 (二) 怛喇 (二合) 路枳也 (三二合) 鉢 囉底 (四) 尾始瑟吒 (二合) 野 (五) 沒馱野 (六) 婆誐縛帝 (七) 怛儞也 (二合) 他 (八) 唵 (九) 尾戌馱野 (十) 娑麼娑麼 三滿哆 (十一) 嚩婆娑 (十二) 娑頗 (二合) 囉拏 (十三) 蘖 帝誐賀曩 (十四) 娑嚩 (二合) 婆嚩尾 秫 弟 (十五) 阿鼻 詵左覩 [牟*含] (十六) 素蘖哆 (十七) 嚩囉嚩左曩 (十八) 阿 蜜 㗚 (二合) 哆 (十九) 鼻矖罽 (二十) 摩賀曼怛囉 (二合) 橎乃 (二十一) 阿賀囉阿賀囉 (二十二) 阿庾散馱囉柅 (二十 三) 戌馱野戌馱野 (二十四) 誐誐曩尾 秫 弟 (二十五) 鄔瑟 膩灑 (二十六) 尾惹野尾 秫 弟 (二十七) 娑賀娑囉 (二十八二合) 囉濕銘 (二十九二合) 散 [口*祖] 儞帝 (三十) 薩嚩怛他蘖哆 (三十 一) 嚩路迦 [寧*頁] (三十二) 殺橎 (引) 囉弭哆 (三十三) 跛哩布囉 抳 (三十四) 薩嚩怛他 (引) 蘖哆 (三十五) 紇哩 (二合) 娜野 (三十 六) 地瑟姹 (二合) 曩 (三十七) 地瑟耻 (二合) 跢 (三十八) 摩賀 母捺哩 (三十九二合) 嚩日囉 (二合) 迦野 (四十) 僧賀跢曩 尾 秫 弟 (四十一) 薩嚩嚩囉拏 (四十二) 跛野訥蘖帝 (四十三) 跛哩尾 秫 弟 (四十四) 鉢囉 (二合) 底 (四十五) [寧*頁] 襪 跢野 (四十 六) 阿欲 秫 弟 (四十七) 三摩野 (四十八) 地瑟耻 (二合) 帝 (四十 九) 麼柅麼柅 (五十) 摩賀麼柅 (五十一) 怛闥哆 (五十二) 部 跢句致 (五十三) 跛哩 秫 弟 (五十四) 尾窣普 (二合) 吒 (五十五) 沒地 秫 弟 (五十六) 惹野惹野 (五十七) 尾惹野尾惹野 (五十 八) 娑麼囉 (五十九) 薩嚩沒馱 (六十) 地瑟耻 (二合) 哆 秫 弟 (六十一) 嚩日哩 (二合) 嚩日囉 (二合) 蘖陛 (六十二) 嚩日囕 (六十三二合) 婆嚩覩麼麼 (六十四稱名) 舍哩囕 (六十五) 薩嚩 薩怛嚩 (六十六二合) 難 (上) 左迦野 (六十七) 尾 秫 弟 (六十八) 薩 嚩誐帝 (六十九) 跛哩 秫 弟 (七十) 薩嚩怛他蘖哆 (七十一) 三麼濕嚩 (二合) 娑演覩 (七十二) 薩嚩怛他蘖哆 (七十三) 三麼濕嚩 (二合) 娑 (七十四) 地瑟耻 (二合) 帝 (七十五) 沒地 野沒地野 (七十六) 尾沒地野 (七十七) 冒馱野冒馱野 (七十 八) 尾冒馱野尾冒馱野 (七十九) 三滿哆 (八十) 跛哩 秫 弟 (八十一) 薩嚩怛他蘖哆 (八十二) 紇哩 (二合) 娜野 (八十三) 地瑟姹 (二合) 曩 (八十四) 地瑟耻 (二合) 哆 (八十五) 摩賀母捺 [口*(隸-木+士)] (二合) 娑嚩 (二合) 賀

The Sanskrit version in IAST is:

namo bhagavate trailokya prativiśiṣṭāya buddhāya bhagavate tadyathā oṃ viśodhaya viśodhaya samasama samanta avabhāsa spharaṇa gati gahana svabhāva viśuddhe abhiṣiñcatu māṃ sugata vara vacana amṛta abhiṣeke mahāmantra pāne āhara āhara āyuḥ sandhāraṇi śodhaya śodhaya gagana viśuddhe uṣṇīṣa vijaya viśuddhe sahasraraśmi sañcodite sarva tathāgata avalokana ṣaṭpāramitā paripūraṇi sarva tathāgata mati daśa-bhūmi prati-ṣṭhite sarva tathāgata hṛdaya adhiṣṭhāna adhiṣṭhita mahāmudre vajrakāya saharaṇa viśuddhe sarva āvaraṇa apāya durgati pariviśuddhe pratinirvartaya āyuḥ śuddhe samaya adhiṣṭhite maṇi maṇi mahāmaṇi tathātā bhūta koṭi pariśuddhe visphuṭa buddhi śuddhe jaya jaya vijaya vijaya smara smara sarva buddha adhiṣṭhita śuddhe vajre vajra garbhe vajraṃ bhavatu mama śarīraṁ sarva sattvānāṁ ca kāya pariviśuddhe sarva gati pariśuddhe sarva tathāgatāśca me sama āśvāsayantu sarva tathāgata sama āśvāsa adhiṣṭhite budhya budhya vibudhya vibudhya bodhaya bodhaya vibodhaya vibodhaya samanta pariśuddhe sarva tathāgata hṛdaya adhiṣṭhāna adhiṣṭhita mahāmudre svāhā

English:

Homage to the Blessed One, the Buddha, who is exalted above the three worlds. Thus it is: Oṃ Purify, purify. The unequalled, the all-pervading, the illuminating, the pervading, the profound, the nature, the purified. Consecrate me with the nectar of the excellent words of the Sugata (Well-Gone One), in the ceremony of the immortal anointment. Bring forth, bring forth the elixir of the great mantra, sustaining life. Purify, purify, O one pure like the sky. O pure Victorious Uṣṇīṣa. Activated by the thousand rays of light. Behold the vision of all Tathāgatas, who fulfill the Six Perfections (Pāramitās). Established in the mind of all Tathāgatas and in the ten levels (bhūmis). Empowered by the heart of all Tathāgatas, the great seal (Mahāmudrā). With a body as strong as a vajra, by the power of the Mahāmudrā be purified from all obstacles, suffering, and unfortunate rebirths. Turn back (the causes of) death, purified in longevity, with the power of the vow. Jewel, Jewel, Great Jewel, the purified ultimate reality (tathatā), the peak of existence (bhūtakoṭi). O one with clear, pure wisdom. Victorious one, Victorious one, triumphant, triumphant, remember, remember. Purified by the sustaining power (adhiṣṭhita) of all Buddhas. O vajra, O essence of vajra, may my body and that of all beings be a vajra and be completely purified. May all paths (of rebirth) be purified. May all Tathāgatas give me equal comfort. Empowered by the equal comfort of all Tathāgatas. Awaken, awaken, be enlightened, be enlightened. Enlighten, enlighten, fully awaken, fully awaken. Perfectly pure in all respects. Empowered by the heart of all Tathāgatas, the great seal (Mahāmudrā). Svāhā ("Hail!" or "So be it!").

=== Mantra ===
In addition to the long dhāraṇī, there is the much shorter Uṣṇīṣa Vijaya heart-mantra: This mantra is used in Shingon Buddhism.

- oṃ amṛta-tejavati svāhā
- alternate: oṁ amṛta tejovati svāhā

== Uṣṇīṣavijayā as a goddess ==
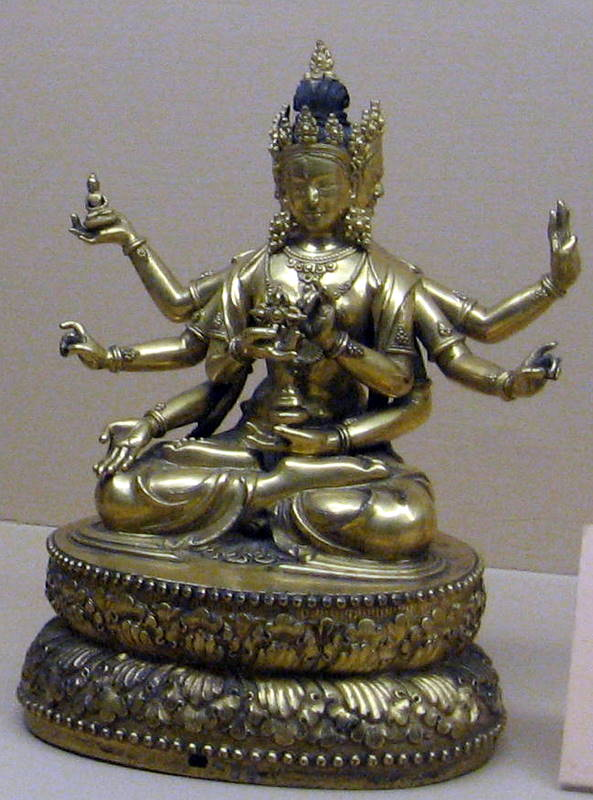
Usnisavijaya, Chhatrapati Shivaji Maharaj Vastu Sangrahalaya

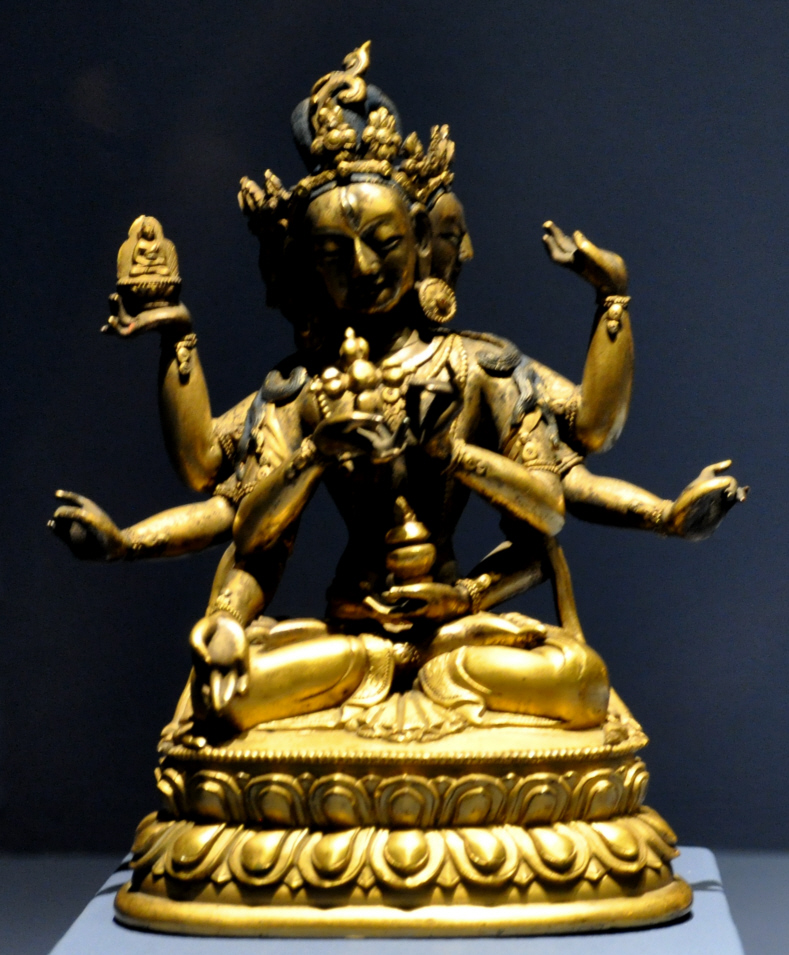
Sino-Tibetan Namgyälma statue from the 19th century; gilded bronze; Linden Museum, Stuttgart

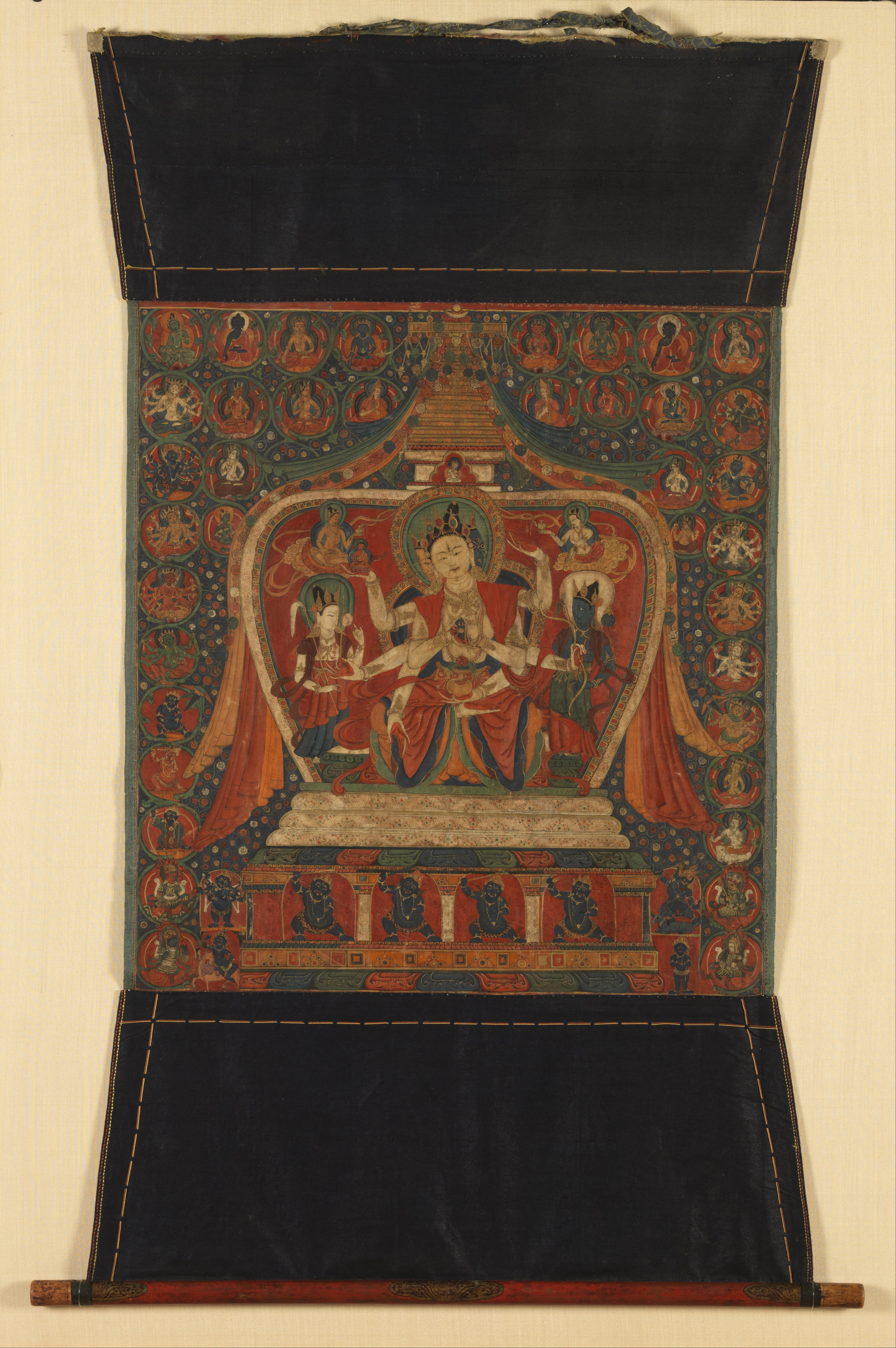
Uṣṇīṣavijayā in a stupa, 15th-century painting, Rubin Museum of Art

In Mahayana Buddhism, the Uṣṇīṣavijaya Dhāraṇī is personified as a female deity, called Uṣṇīṣavijayā ("Victorious Uṣṇīṣa"; Tibetan: གཙུག་གཏོར་རྣམ་རྒྱལ་མ།, Wylie: gtsug tor rnam rgyal ma, THL: Tsuktor Namgyelma; Chinese: 佛頂尊勝佛母), She is a prominent goddess in Mahayana and Vajrayana Buddhism. Her name, "Uṣṇīṣavijayā," translates to "Victorious One of the Uṣṇīṣa," referring to the topknot or cranial protuberance (uṣṇīṣa) that symbolizes spiritual attainment in Buddhist iconography. She is considered a manifestation of the Buddha's wisdom and an emanation of the uṣṇīṣa as a source of protective power. This goddess is associated with long life, purification of karma, and the eradication of suffering. With Amitayus and White Tara, she constitutes one of the three Buddhas of Long Life in Tibetan Buddhism, where she is known as Namgyälma. She is one of the more well-known Buddhist divinities in Nepal, Tibet, and Mongolia.

In Chinese Buddhism, Uṣṇīṣavijayā is known commonly as Zūnshèng Fómǔ (尊勝佛母). She is also a popular deity, and her dhāraṇī is widely used in both monasteries and lay Buddhist circles for ritual purposes, such as during the tantric Yujia Yankou rite where it is recited to empower food offerings. Her sūtra is frequently recited in ceremonies aimed at healing, protection, and exorcism. In Japan, she is known as Butchō Sonshō (仏頂尊勝), she is revered as a deity of protection and long life. The practice of her dhāraṇī was propagated by Japanese esoteric traditions such as Shingon Buddhism.

Since 1571, Namgyälma has been the namesake for Namgyal Monastery, the personal monastery of all the Dalai Lamas since its establishment by the Third Dalai Lama, Gyalwa Sonam Gyatso. Namgyälma is a female yidam, or meditational deity, and a long-life deity of the Kriya Tantra class in Tibetan Buddhism. She is typically depicted with a white frontal face, a yellow face on the right, and a blue face on the left. She is seated in a lotus posture, and has eight arms holding various symbolic ritual items in each of her hands.

== Ten doors ==
According to the Records of the Teaching of Uṣṇīṣa Vijaya Dhāraṇī Sūtra by Great Dharma Master Fa Chong (法崇, of the Tang dynasty), the great and unsurpassed merits of this Dharani can be categorised into ten doors as follows:

1. The door of taking refuge under the sages (歸敬尊德門)
2. The door of revealing the Dharma Body (章表法身門)
3. The door of purifying evil paths (淨除惡趣門)
4. The door of good and brightness initiation (善明灌頂門)
5. The door of spiritual power protection (神力加持門)
6. The door of lengthening the lifespan (壽命增長門)
7. The door of integrating concentration and wisdom (定慧相應門)
8. The door of Vajra offering (金剛供養門)
9. The door of universally attaining purity (普証清淨門)
10. The door of accomplishing Nirvana (成就涅架門)

== Theravada recension ==
The Theravada, Pali edition is referred to as the Uṇhissa Vijaya Sutta. It was distributed in pre-colonial Thailand and Laos as a canonical text, being unheard of in the Burmese and Lankan literary corpus with information about it located in the Wat Pho Manuscript as part of a wider text called the Paramatthamaṅgala. It contains much of the same information as the Mahayana version but is substantially younger.

== In popular culture ==
The beginning of this Dhāraṇī is chanted in the movie Fistful of Vengeance(about 46:20-47:30 min).

== See also ==
- Dharani pillar
