= Sand art =

Sand art may refer to:

- Sand art and play, e.g. Sculpturing "building sand castles"
- Sandpainting
- Sand drawing
- Sand mandalas, Buddhist sand paintings
- Sand animation: A type of stop motion animation, also a style of live performance art.
