= Andrew Clemens =

American sand artist

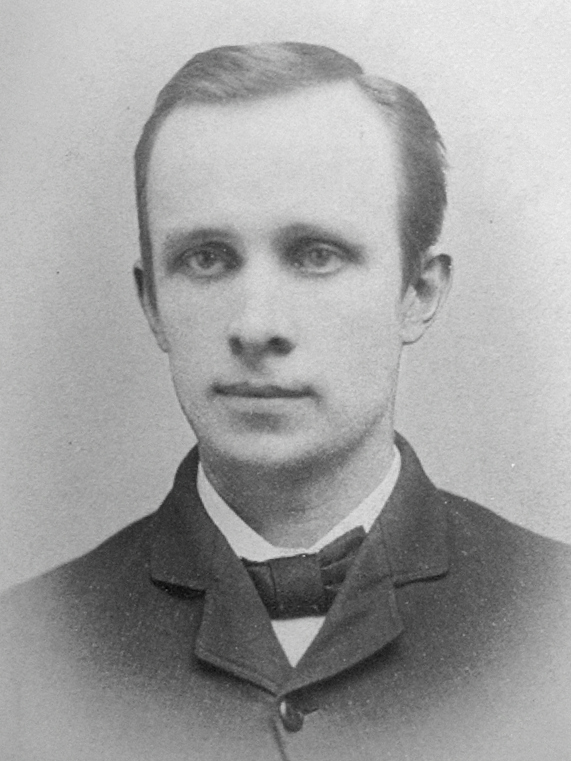
- Born: January 29, 1857; Dubuque, Iowa
- Died: May 12, 1894 (aged 37)
- Occupation: Sand artist
- Years active: 1874–1893
- Known for: The creation of colored sand bottles

Andrew Clemens (January 29, 1857 – May 12, 1894) was a sand artist from Iowa in the United States. Clemens formed his pictures by compressing natural colored sands inside chemists' jars to create his works of art.

== Early life ==
Andrew Clemens was born in Dubuque, Iowa, on January 29, 1857. He was the 3rd of 6 sons born to Johann and Margaretha Clemens who emigrated from Germany in 1851. The Clemens family moved to McGregor, Iowa, from Dubuque in 1857 a few months after Andrew was born.

At a young age, Andrew experienced "brain fever," likely meningitis, which caused his lifelong deafness. At the age of 13, Clemens was entered into the Iowa State School for the Deaf in Council Bluffs, Iowa.

== Art ==
Clemens' sandpainting career blossomed during his summer vacations from the State School, when he would spend time honing his craft. He would collect naturally colored grains of sand from an area in Pikes Peak State Park known as Pictured Rocks. At Pictured Rocks, the exposed portion of the sandstone in and near the Sand Cave is naturally colored by iron and mineral staining. He and his brothers would gather and collect sand from that area, take them home, sort them, dry, and grind samples into fine powder—which gave Andrew a rich palette for his designs.

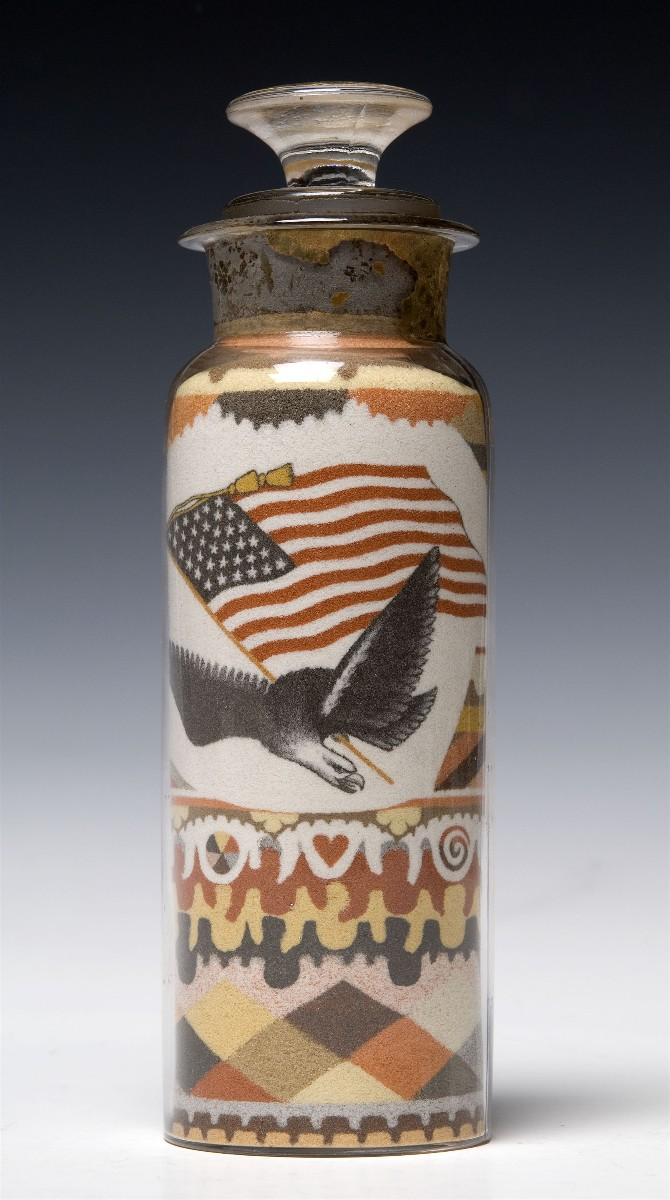
Sand bottle by Andrew Clemens, 1879

To create his art, he inserted the presorted grains of sand into small glass drug bottles using homemade tools formed out of hickory sticks. His process utilized no glue and pressure from the other sand grains alone held the artwork together. When Clemens completed a sand bottle he sealed it with a stopper and wax. At first, Clemens' work was simple and geometric in nature; diamond shaped patterns against an ivory white background was a regular motif in his earliest work.

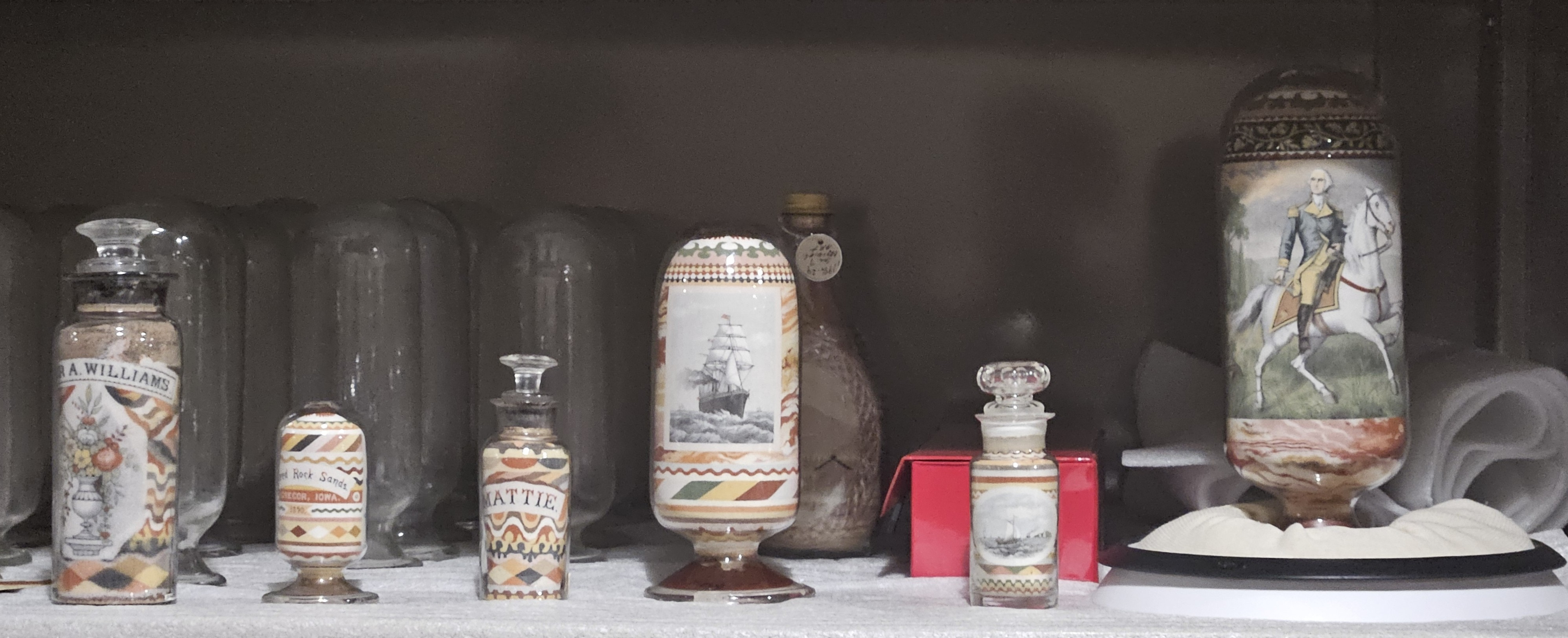
Sand bottle collection by Andrew Clemens

His technique improved gradually and eventually people wanted to buy his work, which now included complex designs like flowers, landscapes, steamboats and trains. McGregor residents and people visiting the town would often order bottles as presents for friends and relatives. Hence, many bottles have the names or initials of the person it was dedicated to all done in sand. He created most of his work between 1875 and 1893. While the number of sand bottles Clemens made is unknown, it is thought that he produced several hundred but relative few survive today Common motifs that were depicted in his bottles was the American Eagle and Flag and wreaths or bouquet of flowers. Custom pieces would include scene of the client's choosing. He created many of his images upside down in so called, inverted apothecary bottles. Upon completion, Clemens would secure the stopper in the bottle, and flip it right side up. He began advertising his sand bottles in the North Iowa Times in 1874.

In 1877 a fire destroyed part of the State School for the Deaf. Subsequently, Andrew returned to McGregor to live year-round and did not return to the school. He was offered a job as a teacher there, but declined. Instead, he turned full time to making sand art bottles. He even showed his work at the Saint Paul Dime Museum in 1889. He earned an invitation to demonstrate his work at the 1893 Chicago Columbian Exposition, which he declined due to his failing health. His artwork sold for $5–7 at the time.

While rare articles about Andrew Clemens appeared in his time and in the decades, he remained largely unknown outside of McGregor. Then in 2002, a Clemens bottle, inscribed to Dr. Prosper Harvey Ellsworth, was brought to the Antiques Roadshow (filmed at Hot Springs Arkansas). Without any comparables, it was appraised for $4 - 6,000.00 as an incredible piece of folk art. The airing of the show generated great interest in Clemens and over the years his works would rarely come up for auction selling for thousands of dollars. The Prosper Ellsworth bottle sold for $275,000 in November 13, 2020 in Skinner's online American furniture and decorative arts auction. A floral and patriotic eagle sand bottle by Clemens made for Mrs. Eliza B. Lewis sold for $132,000 including buyer's premium in Cincinnati, Ohio, on October 6, 2018. The record sale at auction of a Clemens bottle, inscribed to Orrin T. Fuller with a depiction of his portrait as a child, was $956,000 at Freeman's auction in October 1, 2021.

A comprehensive book, The Sand Art Bottles of Andrew Clemens, was published in 2015. In 2026, The Sand Art Bottles of Andrew Clemens, 2nd Edition was published. It greatly expanded on the first edition with many more photographs of sand bottles, backstories, a new chapter of extraordinary and unusual bottles, and additional information about the Clemens family and their hometown of McGregor.

== Late life ==
Andrew was ill in his last year of life but his exact cause of death remains unknown. He died on May 12, 1894 at age 37 years. A notice at the time circulated around McGregor announcing that his funeral was to be held on May 14, 1894.

== See also ==
- Sand art and play
