= Joe Mangrum =

American artist

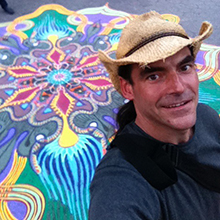
- Joe Mangrum in front of sand painting in Union Square, NYC.
- Born: February 10, 1969 (age 57); Florissant, Missouri, United States
- Education: The School of the Art Institute of Chicago
- Known for: visual art, sand painting, installation art, photography
- Spouse: Deborah Mangrum-Price
- Awards: The 'Lorenzo il Magnifico' Award Florence Biennale#The .27Lorenzo il Magnifico.27 Award Florence Biennale 2003
- Website: http://www.joemangrum.com

Joe Mangrum (born February 10, 1969) is an installation and multiple artist who is particularly known for his large-scale colored sand paintings. He resides in New York City. Using a wide spectrum of components, his work often includes organic materials, such as flowers, food and sand, in addition to deconstructed computer parts, auto parts and a multitude of found and collected objects. His installations often include mandala-like forms, pyramids, maps, grids and mushroom clouds and the Ouroboros.

== Early life and education ==
Joe Mangrum was born in Florissant, Missouri, near St. Louis. He started taking oil painting lessons when he was 8. At age 16 he won a trip to India, in an art competition sponsored by the Asia Society. His entry in the contest was a painting which portrayed a series of baskets representing his limited knowledge of India. The trip sparked an interest in travel and multicultural influences. Mangrum attended The School of the Art Institute of Chicago (SAIC) and received his Bachelor of Fine Arts degree in 1991. His focus of study was on painting and photography, though, after art school, he began to expand his work into site-specific, environmental and ephemeral installations.

== Sand paintings ==
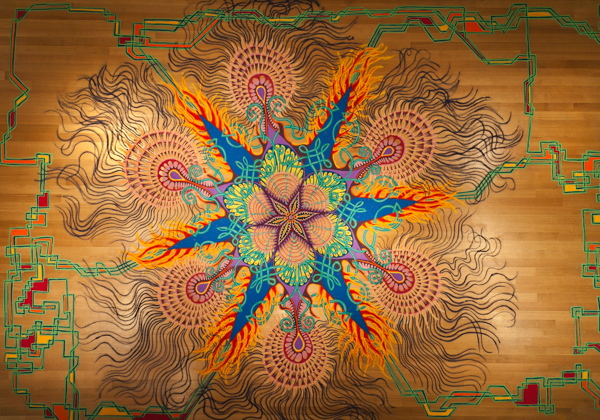
Mangrum's "Asynchronous Syntropy" sand painting

Joe Mangrum has created hundreds of sand paintings in public spaces of New York City. Each large scale sand painting is spontaneously created by pouring colored sand into multiple patterns over the course of a day and is often fifteen to twenty feet in diameter. He cites influences from many sources in what he calls, “...organic symmetry where the feeling of the design is of a living being outstretched on the pavement...images may intertwine like a Celtic knot or represent nature like a sea anemone, DNA strands or some biomorphic form, sometimes very psychedelic.” He also describes "... an urban free-style and combined with bright 'Pop Art' colors, fractal variations and circuitry. My paintings are influenced by an abundant world of undersea creatures, carnivorous plants emanating electrical impulses, a living mathematical amalgam and botanical geometry stemming cross-cultural metaphors..." He also cites influences such as Rangoli, Buddhist mandalas, Navajo sand paintings, mosaics in Islamic art and the rose windows of European cathedrals.

He has been commissioned to create site-specific sand paintings for The Museum of Arts and Design, FLAG Arts Foundation, Corcoran Gallery Rotunda, Asia Society, United Nations School and Adelphi University. Mangrum has also produced sand paintings in San Francisco, Miami, Chicago, New Orleans, Detroit and San Cristobal, Mexico.

== Early work and California ==
After graduating from The School of the Art Institute of Chicago, Mangrum traveled for over four years in Europe and throughout the United States. Eventually he settled in Laguna Beach, California and began to arrange floral and natural materials into installations in public spaces. These often, circular forms have been called mandalas, though Mangrum has more recently chosen to describe them as biomorphic or organic installations. His first installations in Laguna Beach stemmed from a desire to draw attention to the impending San Joaquin Hills Toll Road(California State Route 73) in 1994. The road would divide one of the last major open green spaces in Orange County, California. His newly found activism propelled his determination to examine environmental issues in the forum of public art. He began to create organic forms at Main Beach Park, a public space in Laguna Beach. His art work was swept up by the Parks Department, so he continued to create new pieces and they were relentlessly swept up again. This resulted in a visit to a city council meeting by Mangrum. The council demanded that he obtain one million dollars' worth of liability insurance. The story was picked up by the L.A. Times and thereby sparked further discussion about art, its expression and the right to protest. Mangrum was invited to produce his first solo show at San Francisco State University in 1995 . This show marked his first usage of found objects, auto parts and money in addition to his organic materials. It consisted of five biomorphic forms on the ground with a wall painting in binary code of the story of the Lorax by Dr. Seuss, contained in an enlarged image of Mangrum’s thumbprint. Once Mangrum had acquired insurance, he returned to Laguna beach and created installations titled “Creation, Capitalism and Corrective Surgery,” and “Echoes of Corrective Surgery” based on his observations of life in Southern California.

A second L.A. Times article in 1995 caught the eye of art gallerist, Daniel Arvizu, who invited Mangrum to install a solo show at his gallery in Santa Ana, California. Mangrum created an ephemeral installation inspired by Bosch’s The Garden of Earthly Delights using molasses (as a substitute for oil) and orange slices in an interpretation of observations of the oil industry and its environmental “purgatories” in Orange County. Mangrum continued his use of Molasses in combination with wheat grass and piano parts in a group show entitled “The Embarrassment of Riches,” at Huntington Beach Art Center curated by Marilu Knode.

== San Francisco ==
Mangrum took up residence in San Francisco in the mid-1990s after many years of traveling and continued to make public art both spontaneously and commissioned projects by the city of San Francisco. He was commissioned for two permanent terrazzo artworks that can be found on opposite corners of Mission and 22nd streets in San Francisco. In addition, an ephemeral installation titled “ Trans-mission 98”, was created at Justin Herman Plaza. This temporary installation consisted of dismantling the artist’s car and arranging it as a cityscape with organic elements of sod in Justin Herman Plaza. A reporter from the San Francisco Chronicle hastily ran the license plate number of the car and wrote an article incorrectly stating that a deal had been struck between the city and Mangrum to exchange his commission fee for absolution of multiple parking tickets. The article was picked up by various papers and blogs including “News of the Weird.” This controversy resulted in Ralph Guggenheim, the chair of the visual arts committee at the Art Commission, clarifying in a letter to the editor that “...The San Francisco Art Commission did not, and does not cut deals with artists. Mr. Mangrum, like any citizen, is responsible for paying his parking tickets. The implication that the commission approved this work instead of paying the tickets is ridiculous.”

In 2005, in celebration of World Environment Day, Mangrum created a 40 ft tall and 16 ft wide Mushroom Cloud of live wheatgrass. The project was grown over a 2-week period in various locations in San Francisco and contained 300 lbs of dry wheatgrass seed. The cloud towered over an artificial cityscape made from industrial parts. The title of the project was "Detonation Earth" and was installed at Red Ink Studios in San Francisco.

Mangrum continued to utilize organic elements such as wheatgrass, flowers and palm leaves with car parts, bullets, machine wheels, and sand in his large scale ephemeral installations. He created site specific works for SFMOMA Gallery at Fort Mason San Francisco Museum of Modern Art#SFMOMA Artists Gallery at Fort Mason, Bioneers Conference and the M. H. de Young Memorial Museum. Mangrum also continued to produce three-dimensional installations at local galleries such as Urbis Artium, (now Mark Wolfe Contemporary Art), pop up exhibits and festivals.

Additionally, he founded an alternative warehouse space known as Facility 3 from 1997 to 2003, which functioned as a multi-use art studio and event space that hosted many performers and theatrical groups like Shotgun Players and musicians such as Sean Hayes (musician), Jolie Holland, Extra Action Marching Band; various Burning Man and DJ events, including the late DJ Cheb i Sabbah and Lorin a.k.a. Bassnectar.

== New York ==
In 2008, Mangrum moved to New York. He had installed a solo show titled, “Impressions” at Chi Contemporary Gallery (now Causey Contemporary) in Brooklyn, 2006. This solo show marked the emergence of sand painting as a primary feature in his work. He produced a second solo show at Chi Contemporary in 2009, titled “Chrysalis Stage.” Mangrum began his series of over 700 sand paintings in public spaces of New York City in 2009 and continues currently. The public is most likely to view these paintings periodically in Washington Square Park and Union Square, Manhattan. In 2010, he created a sand runway for designer Jen Kao during Fashion Week which landed him Vanity Fair as a cartoon. In 2018, for Fashion Week NYC Mangrum was commissioned by Designer Prabal Gurung to create 3 sand paintings for a fashion runway featured in NY Times Mangrum has appeared on multiple media outlets and blogs. He regularly posts updates of his works in progress live on social media and his website. His sand-stained hands were included on the cover of Humans of New York (HONY), by photographer, Brandon Stanton, and later appeared in Episode 1 "Time" (19:20-21:20) of Humans of New York: The Series

== Broadcasts ==
After a brief appearance in 2012, where a time lapse was created at Washington Square Park for the "Word on the Street", Joe was a guest on Sesame Street in 2013 featured in the "People in Your Neighborhood segment with Murray and Ovejita, creating a portrait of the pair of Muppets in sand with a distinctive background of The Mona Lisa. He has also been interviewed for the PBS art program, Spark on KQED, 2006 and PBS, Chicago Tonight WTTW, 2013.

== Festivals ==
Joe Mangrum has designed and created sculptural installations and architectural pieces for Coachella Valley Music and Arts Festival, The Electric Daisy Carnival, The Mile High Music Festival and All Points West Music & Arts Festival among many others.

== Academia ==
- Academic Article on ephemeral art
