= Chak-pur =

Traditional funnels used in Tibetan sandpainting to produce mandalas

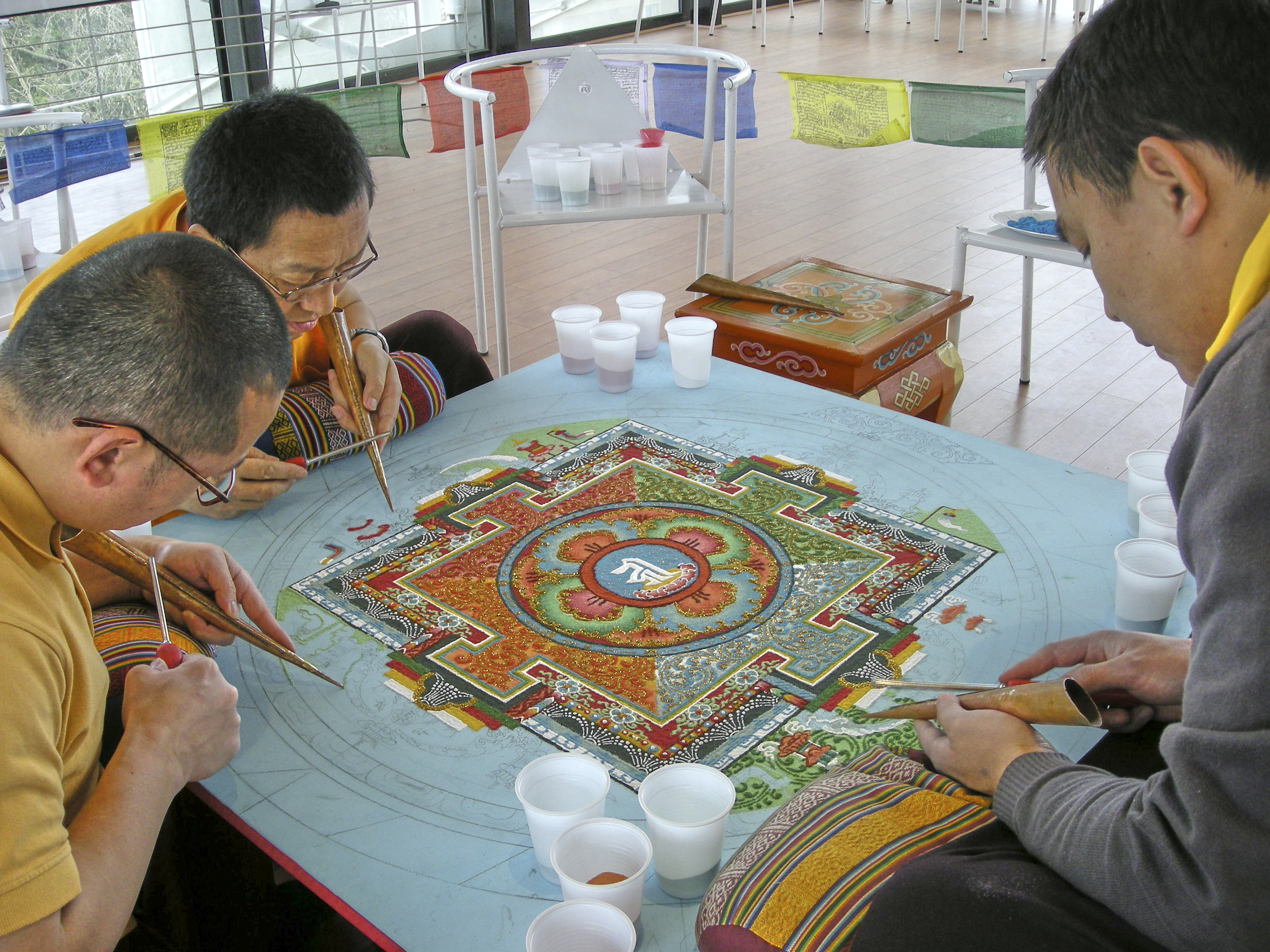
Mandala Sable 2008-05 showing the use of chak-pur

Chak-pur (Standard Tibetan: ལྕགས་ཕུར) are the traditional tools used in Tibetan sandpainting to produce sand mandalas. They are conically shaped metal funnels and often have ridges down the sides. Normally about 12–18 inches (300–460 mm) in length, they taper to a fine point and are made with varying diameter holes at the end in order to disperse the sand in a controlled way. A Tibetan monk will usually tap glide a piece of wood over the ridges in order to slowly allow the sand to emerge through the hole through the vibrations created.
