= Sandpainting =

Form of art creation

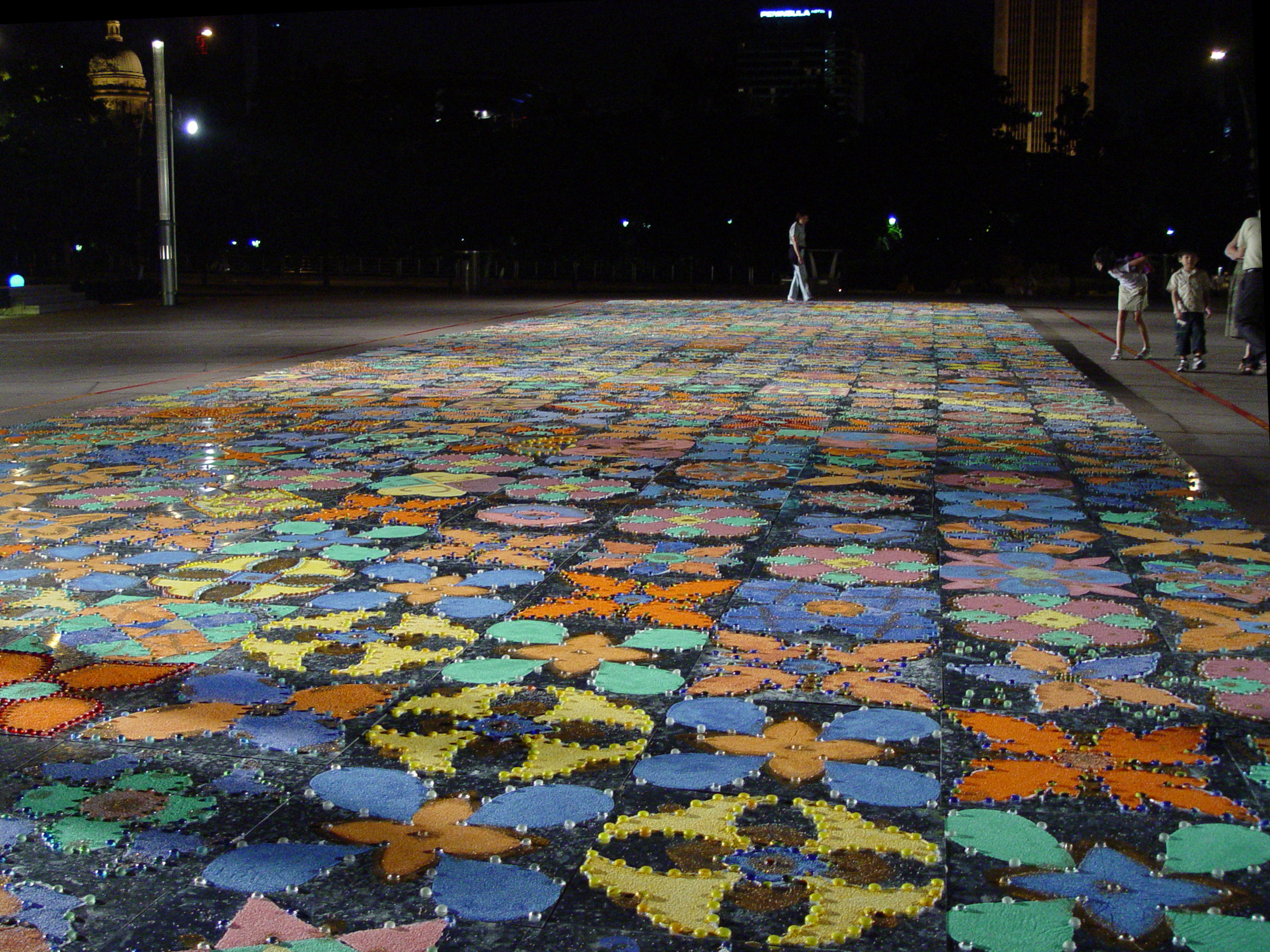
Rangoli, a popular form of Indian sandpainting in Singapore.

Sandpainting or drypainting is the art of pouring colored sands, and powdered pigments from minerals or crystals, or pigments from other natural or synthetic sources onto a surface to make a fixed or unfixed sand painting. Unfixed sand paintings have a long established cultural history in numerous social groupings around the globe, and are often temporary, ritual paintings prepared for religious or healing ceremonies. Drypainting is practiced by Native Americans in the Southwestern United States, by Tibetan and Buddhist monks, as well as Indigenous Australians and Latin Americans for festivals.

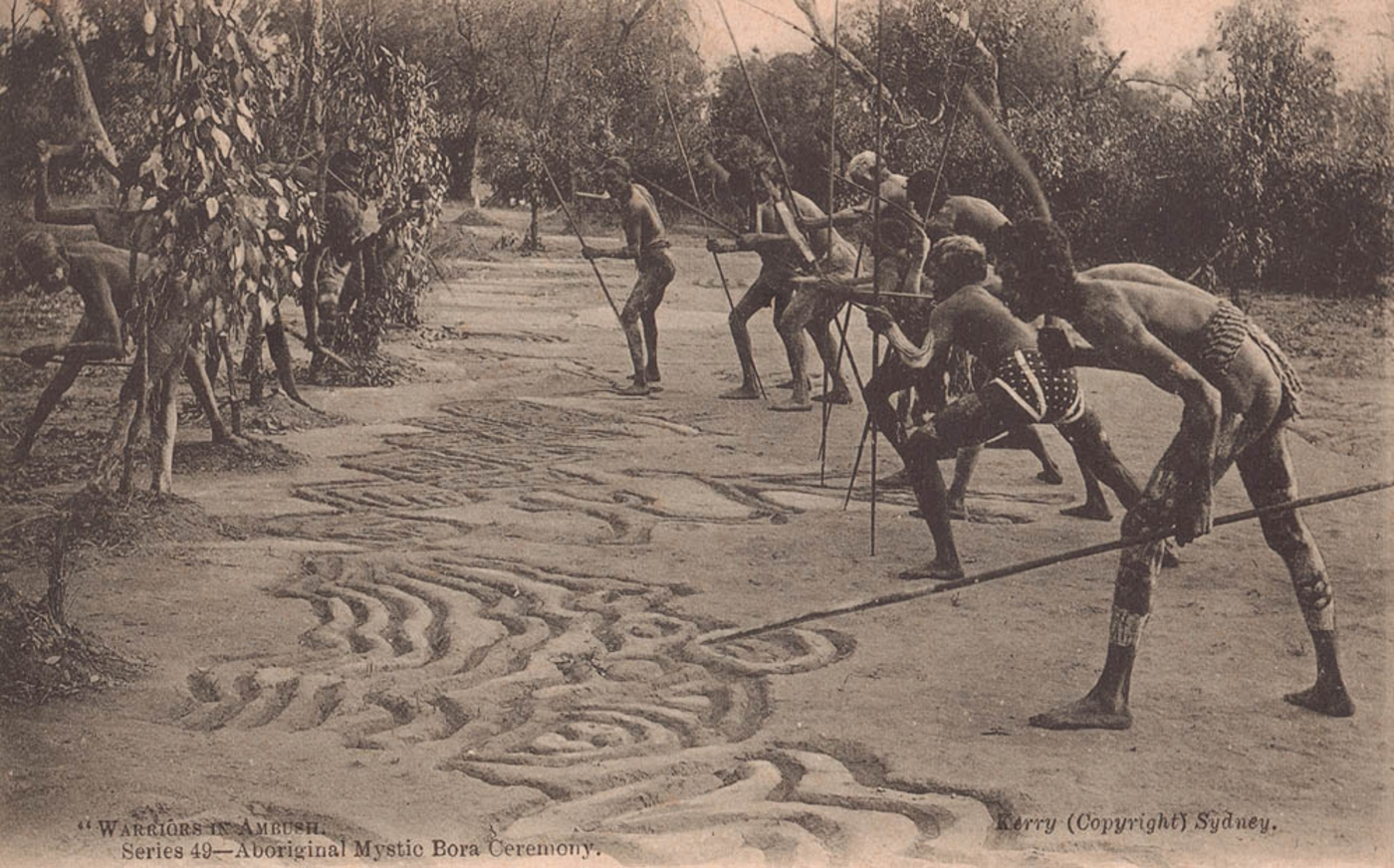
SLNSW 75764 Warriors in Ambush series 49 Aboriginal Mystic Bora Ceremony

== History ==
=== Native American sandpainting ===
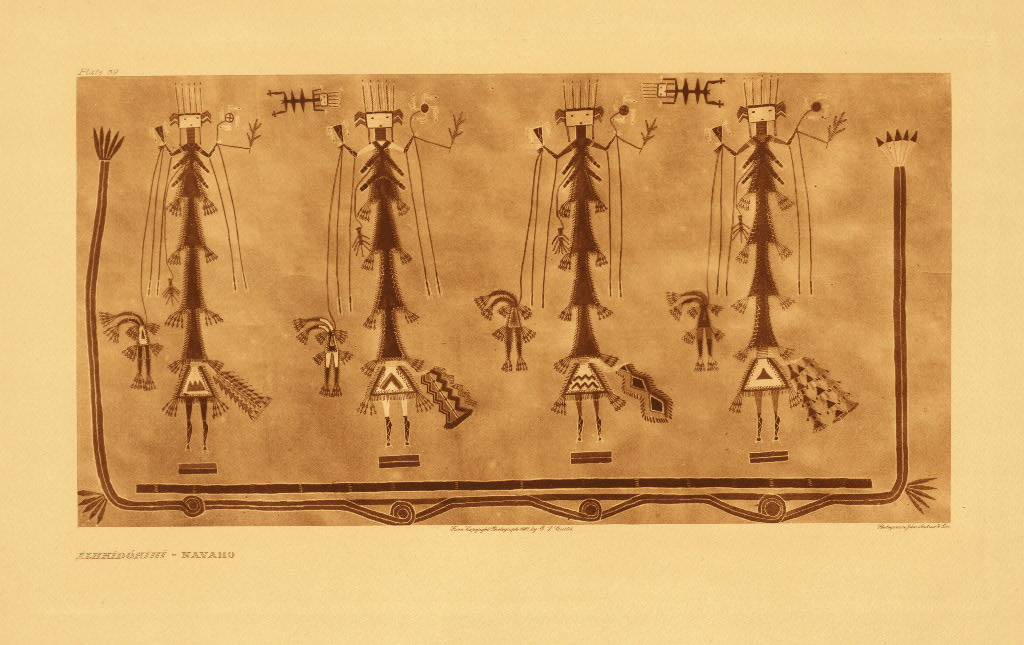
Navajo sandpainting, photogravure by Edward S. Curtis, 1907, Library of Congress

In the sandpainting of southwestern Native Americans (the most famous of which are the Navajo [known as the Diné]), the Medicine Man (or Hatałii) paints loosely upon the ground of a hogan, where the ceremony takes place, or on a buckskin or cloth tarpaulin, by letting the colored sands flow through his fingers with control and skill. There are 600 to 1,000 different traditional designs for sandpaintings known to the Navajo. They do not view the paintings as static objects, but as spiritual, living beings to be treated with great respect. More than 30 different sandpaintings may be associated with one ceremony.

The colors for the painting are usually accomplished with naturally colored sand, crushed gypsum (white), yellow ocher, red sandstone, charcoal and a mixture of charcoal and gypsum (blue). Brown can be made by mixing red and black; red and white make pink. Other coloring agents include corn meal, flower pollen, or powdered roots and bark.

The paintings are for healing purposes only. Many of them contain images of Yeibicheii (the Holy People). While creating the painting, the medicine man will chant, asking the yeibicheii to come into the painting and help heal the patient.

When the medicine man finishes painting, he checks its accuracy. The order and symmetry of the painting symbolize the harmony which a patient wishes to reestablish in his or her life. The accuracy of a sandpainting is believed to determine its efficacy as a sacred tool. The patient will be asked to sit on the sandpainting as the medicine man proceeds with the healing chant. It is claimed the sandpainting acts as a portal to attract the spirits and allow them to come and go. Practitioners believe sitting on the sandpainting helps the patient to absorb spiritual power, while in turn the Holy People will absorb the illness and take it away. Afterward, when the sandpainting has served its purpose, it is considered to be toxic, since it has absorbed the illness. For this reason, the painting is destroyed. Because of the sacred nature of the ceremonies, the sandpaintings are begun, finished, used and destroyed within 12 hours.

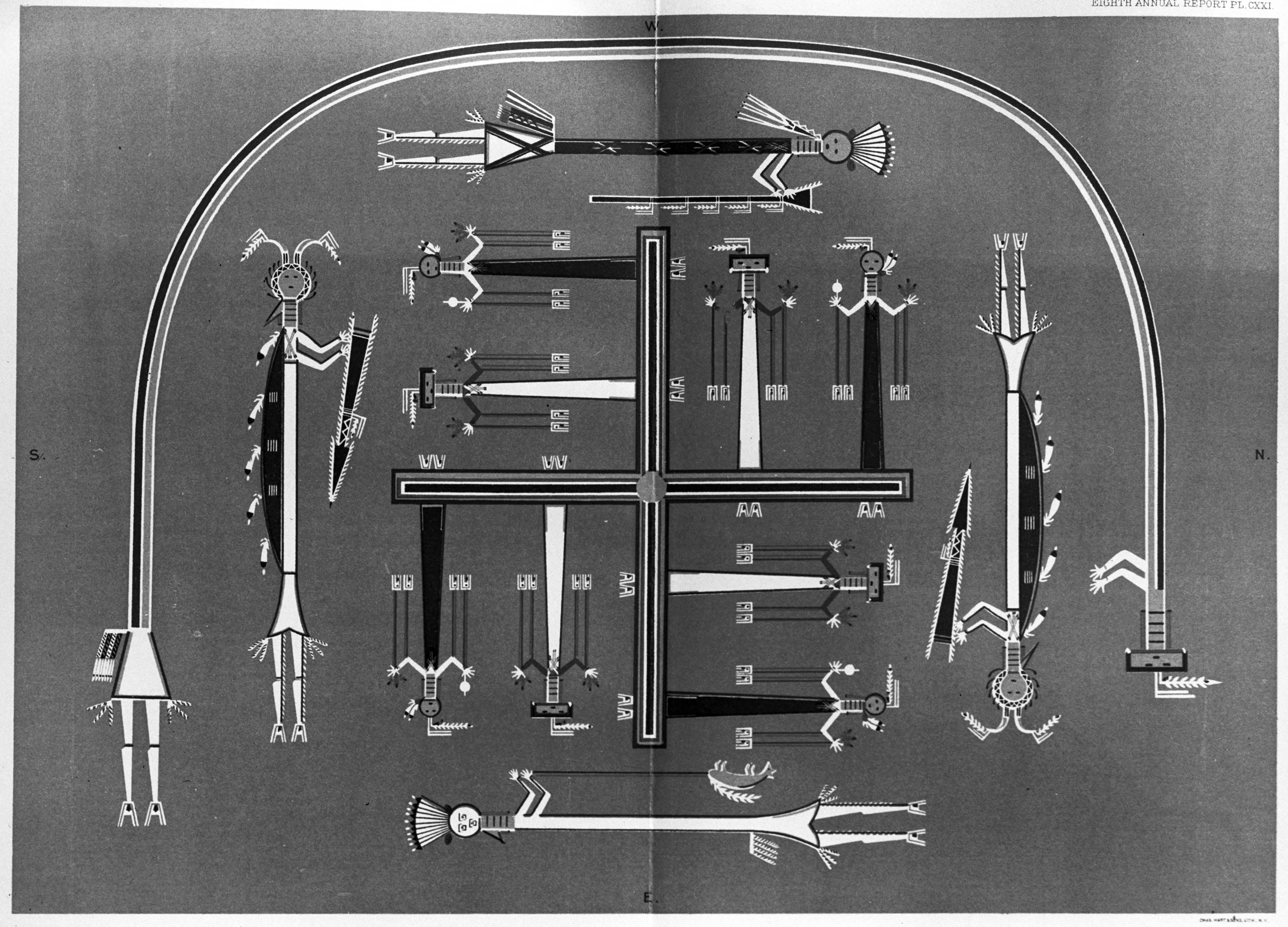
Navajo sandpainting, photo by H.S. Poley, published c. 1890–1908, Library of Congress

The ceremonies involving sandpaintings are usually done in sequences, termed "chants", lasting a certain number of days depending on the ceremony. At least one fresh, new sandpainting is made for each day.

Some Navajo laws and taboos relate to the sandpaintings, and protect their holiness:

- Women of child-bearing age are not supposed to sing the chants associated with the yeibicheii. This is both because the ceremony has a possibility of injuring an unborn child, and because of a taboo preventing menstruating women from attending. (Some cultures considered menstruation and presence of blood to be powerful spiritual events that had to be restrained, as they represented life forces.) Post-menopausal women are more likely to be chanters or diagnosticians.
- Authentic sandpaintings are rarely photographed, so as to not disrupt the flow of the ceremony. For many reasons, medicine men will seldom allow outsiders inside a sacred ceremony. Because so many outsiders are curious about sandpainting, some medicine men may create pieces for exhibition purposes only, using reversed colors and variations. To create an authentic sandpainting solely for viewing would be a profane act. The sandpaintings for sale in shops and on the Internet are commercially produced and contain deliberate errors, as the real sandpaintings are considered sacred.
- The earliest credited instance of traditional Navajo sandpaintings (being rendered in colored sands as opposed to tapestry or other media) being created in a permanent form for sale, have been traced to between 1945 and 1955. The main credit is generally given to a Navajo Hatałii named Fred Stevens, Jr. (Grey Squirrel/Fred Fernando Stevens Jr.)), who developed the primary method of "permatizing" for commercial sandpaintings that is still used.

=== Indigenous Australian sandpainting ===
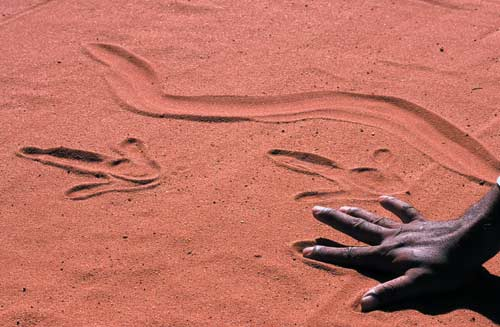
Artwork in Alice Springs

Indigenous Australian art has a history which covers more than 30,000 years, and a wide range of native traditions and styles. These have been studied in recent decades and their complexity has gained increased international recognition. Aboriginal Art covers a wide variety of media, including sandpainting, painting on leaves, wood carving, rock carving, sculpture, and ceremonial clothing, as well as artistic embellishments found on weaponry and also tools. Art is one of the key rituals of Aboriginal culture. It was and still is, used to mark territory, record history, and tell stories about "The Dreaming".

Aboriginal people have taken to transforming their tradition sand paintings into more permanent forms using modern techniques and materials.

Geoffrey Bardon was an Australian art teacher who was instrumental in creating the Aboriginal art of the Western Desert movement, and in bringing Australian indigenous art to the attention of the world."... [directed by Bardon, the elders] began to interact with certain issues in 1960s and 70s international painting, especially the extreme schematization of New York minimalism." In the History of Painting"Lyrical Abstraction in the late 1960s is characterized by the paintings of Dan Christensen, Ronnie Landfield, Peter Young and others, and along with the fluxus movement and postminimalism (a term first coined by Robert Pincus-Witten in the pages of Artforum in 1969) sought to expand the boundaries of abstract painting and minimalism by focusing on process, new materials and new ways of expression."

This connection is seen most obviously in the connection between the paintings from the late sixties of Peter Young (artist) and the paintings that follow in the early seventies produced in the Papunya Tula.

Papunya Tula, or Papunya Tula Artists Pty Ltd, is an artist cooperative formed in 1972 that is owned and operated by Aboriginal people from the Western Desert of Australia. Kaapa Tjampitjinpa is one of the early Papunya Tula artists and is known for Gulgardi. It is notable for being the first work by an Indigenous Australian artist to win a contemporary art award, and the first public recognition of a Papunya painting.

=== Tibetan sandpainting ===
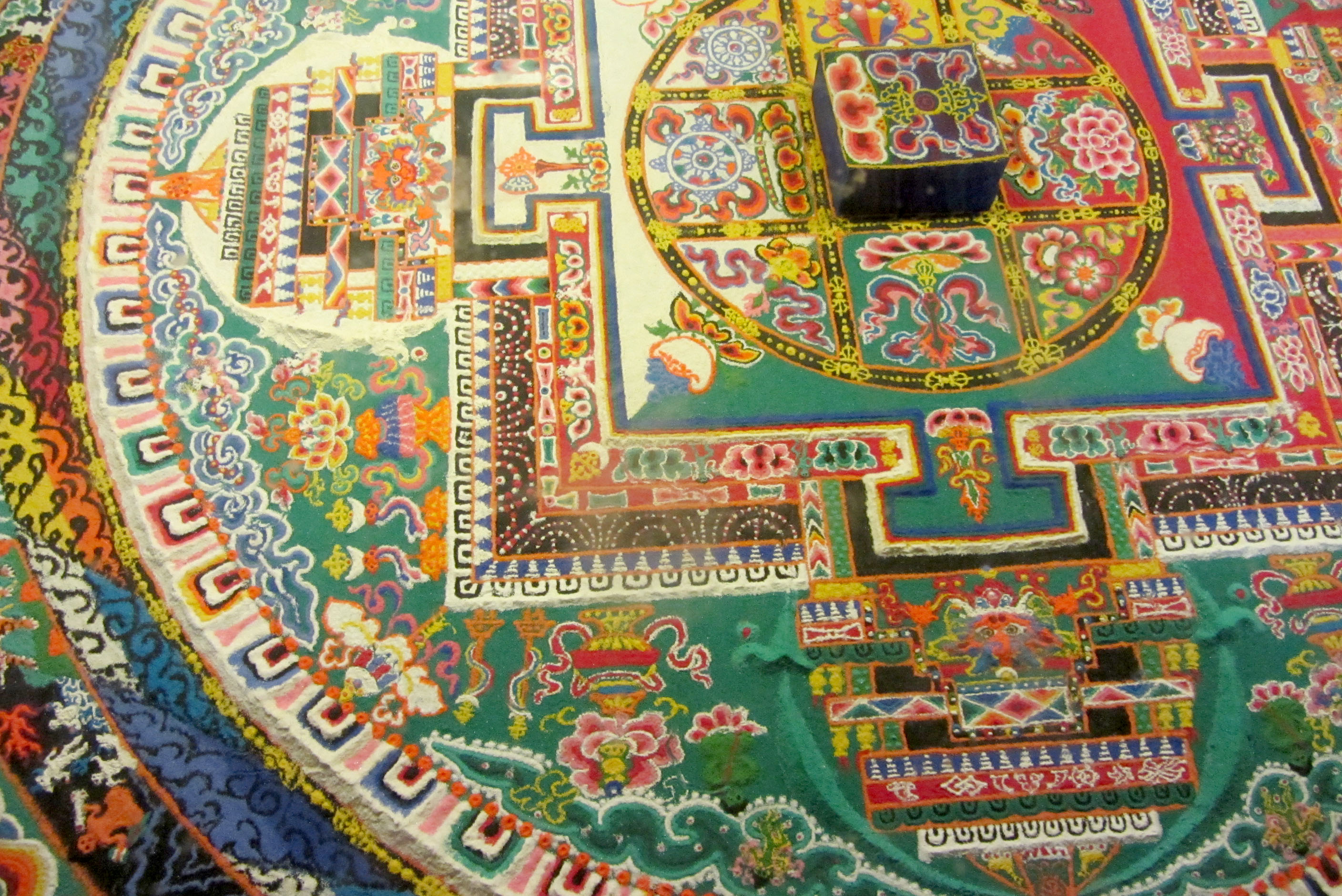
Mandala made of sand in the Sera Monastery, Lhasa

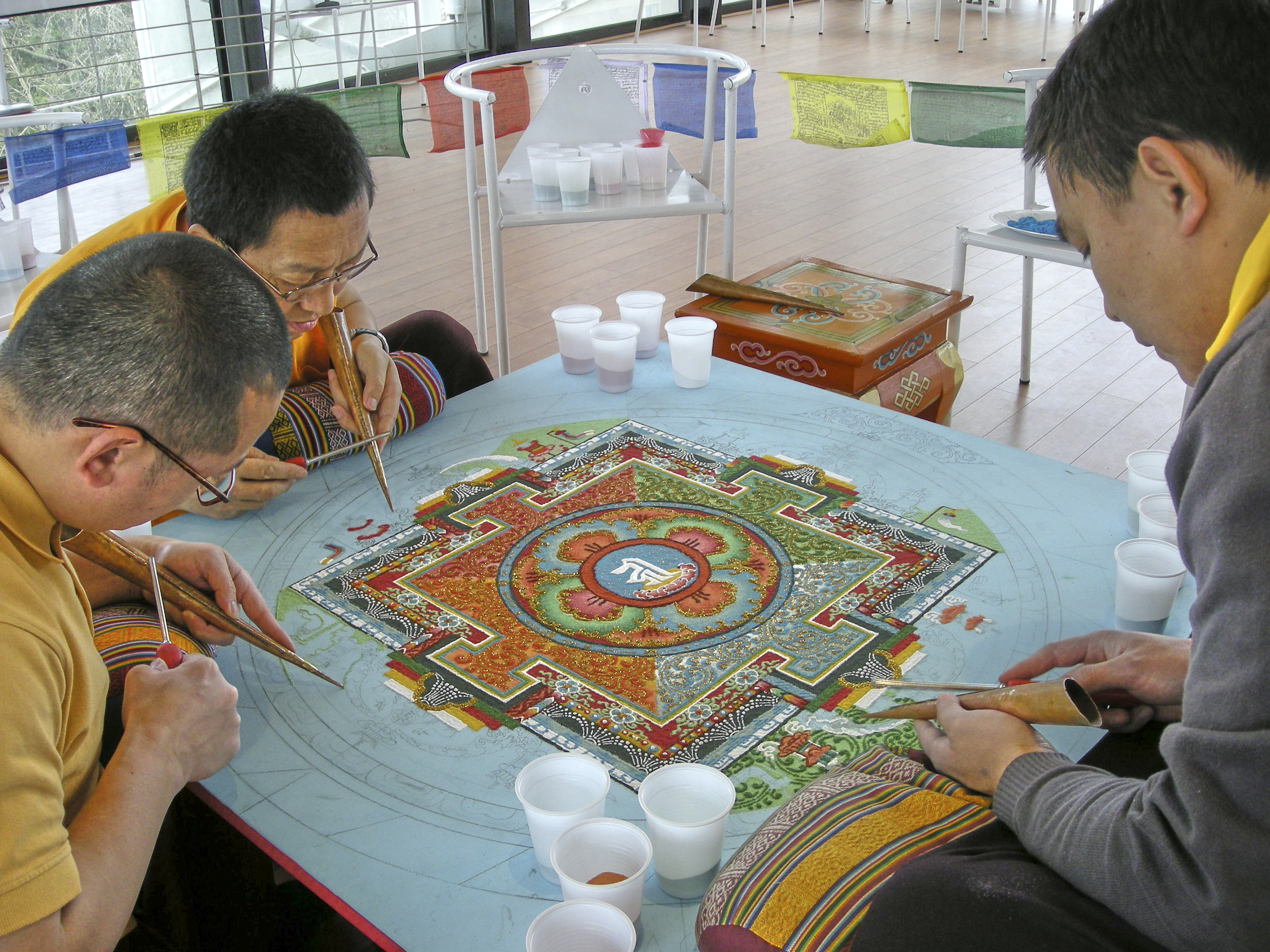
Mandala Sable 2008-05 showing the use of Chak-pur

Tibetan Buddhist sand paintings are usually composed of mandalas. In Tibetan, it is called dul-tson-kyil-khor (mandala of colored powders). The sand is carefully placed on a large, flat table. The construction process takes several days, and the mandala is destroyed shortly after its completion. This is done as a teaching tool and metaphor for the "impermanence" (Pali: anicca) of all contingent and compounded phenomena (Sanskrit: Pratītya-samutpāda).

The mandala sand-painting process begins with an opening ceremony, during which the lamas, or Tibetan priests, consecrate the site and call forth the forces of goodness. They chant, declare intention, mudra, asana, pranayama, do visualizations, play music, recite mantras, etc.

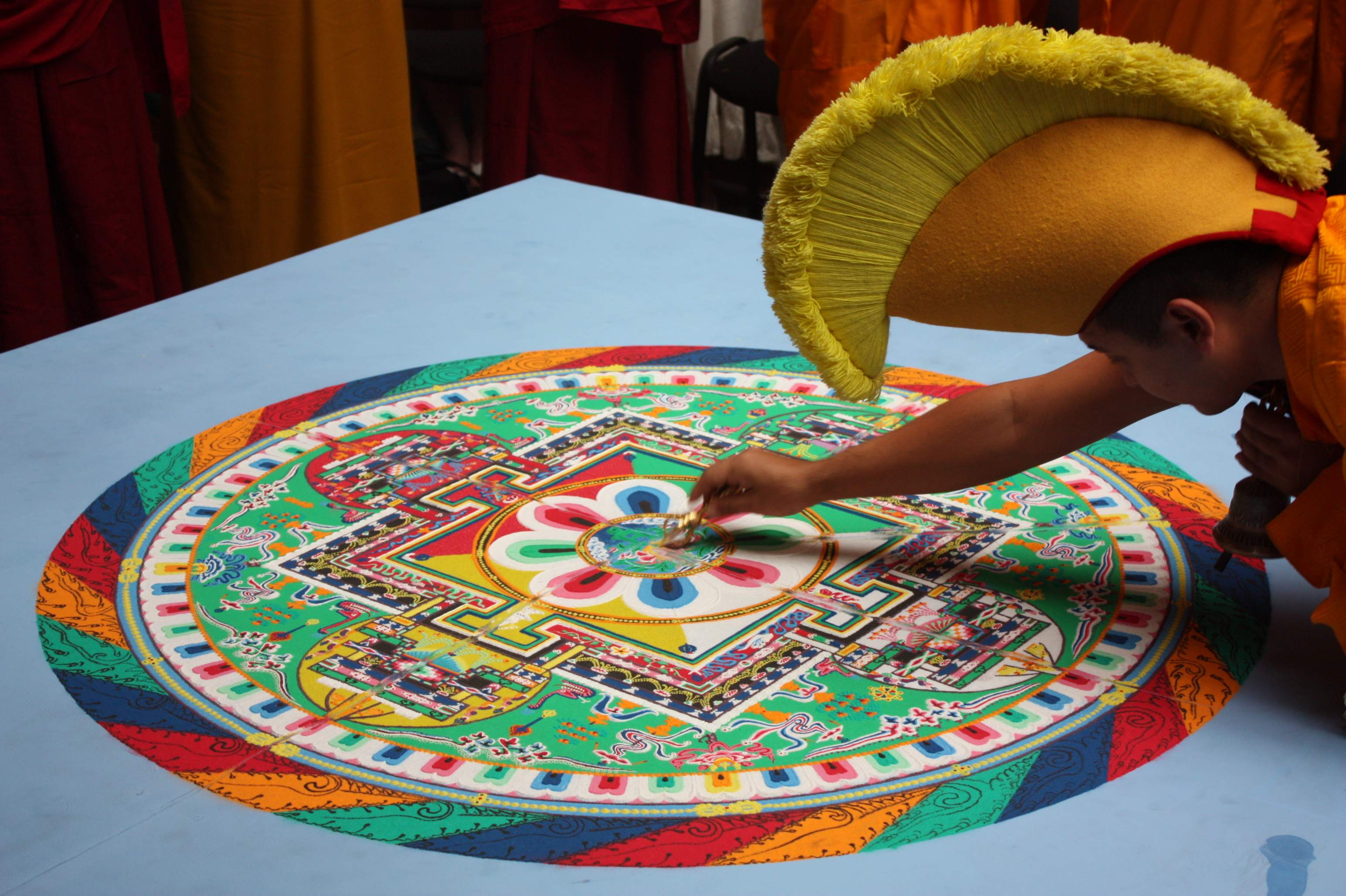
Mandala zel-tary using Vajra to ceremoniously divide the painting

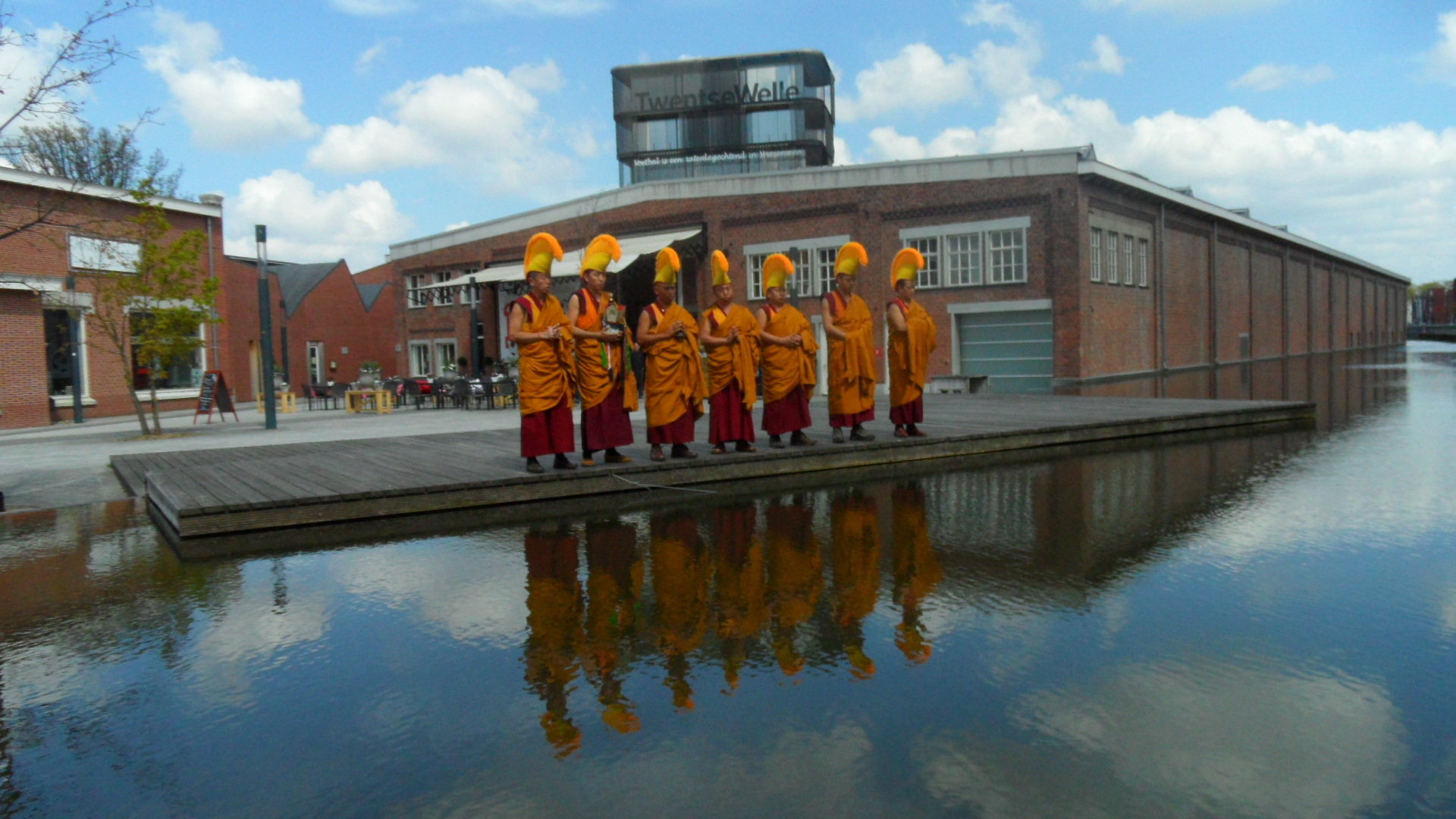
Tibetan monks in a ceremony after having broken their mandala, Twentse Welle

On the first day, the lamas begin by drawing an outline of the mandala to be painted on a wooden platform. The following days see the laying of the colored sands, which is effected by pouring the sand from traditional metal funnels called chak-pur. Each monk holds a chak-pur in one hand, while running a metal rod on its serrated surface; the vibration causes the sands to flow like liquid. Formed of traditional prescribed iconography that includes geometric shapes and a multitude of ancient spiritual symbols (e.g.: Ashtamangala and divine attributes of yidam), seed syllables, mantra, the sand-painted mandala is used as a tool or instrument for innumerable purposes. A primary purpose is to reconsecrate the earth and its inhabitants. When the meditation is complete, the sand painting is ceremoniously destroyed using a Vajra and the sand is then gathered and taken to a body of water for offering.

=== Japanese tray pictures ===
Emperor Tenmu (631–686), the 40th emperor of Japan, used Bonseki techniques to describe landscapes and natural objects. Several gardens in Kyoto are also believed to have been designed using bonseki. The 1300 essay by the Japanese Zen monk Kokan Shiren, "Rhymeprose on a Miniature Landscape Garden", talks about the principles of bonseki and garden architecture. Bonseki became a popular art form of the Japanese aristocracy during the reign of Ashikaga Yoshimasa (1443–1490). The historical figure with the most profound influence on the Japanese "Way of Tea", Sen no Rikyū (1522–1591), practiced bonseki. From the 15th century in Japan, Buddhist artists in the times of the shōguns practiced the craft of bonseki by sprinkling dry colored sand and pebbles onto the surface of plain black lacquered trays. They used bird feathers as brushes to form the sandy surface into seascapes and landscapes. These tray pictures were used in religious ceremonies. Although the practice of bonseki nearly died out after WWII, there are still actively practicing schools.

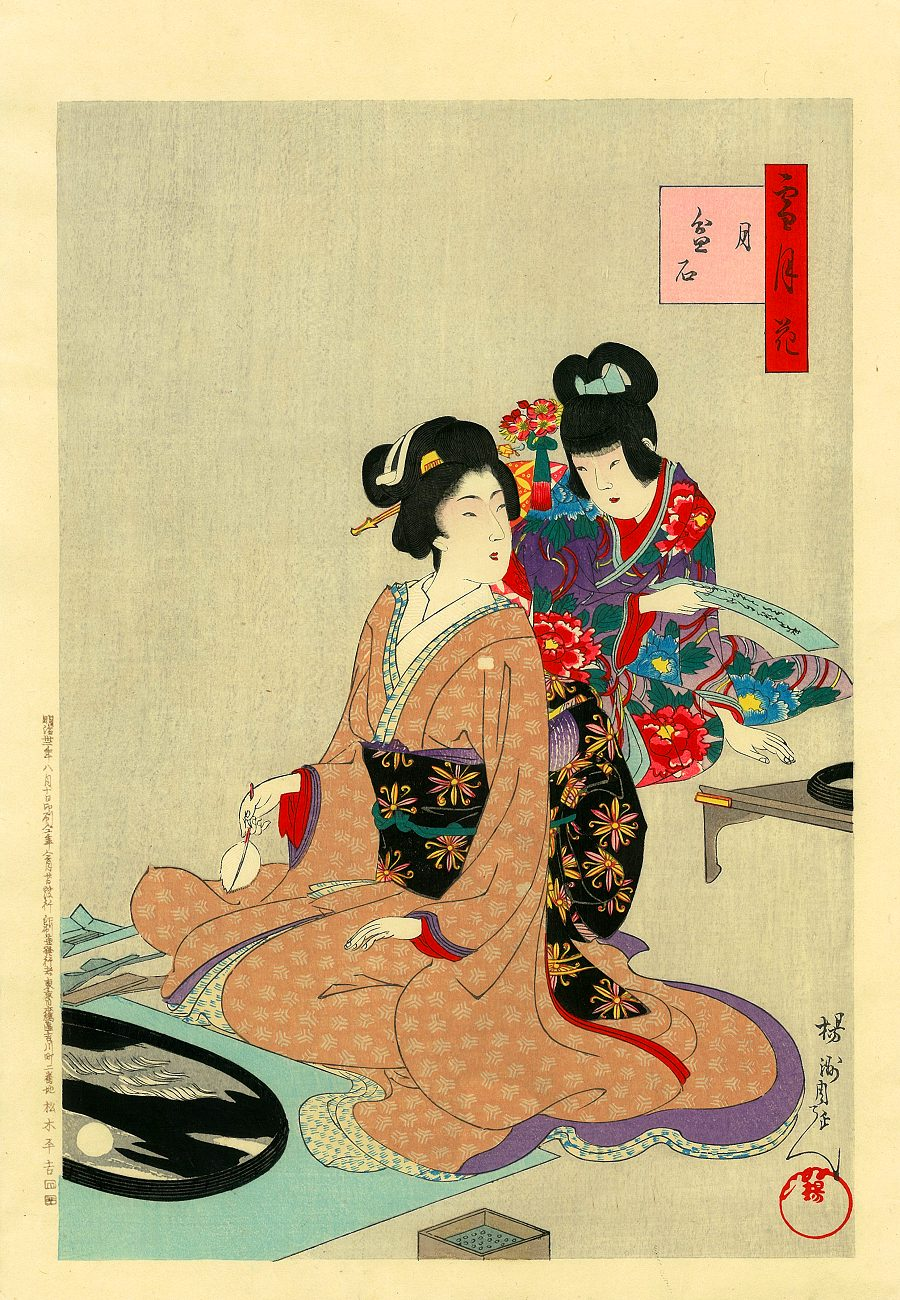
A woman making a tray landscape showing the full moon. Ukiyo-e woodblock print by Yōshū Chikanobu, 1899

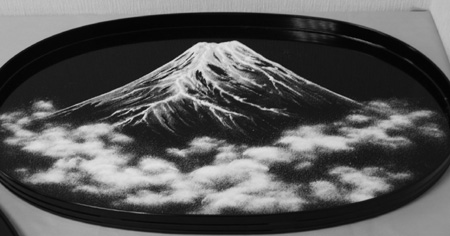
Mt fuji bonseki

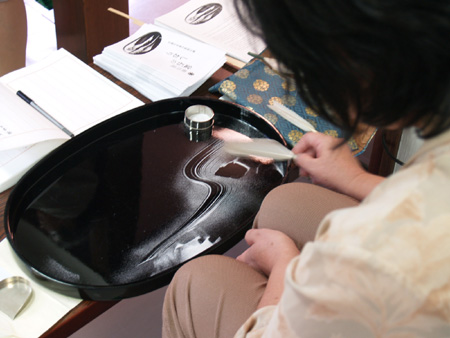
Bonseki artist at work

=== Table decking ===
During the 17th and 18th centuries, the royal courts of Europe employed "table deckers", who decorated the side tables at royal banquets having adapted the craft of 'bonseki' from the Japanese. The table deckers sprinkled colored sands, marble dust, sugars, etc. upon the surface of plain white tablecloths to create unfixed pictures of fruit, flowers, birds and rustic scenery. In between each design spaces were left for fruit bowls and sweetmeat dishes so that the diners could refresh themselves in between the main courses of the feast. These ornate pictures were discarded along with the debris of the feast.

As a fine example of the table deckers' craft, Woburn Abbey in Bedfordshire, England possesses an ornate folding screen with three panels, decorated with sand pictures protected by glass. The center one has five spaces for sweetmeat pyramid dishes while the two side leaves of the screen have three spaces for fruit trays. There are four sand pictures in each corner of the side panels of the screen, featuring 18th-century pastoral scenes, while the remaining areas of the screen are decorated with butterflies, doves, fruit, flowers, etc. The screen would be laid upon the surface of a side table. It doubled as a serving base for elaborate porcelain dishes and glass trays containing fruits, bonbons and sweetmeats, from which the hosts and their guests could help themselves while socializing or stretching their legs between the multiple courses being served on the main table in the dining hall. This screen may have been the work of the German artisan F. Schweikhardt, who specialized in still-life studies in the style of the Dutch painter Jan van Huysum.

=== Georgian sandpainting ===
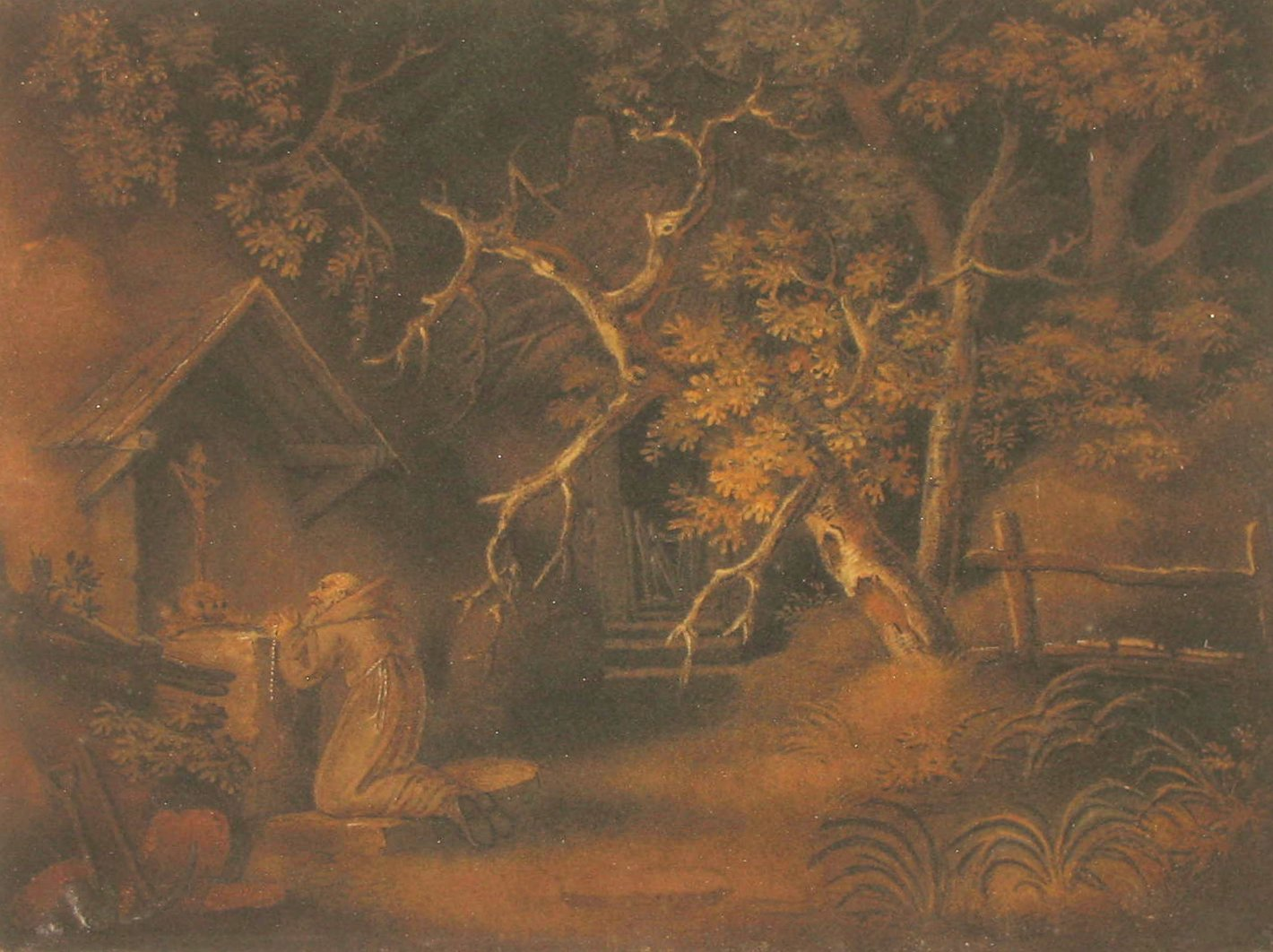
A Hermit by a Wayside Shrine by Benjamin Zobel (early 19th century)

Georgian sandpainting was introduced by King George III, a skilled watchmaker and craftsman in his own right who took an interest in the skills demonstrated by royal functionaries, known as Table Deckers, who decorated the white tablecloths at royal banquets with ornate centerpieces decorated by using unfixed colored sands and sugars as paint, a craft introduced by travelers who had observed the craftsmen at work in Japan.

It was while watching the table deckers at work the King suggested that if the sand pictures being temporarily laid out upon the surface of the tablecloths could be fixed permanently in place rather than being discarded with the remains of the feast, this would save much time and energy employing a multitude of skilled embroiderers toiling over such skilled work. So on one occasion the King bellowed to the craftsmen, "Why don't you fix it!" This set a number of craftsmen including Haas, Schweikhardt and Benjamin Zobel (Memmingen, Germany, September 21, 1762 – London, England, October 24, 1830), all of German origin, to, independently of each other, successfully develop suitable methods to achieve this goal, and these pictures were commissioned by the royal worthies of the day and became highly prized by the aristocracy. The King's brother, the Duke of York, commissioned a number of works by Zobel and the others, although the sand artists jealously guarded their method from their competitors. Zobel depicted "pigs in the manner of Morland"; "Nelson", the favorite dog of the Duke of York; "Tiger after George Stubbs", and an impressive "Vulture and snake." Although many of Zobel's works have survived, few of those by Haas have survived the passage of time, although observers considered his work superior to that of Zobel. This may reflect the differing techniques used by each artist. A diarist observed Zobel's coating the surface of the baseboard with a mixture of gum arabic and white lead and sprinkling sand upon the sticky surface using a folded paper funnel as a brush. He had to work quickly since the adhesive would dry in a few hours. Several of his surviving pictures have unfinished work on the reverse. Haas followed more closely the techniques developed in Japan, but mixing dry powdered gum arabic with the sand, sprinkling the mixture through a sieve and using feathers as brushes to create the pictures upon the baseboard, then fixing them by some method which he kept a secret. Due to the damp conditions in many of the stately homes of the day, his pictures failed to last more than a few years. On one occasion Haas was called away while working on an unfixed sand picture. When he returned he found one of Windsor Castle's cats curled up on the picture, thus damaging it.

Eventually Zobel returned to Memmingen in Bavaria where he continued to successfully pursue his craft. Some of his work is displayed in Memmingen Town Hall. Haas was forced to give up sand painting, probably due to the ongoing disasters with his pictures. He opened a bakery in Windsor instead, and the icing on his cakes may well have been decorated with pictures in colored sugar instead of sand.

With the passing of these Georgian craftsmen and the disposal of the Duke of York's collection the interest and skills evolved in sand picture work declined. The only Royal personage to take further interest in the craft was the late Queen Mary, consort to King George V, who bequeathed her Georgian sand paintings to the Victoria and Albert Museum, and her collection of Isle of Wight sand pictures to Carisbrooke Castle Museum on the Isle of Wight.

In the first half of the 20th century Lt. Colonel Rybot was a keen collector of sand paintings, which were the source material of the articles written on the subject in the arts and crafts magazines of the day. Eventually 37 of his collection of sand paintings were the main feature at an auction held at Sotheby's New Bond Street gallery on June 15, 1956.

=== Victorian sand picture souvenirs ===
Thousands of sites exist where it is possible to collect natural colored sands for craftwork, with an enormous range of colors being available around the globe varying with the contents of the mineral charged waters leaching through the sands. For the tourist the vertical sand cliffs at Alum Bay on the Isle of Wight form the central portion of a visual geological phenomenon (best viewed after a shower of rain) which encapsulates the chalk spires of The Needles and Tennyson Downs. Although tourists are no longer encouraged to obtain their own sand from the cliffs, numerous companies on the Island sell sand for the purpose of sandpainting.

After her marriage to Prince Albert and having chosen Osborne House near Cowes to be her new family retreat, Queen Victoria was the prime mover in the gentrification of this former backwater, local artisans benefitted from the influx of wealthy visitors, and a number of craftsmen sold their fixed sand pictures and unfixed sand jars featuring views of the Island as unique keepsakes of the Isle of Wight.

Some of these sand pictures were small and crude and left unsigned, but Edwin and John Dore of Arreton produced some fine work in the 1840s. The pictures were of postcard size and the subject matter local views such as Carisbrooke Castle, and other touristy subjects. Edwin always signed his quaint pictures in a fine hand with a mapping pen and Indian ink, one of his most successful mass-produced subjects being "Collecting birds eggs on Needles Cliffs". John Dore used a card embellished with a printed border of lace design on which to execute his sand pictures although the quality of his work was inferior to that of his brother.

Few of the Island sand artists filled in the sky, giving that detail a light colourwash as a finishing touch, sometimes leaving doors and windows free of sand which would be blocked in with Indian ink. In the 1860s and 1870s J. Symons of Cowes produced local views much larger than postcard size, mounted in glazed oak or maple frames and signed with the artist's signature on the reverse. The father and son team the Neates of Newport sold their works from a stall outside Carisbrooke Castle gates where visitors were offered sand pictures and sand jars priced from 1/- to 2/6 each and the son grew his fingernails abnormally long in order to distribute the sand on his pictures. During the 1930s and 1940s R.J.Snow of Lake came nearest to producing sand pictures in the manner of the Georgian craftsmen, but postcard size, although he did produce some fine commissioned work, particularly a view of Oddicombe in Devon, in which the sea and sky were also "painted" in sand, but after the war years the quality of the postcard sand pictures deteriorated with the mass-produced article with little taste or skill being offered for sale for a few shillings.

=== Senegal ===
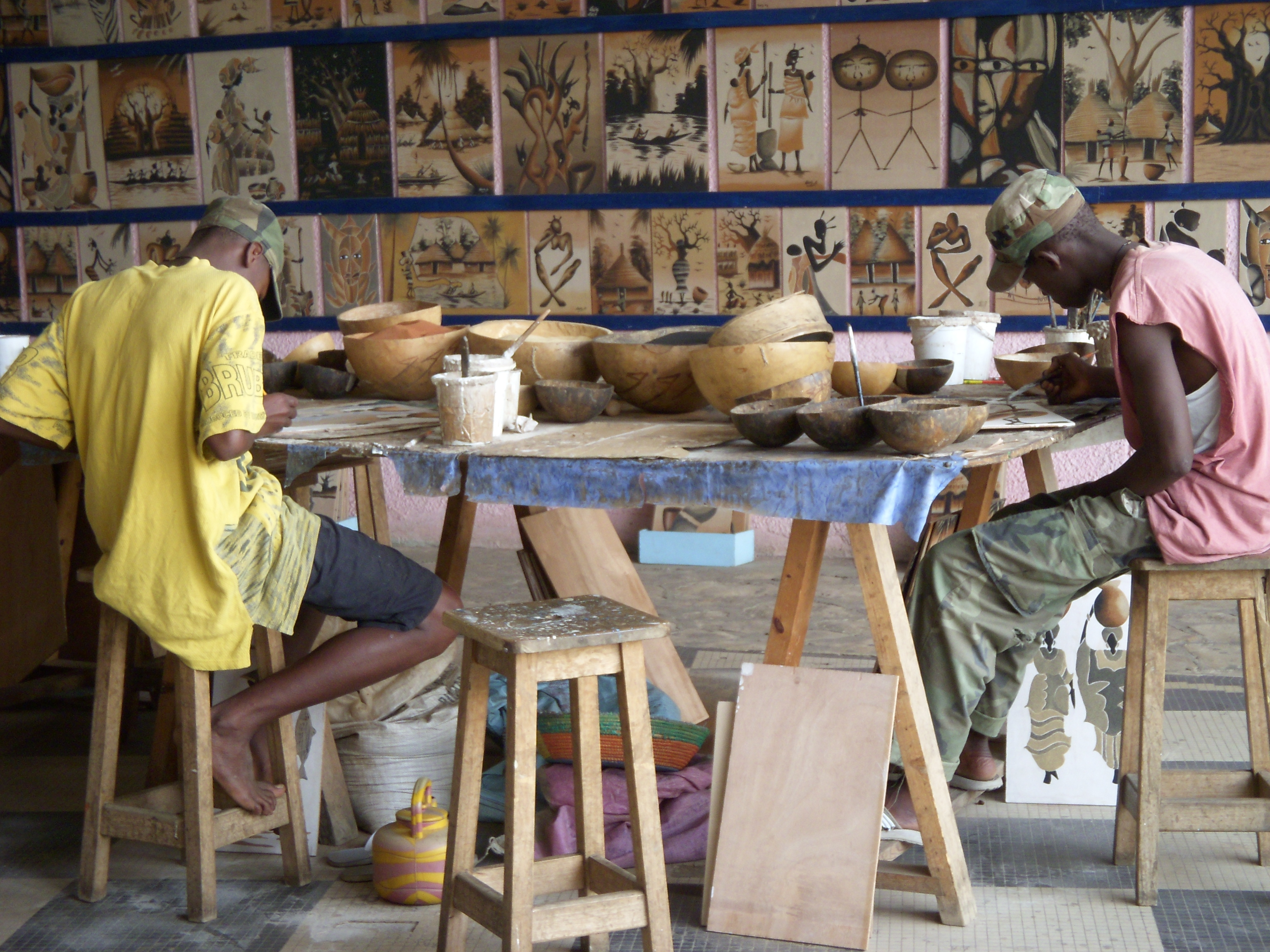
Sandpainting workshop in Dakar, Senegal

In Senegal, designs are glued to board and are typically of figures in the landscape.

=== Sand bottles ===
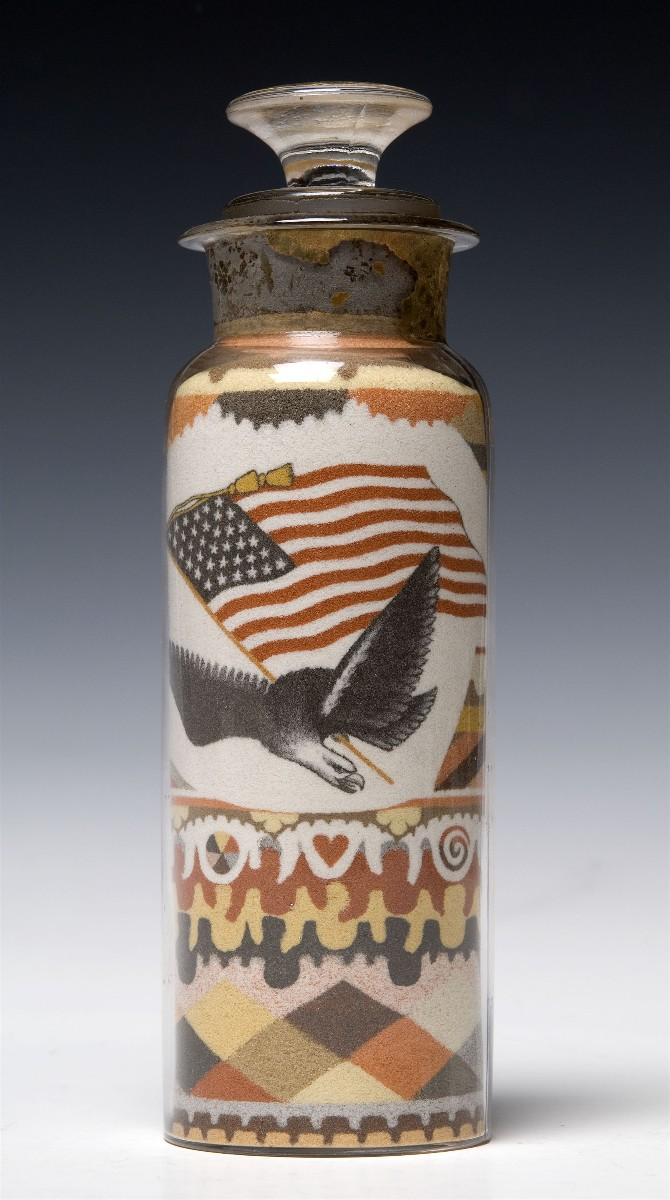
Sand bottle by Andrew Clemens, 1879

In the 1860s to 1890s, Andrew Clemens, a deaf-mute man born in Dubuque, Iowa, USA became famous for his craft of creating unfixed pictures using multicoloured sands compressed inside glass bottles or ornate chemist jars. The sand was collected from the bluffs overlooking the Mississippi River. The subjects of his sand bottles included ornately decorated sentimental verses, sailing ships, plants, animals and portraits.

He exhibited his work at the St. Louis trade fair and, having spent hours creating a picture in a bottle, would demonstrate to an incredulous audience that the picture inside was unfixed by destroying the bottle with a hammer. Clemens' sand bottles have become museum pieces and antiques which have since sold at auction for thousands of US dollars.

=== Sand carpets ===
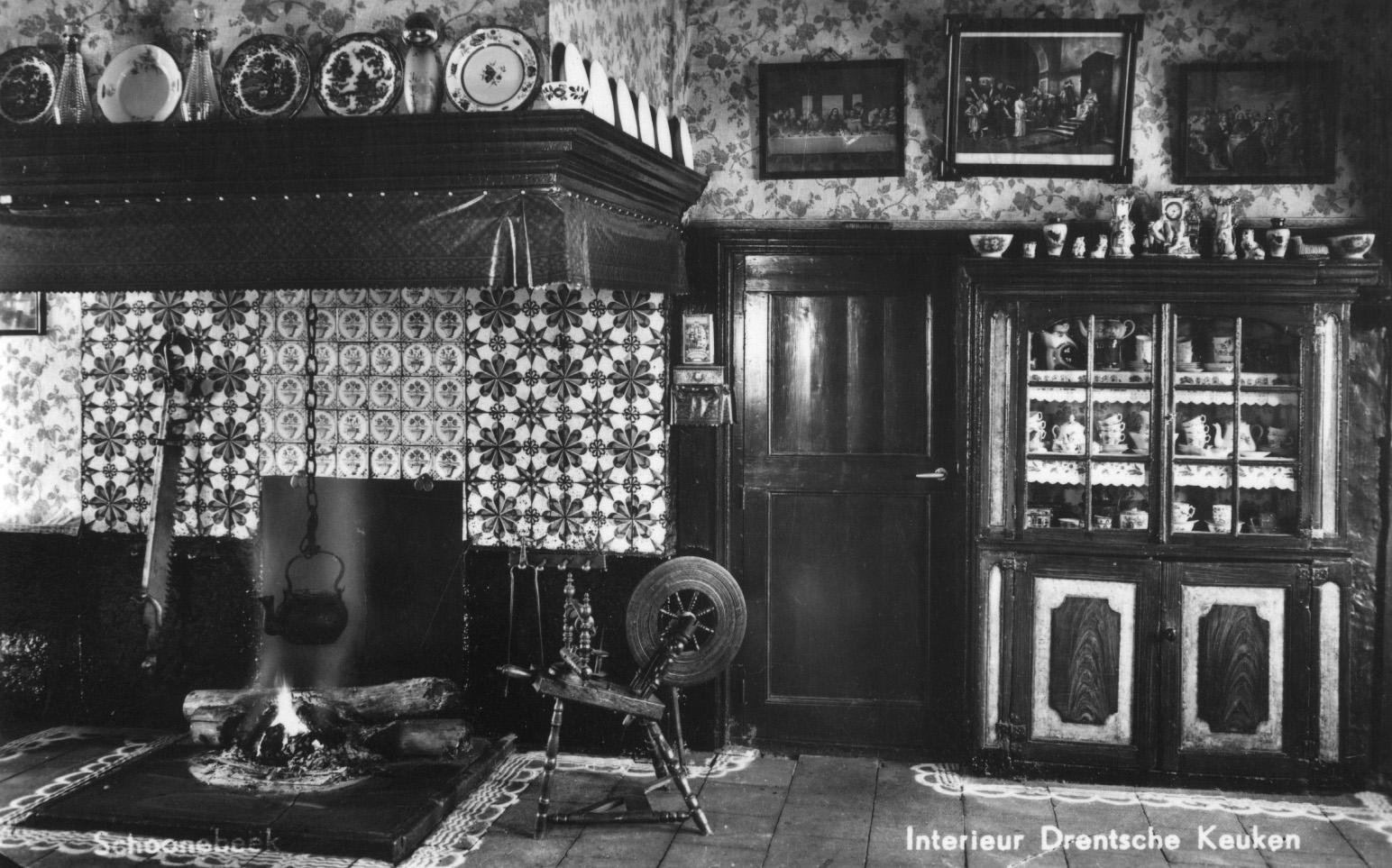
Sandpainting on the tiled floor (on the wall are handpainted decorated tiles)

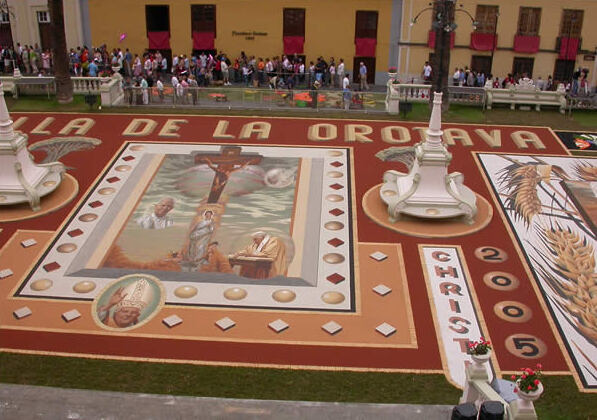
"Carpet" of land in the Town Hall Square in La Orotava Tenerife in celebration of Corpus Christi.

In the province of Drenthe in the Netherlands in the late 19th, early 20th centuries it was custom to use a stiff broom to sweep patterns in white sand to form simple decorations on the tiled floors of the houses, mostly for special occasions or celebrations. The next day it was swept up. This custom was also practiced in Northern Belgium by the Dutch speaking communities while in Hekelgem, 1973 was the centenary year of the craft of "Old Zandtapijt". The hotels and cafes would employ artisans to strew ornate sand pictures in unfixed colored sands on the tiled floors of their premises to encourage passing tourists to halt and enjoy local hospitality on their way towards Brussels. Roger de Boeck, born in 1930, was a well-respected exponent of this craft, who used glue to fix his sand pictures to a suitable base selling them to visitors to his atelier. In addition to biblical scenes, his finest works included a portrait of Queen Elizabeth 1953, and US president John Kennedy, in the early 60s. This craft continues, and a booklet to celebrate the centenary was published on February 1, 1973.

== Modern culture ==
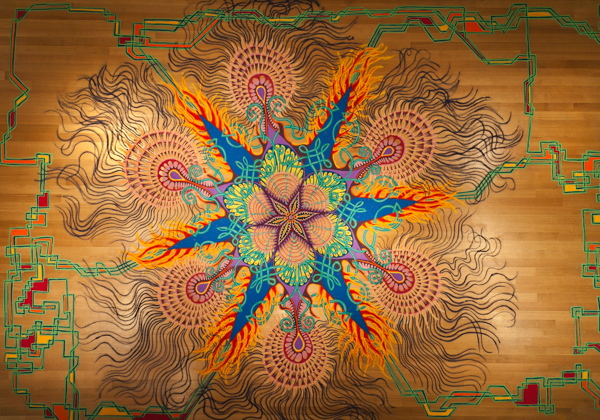
"Asynchronous Syntropy" painting using colored sand as seen at The Museum of Arts and Design "Swept Away" exhibit May 2012

In modern days, sandpainting is most often practiced during Dia de los Muertos (Day of the Dead) in Mexico and the United States. Streets are decorated with temporary sandpaintings, symbolizing the fleeting nature of life. Of note are the sandpaintings done during the Seattle Dia De Muertos Festival, but the most exciting development has been the Performance Art of Sand Animation which has created a new wave of younger artists and also revived interest in all types of sandpainting.

A number of contemporary artists use sand in ways that depart from specific cultural traditions exploring techniques by raking sand, pouring it, carving it, creating unique designs. The works are ephemeral and are primarily shared through documentation or part of a live performance.

Many of these artists were included in an exhibit at the Museum of Arts and Design in New York City titled "Swept Away: Dust, Ashes, and Dirt in Contemporary Art and Design" which was featured in the galleries in 2012. Curator David Revere McFadden described his reasoning for curating the exhibit as wanting to spotlight the work of contemporary artists who specialize in what he described as "unorthodox, unusual, or unexpected materials."

Artist included in the exhibit that use sand and techniques related to sandpainting were: Elvira Wersche, who collects sands from all over the world to create geometric patterned paintings, only to be destroyed as part of a performance. Andy Goldsworthy is known for his ephemeral works using nature, and began sand painting and drawing in 1986, documented the deterioration of a giant ball of sand on the beach packed with bones for the exhibit. Jim Denevan known for his massive raked sand paintings also shared documentation of his process on California beaches. Igor Eskinja used dust to paint an architectural floor plan in the galleries. Cui Fei produces calligraphic works in sand using tradition chak-pur and brushes. Vik Muniz uses dust, chocolate syrup, grains of sand, sugar, caviar, magazines and industrial garbage in a way that reflects sand painting. The rotating exhibit "Swept Away Projects" featured Linda Florence and Joe Mangrum whose works were added to the galleries after removal of previous works. Linda Florence used chalk to stencil patterns onto the floor and often uses various materials like sugar to create installations. Joe Mangrum poured colored sand from his hand for two consecutive days on May 8–9, 2012 he titled "Asynchronous Syntropy" and an outdoor project that acted as a circumambulation of the museum itself. Mangrum worked a total of 24 hours over the span of two days, spontaneously improvising his sandpainting design, only to have it quickly disappear under the bustle of Columbus Circle foot traffic.

Other contemporary artists who work with sand include Andrew van der Merwe, based in Cape Town, who carves calligraphic imagery into the sand on beaches; Andres Amador, an American artist who rakes designs into beaches; Ahmad Nadalian, an Iranian artist who uses natural ground pigments to paint with sand; and Motoi Yamamoto, who makes paintings reflecting typhoons and natural phenomena using salt.

=== Present-day sandpainting techniques ===
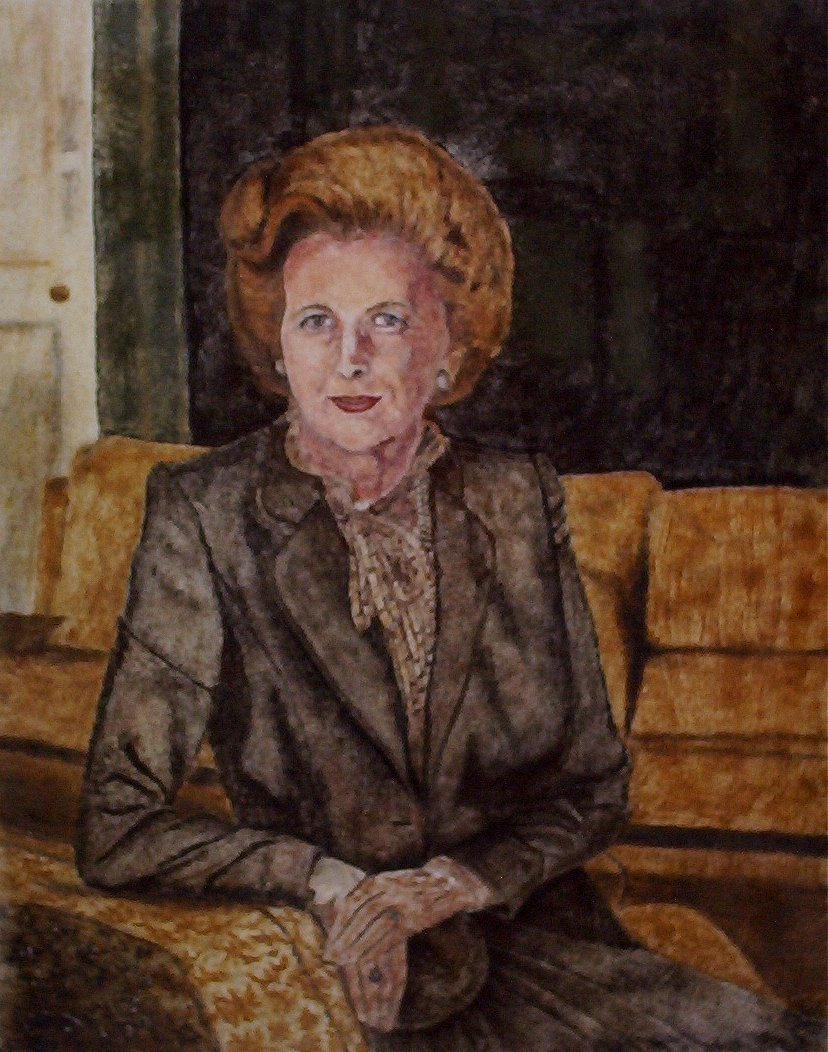
Brian Pike's 1985 portrait of Margaret Thatcher incorporates magnetized iron filings in the composition

Most artists use naturally occurring oxidized and mineral-charged colored sands, adding powdered charcoal to widen the palette and in some instances idiosyncratic materials such as iron filings or discarded stonemasons' dust from ecclesiastical sites. Other artists use industrial tinted quartz sands with a capacity to resist weathering, and a new generation of strong adhesives. The work is protected with a coat of spray varnish. No protective glass frame is needed with the sands and the adhesives since the paintings have proved to resist the effect of direct sunlight without any yellowing of the varnish.

== See also ==
- Other sandpaintings
  - Kolam
  - Sand mandala
  - Marmotinto
  - Rangoli (Indian sandpainting)
  - Yantra
- Bonkei (Japanese dry tray landscapes)
- Process art
- Sand animation
- Sand drawing
- Sawdust carpet
- Flower carpet

== Sources ==
- Eugene Baatsoslanii Joe, Mark Bahti, Oscar T. Branson, Navajo Sandpainting Art, (Treasure Chest Publications, Inc, 1978.) ISBN 0-918080-20-7
- Gold, Peter (1994). Navajo & Tibetan sacred wisdom: the circle of the spirit. Inner Traditions/Bear. ISBN 0-89281-411-X. Rochester, Vermont: Inner Traditions International.
- Villasenor, David. Tapestries in Sand: The Spirit of Indian Sandpainting. California, Naturegraph Company, Inc. 1966.
- Wilson, Joseph A.P. "Relatives Halfway Round The World: Southern Athabascans and Southern Tarim Fugitives", Limina, 11. 2005. pp. 67–78. URL: https://web.archive.org/web/20060821192325/http://limina.arts.uwa.edu.au/__data/page/90432/wilson.pdf
- Arthur Morrison. Japanese Sand-Pictures pp. 609–612. Strand Magazine, 1909.
- G. B. Hughes. Decorating the Georgian Dessert Table. Country Life, May 21, 1959.
- F.C.H. Marmortinto or Sandpainting. Notes and Queries, pp217/8 11 March 1854
- J. Mummery. Marmortinto or Sandpainting.Notes and Queries, pp327/8 8 April 1854
- Fred Lee Carter. The "Lost Art" of sandpainting pp. 215–221. The Connoisseur Illustrated, 1927.
- Fred Lee Carter. Sand Pictures. Notes and Queries, December 8, 1928.
- E. McCoy. Pictures Painted with Sand. Antiques, March 1936.
- Bea Howe. Sand Pictures. Homes and Gardens, April 1940.
- D. A. Ponsonby. A Sand Painter and Morland pp. 111–113. The Connoisseur-American Edition, April 1955.
- Lt.-Colonel Rybot. Auction of Sand Paintings. Sotherby and Co, June 15, 1956
- S. Groves. They Painted in Sand. The Lady, January 22, 1959.
- J. Toller. The Regency and Victorian Crafts. Ward Lock, 1969.
- C. P. Woodhouse. The Victoriana Collectors Handbook. Bell, 1970.
- Bea Howe. Antiques from the Victorian Home. Batsford, 1973.
- J. Field. Victorian Crafts. Heinemann, 1973.
- Brian Pike sand painter. Painting with Sand-Golden Hands Crafts-vol.70. Marshall Cavendish, 1976.
- Joyce Eley. Sand Pictures. Wight Life, Oct-Nov. 1974.
- A. H. Trelawny. Keepsake Castles in the Sand. Country Life, February 2, 1995.
- Etienne le compte. 1873 - 1973 Oud Zandtapijt published Hekelgem February 1, 1973.
- Villasenor, David & Jean. How to do Permanent Sand Paintings. Villasenor, David & Jean, 1972.
- K. Beese. Sand Painting Techniques. Design 60, 1959.
- P. Nelson. Sandpainting. Creative Crafts, April 1974.
- Brian Pike. Sand Art.Family Circle Book of Crafts, 1980.
- Brian Pike. The Craft of Sandpainting.The Craftsman Magazine, 1989.
