= Sand drawing =

Artistic and ritual tradition and practice of Vanuatu

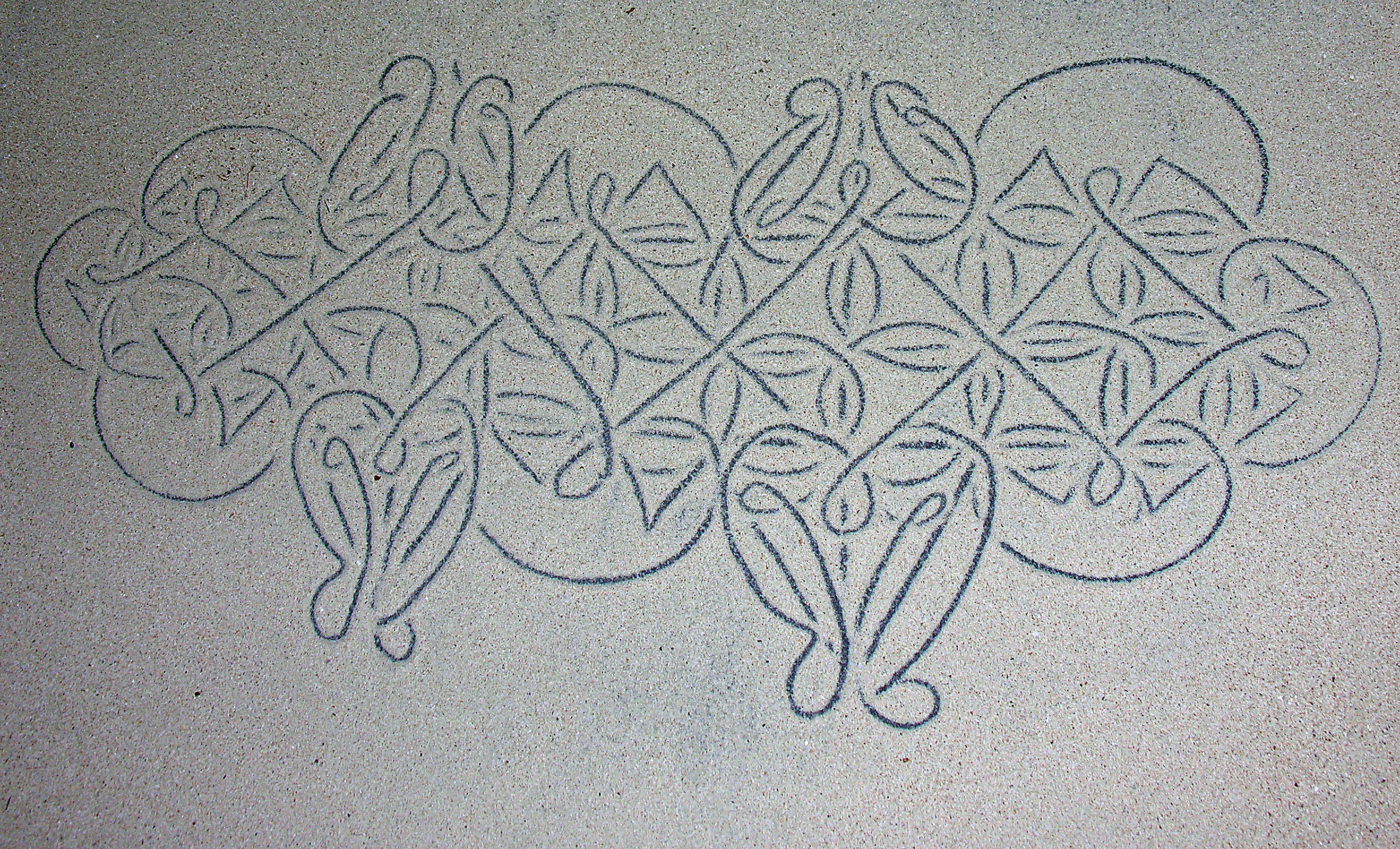
Sand drawing in Vanuatu (2007)

Sand drawing (or sandroing in Bislama) is a ni-Vanuatu artistic and ritual tradition and practice, recognised by UNESCO as a Masterpiece of the Oral and Intangible Heritage of Humanity.

Another form of art which implies drawing in the sand is sandpainting, but this process also implies the coloring of sand to create a colorful environment on a small or a large scale. This form of sand art has been heavily recorded amongst the Navajo people of the American south west.

== Description ==
Sand drawing is produced in sand, volcanic ash or clay. It consists of "a continuous meandering line on an imagined grid to produce a graceful, often symmetrical, composition of geometric patterns". The artist's implement is a single finger.

UNESCO describes sand drawing as:

A rich and dynamic graphic tradition [which] has developed as a means of communication among the members of some 80 different language groups inhabiting the central and northern islands of Vanuatu. The drawings also function as mnemonic devices to record and transmit rituals, mythological lore and a wealth of oral information about local histories, cosmologies, kinship systems, song cycles, farming techniques, architectural and craft design, and choreographic patterns. Most sand drawings possess several functions and layers of meaning: they can be “read” as artistic works, repositories of information, illustration for stories, signatures, or simply messages and objects of contemplation.

Artists such as Pablo Picasso were known for drafting their visual ideas in the sand. Norman Joseph Woodland, inventor of the barcode, came up with his invention by drawing it in the sand.

=== Vanuatu (Sandroings) ===
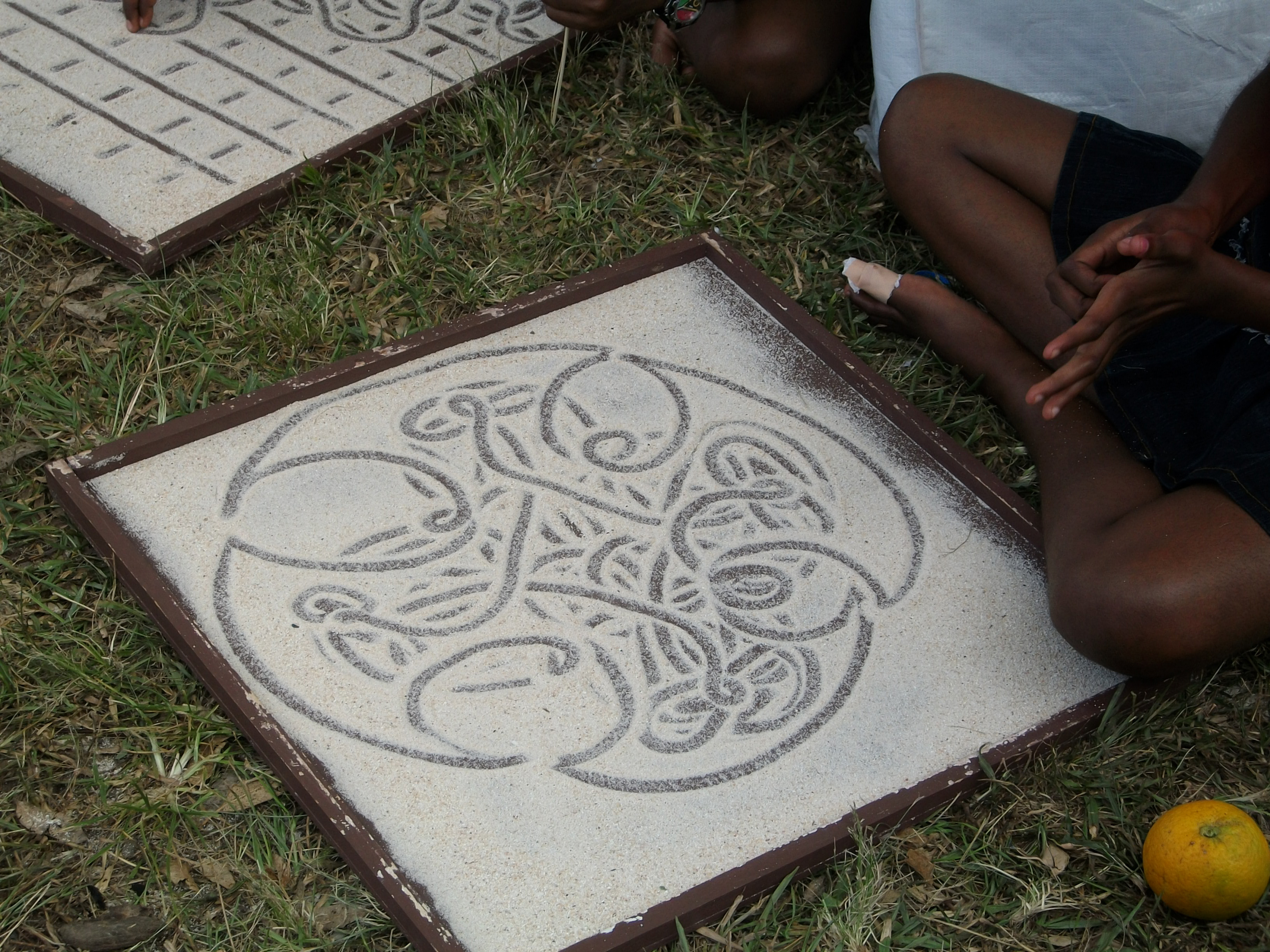
Traditional sand drawing in Vanuatu

The Vanuatu Cultural Centre has noted that the spirit of sand drawing tends to disappear, only a few practitioners still master the special techniques of sand drawing. Nowadays, this form of art is mainly used as a graphic layout for advertising or tourism ends, and its original sense and purpose is getting lost. A National Action Plan for the Safeguarding of Sand Drawing has been initiated by the centre, together with the Save Sand Drawings Action Committee; the programme is sponsored by UNESCO. The project notably led to a National Sand Drawing Festival, as from 2004.

The Turaga indigenous movement based on Pentecost Island write using Avoiuli, an alphabet inspired by designs found in traditional sand drawings. Sand drawing is interpreted as a key visual medium in a country where more than 100 languages are spoken.

Since the traditional art of sand drawing is so precisely geometrical, academic research is being led to associate the (ethno-) mathematical patterns held in this art, and correlate it with modern mathematics to get a sense of the potential scientific knowledge carried by the builders of the civilizations practicing it.

The ancient Greek mathematician studying geometry by drawing figures in the sand also leads to the idea that traditional Sandroings convey much more than a pleasing visual effect.

== Correlated forms of art ==
The sand-drawing practice shares common features with the Indian Kolams because of the geometry-driven shapes it delivers through the tracing of a continuous line on the ground. The work of making patterns in the sand with a rake is also evocative of the Karesansui practice in traditional Japanese rock gardens, and of the large scale Nazca Lines in Peru.

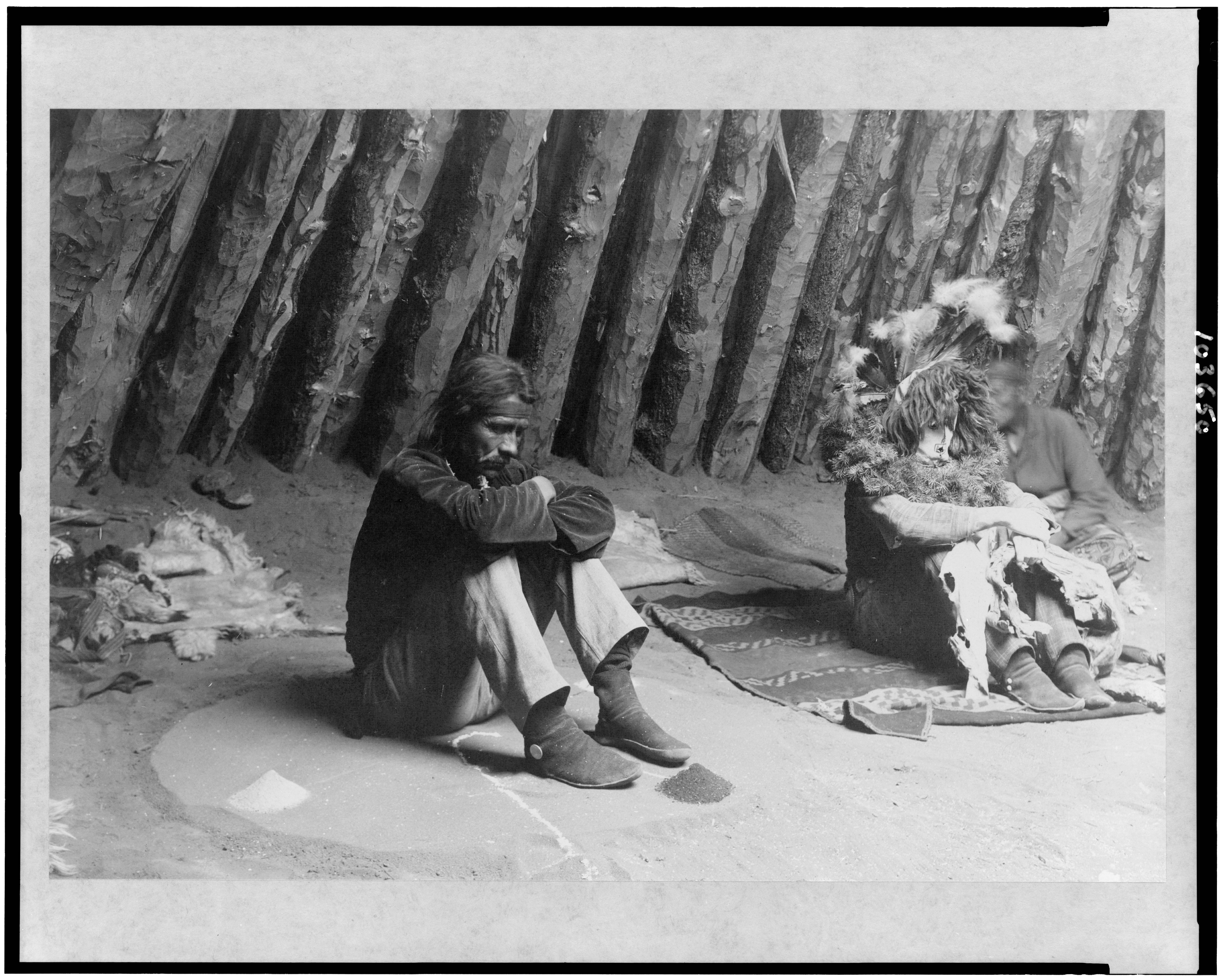
Patient on sand painting

=== Navajo Sand Painting ===
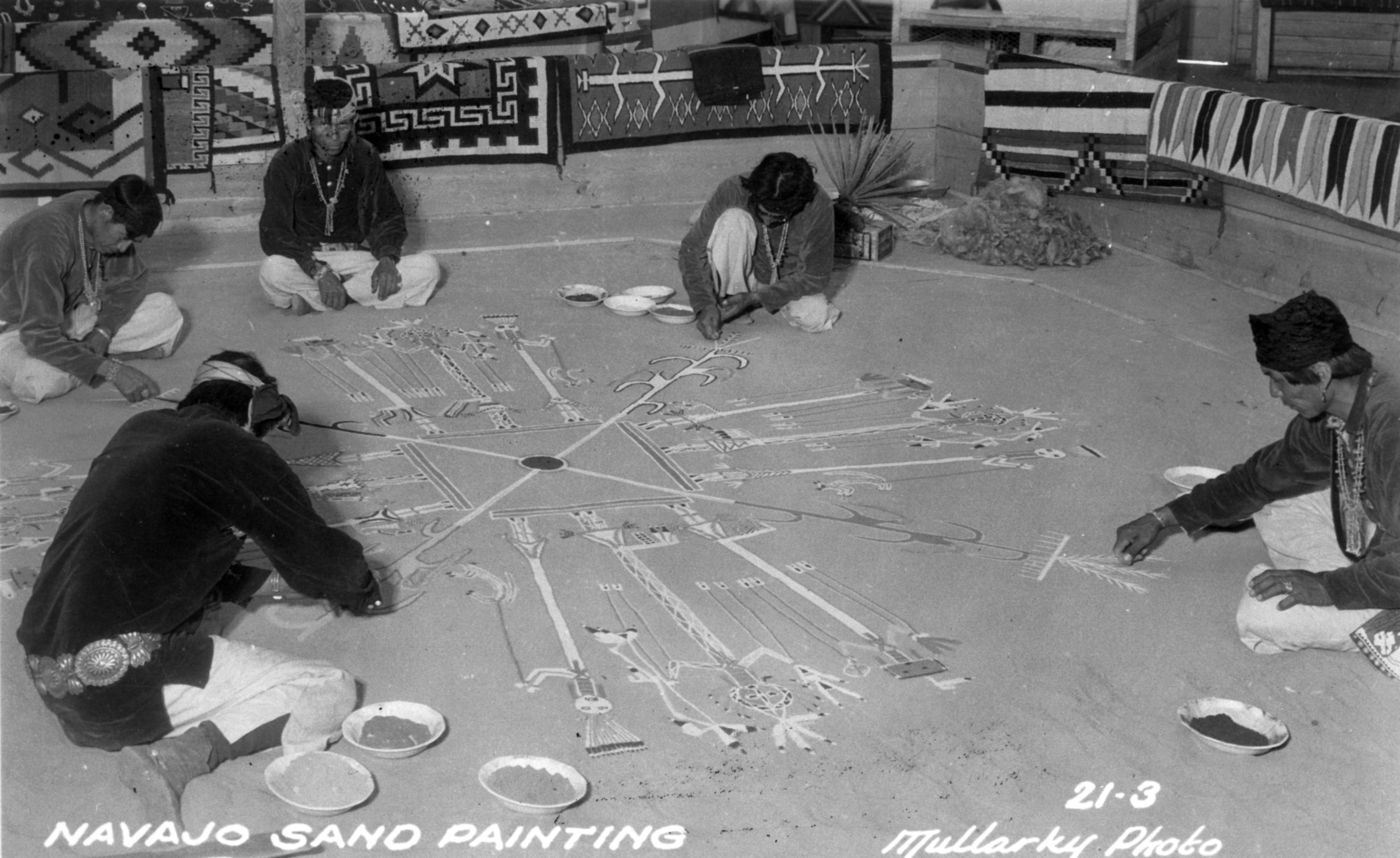
Creating a Sand Painting

The Sand Painting of the Navajo people is a well-known example of using different colors of sand to create imagery. These paintings are made by a Navajo Medicine Man and the creation of the images is often accompanied by a ceremony. In one such ceremony called the Yebatchai, family and friends come together to construct a new hogan (home) in which they aim to heal a sick member of the community with the help of the Medicine Man. On part of the floor they lay out locally derived yellow sand and invite the Medicine Man and his assistants to begin their process of creating imagery using colored sands over the yellow background. The creation of this sand painting must only begin once the sun has risen in the morning and the painting is traditionally destroyed before sundown after it has been "used" within the healing ceremony. During the nine day ceremony, three to four sand paintings may be created and destroyed and at some points the sick person may be placed on top of the image. Various sands are then placed on and around the individual. During the destruction of the sand paintings, some of the various colored sands are taken by the Medicine man and spread in the four directions as a prayer is said.

Due to the temporary nature of Navajo sand imagery in the ceremonial sense, they are not a commodifiable art to trade and sell. In response to increasing demand for Navajo art from White Americans in the 20th century, some Navajo weavers created blankets that resemble sand paintings. In order to cater to the demand while avoiding the blasphemy of saving the sand images after sundown, weaving artists have often intentionally changed details of original sand paintings.

=== Pitjantjatjara (Milpatjunanyi) ===
In the Pitjantjatjara dialect of North Central Australia, the word Milpatjunanyi means "the art of telling stories in the sand". In this culture, the storytellers, often women, have a ritual approach to the process, using a stick that is first pressed against the body to create a connection, and also used as a drumstick to bring musical rhythm to the story. The sand drawing communication technique is also used in schools.

== See also ==
- Sandpainting
- Kolam – Tamil sandpainting
- Sand mandala (Tibetan)
