= Sand mandala =

Tibetan Buddhist tradition

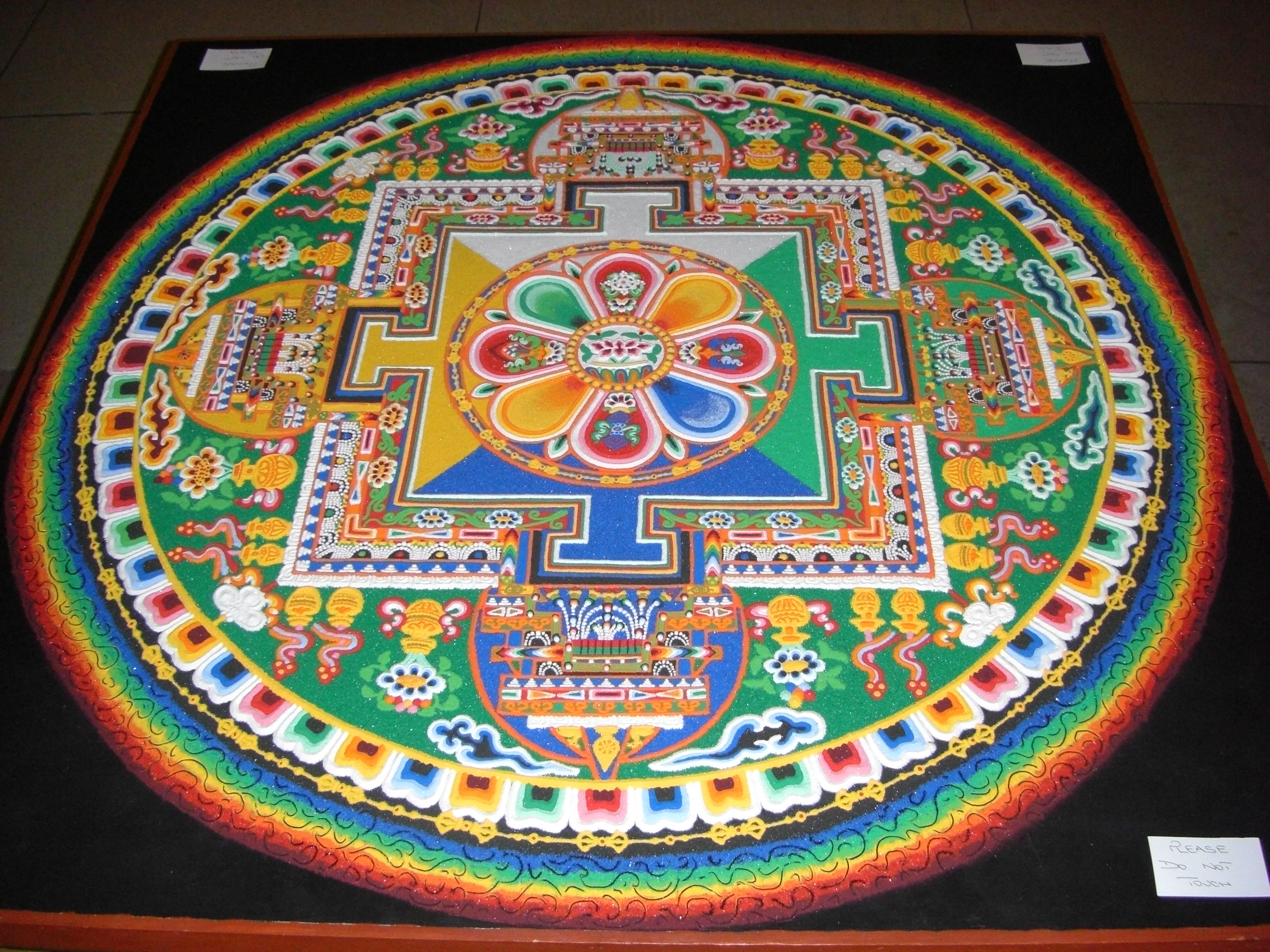
Chenrezig Sand Mandala created and exhibited by the House of Commons of the United Kingdom for the visit of the 14th Dalai Lama, May 2008.

Sand mandala (Tibetan: དཀྱིལ་འཁོར།, Wylie: dkyil 'khor, THL kyinkhor; Chinese: 沙壇城/壇城沙畫) is a Tibetan Buddhist tradition involving the creation and destruction of mandalas made from colored sand. Once complete, the sand mandala's ritualistic dismantling is accompanied by ceremonies and viewing to symbolize Buddhist doctrinal belief in the transitory nature of material life.

== Materials and construction ==
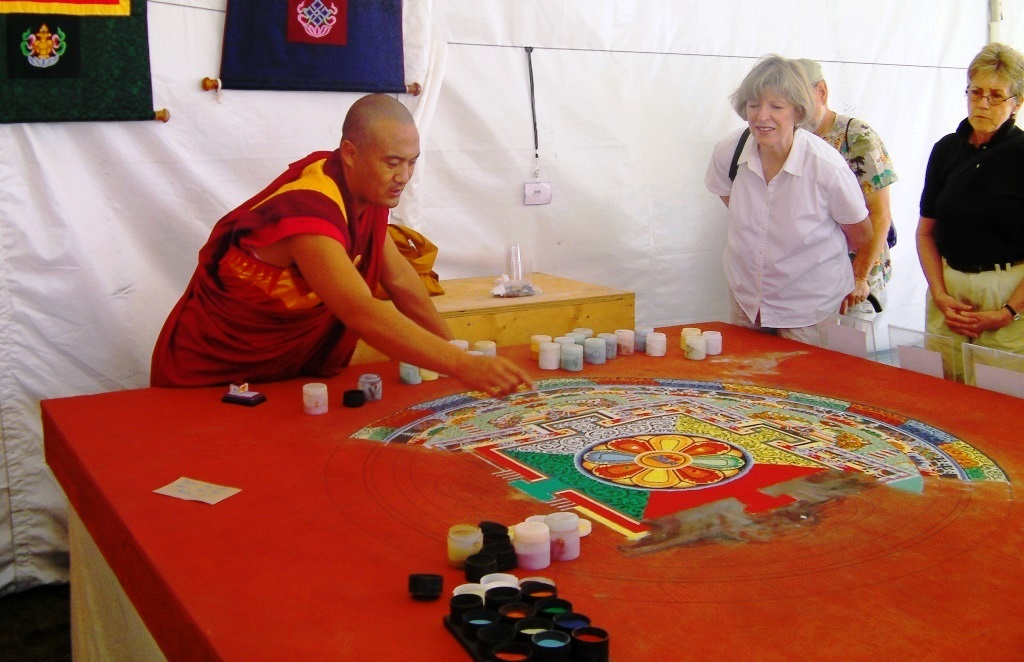
Tibetan Monk creating sand mandala. Washington, D.C.

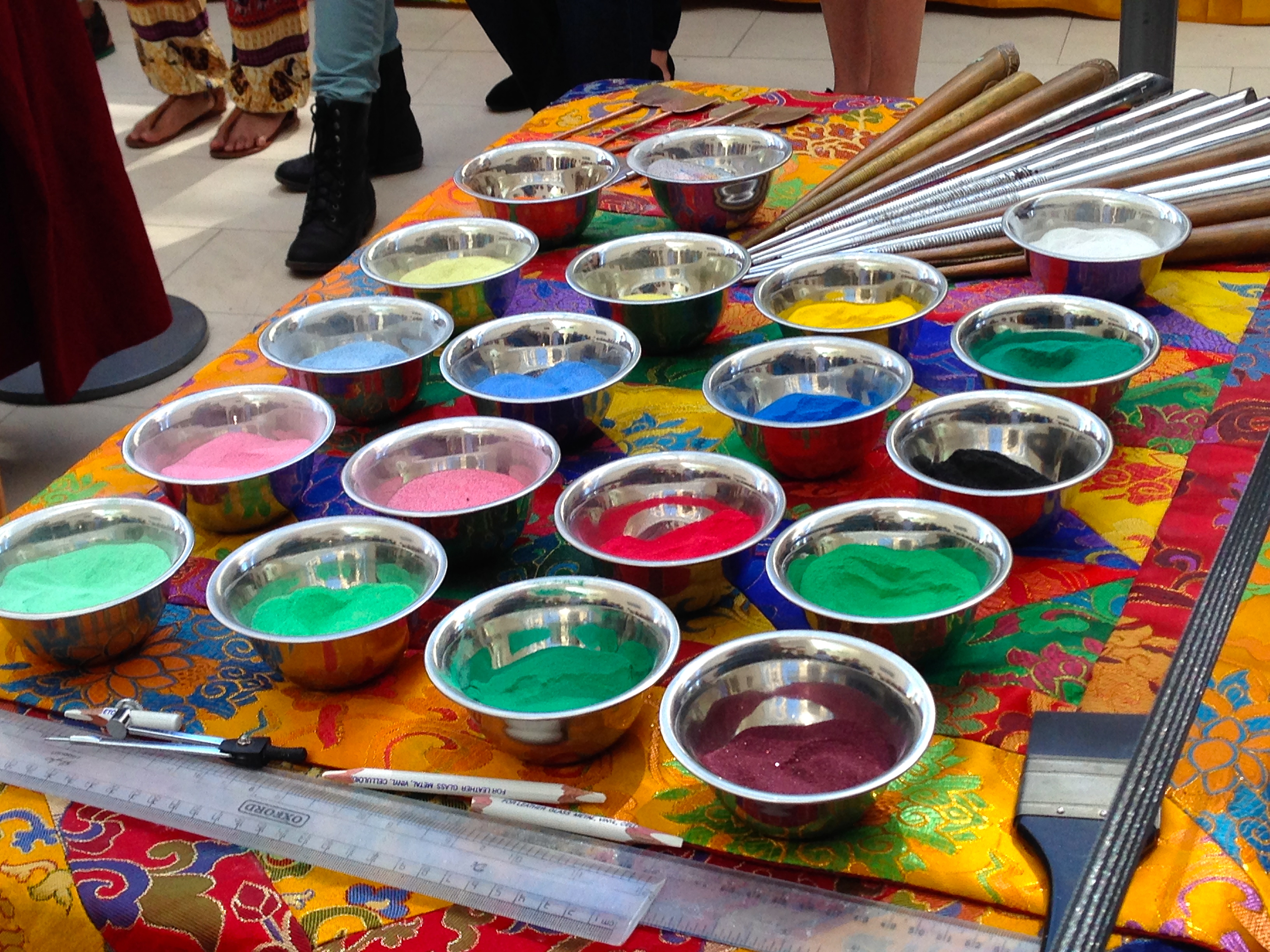
Materials and tools used to create sand mandala

Historically, the mandala was not created with naturally dyed sand, but granules of crushed colored stone. In modern times, plain white stones are ground down and dyed with opaque inks to achieve the same effect. The monks use a special, extremely dense sand in order to limit interference by things such as wind or sneezes. Before laying down the sand, the monks assigned to the project will draw the geometric measurements associated with the mandala. The sand granules are then applied using small tubes, funnels, and scrapers, called chak-pur, until the desired pattern is achieved. Sand mandalas traditionally take several weeks to build due to the large amount of work involved in laying down the sand in such intricate detail. It is common that a team of monks will work together on the project, creating one section of the diagram at a time, working from the middle outwards.

== Themes ==
The Kalachakra Mandala for instance, contains 722 deities portrayed within the complex structure and geometry of the mandala itself. Other smaller mandalas, such as the one attributed to Vajrabhairava, contain significantly fewer deities and require less geometry, but still take several days to complete. Like all mandalas, these are meant as two-dimensional representations of what is supposed to be a three-dimensional environment. Various buildings have been suggested to be three-dimensional mandalas, such as Borobodur in Java, Indonesia, and the Bayon in Siem Reap, Cambodia, although no academic consensus on either has yet been reached.

Many sand mandala contain a specific outer locality which is clearly identified as a charnel ground.

The colors for the painting are usually made with naturally colored sand, crushed gypsum (white), yellow ocher, red sandstone, charcoal, and a mixture of charcoal and gypsum (blue). Mixing red and black can make brown, red and white make pink. Other coloring agents include corn meal, flower pollen, or powdered roots and bark.

== Ritual destruction ==
The destruction of a sand mandala is highly ceremonial. Even the deity syllables are removed in a specific order along with the rest of the geometry until at last the mandala has been dismantled to show impermanence. The sand is collected in a jar which is then wrapped in silk and transported to a river (or any place with moving water), where it is released back into nature to disperse the healing energies of the mandala to sentient beings in water and throughout the world.

== Notable sand mandala artists ==
- Dalai Lama
- Losang Samten

== See also ==
- Sandpainting
- Sand drawing (Vanuatu)
