= Pearl Grobet-Secrétan =

Swiss suffragist (1904–1988)

- Born: Pearl Secrétan; 28 December 1904; London, England
- Died: 28 December 1988 (aged 84); Geneva, Switzerland
- Education: University of London; Columbia University
- Occupation: Suffragist
- Political party: Social Democratic Party of Switzerland
- Spouse: Édouard Grobet
- Children: 3 (including Christian Grobet)
- Relatives: Charles Secrétan and John Morgan Richards (great-uncles); John Oliver Hobbes (first cousin once removed)

Pearl Grobet-Secrétan (née Secrétan; 28 December 1904 – 28 December 1988) was a Swiss suffragist. After spending some time in the United States, she began campaigning for woman's suffrage in Switzerland, eventually culminating in the successful 1971 Swiss women's suffrage referendum. She also campaigned for family planning and the abolition of apartheid and was a United Nations delegate for the International Federation for Human Rights and Women's International League for Peace and Freedom.

== Biography ==
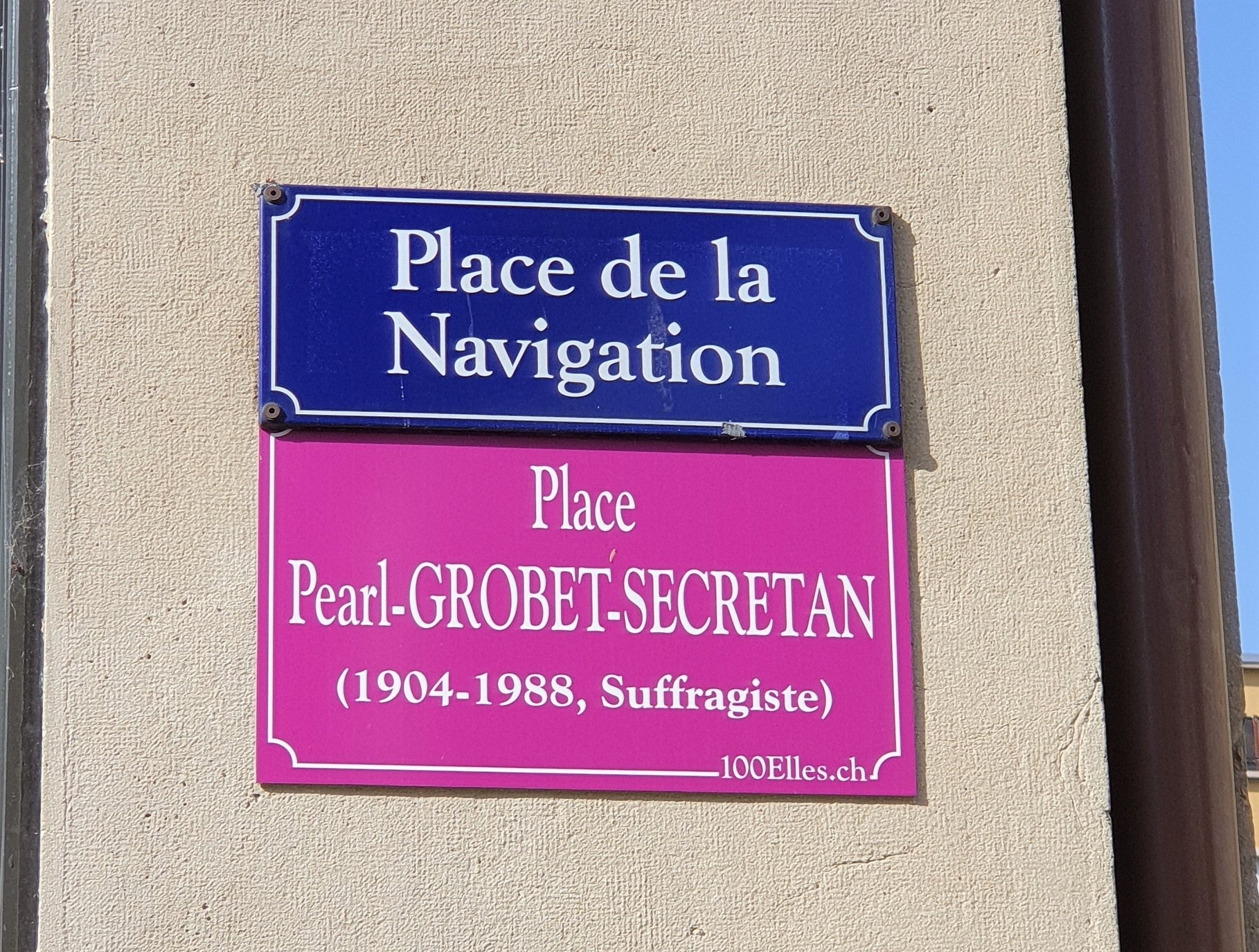
Plaque honouring Grobet-Secrétan in Les Pâquis, Geneva

Pearl Secrétan was born in London on 28 December 1904. Her father Adolphe-Antony Secrétan was a businessman who spent "several years [...] engaged in manufactures in England". Her mother Laura Clarke was a native of Naples, New York, Her paternal great-uncle Charles Secrétan was a philosopher. Among her maternal relatives were her great-uncle, businessman John Morgan Richards, and her first cousin once removed, writer John Oliver Hobbes.

She was educated at the University of London, where she learned about the women's political rights movement and obtained her degree in letters in 1922. She later continued her education abroad in the United States, where she obtained her master's degree at Columbia University, taught French at Sarah Lawrence College and the Packer Collegiate Institute, and volunteered for the American Red Cross during World War II. She lived in Geneva by 1947.

As part of the Swiss Association for Women's Suffrage, she campaigned for woman's suffrage in Switzerland, including during the unsuccessful 1959 Swiss women's suffrage referendum, before the successful 1971 Swiss women's suffrage referendum. After the Canton of Geneva adopted women's suffrage in 1960, she unsuccessfully ran as a Social Democratic Party of Switzerland in the 1961 Grand Council of Geneva election.

Grobet-Secrétan's advocacy led to the creation of the Family Information and Birth Regulation Center, an institution from the Grand Council of Geneva which promotes family planning, and the inclusion of parent–teacher associations in school-themed debates. She was part of the World Conference on Women, 1985 and the international anti-apartheid movement, and she served as a United Nations delegate for the International Federation for Human Rights and Women's International League for Peace and Freedom.

She married Édouard Grobet, a great-grandson of inventor François-Louis Grobet, and they had three children (including politician Christian Grobet) before they divorced at some time before 1961. Grobet-Secrétan died in Geneva on 26 March 1988.
