= Grobet =

Grobet is a surname. Notable people with the surname include:

- Christian Grobet (1941–2023), Swiss politician
- Ernesto Grobet (1909–1969), Mexican cyclist
- Lourdes Grobet (1940–2022), Mexican painter and photographer
- Pearl Grobet-Secrétan (1904–1988), Swiss suffragist

== See also ==
- Xavier Pérez Grobet (born 1964), Mexican cinematographer, son of Lourdes Grobet
- Musée Grobet-Labadié, a museum in Marseille, France
- André Grobéty (1933–2013), Swiss footballer
- Anne-Lise Grobéty (1949–2010), Swiss journalist, poet and writer
