= Ventnor =

Town on the Isle of Wight, England

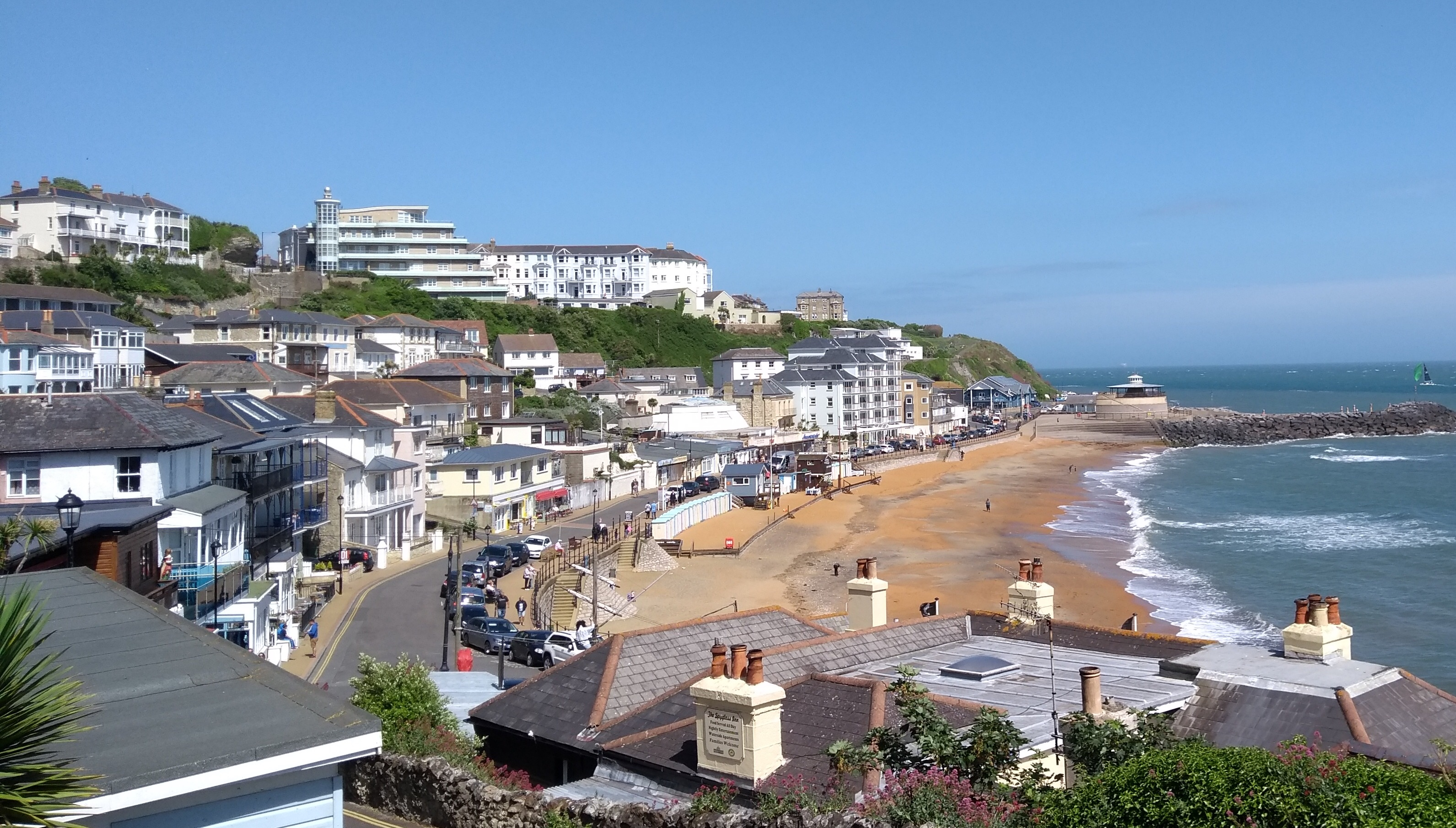
- Ventnor seafront, June 2018

- Location within the Isle of Wight
- Area: 0.980 sq mi (2.54 km^{2})
- Population: 5,567 (2021 Census)
  - Density: 5,681/sq mi (2,193/km^{2})
- OS grid reference: SZ562775
- Unitary authority: Isle of Wight
- Ceremonial county: Isle of Wight
- Region: South East
- Country: England
- Sovereign state: United Kingdom
- Post town: VENTNOR
- Postcode district: PO38
- Dialling code: 01983
- Police: Hampshire and Isle of Wight
- Fire: Hampshire and Isle of Wight
- Ambulance: Isle of Wight
- UK Parliament: Isle of Wight East

Ventnor (/ˈvɛntnər/) is a seaside resort town and civil parish established in the Victorian era on the southeast coast of the Isle of Wight, England, 11 miles (18 km) from Newport. It is situated south of St Boniface Down, and built on steep slopes leading down to the sea. The higher part is referred to as Upper Ventnor (officially Lowtherville); the lower part, where most amenities are located, is known as Ventnor. Ventnor is sometimes taken to include the adjacent older settlements of St Lawrence and Bonchurch, which are covered by its town council. The population is 5,567 according to the 2021 Census.

Ventnor became extremely fashionable as both a health and holiday resort in the late 19th century, described as the 'English Mediterranean' and 'Mayfair by the Sea'. Medical advances during the early twentieth century reduced its role as a health resort and, like other British seaside resorts, its summer holiday trade suffered from the changing nature of travel during the latter part of the century.

Its relatively sheltered location beneath the hilly chalk downland and south-facing orientation towards the English Channel produces a microclimate with more sunny days and fewer frosts than the rest of the island. This allows many species of subtropical plant to flourish; Ventnor Botanic Garden is particularly notable.

== Name ==
The name is probably a manorial name, referring to an estate owned by a family called Vintner. Vintner derives from the Middle English vintener (Old French vintenier) meaning 'military officer in charge of 20 men', when, in Medieval times, the Island was divided into nine districts for military defence. A vintener would be in charge of each one. In Anglo-Saxon times it was called Holeweia (1189–1204), Holleweye (1287–1290), and Holloway (1553), from Old English hol and weg, meaning the hollow way (path) or the way (path) in a hollow, or it could derive from a Holy Well spring on Ventnor Downs.

== History ==
While Bonchurch and St Lawrence both have churches dating back to the Norman era, the area in between that became Ventnor was unremarkable until the 19th century.

There are indications of Bronze Age settlement, with burial mounds on the nearby downs, and excavations have evidenced small scale settlement in the area during both the Iron Age and the early Roman period. These include middens and palaeoenvironmental deposits at Binnel Bay, Woody Bay, St Catherine's Point and Rocken End. The Isle of Wight was the last part of England to be converted to Christianity, and Saint Boniface is believed to have preached locally in the 8th century. During the 13th century, the area was covered by the manors of Holloway and Steephill, both belonging to the Lisle family.

A 1992 archaeological survey found evidence of a medieval settlement at Flowers Brook, which was referred to in a 1327 subsidy roll as Villata de steple. This area was subsequently incorporated into two farms, with some cottages on the site demolished in 1834. Ventnor watermill, on a site just north of the current cascade, is first mentioned in 1327, was destroyed by fire in 1848, rebuilt by 1853, and demolished in 1875.

In the early nineteenth century, in addition to the mill, Ventnor consisted solely of a few fishermen's huts by the cove, a couple of inns, and a farm. In 1804, it was described by John Britton as a "hamlet...formed by a range of neat cottages chiefly inhabited by fishermen, open to the sea in front, and backed by woods and the high downs". The area was divided between the parishes of Godshill and Newchurch. In 1820 both of the manors (Holloway was then known as Ventnor Manor) were sold to John Hamborough and other building speculators. The spur for expansion was the publication in 1830 of the second edition of physician James Clark's book: The influence of climate on disease. This identified the microclimate of Ventnor and the Undercliff as ideal for people with chest complaints ("nothing along the south coast will bear comparison with it", Clark enthused), at a time when consumption (now known as TB) was a common cause of death.

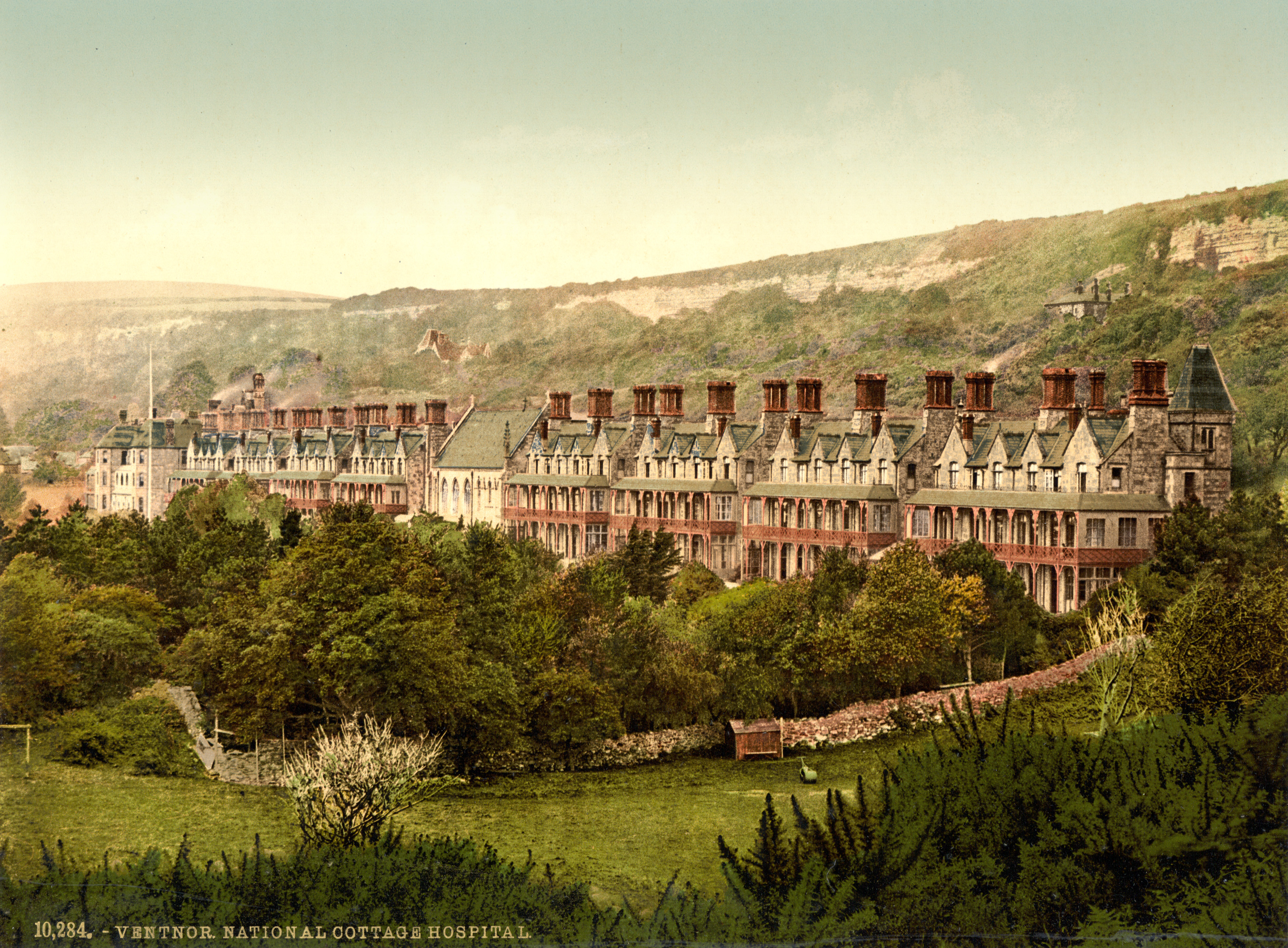
Cottage Hospital, Ventnor, c. 1899

Thereafter Ventnor developed very rapidly into a town, with numerous hotels and boarding houses targeting sick visitors, particularly during the winter, and a wider range of shops than would be expected for a town of its size (by 1891 it had four chemists). In 1844 Parliament passed an Act "for better paving, lighting, cleansing, and otherwise improving part of the parish of Newchurch, called Ventnor, and for establishing a market therein". However, not everyone was enamoured with the fast-growing town: in 1845, after recounting the positive reviews of others, writer John Gwilliam complained of the "intolerable" summer heat and the chalk dust about the town, concluding that to live there would "be one of the greatest punishments that could be inflicted upon me in the Isle of Wight".

In 1853 the first newspaper on the island, the Ventnor Mercury, was launched (it continued publication until 1985). In 1869 Dr Arthur Hill Hassall opened the Royal National Hospital for Diseases of the Chest in St Lawrence, and many local buildings date from the 1860s, by when the current commercial centre of the town was already substantially developed. The later nineteenth century also saw development aimed at wealthier holidaymakers from Britain and Europe, as British seaside resorts generally became very popular.

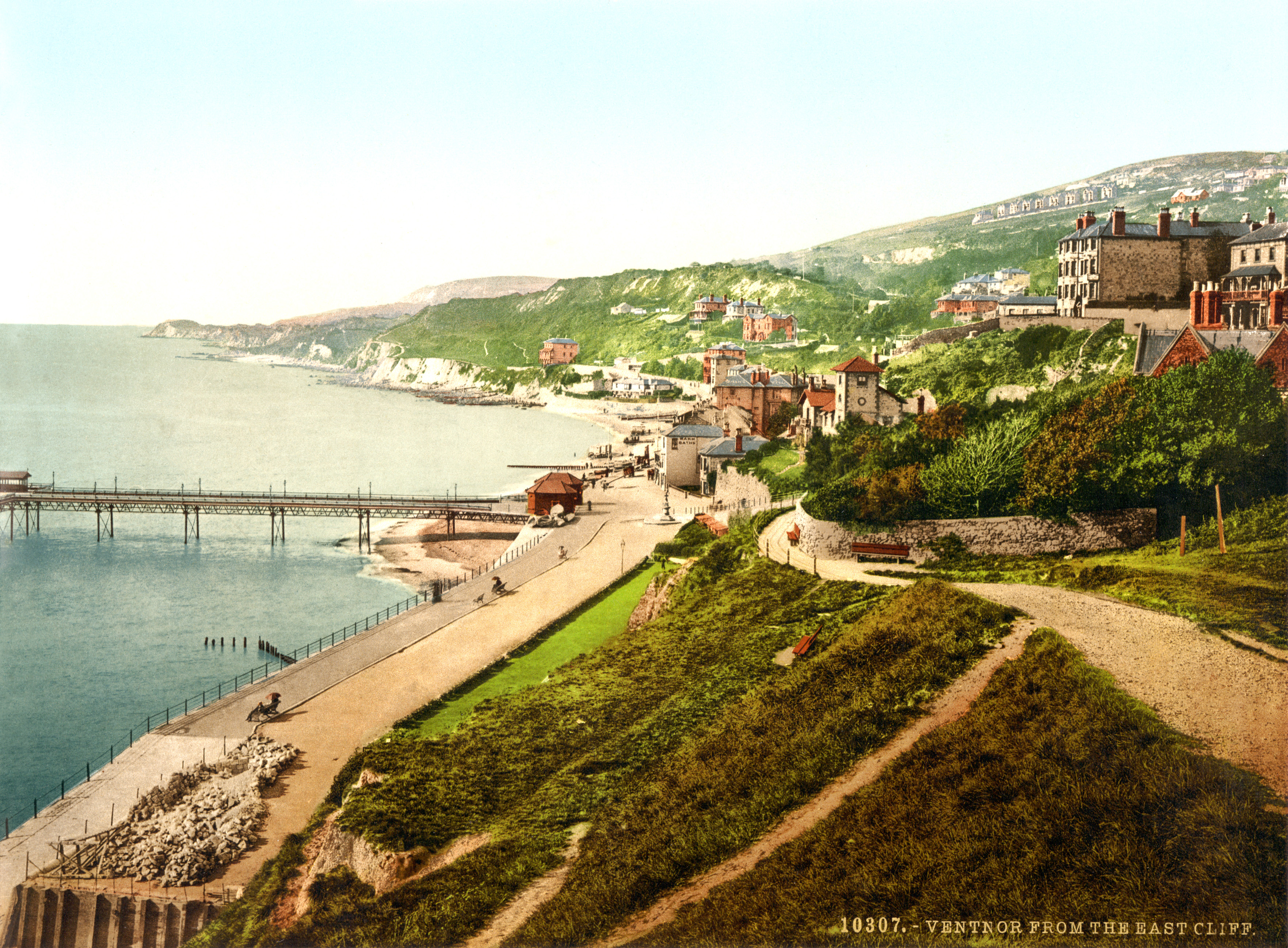
Photochrom of Ventnor, 1899

The first pier from 1860 was washed away. Breakwaters were built in 1863, and by the following year, a steamer service to Littlehampton connected with trains to London. In 1866 the Isle of Wight Railway reached Ventnor, and in 1870 the iron Royal Victoria Pier was authorised by the Ventnor Pier and Esplanade Order 1870 and constructed. Subsequent storm damage delayed the full establishment of steamer services until 1888 when they were carrying 10,000 passengers from Bournemouth, Southsea, Sandown and Shanklin.

The railway ran a non-stop train from Ryde to Ventnor, named 'The Invalid Express' for the consumptive patients; one train famously completed the journey in a little over twenty minutes. Ventnor became known as 'Mayfair by the sea' for the number of wealthy Londoners who were visiting. In 1887, Bartholomew's Gazetteer described Ventnor as "one of the most popular of English health resorts", with the parish then having a population of 5,739.

By the early 20th century, Ventnor was a flourishing resort town, with several newspapers, a scientific institute, an extensive library, assembly room, pavilion, various sporting clubs, several churches, an annual regatta and carnival, and a new municipal park. In 1901 its population exceeded 6,000.

The physical fabric of the town was not affected by the First World War, although local businesses suffered from the suspension of the summer and winter resort trade, and its war memorial commemorates the local men who died in the fighting. Ventnor and St Lawrence became receiving centres for wounded soldiers. The summer holiday visitors returned in the 1920s, although the winter health trade never resumed. The town reached its zenith in the 1930s when steam packets operated between Southsea and the town's pier. The Art Deco Winter Gardens opened in 1936/7. The relatively small sandy beach was ideal for bathing, and Victorian era hotels in the town's suburbs and near the sea, such as the Ventnor Towers Hotel, remained popular with tourists.

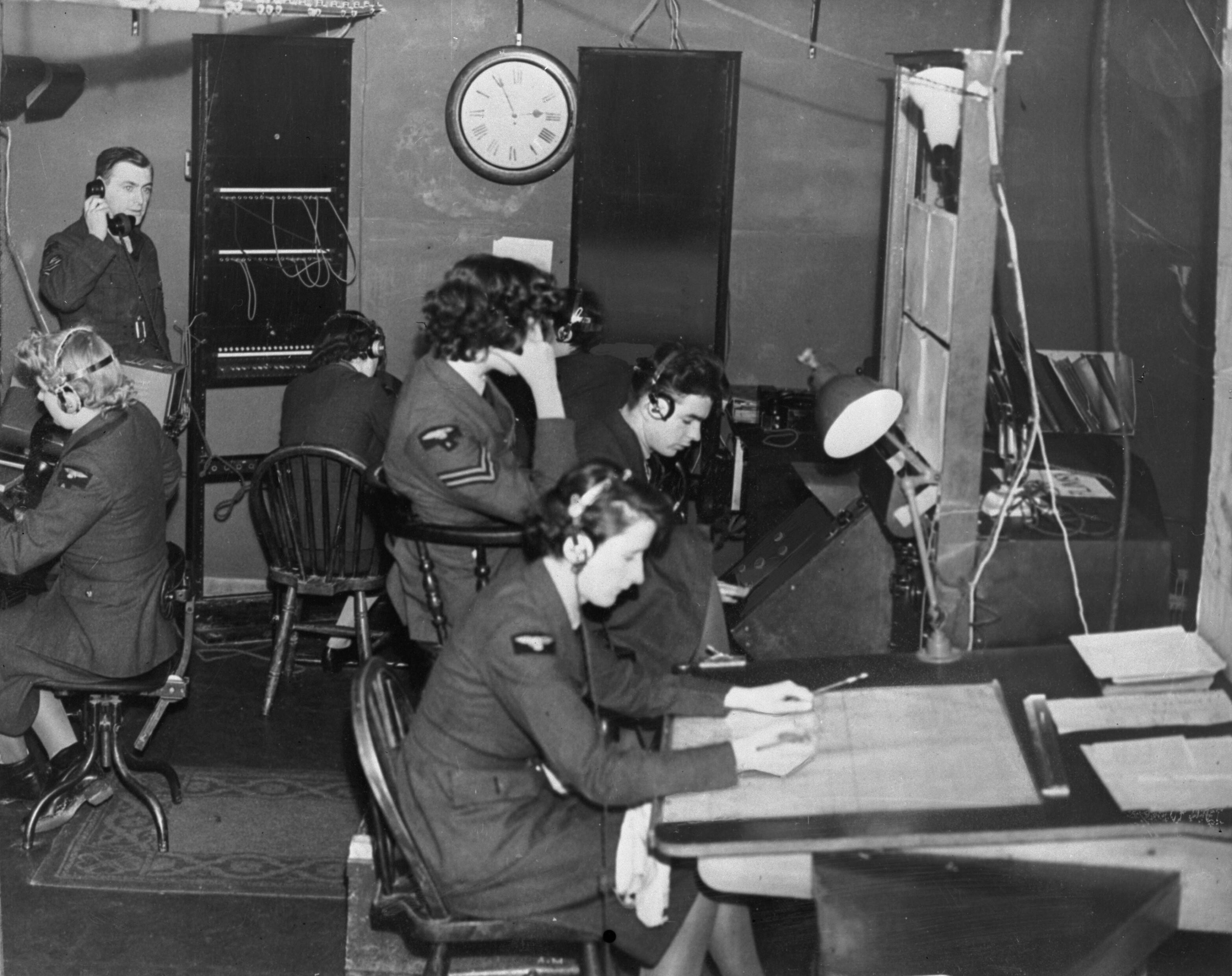
Airmen and WAAF operators at RAF Ventnor during the Battle of Britain

During World War II, the Isle of Wight became a heavily defended restricted area. The radar station at RAF Ventnor was attacked several times during 1940, and the town itself was also bombed, and again in 1942. By the end of the war 120 buildings in the town had been destroyed and nearly 1,500 damaged, with sixteen fatalities. The holiday trade disappeared and was slow to return during post-war austerity. Nevertheless, by the early 1950s the number of tourists warranted 46 trains scheduled to run between Ventnor and Ryde every summer Saturday.

By the 1960s, the British seaside holiday was facing competition from cheap foreign package tours and the rising popularity of motoring. The railway line to Ventnor West closed in 1952 and to Ventnor station in 1966. The pier, damaged by fire and the elements, had fallen into disuse and was finally dismantled in the 1990s. By the 1980s, according to author Michael Freeman: "The town entered the twilight era that characterised so many English seaside places...[with] crumbling public facilities, boarded up shops, faded lodging houses and hotels, not to mention unemployment". During more recent years, there have been some signs of a renaissance, as its strongly Victorian character came back into fashion, with development of the Haven, re-opening of the Winter Gardens, some new shops and restaurants, a lively cultural scene, and the growth in short break travel.

== Governance ==
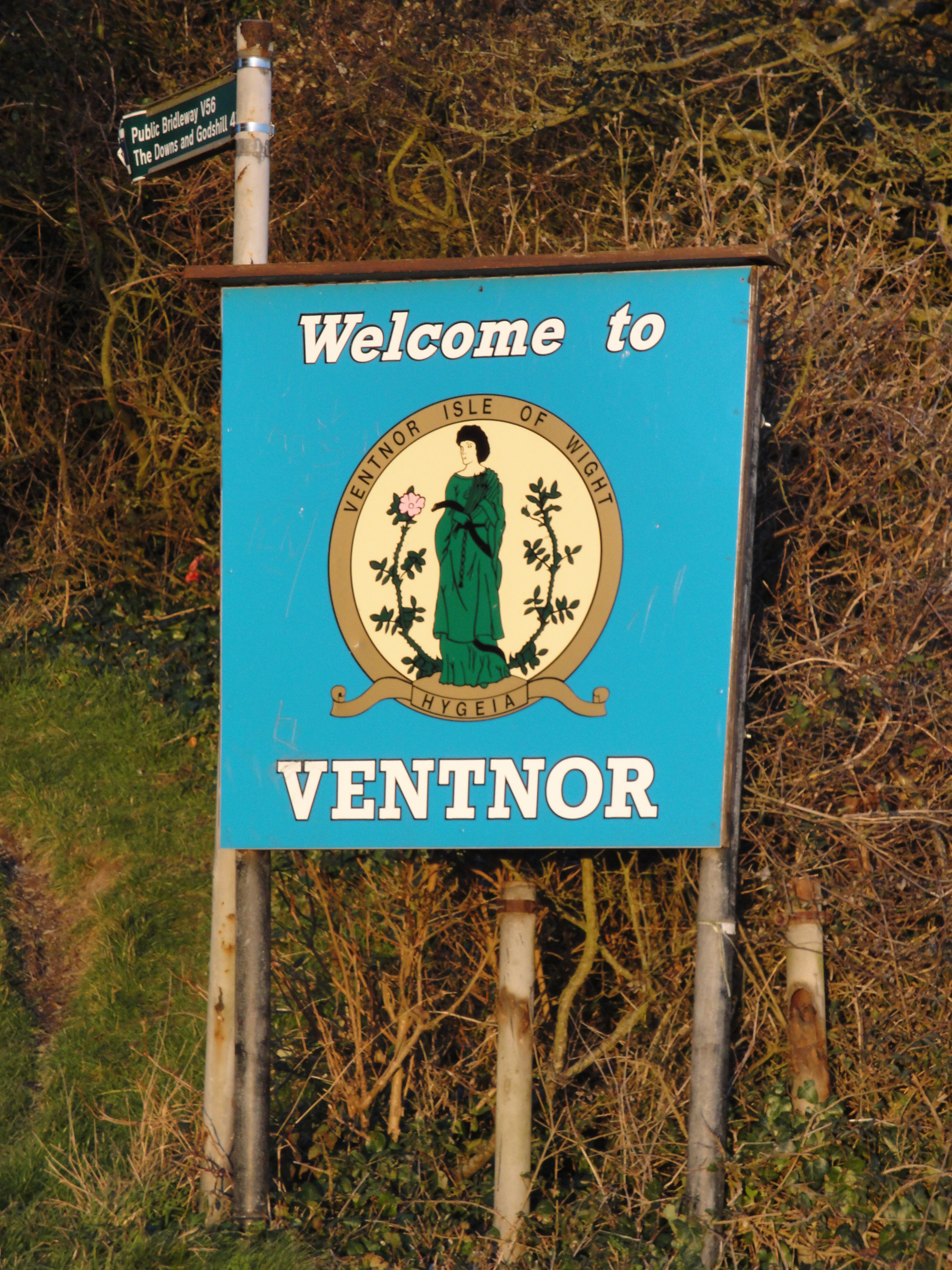
The Ventnor sign on Whitwell Road, 2009

Ventnor is within the Isle of Wight East parliamentary constituency, with local services provided by the unitary Isle of Wight Council. Ventnor comprises part of two of the council's thirty nine wards, with Wroxall, Lowtherville and Bonchurch taking in the very eastern side of the town, as well as Bonchurch and Upper Ventnor, and Ventnor and St Lawrence covering the town centre and western part of the town, including the Esplanade, as well as St Lawrence. Prior to 1974, the town had its own Urban District Council (formed in 1894), merged into South Wight District Council during that year, as a second tier beneath the Isle of Wight County Council. The district council was abolished in 1995 when the unitary authority for the island was created. Since 1994, a conservation area has covered much of the central area of the town.

Ventnor has a town council that manages various local services, including the park, four car parks, public toilets, and allotments. The Council is responsible for local byelaws, and is consulted by the Isle of Wight Council on matters such as planning and transport. The Town Council has eleven councillors covering four wards, with Ventnor West having six of the councillors, plus separate wards for Bonchurch & Ventnor East, Lowtherville, and St Lawrence. Its coat of arms, displayed on welcome signs by roads into the town, shows Hygeia, the ancient Greek goddess of health, adopted in 1890 to reference its importance as a health resort, surrounded by wild roses referencing the garden isle.

The 'Our Place' project in 2014, led by the Town Council working with residents and local public and private sector providers, identified the priorities for the town as being improved health and wellbeing, a renewed and refreshed economy, and enhanced community capacity. The Council's Strategy Plan, developed in 2016 against the background of reduced funding from Isle of Wight Council for local services and the transfer of new responsibilities to the Town Council, focuses on the need for community inclusiveness, co-operation, influence and sustainability, in order to build the capacity to respond effectively to economic and social challenges.

== Geography ==
Ventnor is on the south-east coast of the Isle of Wight, an island in the English Channel about two miles (3.2 km) off the coast of Hampshire, at 50°36′N 1°13′W. It is 11 miles (18 km) by road south-south-east of the island's county town Newport, and about 100 miles (160 km) south-west of London. Its coastline is dominated by cliff scenery, with the town rising up the steep south-facing terraces between Ventnor Bay and St Boniface Down, which, at 241 metres (791 ft), is the highest point on the island. The town itself extends from the seashore up to the slopes of the downs, with its commercial centre being 45 metres (148 ft) above sea-level; the urban area is contiguous with the neighbouring settlements of St Lawrence to the west and Bonchurch to the east.

"Ventnor hangs upon the side of a steep hill, and here and there it clings and scrambles, is propped up and terraced, like one of the bright-faced towns that look down upon the Mediterranean"

— Henry James

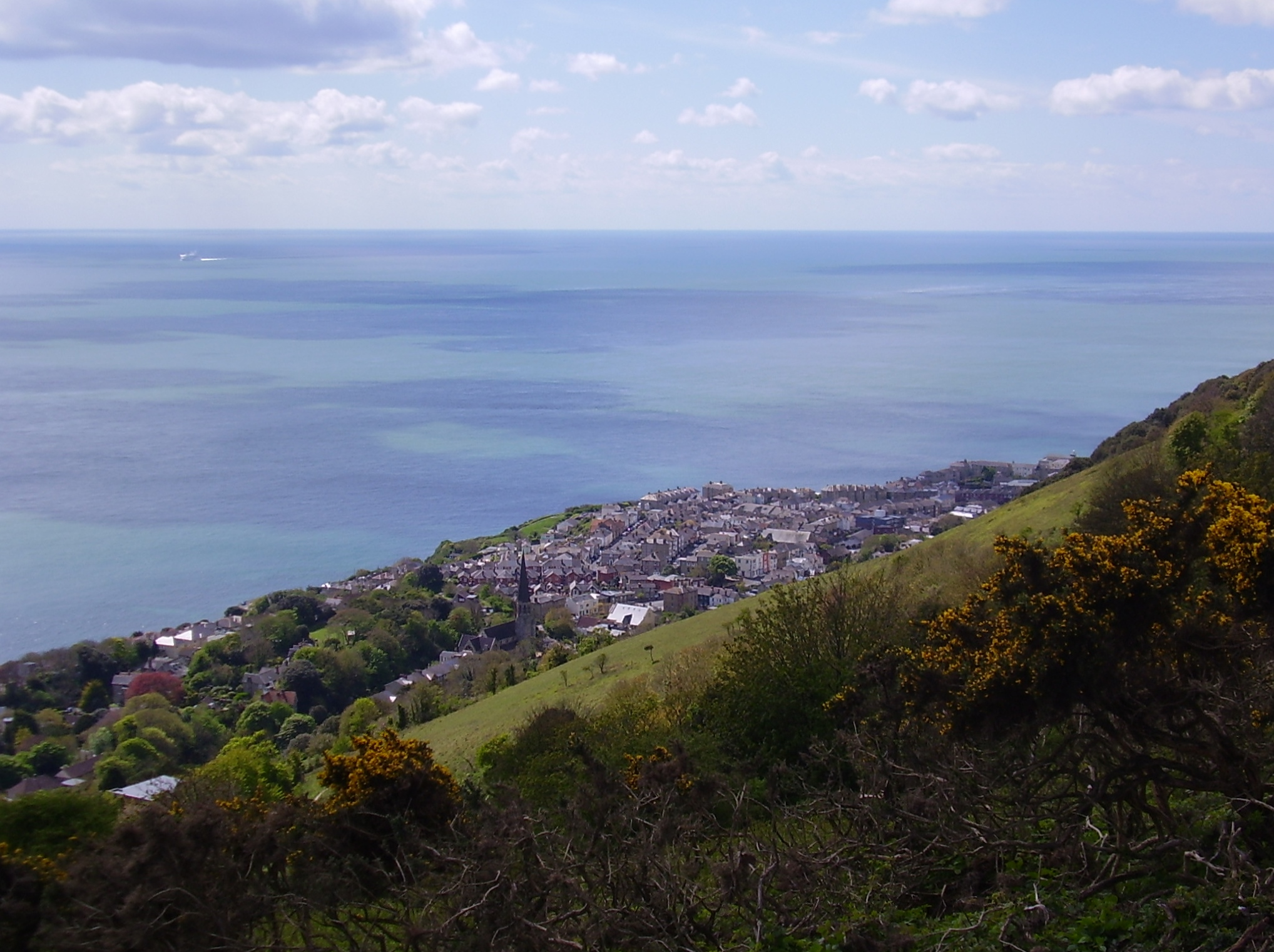
Ventnor seen from the downs, 2017

There are nearby Sites of Special Scientific Interest at Ventnor Downs, St Lawrence Bank, Rew Down, and the Bonchurch Landslips, as well as the coast west of the town that forms part of the island's largest SSSI between Steephill Cove and Compton Chine. The downs are part of the Isle of Wight Area of Outstanding Natural Beauty. Ventnor beach is one of the island's principal if smaller beaches; there are also small beaches at Bonchurch and Steephill. The Isle of Wight Coastal Path runs through Ventnor. The town has no river, although there are tufa-depositing springs along the downs feeding streams that flow the short distance to the sea, such as one through Cascade Gardens, and another through the park that becomes Flowers Brook.

The tides along the coast are strong, with a tidal range of around 3 metres (10 ft). Three miles off the coast, there is a parallel ridge under the sea rising to within 15 metres (49 ft) of the surface; tidal flows forced between it, and the island have carved out a deep channel known as 'St Catherine's Deep'. Offshore there are 71 recorded sites of shipwrecks, and three air wrecks classified as Military Remains Protected Places. The notable Clarendon wreck occurred just along the coast near Blackgang Chine in 1836, which prompted the building of St Catherine's lighthouse.

The local coastline needs active shoreline management, with one of the longest stretches of naturally-developing soft cliffs along the British coast. Many are now protected by rock armour, large grey boulders imported from Somerset, or east of Ventnor by concrete tetrapods, all part of a £1.6 million programme of sea defence work completed in the 1990s. The coast here is also part of the South Wight Maritime Special Area of Conservation, with subtidal reefs that provide important habitats for marine species.

Ventnor is the seventh largest town on the Isle of Wight, with a population of just under 6,000. The nearest town is Shanklin, nearly four miles to the north-east, and the nearest villages are Whitwell and Wroxall, both less than 3 miles (4.8 km) distant.

== Geology ==
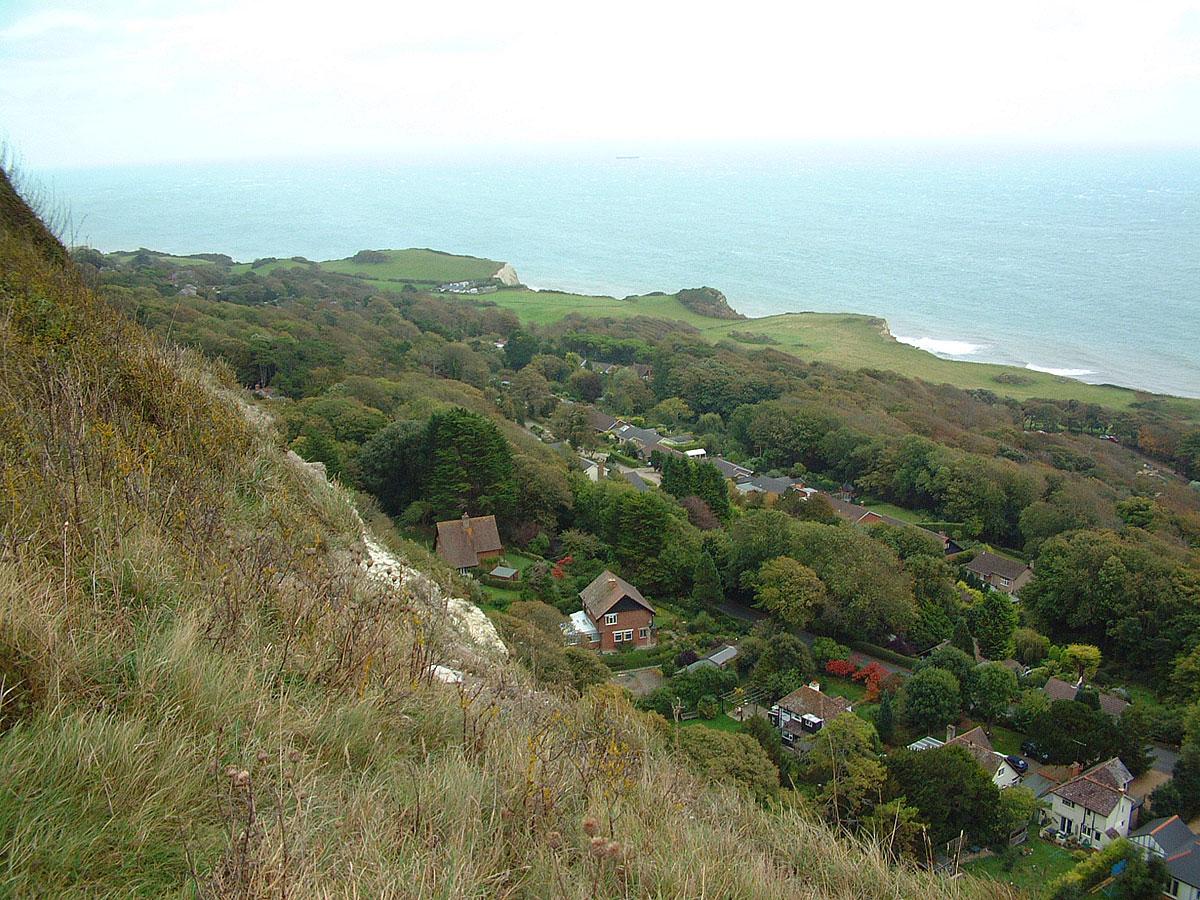
The Undercliff at St Lawrence

The local geomorphology defines the town. The Isle of Wight has complex geology of folded layers of sedimentary rocks (Greensand, chalk, and Gault clay), with Ventnor itself situated on the Undercliff, which is the largest urban landslide complex in North West Europe. According to the council's Shoreline Management Plan, the "medium to high sandstone, clay or chalk debris cliffs...are important for their geomorphological, ecological and entomological interest".

A significant area is built on the Gault clay, known locally as 'blue slipper', which when saturated allows the rocks above to suffer from landslip. The ground is notoriously unstable, and there are indications that the area is becoming less stable as the support provided by the lower slopes is slowly eroded.

The Shoreline Management Plan aims to protect the shoreline from erosion that would otherwise reactivate relic landslides along the Undercliff. The council believes that cliff protection works at Wheelers and Monks Bays "appear to have significantly reduced the occurrences of landslide re-activations". Nevertheless, the periodic movement has destroyed buildings over the years, led to cracking of local roads, and disrupted utilities. In 2011 a vent opened at the former bus stop in Ocean View Road. A nearby Site of Special Scientific Interest is known as the Landslip. In 2014, after storms and heavy rain, a landslip caused the road between Ventnor and Niton to collapse.

The local area is an important one for fossils; the Compton Chine to Steephill Cove SSSI is a nationally important site with notable invertebrate assemblages.

== Climate ==
Ventnor and the Isle of Wight have a maritime climate with cool summers and mild winters. The Met Office maintains a weather station at Ventnor Park. Because of its coastal location, Ventnor currently holds the British record for the warmest night for the month of June: 22.7 °C (72.9 °F) in 1976.

According to the Tourist Board, the Isle of Wight is one of the sunniest places in the UK. Ventnor competes with Eastbourne to be considered the sunniest, both with about 1888 hours of sunshine per year, and averaging five hours of sun a day, peaking at eight hours during the summer. The town is sheltered from north winds behind St Boniface Down, and consequently has its own microclimate. This enables the Botanic Garden to grow species that would not survive outside elsewhere in the UK.

Climate data for Ventnor Park 60m asl, 1971-2000
Month	Jan	Feb	Mar	Apr	May	Jun	Jul	Aug	Sep	Oct	Nov	Dec	Year
Mean daily maximum °C (°F)	7.9 (46.2)	7.8 (46.0)	9.8 (49.6)	12.0 (53.6)	15.2 (59.4)	17.5 (63.5)	19.7 (67.5)	20.1 (68.2)	18.1 (64.6)	14.9 (58.8)	11.2 (52.2)	9.0 (48.2)	13.6 (56.5)
Mean daily minimum °C (°F)	3.6 (38.5)	3.2 (37.8)	4.4 (39.9)	5.6 (42.1)	8.7 (47.7)	11.3 (52.3)	13.6 (56.5)	14.1 (57.4)	12.4 (54.3)	9.9 (49.8)	6.5 (43.7)	4.7 (40.5)	8.2 (46.7)
Source: YR.NO

Climate data for St Catherine's Point 16m asl, 1981-2010
Month	Jan	Feb	Mar	Apr	May	Jun	Jul	Aug	Sep	Oct	Nov	Dec	Year
Mean daily maximum °C (°F)	8.2 (46.8)	7.8 (46.0)	9.4 (48.9)	11.6 (52.9)	14.6 (58.3)	17.1 (62.8)	19.2 (66.6)	19.8 (67.6)	18.2 (64.8)	15.1 (59.2)	11.7 (53.1)	9.1 (48.4)	13.5 (56.3)
Mean daily minimum °C (°F)	4.2 (39.6)	3.6 (38.5)	4.9 (40.8)	6.3 (43.3)	9.3 (48.7)	11.9 (53.4)	14.2 (57.6)	14.7 (58.5)	13.2 (55.8)	10.7 (51.3)	7.5 (45.5)	4.9 (40.8)	8.8 (47.8)
Average rainfall mm (inches)	72.0 (2.83)	53.4 (2.10)	54.4 (2.14)	46.2 (1.82)	46.2 (1.82)	39.0 (1.54)	37.5 (1.48)	42.9 (1.69)	57.6 (2.27)	90.6 (3.57)	78.7 (3.10)	81.6 (3.21)	700.2 (27.57)
Average rainy days (≥ 1.0 mm)	12.3	9.2	10.0	8.5	7.9	6.6	6.6	6.8	8.2	12.0	12.3	12.5	112.8
Source: UK Met Office

== Wildlife ==
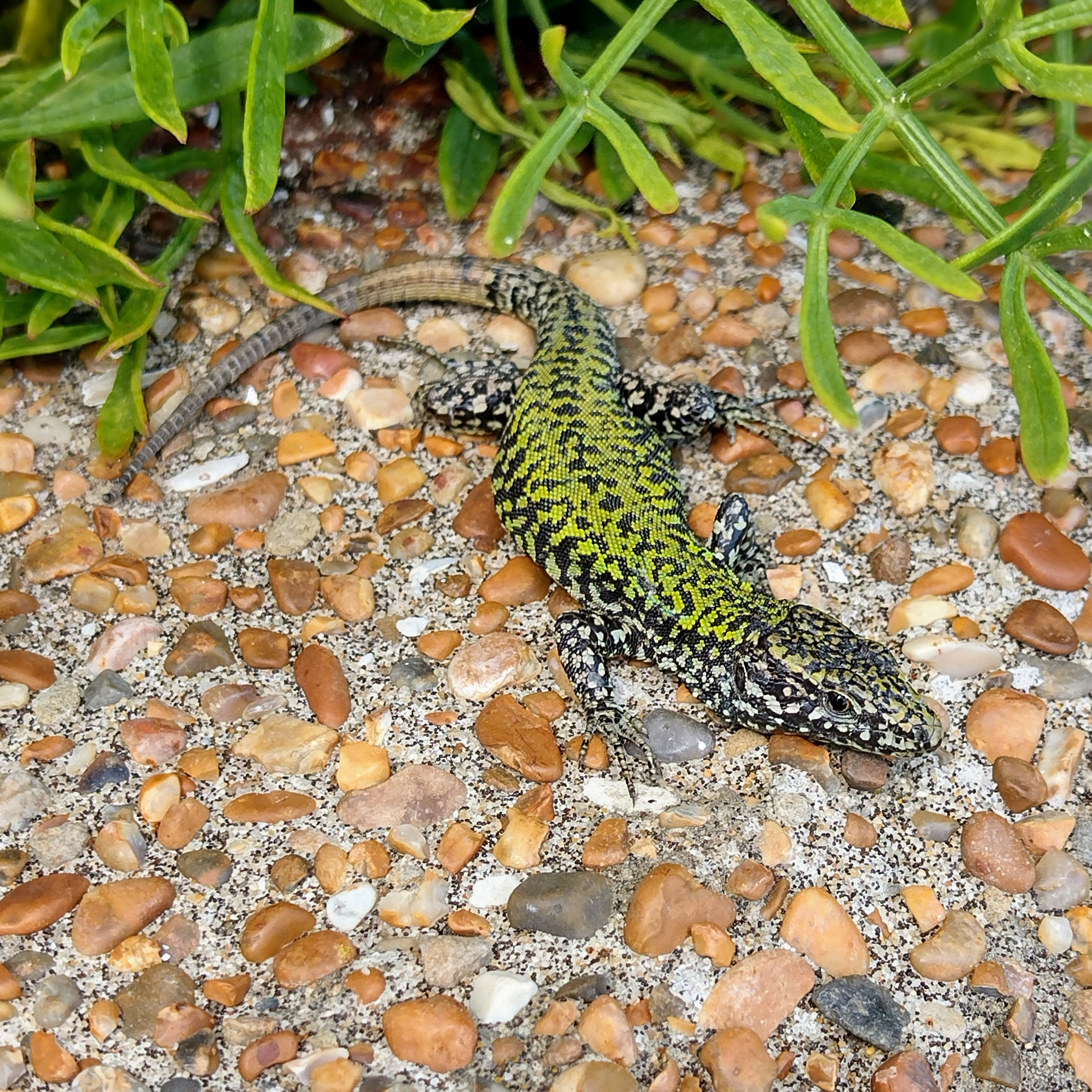
Male wall lizard in Ventnor

The climate and habitats in Ventnor support species that are rare in the UK, including some that are particularly associated with warmer and more southerly locations and are not established in much of the rest of the country. The town has the largest and oldest British colony of common wall lizards; whether these are a relict native population or were released in the 1920s is debated. A wall specially designed as a habitat has been built at the Botanic Garden, and small tunnels for the lizards installed beneath a local road.

The Isle of Wight is one of the principal British refuges of the once ubiquitous UK red squirrel population. They are relatively shy and most likely seen in wooded areas away from the town.

Ventnor downs support a small herd of feral goats, introduced in 1993 to control the growth of holm oak trees, and managed by the National Trust. Although not native to the UK, holm oak was introduced from the Mediterranean; the Victorians planted it widely in Ventnor, which has the largest holm oak wood in Northern Europe. This is described in the Isle of Wight Biodiversity Action Plan as a "remarkable and extensive area of recent secondary woodland", and is gradually becoming colonised by other Mediterranean species including large white helleborine, yellow birds nest, the large fungus Amanita ovoidea, and the oak rustic moth. The holm oak stabilises the land, but is invasive, its further spread limited by the goats.

The only significant remaining UK population of Glanville fritillary butterfly, one of Britain's rarest, is found along the southern coast of the Isle of Wight including Ventnor. According to the National Trust, the "downland above the town is immensely rich and important for butterflies... of top national importance". The coastal downs west of Ventnor are also one of few locations in the UK where Field Cow-wheat can be found.

Early gentian can be found on Rew Down, just north-west of the town. It is a rare species in the UK first recorded in 1883 at this site and recognised as internationally important by EU Habitats Directives. This down is also noted for pyramidal orchids and the once-endangered adonis blue butterfly.

Ventnor's subtidal reefs provide important habitats for marine species, for some of which the Isle of Wight is the eastern limit of distribution, representing the transition zone between the Gulf Stream from the south-west and cooler North Sea waters. These include the rare seaweed Gracilaria bursa-pastoris (or shepherd’s purse seaweed). The local coastline attracts bottlenose dolphin, basking shark and other cetaceans, as well as being an important area for fish species, including rays.

=== Ventnor Botanic Garden ===
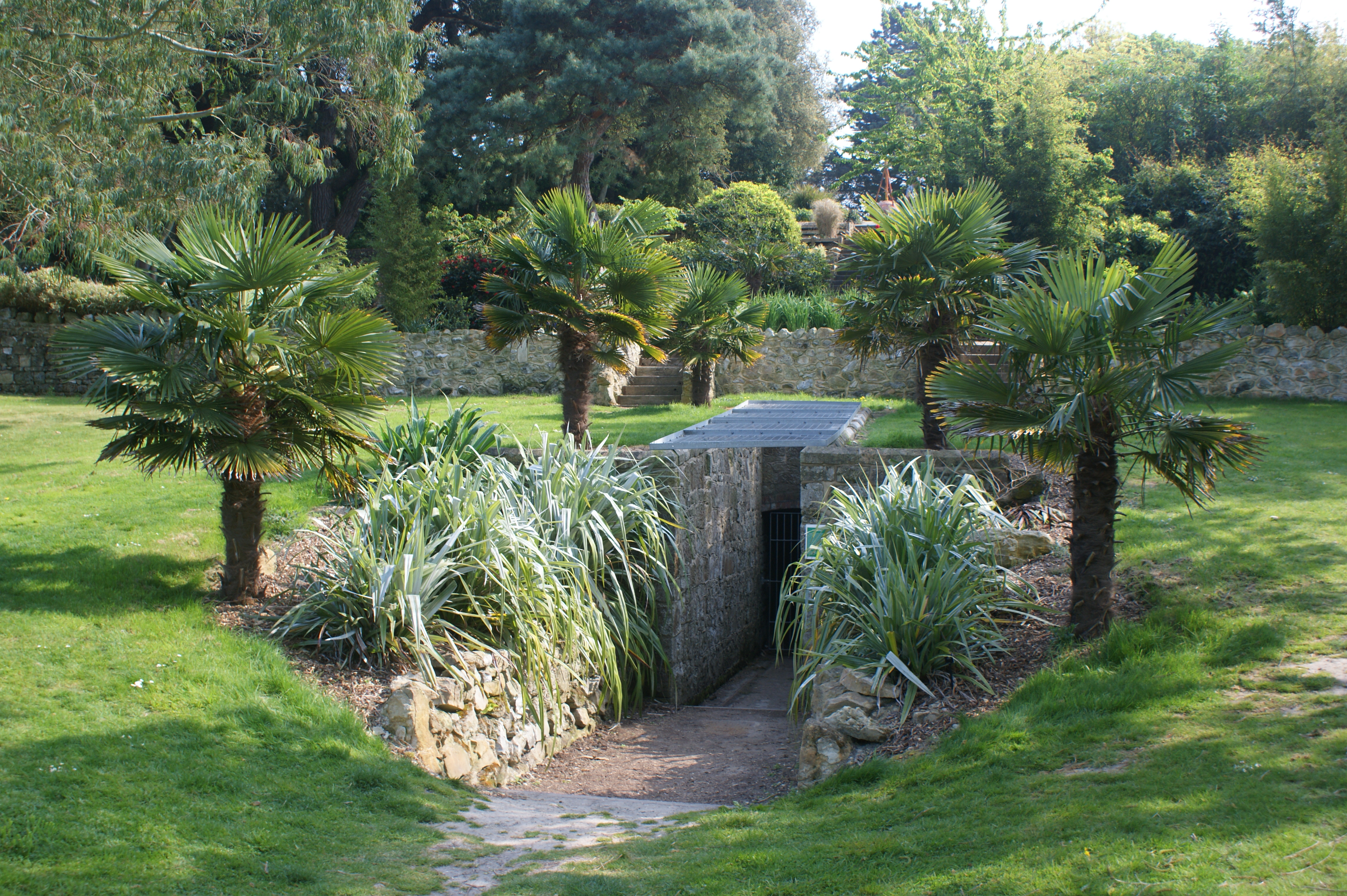
Ventnor Botanic Garden, 2011

Ventnor Botanic Garden was founded in 1970 by Sir Harold Hillier and occupies the 22-acre site of the former Royal National Hospital for Chest Diseases. The warm and sunny microclimate allows plants that are usually too tender for mainland Britain to grow. Its collection comprises worldwide temperate and subtropical trees and shrubs, organised by region, notably from Australia and New Zealand but also from Japan and the Mediterranean. Plants nevertheless have to be selected to tolerate the shallow alkaline soil and salt winds. Echium pininana is a tall species of flowering plant in the borage family Boraginaceae, native to La Palma in the Canary Islands, but grown in the Botanic Garden and in local gardens.

The Garden has a temperate house, and a visitor centre renovated in 2001. The Garden claims to be Britain's hottest garden and to have developed the 'Ventnor Method', presenting plants in association with each other as they are seen in the wild. Its species of puya plants from the Andes are part of the National Plant Collection, and almost unique in Britain for being grown outdoors. Its Palm Court was planted in the late 19th century, and some of the current trees may be the originals.

== Demography ==
Having passed 6,000 by the turn of the 20th century, Ventnor's population peaked at over 7,300 in the early 1950s. According to UK census data, the population of Ventnor parish was 6,257 in 2001 and 5,976 in 2011, with a 2016 ONS estimate of 5,837, indicating a trend of declining population of just under 0.5% per year. With an area of 0.980 square miles (2.54 km^{2}), the population density in 2016 was 5,730 inhabitants per square mile (2,211/km^{2}). 51.7% of the population is female, with 16% aged 0–17 years, 53% aged 18–64, and 31% aged 65 or over. Mosaic analysis of the 2011 census classified 27% of Ventnor East and 39% of Ventnor West households as "active elderly people living in pleasant retirement locations", with 46% of East and 20% of West as "residents of small and mid-sized towns with strong local roots".

=== Population ===
Year	Ventnor East	West	Total	%change
2002	3107	3132	6239	
2003	3116	3131	6247	+0.1
2004	3116	3165	6281	+0.5
2005	3103	3132	6235	-0.7
2006	3138	3108	6246	+0.2
2007	3100	3132	6232	-0.2
2008	3110	3100	6210	-0.4
2009	3083	3097	6180	-0.5
2010	3071	3044	6115	-1.1
2011	3052	2924	5976	-2.3
2012	3045	2913	5958	-0.3
2013	2962	2902	5864	-1.6
2014	2947	2913	5860	-0.1
2015	2975	2902	5877	+0.3
2016	2975	2862	5837	-0.7

In March 2011, Ventnor parish had 2,846 occupied households, each containing an average of 2.1 people, 66% being houses (detached 29%, semi-detached 22%, terraced 15%) and 34% flats (18% purpose built, 14% conversions, 2% in commercial buildings). However, there were a further 733 household spaces (about 20% of the total) with no residents on the 2011 census day. Of the households, 43% owned their home outright, 23% owned with a mortgage or loan, 20% were private rented, and 12% social rented. 26% had no car in the household.

Of residents aged at least 16 in 2011, 47% were married, 27.5% single and never married, 13.1% divorced, 9.7% widowed, 2.5% separated, and 0.2% in a same-sex civil partnerships. 57.7% were living as a couple, and 42.3% were not. 94.3% had been born in the UK (91.5% in England, 1.4% in Scotland, 1.2% in Wales and 0.2% in Northern Ireland), with 0.6% born in Ireland, 2.1% in the rest of the EU, and 3.0% elsewhere. 24.3% had no passport.

=== Age ===
In 2011 the average age of Ventnor residents was 47.3 years, compared with averages of 44 years for the island and 39 for England. The age distribution was as follows:

2011	Ventnor East	West	Total
0–9	229	215	444
10–19	353	326	679
20–29	281	194	475
30–39	284	197	481
40-49	450	361	811
50-59	444	441	885
60-69	505	583	1088
70-79	284	350	634
80+	222	257	479

=== Ethnicity ===
2011	Number	Percentage
White: British	5624	94.1
White: Non-British	182	3.1
Mixed race	109	1.8
Asian or Asian British	51	0.9
Black or Black British	6	0.1
Chinese or other	4	0.1

== Economy ==
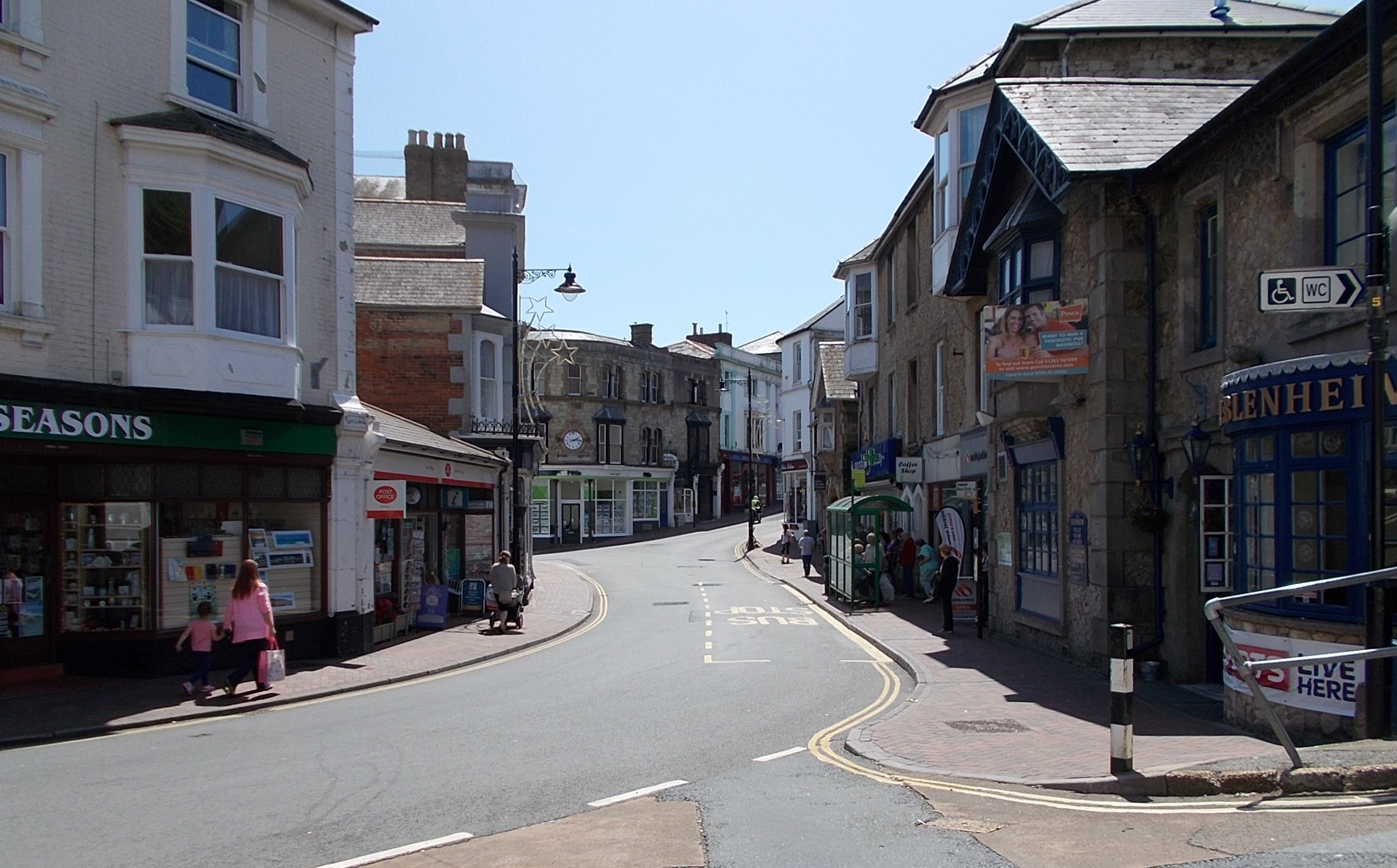
Ventnor High Street, 2017

The English Indices of Deprivation 2010 identified the central area of Ventnor as being one of the 20% most deprived areas, with the economy dependent on low paid seasonal work from tourism, and challenges from child poverty, inadequate housing, and relatively high levels of disability and ill health. The 2015 Indices suggest that this relative position has worsened, with Lowtherville closer to falling into the 20%. In the sub-domains, central Ventnor scored particularly badly for employment, and Lowtherville for children in poverty. 9% of households in Ventnor East are without central heating, compared to an English average of 2.7%. An analysis published in 2014 suggests that the average annual income in Ventnor, at £27,978, is the lowest of any sub-area on the island.

Of the population aged 16–74, on census day 2011 24% were working full-time, 14% part-time, 16% self-employed, 5% unemployed, 5% studying, 4% looking after home or family, 6% long-term sick or disabled, and 24% retired. The most common occupational categories were health and social (15%), wholesale and retail (14%), accommodation and food servicing (14%), and education (11%). However, of those in employment, 64% worked full-time and 36% part-time.

The town has many hotels and cafés, open seasonally to support the tourist trade. The main retail centres are the town centre (principally the High Street and Pier Street) and the Esplanade. There is an industrial estate on the site of the former station in Upper Ventnor, and a local shellfish industry near the Haven. Ventnor also has a small shipbuilding company.

Regarding its retail sector, an IOW Council Retail Assessment (based on a 2009 health check) concluded: "Although the town has a good mix of local and tourist focussed retail and leisure provision, the high level of vacant units and charity shops gives the impression of a poor quality of retail provision. It suffers from a relative lack of public transport accessibility." It recommended that "planning policies focus on protecting...local convenience and specialist comparison goods, such as antiques and vintage items".

== Arts and culture ==
Ventnor has an active arts scene, featuring several annual arts events, venues for theatre and independent film, and active arts clubs.

Ventnor Fringe Festival has been held annually since 2010. This is an open arts festival taking place in venues across the town, similar to the Edinburgh Festival Fringe on a smaller scale. Previous acts include Liam Bailey and Johnny Flynn as well as theatre companies such as Paines Plough. The Fringe coincides with the Ventnor Carnival and, since 2012, the Isle of Wight Film Festival.

Ventnor Carnival is a traditional town carnival, held in the middle of August, with carnival floats, marching bands and drinking. The carnival started in 1889 and claims to be the second oldest carnival in the UK. From 2016 there has been an annual Ventnor Day to celebrate the town, since 2017 organised on the same day as the Round the Island Race, with music, entertainment and stalls promoting local community groups.

Between 2005 and 2008, Ventnor hosted the Isle of Wight International Jazz Festival, with headline acts including Maceo Parker, Humphrey Lyttelton and Cleo Laine. Between 2011 and 2016, Isle of Arts was an annual festival held in the town, with acts including Rich Hall, Sandi Toksvig, Alan Davies and Phill Jupitus. Isle of Arts ended after 2016, because of the costs of the event. However the range of the Ventnor Fringe has since been expanded, and now runs concurrently with the Ventnor International Festival, with acts visiting from around the world.

Ventnor does not have a mainstream cinema, but there is a local film club that arranges showings of international films. There have also been outdoor film screenings during the summer Fringe. Ventnor Arts Club occupies a former bank in the town centre, and arranges live broadcasts of opera, ballet and theatre performances as well as music events.

Each July, Isle of Wight Arts holds a free open studios event across the island, with a wide range of local artists and craftspeople opening their homes and studios to the public.

Peer Studios in Pier Street, Ventnor is a Community Interest Company running an arts gallery and studio devoted to the nurture and support of local artists.

== Landmarks ==
Ventnor's landmarks arise from its natural environment, its Victorian heritage, and its tourist appeal past and present. Although modest in altitude at 241 metres (791 ft), the chalk St Boniface Down is 1/2 mile (0.80 km) north of the town. The downs have a thick layer of acid flint gravels, with dry heathland vegetation. The town's small beach of reddish chert sand and pebbles of flint and chert, with Ventnor Haven to the east and the prominent Spyglass Inn at its western end, will be familiar to many visitors. It is backed by an esplanade, which was created in 1848, now fronted by pubs, cafes, shops and restaurants. The gnomon on the esplanade was presented to the town by Sir Thomas Brisbane in 1851. At its eastern end is Ventnor's pumping station, a £14 million project completed in 2002 as part of 'Shifting Sands', a joint initiative between English Heritage and the Commission for Architecture and the Built Environment. It is disguised as a bandstand and viewing platform.

Just west of the beach is the Ventnor sign on the cliffs at La Falaise, with the town's name in 13-foot-tall (4.0 m) white concrete blocks. It was erected between the wars and intended to provide a landmark visible from the sea, replacing the chalk letters that were damaged in 1992. Just along the coastal path is Flowers Brook, a stream flowing through a small coastal meadow and recreation ground. In 2015 the meadow was earmarked for the coastal substation of a tidal energy generation scheme, but the scheme was suspended in 2017. A short distance further west is Steephill Cove, a hamlet and small beach that is inaccessible to motor vehicles, which has cafes and self-catering cottages.

Ventnor Park, April 2018

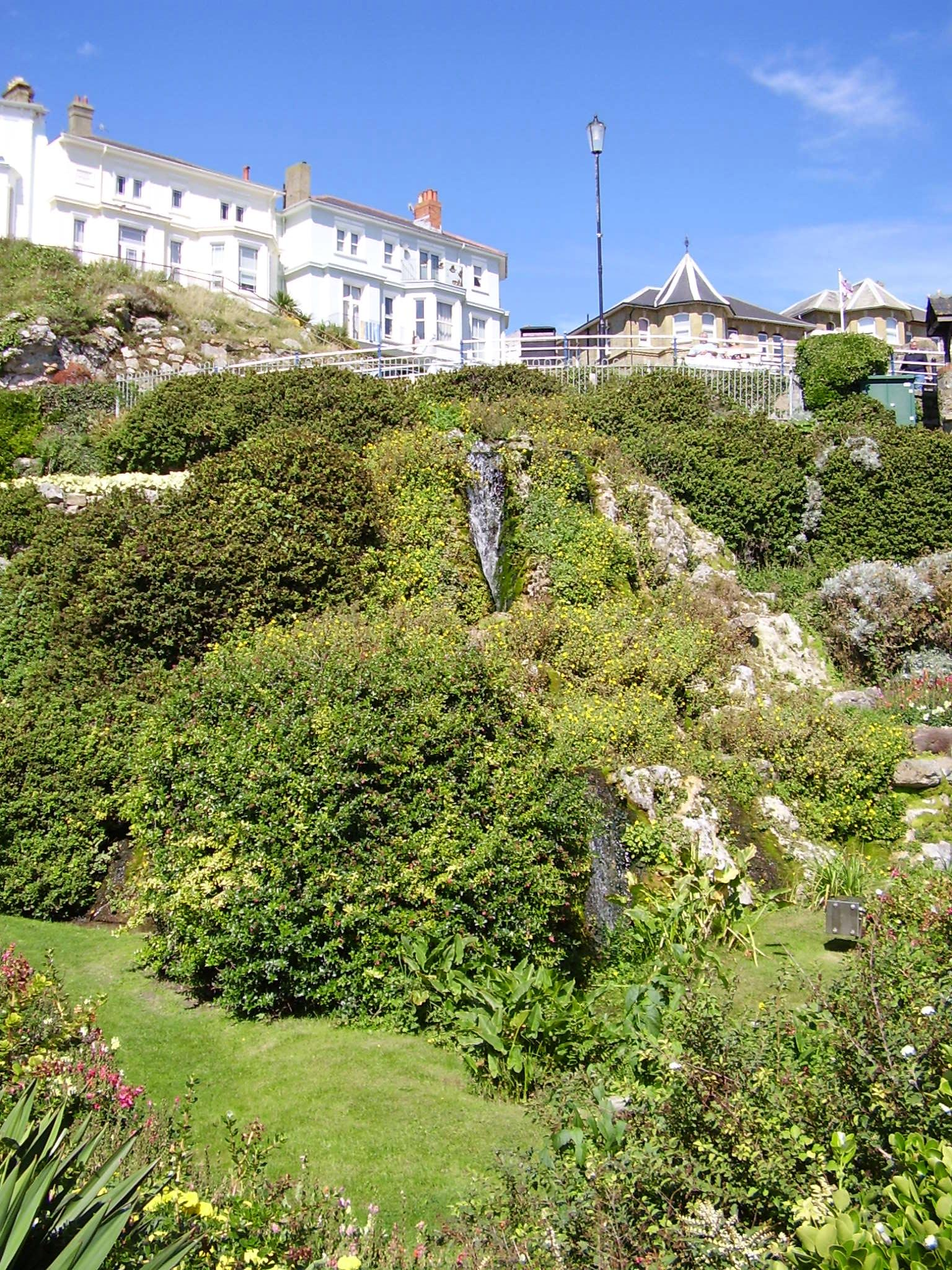
Ventnor Cascade, August 2006

Ventnor Park, on the western side of town, was awarded 'Park of the Year' at the 2016 South and South East England in Bloom Awards. It has a bandstand, small aviary and stream, a putting green open seasonally, outdoor gym, and live music on Sunday afternoons during the summer. The land was originally owned by the Hambrough family, and leased to the town in the 1880s. Other public open spaces include Cascade Gardens, with its former mill stream and small waterfall, which were laid out in 1903. Below is a paddling-pool on the esplanade with a model of the Isle of Wight that children can play on.

RAF Ventnor is a former radar monitoring station atop St Boniface Down, and is now used for civilian and air traffic communications antennae. It also contains bunkers that were part of an early warning network, later converted into nuclear shelters during the Cold War as part of the ROTOR programme, now sealed and inaccessible. There is a memorial plaque nearby at the site of the 1962 Channel Airways Dakota accident, after which new regulations were introduced to improve air passenger safety.

Ventnor Exchange is an arts centre that opened in 2014 in the old Post Office building on Church Street. It organises the annual Ventnor Fringe Festival, supports emerging artists, and runs creative workshops for young actors, artists and writers. The winter gardens is an Art Deco building, dating from 1936, which was designed as a result of a competition in 1935 and built on the site of the vicarage. It was closed in 2011, then refurbished and re-opened as a cafe/restaurant and entertainment venue in 2014.

Along the coast, other notable landmarks include Blackgang Chine, the UK's oldest theme park, which opened in 1843. Its first attraction, still on display, was the skeleton of a whale washed up on an island beach the following year, The powerful lighthouse of St Catherine's is five miles away, at the southernmost tip of the island.

Ventnor Town Hall survives but was converted into flats in 1994.

== Transport ==
Surrounded by hills, with no railway connection, no roads within the County's Strategic Road Network, and only two year-round bus routes connecting to other towns, Ventnor is relatively isolated from the rest of the island.

=== Access by road ===
Historically Ventnor was difficult to reach by road, along narrow and steep tracks. In the mid-nineteenth century the three routes were, from the east, through Bonchurch via the steep White (now Bonchurch) Shute, from the north, via Old Shute described by Michael Freeman as "a precipitous descent", and from the west by a steep shute connecting Whitwell with St Lawrence. The modern routes respectively via the Leeson Road, Ocean View Road, and Whitwell Road, as well as the route to Niton along the Undercliff (closed to vehicles since 2014 following a landslip) were all created in the later nineteenth century.

=== History of the railway ===
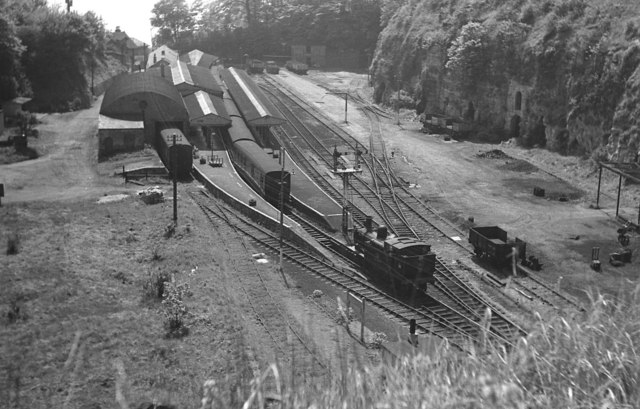
Ventnor station, 1963

Railways reached the town in 1866 from Shanklin and Wroxall, and in 1900 from Merstone and Godshill. Ventnor railway station was the terminus of the Isle of Wight Railway (later the Island Line), and it brought many visitors to the town. Ventnor West railway station was the terminus of the Isle of Wight Central Railway from Cowes through Newport. Both stations suffered from being away from the town centre, requiring an onward road journey for travellers.

Ventnor West station was closed in 1952, before the closures ordered by Dr Beeching. Ventnor Station was closed in 1966, as part of a plan that also saw the remaining Ryde-Shanklin line electrified. Thereafter the town suffered economic decline from which it has not fully recovered. More recently the local MP has asked about the feasibility of extending the Island Line to Ventnor.

Between 2004 and 2010 a 'rail link' bus by Wightbus ran from St Lawrence and Ventnor to Shanklin, facilitating the journey to and from Ventnor.

=== Bus services ===
Southern Vectis run buses on route 3 and 6 from Ventnor to destinations including Godshill, Newport, Ryde, Sandown, Shanklin and Niton. Night buses run on Fridays and Saturdays.

A summer-only Southern Vectis service is the Island Coaster, which connects Ventnor with the main communities on the eastern and southern coasts and a variety of tourist attractions, including Blackgang Chine, Isle of Wight Pearl, and Alum Bay.

Additionally Island Minibus service run the local number 31 route which connects Ventnor to Bonchurch Village, the Botanic Garden and esplanade. Previously operated by Wightbus, the link to the esplanade was restored in 2011 after many years, despite suggestions that this would be impractical.

=== Pedestrianisation ===
As of 2018, the Town Council is consulting about the possibility of pedestrianising part of the High Street and/or the Esplanade.

== Education ==
Education on the Isle of Wight is provided by local education authority-maintained schools, and independent schools. As a rural community, many of these schools are small, with average numbers of pupils lower than in many urban areas. In 2011 schools in the Isle of Wight were re-organised from a three-tier to a two-tier primary and secondary system, with pupils at state schools changing schools at age eleven. The former Middle Schools were closed.

Ventnor now has one secondary, one primary and one special school:

- The Island Free School (secondary);
- St Francis Catholic and CofE Primary School Academy;
- St Catherine's School, a special school for pupils with speech and language difficulties.

Of the adult population in 2011, 25% had no qualifications, slightly higher than the English average of 22%. 24% had degree-level qualifications, compared to 27% in England.

Ventnor's library was founded as the Ventnor and Bonchurch Literary and Scientific Institution in 1848, moving into its current building in the High Street two years later. It has been part of the county library service since 1940. Nearly a third of residents are active members of the library, which also offers a music collection and open access computers, and a venue for both educational and cultural events.

The town has a small heritage centre and museum, in a local shop purchased by the Local History Society in 1987. The museum's collection and archive documents Ventnor's growth and popularity during Victorian times.

== Religious sites ==
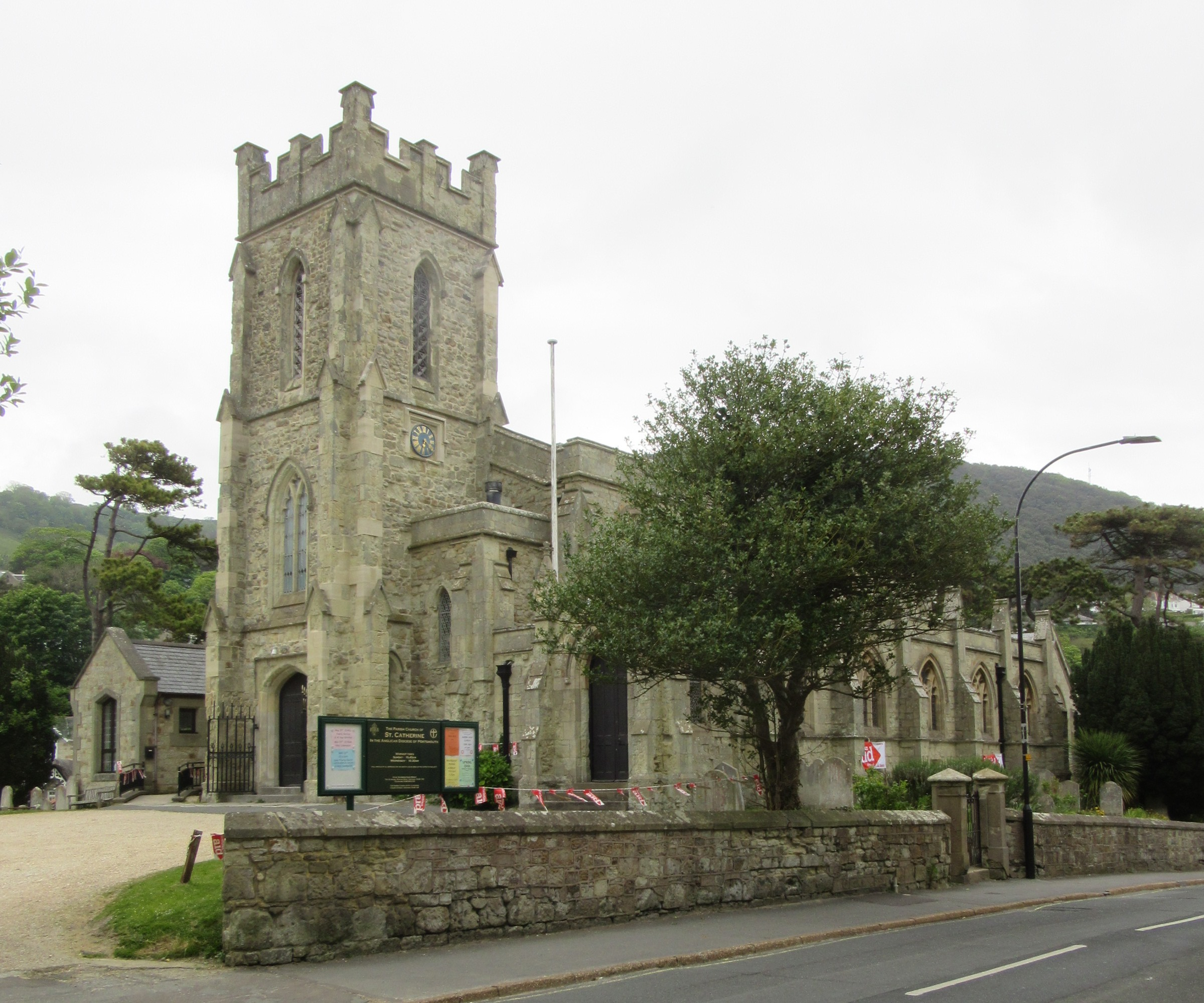
St Catherine's Church, 2016

Ventnor has churches of several Christian denominations. St Catherine's Church is one of two Church of England parish churches, dating from 1837 and financed by John Hamborough. The other is Holy Trinity Church, dating from 1860-2, which is constructed in a Gothic Revival style with a tall spire. The cost of building Holy Trinity was met by three sisters who disliked the evangelical nature of the original parish church. There is also a third Church of England place of worship, St Alban's, which is anglo-catholic and was built in 1923.

Our Lady and St Wilfrid's Catholic Church, dating from 1871, was destroyed by fire in 2003 and rebuilt in 2015. There is also a Baptist Church in the town centre, opened in 1875. The Methodist community meets in the hall of the Catholics.

In the 2011 census, just under 60% of the population defined themselves as Christian, about 30% as having no religion, with about 9% declining to answer and very few people identifying with other religions.

== Sport and recreation ==
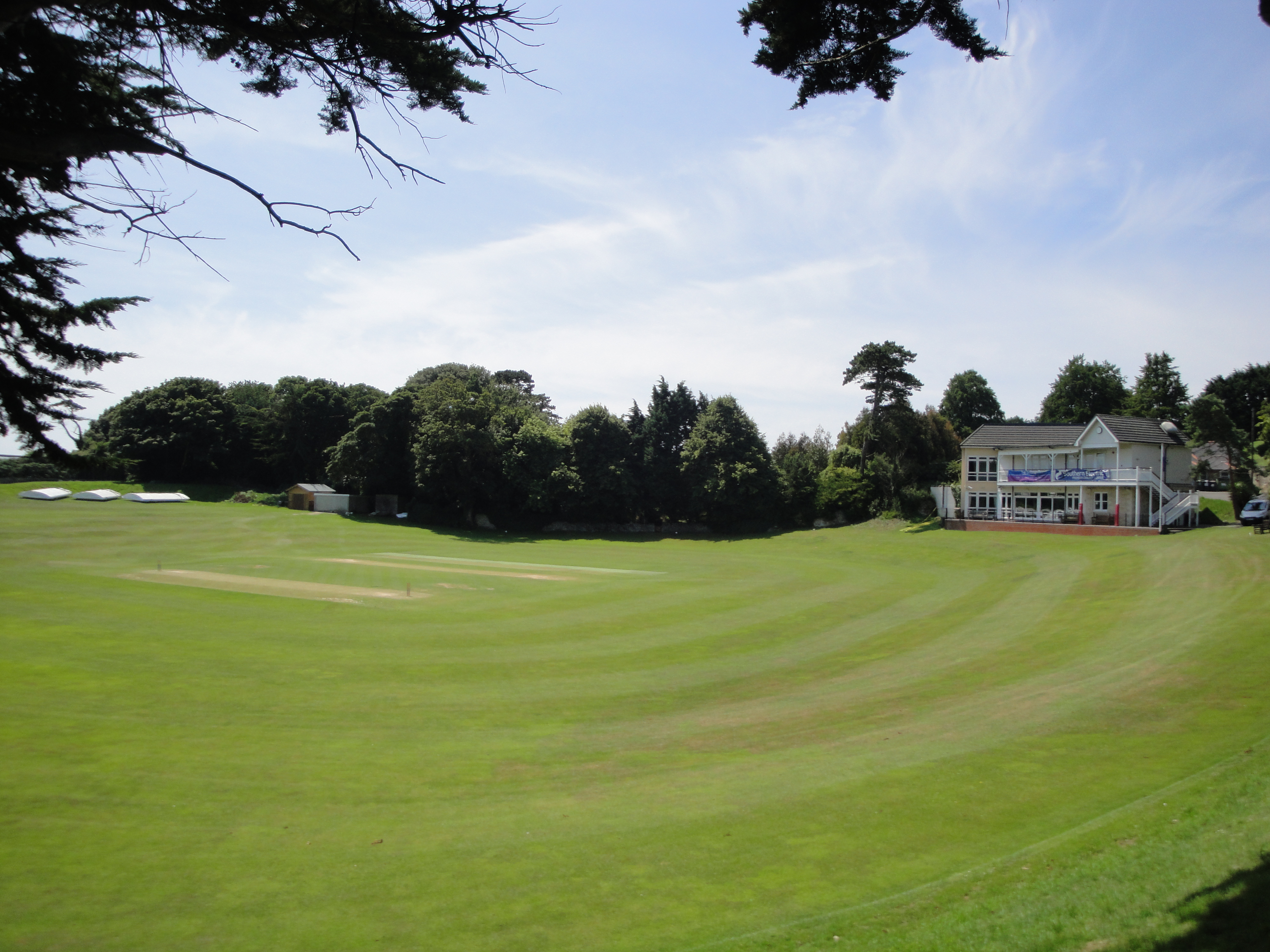
Ventnor Cricket Ground, July 2011

Founded in 1850, Ventnor Cricket Club has several active teams, and plays on its ground just east of the Botanic Garden. Its pitch is unusual in that it is not flat but situated in a bowl, rising toward the boundaries. This has prevented them in being promoted beyond Division Two in the Southern Premier Cricket League.

Ventnor Rugby Club runs two men's teams, and plays at its ground west of the town on the Whitwell Road.

Ventnor Football Club is adjacent to the rugby club, with the grounds housing the Men’s & Rew Valley youth teams. Founded in 1883, they are affiliated to the Hampshire Football Association and are long serving members of the Isle of Wight League - a competition they joined as founder members in 1898.

There is a riding school and equestrian centre north of Ventnor on the road to Godshill.

Rew Valley Sports Centre, in Upper Ventnor, adjacent to the Free School and St Francis Primary school, is available for the local community to use outside of school hours.

Ventnor has a bowling club, with a ground just north of the town centre. Ventnor Golf Club has the oldest course on the island, founded in 1892. The course on the high downs north-west of the town centre has views over the English Channel. The putting green in Ventnor Park is open during the summer.

Ventnor Tennis Club has four hard courts just north of the town centre. The town also has an angling club with a clubhouse at Wheeler's Bay.

Ventnor beach and pumping station, April 2018

Ventnor skatepark, at the eastern end of the esplanade, is currently closed following vandalism to the ramps. It is seeking funding to get the ramps repaired and re-opened.

Ventnor beach, with its mix of sand and shingle, is popular with both locals and visitors. Adjacent is Ventnor Haven with a fresh fish shop and a fish and chips outlet. The Isle of Wight Coastal Path runs along the esplanade, and the beach is dog-friendly from October through April. Recreational diving is popular offshore, owing to the number of shipwrecks.

The Isle of Wight has been named as the best place in the world for cycling by Lonely Planet, and Ventnor is on the route of the annual randonnée.

== Notable people ==
Residents of the town are known as Ventnorians.

=== In history ===
Resident at Osborne House in East Cowes, Queen Victoria visited Ventnor on the recommendation of her physician Sir James Clark. Its Royal Hotel was so named after enjoying her patronage in 1855.

Ventnor's popularity during the Victorian era attracted many writers. Charles Dickens spent the summer of 1849 in Bonchurch and wrote part of David Copperfield there. He described Bonchurch as "the prettiest place I ever saw in my life, at home or abroad". Thomas Babington Macaulay spent some of 1850 at Madeira Hall, where he wrote part of his History of England. Elizabeth Missing Sewell lived in Ventnor and founded St Boniface Diocesan School. Pearl Craigie spent many summers there, and leased St Lawrence Lodge.

The poet and critic Algernon Charles Swinburne spent his childhood in Bonchurch and his family grave is there. John Sterling purchased Hillside in 1843 and died of TB the following year aged 38. Canon Edmund Venables lived in Bonchurch between 1853 and 1864; in 1867 he compiled A Guide to the Undercliff. The Russian writer Ivan Turgenev stayed in Ventnor during 1860 and is reputed to have started Fathers and Sons there. Karl Marx rented a house at 1 St Boniface Gardens for the winters of 1881-2 and 1882-3, having written to Engels after his first visit that "this island is a little paradise”. John Leech, caricaturist, lived in Hill Cottage, Bonchurch Shute.

Other notable 19th-century residents include William Campbell Sleigh, lawyer and politician, and diplomat and MP Edward Eastwick, both of whom retired to and died in Ventnor. The admiral Earl Jellicoe also retired there. The organist and composer Edwin Lemare was born and spent his early childhood in Ventnor. The composer Edward Elgar and Caroline Alice Elgar spent three weeks on honeymoon there in 1889.

In the 20th century, Alfred Noyes, poet and playwright, lived in Ventnor from 1929 until his death in 1958. The author Henry De Vere Stacpoole lived in Bonchurch from 1930 until his death in 1951. American businessman John Morgan Richards owned Steephill Castle from 1903 until his death in 1918. The actor Sir John Martin-Harvey owned the Cottage in Bonchurch; Lady Harvey established the adjacent home for nurses.

=== Contemporary ===
- The band the Bees are from Ventnor. The band Champs are from Niton, just outside of Ventnor.
- The actor Brian Murphy was born in Ventnor.

== Media and artistic references ==
- Lady Audley's Secret by Mary Elizabeth Braddon, published in 1862, has a chapter set in Ventnor's clifftop cemetery.
- The 1969 film Battle of Britain recreated the 1940 bombing raid on RAF Ventnor, using models of the radio masts.
- The 1973 film That'll Be the Day, starring David Essex, Rosemary Leach and Ringo Starr, was partly filmed on the island including in Ventnor.
- The 2011 novel The Guitar Man, by Maurice Taylor, is set in Ventnor.
- The 2019 novel The Moondish, by Benjamin Roberts, is set in Ventnor and Bonchurch.
- An independent film Death in Ventnor was made by David George in 2009.
- A 2016 edition of BBC's Countryfile featured Ventnor downs and the Botanic Garden.
- Ventnor is the subject of an edition of Mark Steel's in Town broadcast on BBC Radio 4 in January 2018.
- The music video for the 2018 Alessi's Ark single DLD (Door Light Dream) was filmed on the Undercliff and in Ventnor.

== Other places named Ventnor ==
- Ventnor is a seaside area on the north of Phillip Island, off the southern coast of Australia.
- Ventnor City is a coastal city in New Jersey adjacent to Atlantic City in the United States.
- Ventnor, Eastern Cape is a farmstead in the Eastern Cape province of South Africa.
- Ventnor, Ontario is a hamlet in Ontario, Canada, near Cardinal.
- Ventnor, Queensland is a locality in the North Burnett Region, Queensland, Australia

== See also ==
- List of places on the Isle of Wight
- Coastline of the United Kingdom
- Battle of Bonchurch
- A3055 road
