= Henri Secretan =

Swiss physician (1856–1916)

Henri-François Secretan
- Born: 22 February 1856; Neuchâtel
- Died: 5 March 1916 (aged 60)
- Occupation: physician
- Known for: Secretan's syndrome

Henri-François Secretan (22 February 1856 – 5 March 1916) was a Swiss physician who first described the Secretan's syndrome. He was the son of philosopher Charles Secrétan (1815-1895).

He attended the Faculté des lettres in Lausanne, then studied medicine in Geneva, Pisa and Paris. After travels to Italy, France, Spain, Germany, Austria, England and Algeria, he became a physician in Lausanne (from 1885). He was known as a specialist in regard to medical accidents.

He was the author of "L'assurance contre les accidents: observations chirurgicales et professionelles : estimation des dommages : traitement des plaies-Atrophie" (1902).
