= Compton Chine to Steephill Cove SSSI =

Protected area on the Isle of Wight, England

Compton Chine to Steephill Cove
- Site of Special Scientific Interest
- Location of Compton Chine to Steephill Cove.
- Area of search: Isle of Wight
- Grid reference: SZ489763
- Interest: Biological and Geological
- Area: 629.2 ha (1,555 acres)
- Notification date: 2003
- Location map: Natural England

Compton Chine to Steephill Cove is a 629.2 hectares (1,555 acres) Site of Special Scientific Interest which extends from Compton Chine on the south-west coast of the Isle of Wight along the coast, around St. Catherine's Point to Steephill Cove, just west of Ventnor on the south-east coast of the island. This is the largest SSSI area on the island. The site was notified in 2003 for both its biological and geological features.

== Sources ==
- Natural England citation sheet
