= Ventnor Town Hall =

Municipal building in Ventnor, Isle of Wight, England

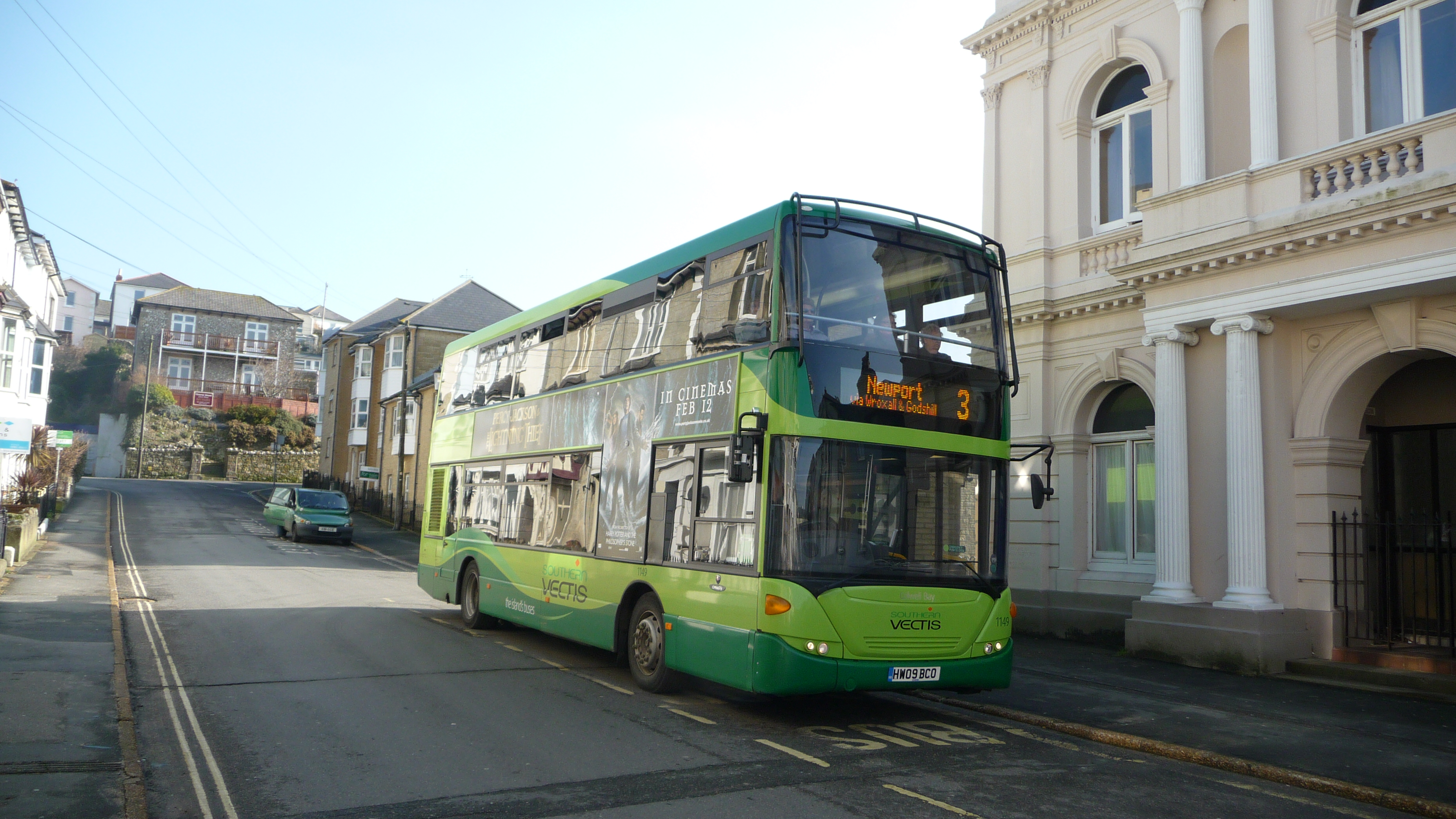
- The building (right) in 2010

- Shown on the Isle of Wight
- 50.5946°N 1.2024°W
- Location: Albert Street, Ventnor

History
- Built: 1878

Site notes
- Architect: Theodore Ridley Saunders
- Architectural style: Italianate style

Listed Building – Grade II
- Official name: Town Hall
- Designated: 14 July 1976
- Reference no.: 1224297

Ventnor Town Hall is a historic building in Albert Street in Ventnor, a town on the Isle of Wight, in England. The facade of the building, behind which new flats have been created, is a Grade II listed building.

== History ==
The building was commissioned as the Undercliffe Assembly Rooms. The site selected was on the south side of Albert Street, a significant thoroughfare in the town. The foundation stone for the new building was laid by Annie Snowden Henry of East Dene in Bonchurch, on 20 December 1877. (Note: Annie Snowden Henry was the wife of the former member of parliament for South East Lancashire, John Snowdon Henry, who had settled in the area later in his life.) It was designed by a local architect, Theodore Ridley Saunders, in the Italianate style, built by a local builder, Henry Ingrams & Sons, in ashlar stone, and was completed in 1878.

The building originally consisted of a large hall, with a stage and seating for 600 people, retiring rooms, and rooms for the school board. After the local board of health was succeeded by Ventnor Urban District Council in 1894, the new council used the town hall as their meeting place. The building was also used as a venue for public meetings and, in September 1924, the future Leader of the Labour Party, George Lansbury, and the historian, Philip Bagwell, spoke to a packed audience there.

There was a fire at the building in 1936, but the local fire brigade delayed responding as they mistakenly believed that the firing of a maroon to summon them was merely a salute to the maiden voyage of the RMS Queen Mary.

The building continued to serve as the meeting place of the local council, until it relocated to Salisbury Gardens in about 1960. The town hall was then converted into a wig factory, and later became a clothing factory. However, the main hall remained available for use as a theatre.

From the mid-1970s, it was a nightclub, known as "the Coconut Grove", but this closed following a serious fire in 1978. The building was vacant for several years, during which time it suffered two further fires. In 1994, most of the structure behind the façade was demolished and new flats were created behind the façade.

== Architecture ==
The two-storey building is rusticated on the ground floor and the entire front is stuccoed. The central bay, which is projected forward, features a full-height portico, formed by a round headed doorway with an architrave and a keystone flanked by Ionic order columns supporting an entablature on the ground floor, and by a round headed window with an architrave and a keystone flanked by Corinthian order columns supporting a cornice, a frieze and a modillioned pediment on the first floor. The outer bays are fenestrated by round headed windows with architraves and keystones on both floors and, on the first floor, the outer bays are flanked on the outside by pairs of Corinthian order pilasters supporting a modillioned cornice and a parapet. The building has been grade II listed since 1976.
