= Secretan's syndrome =

- Specialty: Psychiatry

Secretan's syndrome is a rare condition of hard edema and traumatic hyperplasia of the back of the hand or of the lower extremities. Most experts view it as a self-inflicted condition.

It was first described in 1901 by Henri-François Secretan, a Swiss insurance physician. He described a condition characterized by a hard, sometimes cyanotic edema (Charcot's blue edema) on the dorsal aspect of the hand. This condition which some people think is a self-inflicted (factitious) condition usually starts with a small accidental injury of the dorsum of the hand. This is usually followed by swelling edema and cyanosis of the dorsum of the usually right hand. The edema is thought to be secondary to excessive inflammation the condition slowly burns out with the edema being replaced by fibrosis surrounding the extensor tendons of the hand.
