= St Catherine's School, Ventnor =

Coordinates: 50.5959°N 1.2081°W

St Catherine's School

Location
- Grove Road; Ventnor, Isle of Wight, PO38 1TT; England

Information
- Type: Non-maintained special school
- Religious affiliation: Church of England
- Established: 1915
- Local authority: Isle of Wight
- Department for Education URN: 118226 Tables
- Ofsted: Reports
- Head teacher: Sarah Thompson
- Staff: 100
- Gender: Mixed
- Age: 7 to 19
- Enrolment: 66
- Website: http://www.stcatherines.org.uk/index.php

St Catherine's School, in Ventnor, on the Isle of Wight in the United Kingdom, is an independent non-maintained residential special school for children and young people aged seven to 19 years who have speech, language and communication needs. The school has charitable status. Many students have multiple conditions and a range of abilities are supported.

== Early history ==
The school was previously a nursing home for adults with tuberculosis. It was called St Catherine's Home and opened in 1879. The original nursing staff were the Anglican Sisters of St Margaret's, East Grinstead. The building taken over for the home had originally been called Peak House; in 1890 an additional building, originally called Grove House, was bought. Hansard notes in 1912 that people with tuberculosis were being sent to St Catherine's Home.

In 1915 Sister Kathleen re-organised the home as a children's home and school for children with tuberculosis. An additional building, Elm Grove, was acquired in 1923. In 1926 numbers 1 and 2 Grove Hill Cottages (opposite the main building) were acquired for accommodating the older girls. Berkshire Villa was taken over in 1936 and renamed 'St. Anne's’ and was used as a residence for the Sisters. A chapel was consecrated in 1925.

In the 1930s and 1940s the school was known as St. Catherine's Home Residential Open Air School.

It was during the 1930s that the number of children at St Catherine's Home reached its peak. Sometimes there were up to 160 children in residence. During the war, a large house known as The Hermitage in Whitwell was taken over and all the children in the younger age groups were housed there. Only the older boys remained in Ventnor. They were divided between the buildings to minimise the number of casualties should any bomb damage occur. In the summer of 1945 all the children returned to Ventnor.

In 1960 Sister Kathleen was reluctantly compelled to give up her position as Sister-in-Charge as she was then 87 years old. Sister Joanna was appointed as Sister-in-Charge and she introduced the going home of children for School holidays at Christmas, Easter and August.

In the 1960s, the school was for younger children with asthma only, as a "feeder" school to a school in East Sussex, called Pilgrims.

The nuns left St Catherine's in the late 1970s and a speech and language unit was installed.

== More recent history ==
The school expanded its site in 2019. It also opened a sports centre for pupils in the same year.

== Inspections ==
- In 2004, the Commission for Social Care Inspection (CSCI) inspected boarding welfare provision at the school and judged that "The school provides good, person centred support for a group of students who have diverse and complex needs".
- In 2006, a further CSCI inspection found no areas needing development.
- A further unannounced inspection the same year judged that "the boarding department was operating effectively and addressing the assessed care needs of the young people being accommodated".
- In 2007 and 2008, Ofsted inspections judged the school as Good.
- In 2009, Ofsted inspected again and judged the school Outstanding.
- In 2010 and 2011, Ofsted inspections judged the school Good.
- In 2012, Ofsted inspection judged the school Good with some Outstanding features.
- In 2013 and 2015, Ofsted inspections judged the school Good.
- In 2017, 2018 and 2019, Ofsted inspections judged the school Outstanding.
- As of 2020, the school's most recent judgement was from March 2020, when Ofsted found that the school requires Improvement. The sub-judgement on Leadership and Management was Inadequate. There were concerns about staff understanding of online safety, and of the conditions of buildings following extreme weather. Managers told Ofsted that they would take the findings of the inspection seriously.
