= Ventnor Botanic Garden =

Isle of Wight botanical garden

- The Australian section within The Gardens, February 2007.
- Interactive map of Ventnor Botanic Garden
- Type: Botanic
- Location: Ventnor, Isle of Wight
- Coordinates: 50.5892°N 1.2278°W
- Opened: 1970
- Owner: Freehold owned by Isle of Wight Council, leased to Ventnor Botanic Garden CIC
- Operator: Ventnor Botanic Garden CIC
- Website: botanic.co.uk

Ventnor Botanic Garden is a botanic garden located in Ventnor, Isle of Wight. It was founded in 1970, by Sir Harold Hillier, and donated to the Isle of Wight Council.

Its collection comprises worldwide temperate and subtropical trees and shrubs organised by region. The garden's unusual climate is more akin to the Mediterranean and enables a wide variety of plants considered too tender for much of mainland Britain to be grown. These grow in the open air, and benefit from the moist and sheltered microclimate of the south-facing Undercliff landslip area on the Isle of Wight coast. When frost does occur it is usually of short duration and not of great severity.

== History ==
The garden is on the site of the Royal National Hospital for Diseases of the Chest, a sanatorium established there to exploit the same mild climate. Founded by Arthur Hill Hassall, designed by local architect Thomas Hellyer and opened in 1869 as the National Cottage Hospital for Consumption and Diseases of the Chest, it offered 130 separate south-facing bedrooms for its patients. The hospital closed in 1964, made obsolete by drug treatment of tuberculosis, and was demolished in 1969.

In 1970, the site was initially redeveloped as the Steephill Pleasure Gardens before Sir Harold Hillier's involvement in its more extensive development as a botanical garden. Despite the generally mild weather, plants had to be carefully selected to tolerate the shallow alkaline soil and salt winds, and the garden suffered serious damage in the unusually hard winter of 1986–7, the Great Storm of 1987, and another major storm in January 1990.

A large greenhouse was built in 1986 and opened in 1987, where tropical plants are grown, including a pool containing 22 tonnes of heated water showing Giant Waterlily in the summer months, with surrounding Egyptian Blue Lotus flowers.

In 2005, a new Palm Garden was opened, building on existing hardy and half-hardy palm trees on the site, including some specimens of Trachycarpus fortunei or Chusan palm, which date from the late-19th century and are the oldest outdoor-grown palm trees in the United Kingdom. In 2021, the collection of Arecaceae (palm trees) was given National Plant Collection status.

The garden was managed by the Isle of Wight Council until 2012 when it transferred to Ventnor Botanic Garden CIC. Parking charges were replaced by an entry fee. The curator of the garden from 1986 until 2011 was Simon Goodenough, who was succeeded by Chris Kidd.

== Access ==
The garden is located alongside the A3055 road, and buses on Southern Vectis' Route 6 stop nearby in Park Avenue. There are scenic walks from nearby Ventnor town.

== Controversy ==
There has been much criticism of the current management of the gardens in recent years, with many critics, especially horticultural professionals, claiming that the much-vaunted Ventnor Method is just an excuse for inadequate staff numbers and neglect of the collections and planting schemes. Prominent among these is former curator Simon Goodenough.
