= Steephill =

Hamlet on the Isle of Wight, England

Coordinates: 50.5907°N 1.2233°W

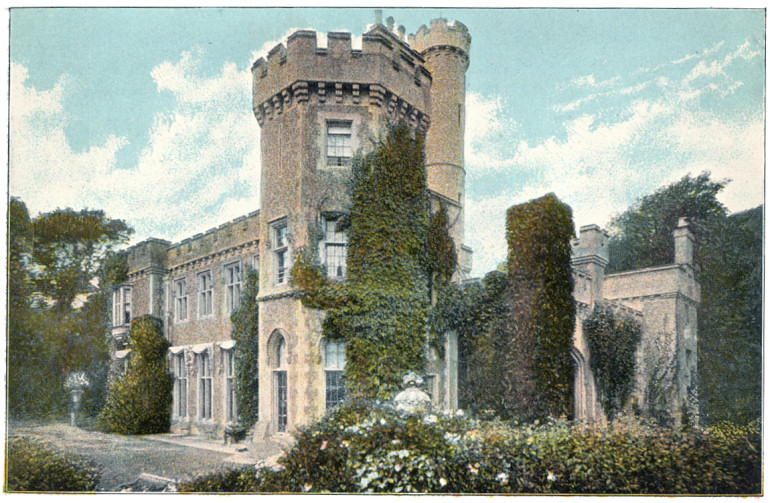
Steephill Castle c 1910

Steephill is a hamlet near Ventnor, Isle of Wight, England, previously the location of a Victorian country estate with a castle-style mansion, Steephill Castle, which was demolished to build bungalows in the 1960s. Steephill itself now forms part of the suburban development westward from Ventnor.

Steephill Cove, on the coast some 400 yards to the south, has several kiosks and self-catering cottages. Fish can be bought beneath a sign which states "Wheeler and Sons; Fishermen since the 1500s". The cove is accessible only on foot; it is about 200 yards from Undercliff Drive, and is on the Isle of Wight Coastal Path directly adjacent to Ventnor Botanic Garden.

Steephill was the location of a country estate since the time of Hans Stanley, governor of the Isle of Wight, who built there in landscaped surroundings a rustic-style house called The Cottage during his first term of office 1764–1768. After his death the estate was purchased by Wilbraham Tollemache. It was his favourite residence until his death in 1821, after which the estate was sold in 1828 to John Hambrough, who built Steephill Castle in 1835 on the site of The Cottage. In 1836 Hambrough paid for the construction of St Catherine's Church, Ventnor's parish church.

His descendant Windsor Dudley Cecil Hambrough was the victim in the Ardlamont House Murder of 1893 and is buried in the churchyard of St Catherine's Church.

Its next owner was John Morgan Richards, an American businessman who bought it in 1903. His daughter, the novelist Pearl Mary Teresa Craigie (pseudonym "John Oliver Hobbes") lived near the Castle from 1900 to 1906, writing a number of her works there.

The Castle was auctioned after Richards' death after World War I. It then saw service as a hotel with the Holiday Friendship Association (with a period as a school during World War II) until 1959, when upkeep and fire safety issues made this use increasingly unviable. Ethel Garton my grandmother was the manager of Steep Hill Castle in that last year of 1959. Aged 5 I distinctly remember the austere and baronial grand architecture in that warm sunny summer of 59, it had a very church like character. Adder snakes were common in the undergrowth and the path through the woods to the cove was overgrown and wild in that year. Unused, its condition deteriorated thereafter, until a demolition order was obtained in 1963.
