= Holloway Manor =

Holloway Manor (also Holewey, Hollowey) was a manor house on the Isle of Wight, situated within the Newchurch parish. It lies just to the north of Ventnor. It was held of the honour of Carisbrooke Castle and formed part of the estate of John de Lisle in the Island at the end of the 13th century. It followed the descent of South Shorwell until 1641, when it is mentioned for the last time. It is probably the same as the modern Ventnor Manor, which is mentioned for the first time in 1755 and then belonged to the Pophams of South Shorwell. Nearly all the land in Ventnor was sold in 1820 by the Hill family to John Hamborough and building speculators, and the manor no longer exists. Holloway can now only be identified by the Holy Well spring on the down, from which possibly the holding derived its name. In a dispute as to boundaries in 1617, witnesses deposed that Ventnor, Littletown and Holloway were tithings of themselves and that Sir Edward Dennis' ancestors kept court and law day at Holloway, where his tenants did suit royal.
