= Ventnor Towers Hotel =

Hotel on the Isle of Wight, England

Coordinates: 50°35′48.4″N 1°11′37.3″W

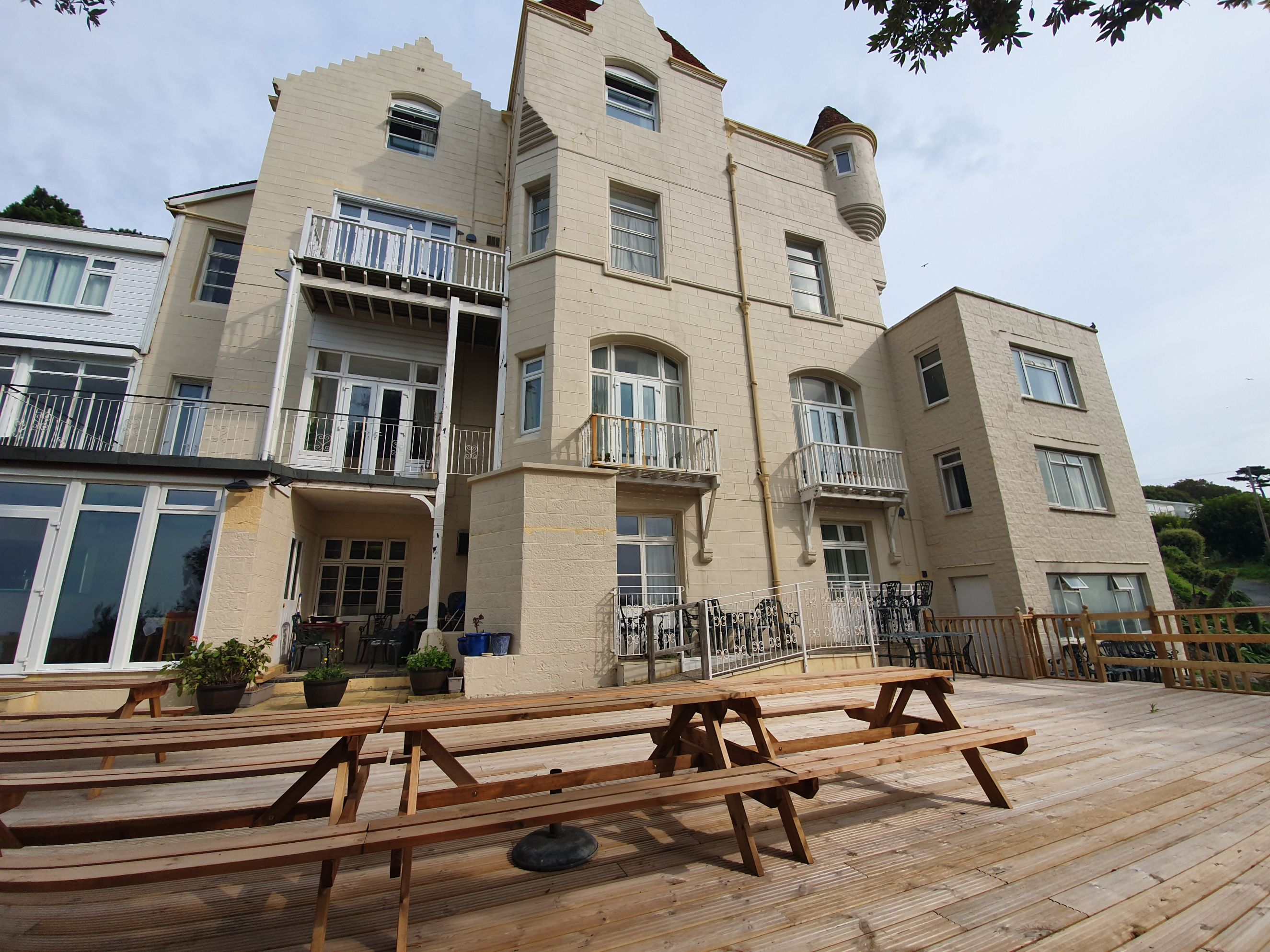
Ventnor Towers hotel from the outside seating area

Ventnor Towers Hotel was a large hotel in Ventnor on the Isle of Wight. The building was constructed in 1872 and has been extended multiple times since its initial construction. It is notably one of the few hotels on the Isle of Wight to have a functioning Helipad. The hotel is south-facing, and sits little more than a few hundred feet from the steep cliffs that give access to Bonchurch. Documents on display inside the hotel mention of a similar hotel in the neighbouring town of Shanklin having been built around the same time as this hotel, but it has long since been defunct.

As of 2023, the building was standing empty, pending renovation into a large house, restoring it to its original purpose, as the building had reportedly originally been constructed as a mansion prior to being converted to a hotel.

The building is now for sale at a guide price of £1.2m. According to reports, it has many possible uses including a house, flats, hotel, air BnB, glamping and further dwellings in the 3 acres of grounds. Search Rightmove PO38 1QT

== Alternate names ==
For a short time between the mid-1990s and the mid-2000s, the hotel was managed by Best Western, and was known as Best Western Ventnor. After the owners chose to manage the hotel instead, the hotel's name reverted to its current name.
