= John Morgan Richards =

- Born: February 16, 1841; Aurora, Cayuga County, New York, United States
- Died: August 11, 1918 (aged 77); Isle of Wight, United Kingdom
- Occupation: Businessman
- Spouse: Laura Hortense Arnold (m. 1863)

John Morgan Richards (February 16, 1841 – August 11, 1918), was an American businessman and entrepreneur who made his fortune from the promotion of patent medicines and American cigarettes in Britain. He was the father of the novelist Pearl Mary Teresa Craigie (who worked as John Oliver Hobbes).

== Early life ==
Richards was born in Aurora, Cayuga County, New York, the son of Dr. James Richards, a Presbyterian minister of English descent, and Elizabeth Beals.

A Boston resident in adulthood, he married Laura Hortense Arnold in 1863, and moved to London permanently in 1867, though retaining his American citizenship all his life. The Richards attended the City Temple.

== Career ==
His best known business achievement was a major and successful marketing campaign from 1877 onward to popularise the cigarette in Britain. This was achieved through "vigorous advertising and some ingenious and original methods of trade promotion" such as offering chemists an incentive - he would pay for their tobacco trading license - if they supplied his cigarettes, Allen & Ginter's Virginia-made "Richmond Gems". He also marketed the patent medicines Carter's Little Liver Pills and Dr. Williams' Pink Pills for Pale People.

He was chairman of the American Society in London, and a member of the Reform Club.

== Personal life and death ==
In 1903 he purchased Steephill Castle near Ventnor, Isle of Wight, where he lived for the remainder of his life. He largely retired from business after the early death in 1906 of his daughter Pearl Craigie, who lived and worked part-time in her own villa near Steephill.

His Times obituary recalled him as "the pioneer of a doubtful benefit", though crediting him with having "helped greatly to promote trade relations between England and the United States".

== Publications ==
- With John Bull and Jonathan. Reminiscences of sixty years of an American's life in England and in the United States (pub. D. Appleton, New York, 1906) Internet Archive
- The life of John Oliver Hobbes: told in her correspondence with numerous friends (J. Murray, London, 1911, Internet Archive)
- Almost Fairyland - personal notes concerning the Isle of Wight (1914) - a privately circulated appreciation of the Isle of Wight. Available online: Almost Fairyland copy at Bodleian Library
