= Christian Grobet =

Swiss politician and lawyer

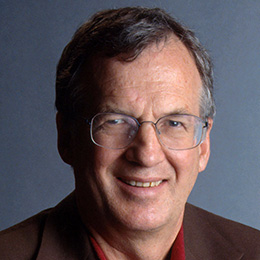
- Born: 26 July 1941; New York,
- Died: 17 December 2023 (aged 82); Geneva), Switzerland
- Organization: Social Democratic Party of Switzerland

Christian Grobet (26 July 1941, New York City – 17 December 2023, Geneva) (Place of origin Vallorbe), was a Swiss politician, member of the Socialist Party until 1993, then of parties of left.

He was a deputy for the Canton of Geneva in the National Council from 1975 to 1982 and from 1995 to 2003 and a State Councilor from 1981 to 1993, the head of the Department of Public Works.

== Biography ==
Christian Grobet was born on July 26, 1941, in New York. He was originally from Vallorbe, in the canton of Vaud.

He studied at the University of Geneva, and obtained a degree in law and a degree in economics. He then practiced as a lawyer, in his own firm and for Mieterverband (tenant defense association) for 13 years.

== Political career ==
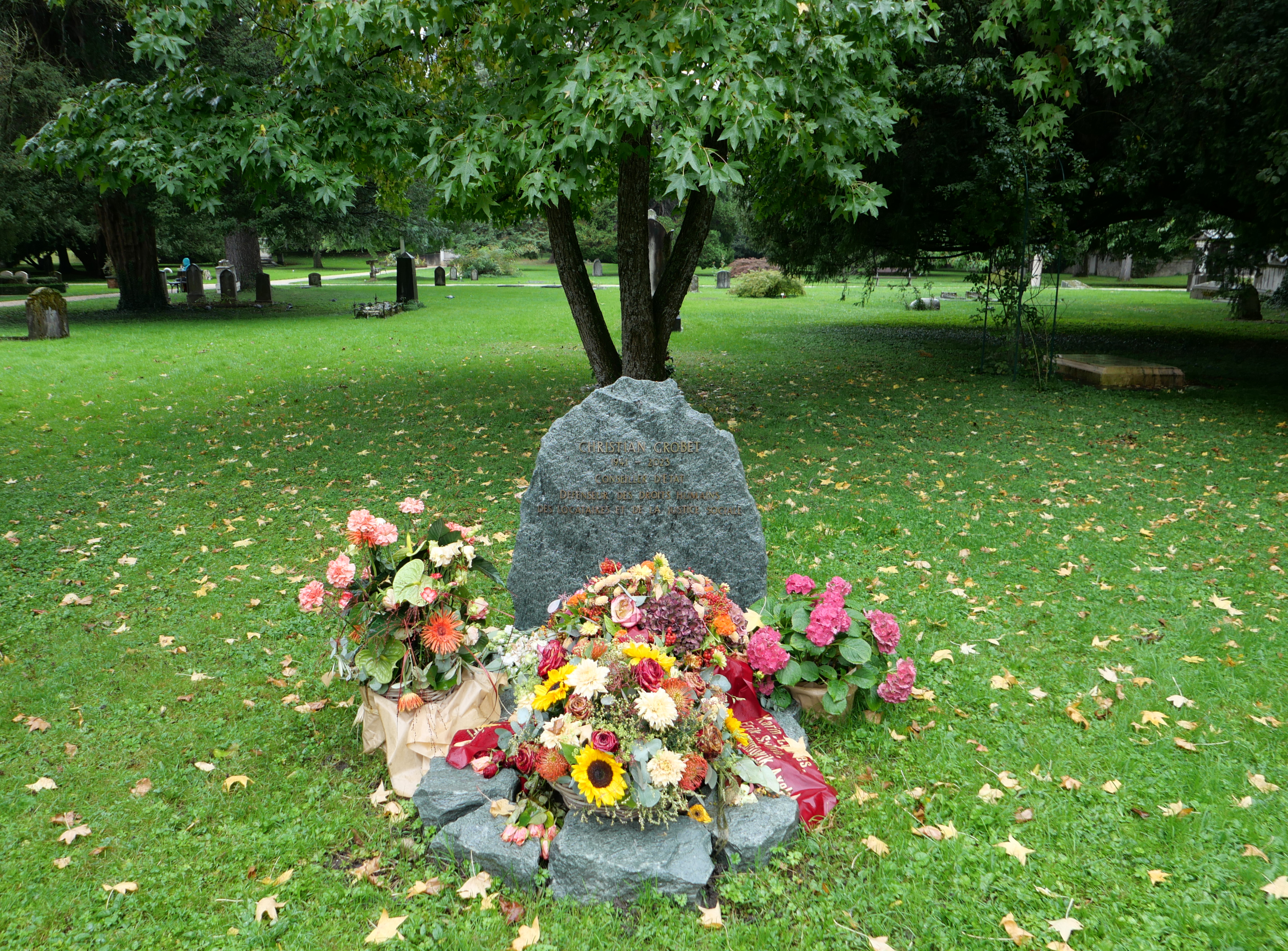
The grave in 2024.

Grobet sat as an elected representative of the Socialist Party on the Geneva Municipal Council from 1967 to 1970, and as a deputy on the Grand Council from 1969 to 1981. He nominated himself for the Council of State in 1980, but was beaten by Aloys Werner. He was elected to the Council of State the following year, he served there for twelve years at the head of the public works department.

In 2008, Grobet was elected to the Geneva constituent assembly to prepare a new constitution, on the list of AVIVO (defense of retirees) which obtained nine elected officials.

Christian Grobet served again as a member of the Grand Council from 1993 to 2005. . In 2005, his electoral list failed to meet the threshold, and he was not re-elected.

== Death ==
Grobet died on17 December 2023. He is buried at the Cimetière des Rois.
