= Charles Secrétan =

Swiss philosopher

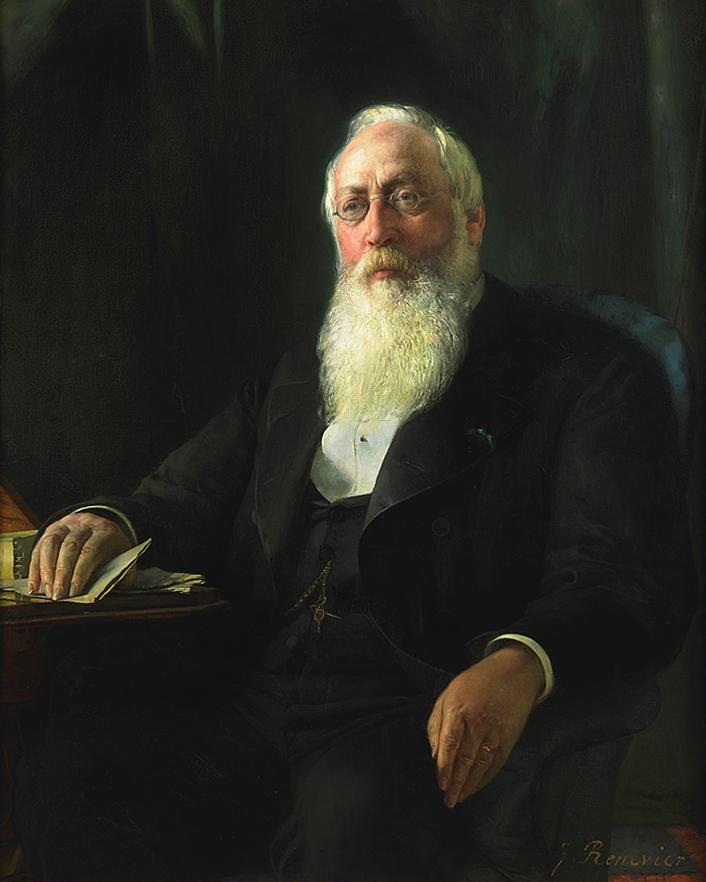
- Born: January 19, 1815; Lausanne, Switzerland
- Died: January 21, 1895 (aged 80); Lausanne, Switzerland
- Occupations: Professor of philosophy, lawyer and author
- Known for: Founding Revue suisse

Charles Secrétan (Note: Initially spelled Secretan (without acute accent) in the manner of the family members who preceded him; Secrétan would generally use the accented form from 1849 onward, but is attested to have signed a letter Secrétan as early as June 21, 1838.) (January 19, 1815 – January 21, 1895) was a Swiss academic philosopher, author of works about society and politics, and a lawyer.

He was born and educated in Lausanne, and earned a law degree at the Academy there. In 1835 he briefly assisted Alexandre Vinet in Basel, but soon went to Munich to study under Friedrich von Schelling. By 1838 he returned to Switzerland to practice law.

In 1837 or 1838 he founded and briefly edited the Revue suisse, an intellectual magazine. By 1841 he had attained a professorship and taught philosophy and its history at the Academy of Lausanne, but on December 2, 1846 he and 7 other professors were dismissed by the radical-led cantonal government that had recently come to power. (Note: Days later, the students of the Academy held a banquet in honour of the dismissed professors, at which Secrétan offered remarks.) He moved to Paris and then Neuchâtel where he taught at the gymnasium from about 1851–1866. In 1866, he resumed his prior status at the Academy of Lausanne, and added a second professorship in natural law in 1874; he would hold both until his death. In 1877, after a lecture series in Montauban, he earned international recognition.

His first major work was Philosophie de la liberté (Philosophy of Liberty) in 1849, and he developed his social and political philosophy in Droit de la femme (Rights of the Woman, 1885) and Mon utopie (My Utopia, 1892). Politically, he opposed collectivism and rejected state-controlled apportionment of work as tantamount to tyranny. In concert with Vinet, he opposed the populist radicals who pressed for the submission of the church to the state, but in so doing, allied himself with the aristocracy. In his writings, he explored the relationship between Christian religious philosophy and metaphysics.

In later life, he became a member of the French Académie des sciences morales et politiques (1883), and a chevalier of the French Legion of Honour. He was memorialized in a 1917 issue of Revue de théologie et de philosophie—ostensibly on the centenary of his birth, though actually somewhat later—wherein 6 articles were published concerning his life and philosophy, his socioeconomic observations, his morality, his metaphysics, his theology, and his works (435 items catalogued).

His family included his parents Samuel Secrétan and Sophie Dufour, and brother Edouard Secrétan (1813–1870). He was married to Marie Muller.

== Works ==
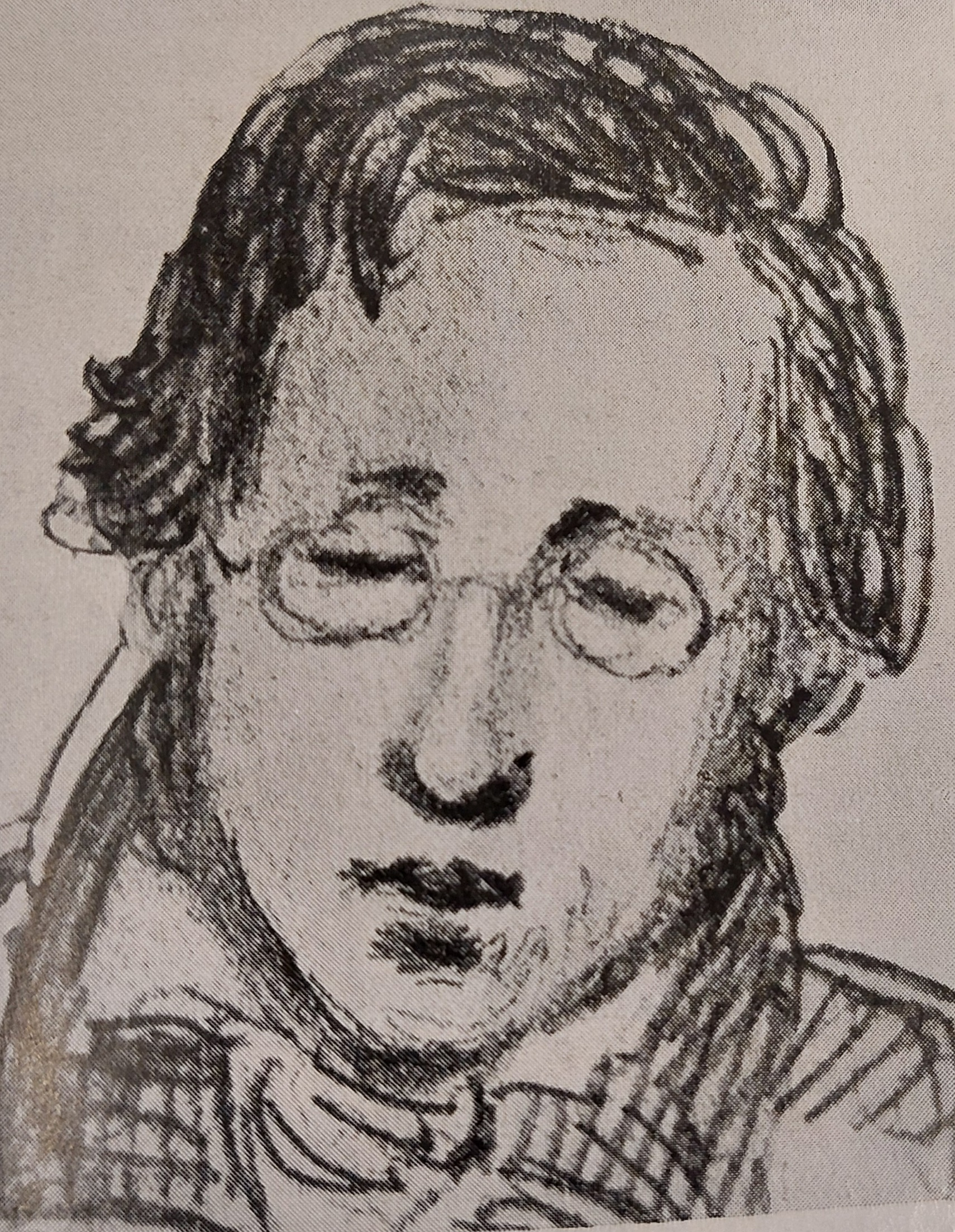
Secrétan in 1837, drawn by Alfred van Muyden

- De la philosophie de Leibniz (1840)
- Philosophie de la liberté (1849)
- Recherches de la méthode (1857)
- La raison et le christianisme (1863)
- Discours laïques (1877)
- Principes de la morale (1883)
- Droit de la femme (1885)
- La civilisation et la croyance (1887)
- Études sociales (1889)
- Les droits de l'humanité (1890)
- Mon utopie (1892)
