= List of people from the Isle of Wight =

This is a list of notable people born in or strongly associated with the Isle of Wight, alphabetically within categories.

== Born on the Isle of Wight ==
- Dr Thomas Arnold, headmaster of Rugby School and immortalised in Tom Brown's Schooldays, born in Cowes
- King Arwald, last pagan king in England and last king of the Isle of Wight, died 686
- Lee Bradbury, ex professional footballer, currently manager of Dagenham & Redbridge, born in Cowes
- Danny Briggs, Hampshire and England cricketer, born in Newport
- Sarah Close, singer-songwriter
- Sophie Dawes, Baronne de Feuchères, born in St Helens
- Craig Douglas (Terry Perkins) pop singer, born 1941 in Newport, topped the charts in 1959 with Only Sixteen
- Arthur Percy Morris Fleming, born 1881 in Newport, electrical engineer and pioneer in the development of radio and submarine detection
- Thomas Fleming, judge and Lord Chief Justice
- Uffa Fox, yacht designer
- Vivian Fuchs, Antarctic explorer
- Marius Goring, born Newport
- Maxwell Gray (Mary Gleed Tuttiett), novelist
- Lauran Hibberd Slacker-pop singer, born in Newport
- Sheila Hancock, actress, born in Blackgang
- Robert Hooke, scientist, born in Freshwater
- Jeremy Irons, actor, born in Cowes and raised in St Helens
- Phill Jupitus, comedian, born in Newport
- Mark King, born in Gurnard nr. Cowes, bass player and vocalist in pop/funk band Level 42
- Suri Krishnamma, film director and writer, born in Shanklin
- Cliff Michelmore, television presenter and producer born in Cowes
- Albert Midlane, failed ironmonger, poet and hymn-writer was born in Newport
- Anthony Minghella, film director; born in Ryde; his parents run the Minghella's Ice Cream company on the Island; his film The English Patient includes footage of Shanklin Pier; on accepting his Best Picture Oscar, he said, "This is a great day for the Isle of Wight!"
- Loretta Minghella, charity executive and solicitor
- Brian Murphy, actor, born in Ventnor
- Noel Odell, geologist and mountaineer, born in St Lawrence
- Queen Osburga, daughter of Oslac, Chief Butler of England and mother of King Alfred the Great
- Adam Pacitti, Leader of Cultaholic, born in Ryde
- James Pellow actor and writer, born in Ryde
- Arthur Cecil Pigou, economist and proponent of Pigouvian taxes, born in Ryde
- Albert Pollard, historian, born in Ryde
- Horace Rawlins, golfer, winner of the first U.S. Open in 1895
- Jake Scrimshaw, professional footballer
- Henry Sewell, first Prime Minister of New Zealand, born on the island in 1807 and lived there until emigrating to New Zealand at the age of 45
- Kelly Sotherton, heptathlete, born in Newport
- Polly Toynbee, journalist, born at Yafford
- George Westmore, founder of Hollywood's first make-up department, born 1879 in Newport. His son Bud Westmore is credited as make-up artist on over 450 movies
- Harry Frederick Whitchurch V.C., born in Sandown
- Eric Charles Twelves Wilson V.C., born in Sandown in 1912

== Raised on the Isle of Wight ==
- E. Power Biggs, concert organist
- Frank Cadogan Cowper, artist, raised at Lisle Court, Wootton
- Uffa Fox, raised in Cowes
- William Hutt, MP and colonial administrator, educated in Ryde
- George, 2nd Earl Jellicoe, at St. Lawrence Hall, Ventnor
- Donna Langley, film executive and chairwoman of Universal Pictures, raised on the island.
- Fidelis Morgan, actress and writer, raised in Bonchurch
- Nicholas Dingley alias Razzle, drummer for Hanoi Rocks, raised in Binstead
- Algernon Charles Swinburne, poet, raised in East Dene, Bonchurch
- Bear Grylls, climber, youngest Briton to reach the summit of Mount Everest and live; survival expert; host of Man vs. Wild

== Lived on the Isle of Wight ==
- Sam Browne, soldier, retired to Ryde
- Master Gunner Daniel Cambridge VC (later Yeoman of the Guard), stationed at Redoubt Battery, Fort Redoubt, Freshwater Bay, until 1871 (Census)
- Julia Margaret Cameron, photographer, lived in Freshwater Bay
- Lewis Carroll, author, lived at Sandown while working on Alice in Wonderland
- Winston Churchill, visited Ventnor for extended periods throughout his life
- Helen Clare, soprano singer
- Sir Christopher Cockerell, inventor of the hovercraft, spent two years in East Cowes working on his prototypes
- E. E. Cowper, novelist, lived at Lisle Court, Wootton
- Frank Cowper, yachtsman and author; designed and lived at Lisle Court, Wootton
- Charles Darwin, naturalist, lived for a period in 1867 in the Kings Head Hotel in Sandown
- Charles Dickens, author, lived in Bonchurch for 3 months in 1849
- King Charles I, held prisoner in Carisbrooke Castle for a year
- Ken Dodd, comedian, had a holiday home at Freshwater Bay
- Jack Douglas, actor from a series of Carry On films
- Trevor Duncan, composer (known for the Dr Finlay's Casebook theme), lived in Bonchurch
- King Ethelred the Unready, fled to the Isle of Wight in 1012 from the Danes under Sweyn Forkbeard
- Gertrude Fenton, novelist and editor of the Carisbrooke magazine
- Uffa Fox, yacht designer, lived in Puckaster
- David Gascoyne, 20th-century surrealist poet
- Pamela Green, infamous nude model of the 1950s and 1960s, lived in Yarmouth with the dambuster Douglas Webb, DFM
- King Harold II and his brother Tostig Godwinson, have estates at Kern and Nunwell respectively
- Jet Harris, musician with The Shadows
- Peter de Heyno, defended the Carisbrooke Castle 1377 against French–Castilian troops
- Robyn Hitchcock, musician, lived in Yarmouth from the mid-1980s to the early 1990s, and cited it in many of his works of the period
- John Oliver Hobbes (Pearl Mary Teresa Craigie), novelist, lived part-time in Steephill, 1900–1906
- Geoffrey Hughes, actor, lived in Newport
- Lieutenant-Colonel Sir Samuel Raymond Jarvis died at his home, Cove Cottage in Ventnor, in 1868
- Admiral Sir John Jellicoe, lived at St. Lawrence Hall, Ventnor
- John Keats, poet, moved to the island in 1814; areas of Shanklin are named after him
- Kenneth Kendall, journalist and TV presenter, lived in Cowes where his partner owned an art gallery
- Charles Kingsley, spent childhood there
- Marek Larwood, actor and comedian
- Henry Wadsworth Longfellow, American poet, spent the summer in Shanklin in 1868
- Guglielmo Marconi did radio experiments in Alum Bay and Niton around 1900
- Karl Marx, lodged in Ryde in the 1870s and in Ventnor in the 1880s
- John Milne, inventor of the horizontal pendulum seismograph, retired from the Japanese Imperial College of Engineering in Shide, Isle of Wight
- David Niven, actor, lived in Bembridge as a child
- Isaac Pitman, invented a shorthand system, lived for a time in Sandown
- J.B. Priestley, author, playwright and broadcaster, lived at Brook for over a decade from 1948
- John Morgan Richards, cigarette and patent medicine entrepreneur, lived in Steephill, 1903–1918
- Legh Richmond, preacher and writer of the religious tract The Dairyman's Daughter, curate for Yaverland and Brading
- Frederick Riddle, viola player, died in Newport
- John Edward Bernard Seely, 1st Baron Mottistone, Secretary of State for War in the years leading up to the First World War; MP and Justice of the Peace for the Isle of Wight
- Michael Sheard, actor, lived in Ryde
- Algernon Charles Swinburne, poet, lived in Bonchurch
- Shaw Taylor, television presenter, known for the catchphrase "keep 'em peeled", lived in Totland
- Alfred, Lord Tennyson, poet, lived in Farringford in Freshwater Bay
- Former Prime Minister Margaret Thatcher, rented a house in Seaview
- Edward Upward, long-lived author and part of the Auden Group in the 1930s, lived in Sandown from 1961 to 2004
- Queen Victoria, had one of her residences at Osborne House in East Cowes
- Barnes Wallis, inventor of the bouncing bomb, lived and worked in Cowes
- Douglas Webb, DFM air gunner with 617 Squadron on the Dambusters raid; partner of the infamous nude model Pamela Green; lived in Yarmouth

== Currently resident ==
- Raymond Allen, television scriptwriter best known for Some Mothers Do 'Ave 'Em, born and lives in Ryde
- Keegan Brown, professional darts player
- Patrick Buckland, CEO of Stainless Games, creator of Carmageddon
- Hester Chambers, founding member of Wet Leg
- Sarah Close, singer-songwriter and YouTuber, born and lives on the island
- Melvyn Hayes, actor, lives in Ryde
- David Icke, conspiracy theorist, lives in Ryde
- Mark King, Level 42 musician
- Dame Ellen MacArthur, sailor, based in Cowes
- The Osbourne family have a holiday home in Yaverland
- Dick Taylor, founding member of The Rolling Stones and The Pretty Things
- Rhian Teasdale, founding member of Wet Leg
- Alan Titchmarsh, author and TV presenter
- M J Trow, author and teacher
