= Elizabeth Seymour, Lady Cromwell =

English noblewoman

Elizabeth Seymour
- Countess of Wiltshire; Baroness Cromwell; Baroness St. John
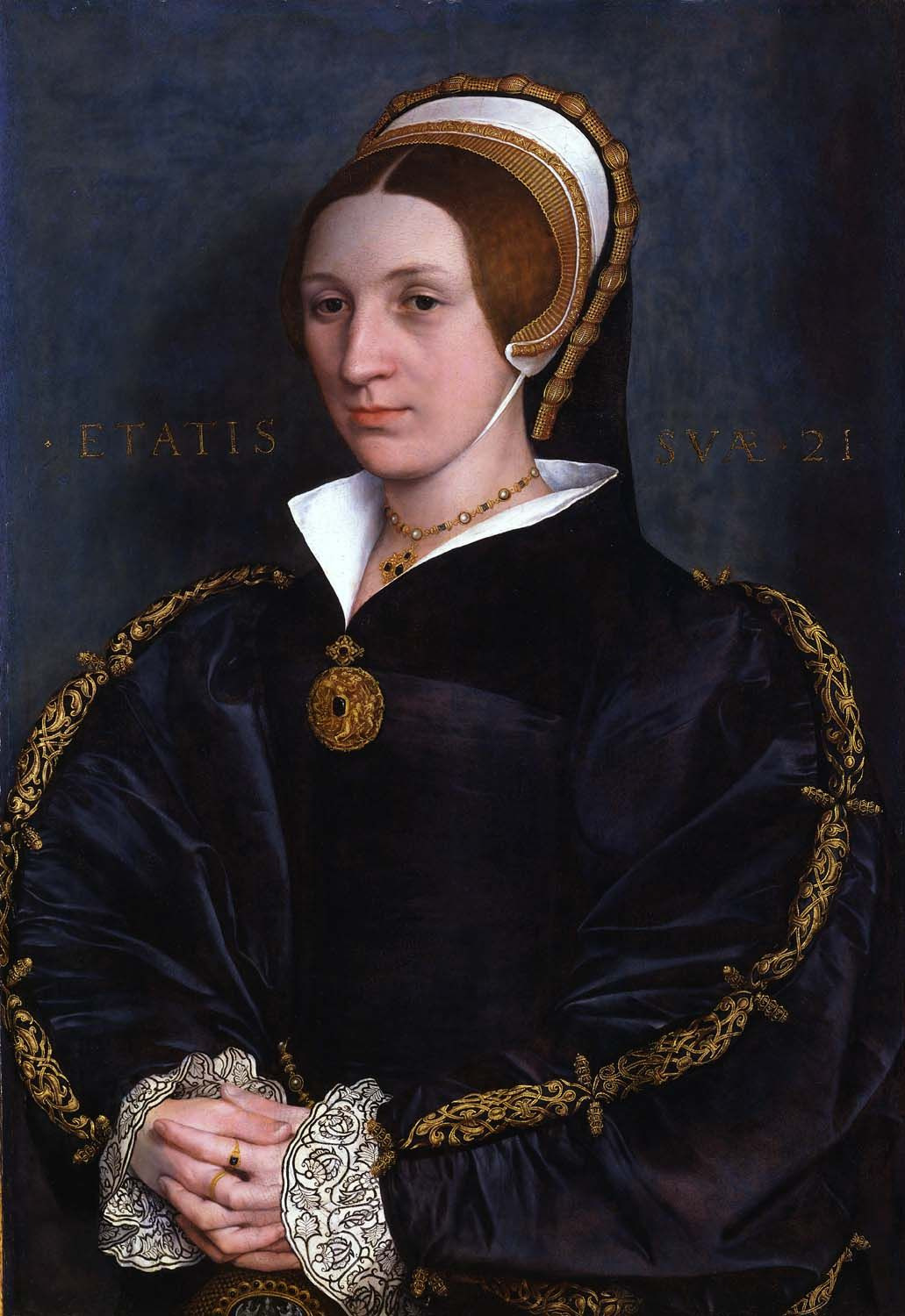
- Portrait of a Lady, probably a Member of the Cromwell Family, perhaps Elizabeth Seymour, c. 1535–1540, Hans Holbein the Younger
- Born: c. 1518
- Died: 19 March 1568 (aged 49–50)
- Buried: St. Mary's Church, Basing, Hampshire; 51.271389°N 1.046667°W
- Spouses: Sir Anthony Ughtred (m. 1530; died 1534) Gregory Cromwell, 1st Baron Cromwell (m. 1537; died 1551) John Paulet, 2nd Marquess of Winchester (m. 1554)
- Issue: Sir Henry Ughtred; Margery Ughtred; Henry Cromwell, 2nd Baron Cromwell; Edward Cromwell; Thomas Cromwell; Katherine Cromwell; Frances Cromwell
- Father: Sir John Seymour
- Mother: Margery Wentworth

Elizabeth Seymour (c. 1518 – 19 March 1568) was a younger daughter of Sir John Seymour of Wulfhall, Wiltshire and Margery Wentworth. Elizabeth and her sister Jane served in the household of Anne Boleyn, the second wife of Henry VIII. The Seymours rose to prominence after the king's attention turned to Jane. In May 1536, Anne Boleyn was accused of treason and adultery, and subsequently executed. On 30 May 1536, eleven days after Anne's execution, Henry VIII and Jane were married. Elizabeth was not included in her sister's household during her brief reign, although she would serve two of Henry VIII's later wives, Anne of Cleves and Catherine Howard. Jane died 24 October 1537, twelve days after giving birth to a healthy son, Edward VI.

Elizabeth lived under four Tudor monarchs (Lady Jane Grey is not included) and was married three times. By July 1530 she had married Sir Anthony Ughtred, Governor of Jersey, who died in 1534. She then married Gregory Cromwell, 1st Baron Cromwell, the son of Thomas Cromwell, chief minister to Henry VIII in 1537; Gregory died in 1551. She married her third and last husband, Sir John Paulet, later Lord St. John, the son of William Paulet, 1st Marquess of Winchester in 1554.

== Seymour family ==
The Seymour family took its name from St. Maur-sur-Loire in Touraine. William de St. Maur in 1240 held the manors of Penhow and Woundy (now called Undy in Monmouthshire). William's great-grandson, Sir Roger de St. Maur, had two sons: John, whose granddaughter conveyed these manors by marriage into the family of Bowlay of Penhow, who bore the Seymour arms; and Sir Roger (c. 1308 – Bef. 1366), who married Cicely, eldest sister and heir of John de Beauchamp, 3rd Baron Beauchamp. Cicely brought to the Seymours the manor of Hache, Somerset, and her grandson, Roger Seymour, by his marriage with Maud, daughter and heir of Sir William Esturmy, acquired Wolf Hall in Wiltshire. Elizabeth's father, Sir John Seymour, was a great-great-grandson of this Roger Seymour.

Sir John Seymour was born in 1474. He succeeded his father in 1492, was knighted by Henry VII for his services against the Cornish rebels at Blackheath in 1497, and was sheriff of Wiltshire in 1508. He was present at the sieges of Thérouanne and Tournay in 1513, at the two interviews between Henry VIII and Francis I in 1520 and 1532, and died on 21 December 1536.

He married Margery, the daughter of Sir Henry Wentworth of Nettlestead, Suffolk, and his wife Anne Say. Anne was the daughter of Sir John Say and his wife, Elizabeth, daughter of Lawrence Cheney (or Cheyne) (c. 1396 – 1461) and Elizabeth Cokayne. Margery Wentworth's grandfather, Sir Philip Wentworth, had married Mary, daughter of John Clifford, 7th Baron de Clifford, whose mother Elizabeth was daughter of Henry Percy (Hotspur) and great-great-granddaughter of Edward III.

Sir John Seymour (1474 – 21 December 1536), of Wulfhall, Savernake, Wiltshire, and Margery Wentworth (c. 1478 – c. October 1550) were married 22 October 1494. The couple had ten children:

- John Seymour (died 15 July 1510)
- Edward Seymour, 1st Duke of Somerset, Lord Protector of Edward VI (c. 1500/1506 – 22 January 1552) married firstly Catherine, daughter of Sir William Fillol, and secondly Anne, daughter of Sir Edward Stanhope.
- Sir Henry Seymour (1503 – 1578) married Barbara, daughter of Morgan Wolfe
- Thomas Seymour, 1st Baron Seymour of Sudeley (c. 1508 – 20 March 1549) married Catherine Parr, widow of Henry VIII
- John Seymour (died young)
- Anthony Seymour (died c. 1528)
- Jane Seymour, queen Consort of Henry VIII (c. 1509 – 24 October 1537)
- Margery Seymour (died c. 1528)
- Elizabeth Seymour (c. 1518 – 19 Mar 1568)
- Dorothy Seymour (c. 1519 – 4 January 1574) married firstly, Sir Clement Smith (c. 1515 – 26 August 1552) of Little Baddow, Essex and secondly, Thomas Leventhorpe of Shingle Hall, Hertfordshire.
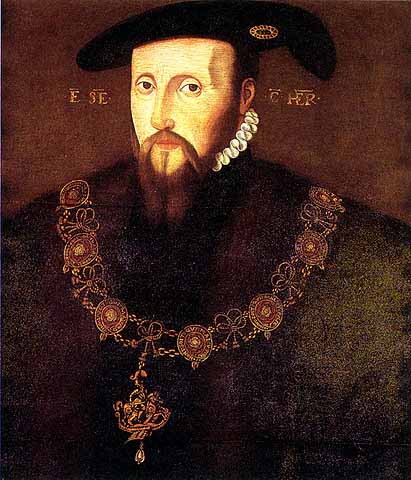
Edward Seymour, 1st Duke of Somerset

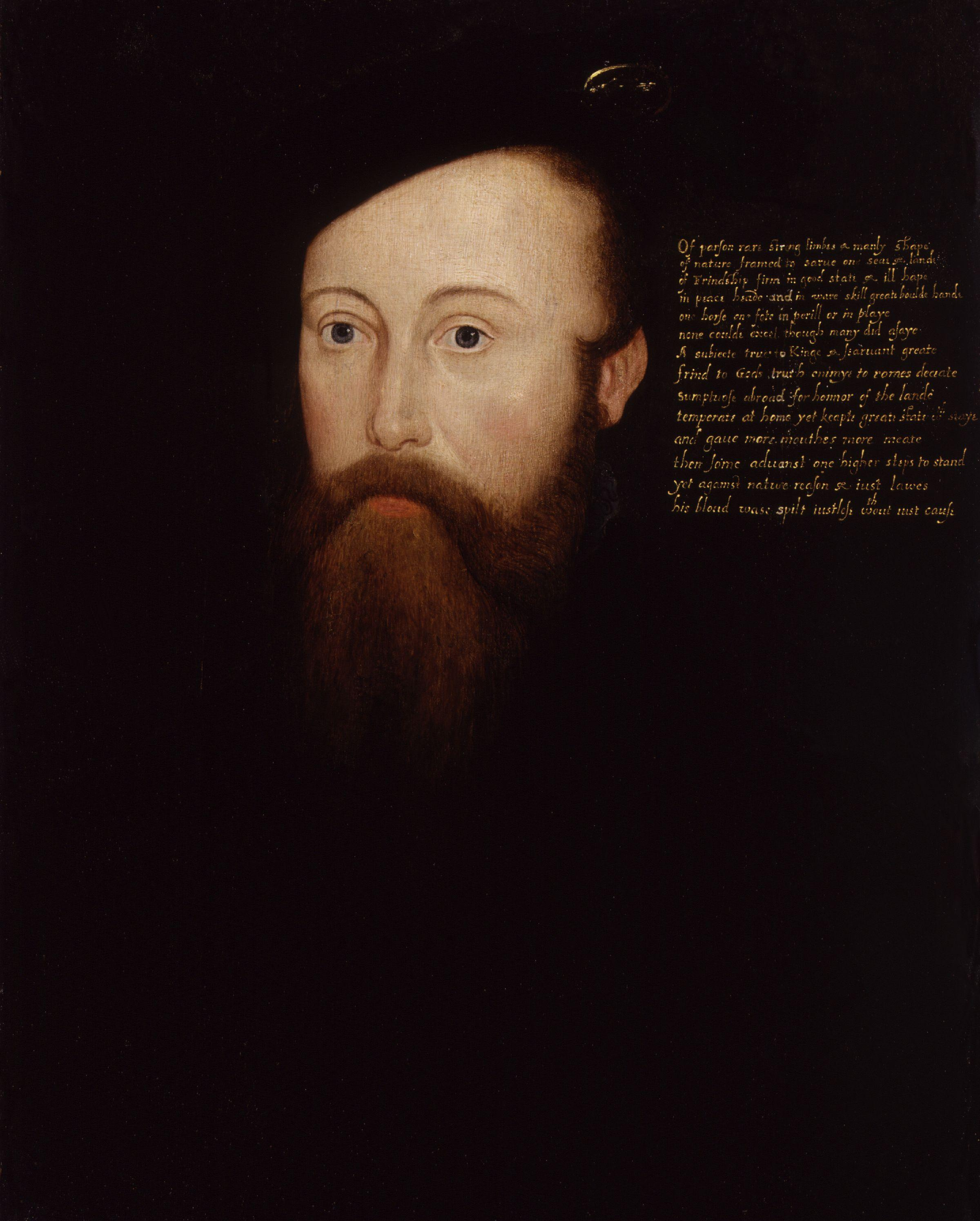
Thomas Seymour, Baron Seymour

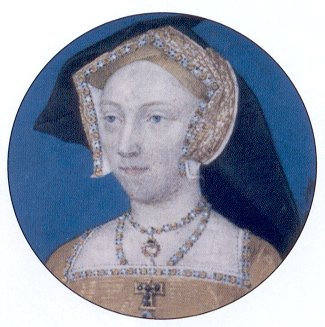
Jane Seymour, portrait miniature c. 1536–37, Lucas Horenbout

Of the ten children born at Wulfhall, six survived:– three sons: Edward, Henry and Thomas, and three daughters: Jane, Elizabeth and Dorothy. Edward, Thomas, Jane and Elizabeth were courtiers. Edward and Thomas were both executed during the reign of Edward VI. Henry Seymour, who did not share his brothers' ambition, escaped their fate.

== Early life ==
Elizabeth Seymour was born about 1518, probably at Wulfhall. Historian Elizabeth Norton in Jane Seymour: Patronage, Material Culture and Image Crafting (2026) argues that Elizabeth was the eldest daughter of Sir John Seymour and Margery Wentworth, born about 1510, and consequently around ten years older than her second husband, Gregory Cromwell. Norton claims that ″Margery Wentworth named her four daughters after herself and her three sisters.″ The eldest of Margery's sisters was Elizabeth Wentworth, who was still living in 1542. However, two other women also shared the name: Sir John Seymour’s mother, Elizabeth Darrell {d. 29 July 1537), who lived with the family at Wolfhall, and ″Margery’s high-profile stepmother″, Elizabeth, Lady Scrope, who died on 7 September 1517.

Her letters to Thomas Cromwell and Henry VIII show that she was both intelligent and astute. She was also skilled in needlework. She played a brief but prominent role in the 1530s and 1540s, during the rise to power of her father-in-law, Thomas Cromwell, and her brother, Edward. Elizabeth and her sister, Jane, served in the household of Henry VIII's second wife, Anne Boleyn, their second cousin. She married three times and by her first two marriages had seven children. She is best known as the wife of Gregory Cromwell.

== First marriage ==
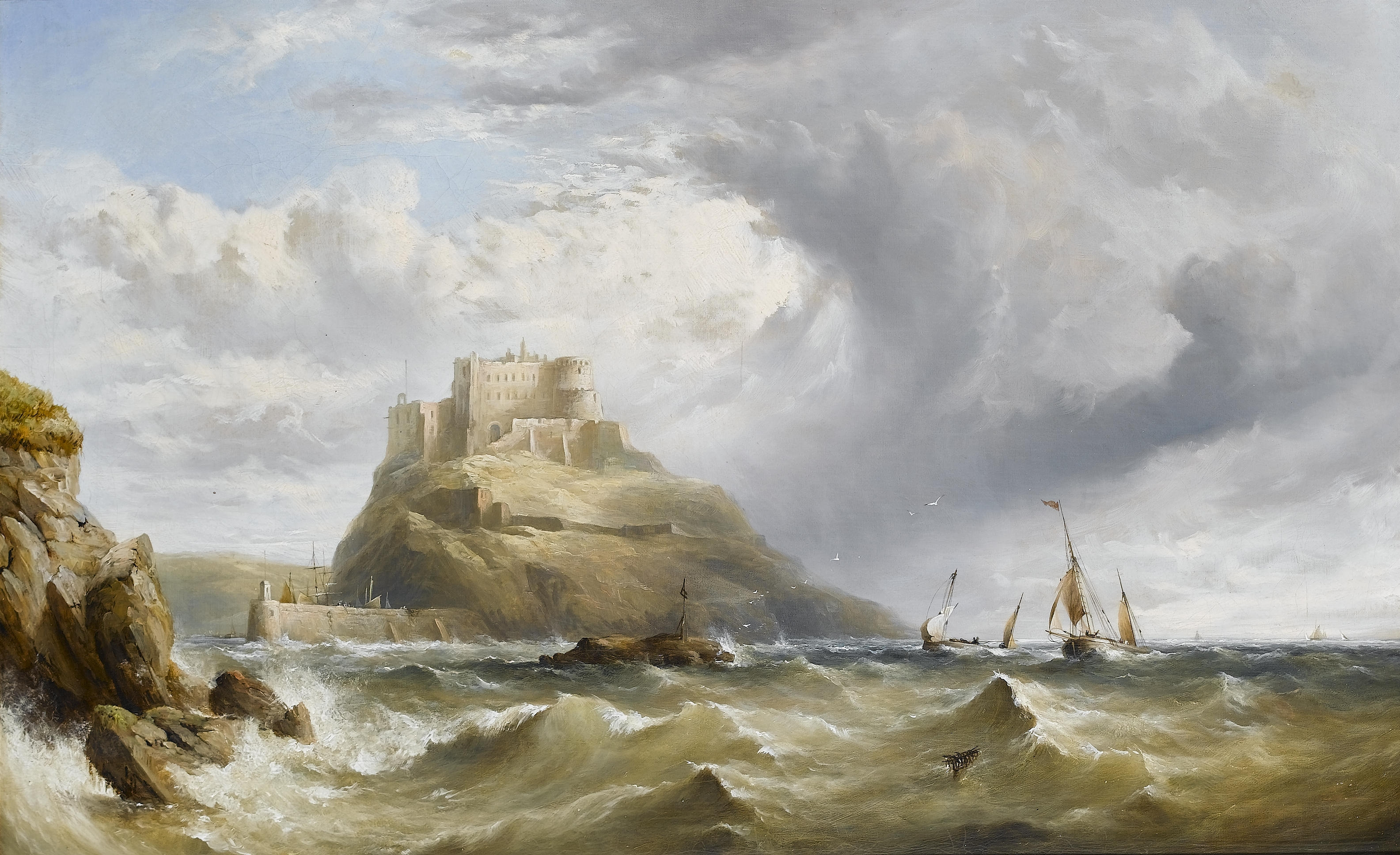
Mont Orgueil Castle, Jersey

By July 1530 Elizabeth had married, as his second wife, Sir Anthony Ughtred, of Kexby, Yorkshire.

The couple had two children:

- Sir Henry Ughtred, (c. 1533/4 – 1599), born at Mont Orgueil, Jersey, married Elizabeth, daughter to John Paulet, Lord St. John and his first wife Elizabeth Willoughby and the widow of Sir William Courtenay. After his wife's death in 1576 he appears to have taken a second wife.
- Margery Ughtred, (c. 1535 –?) married William Hungate of Burnby, Yorkshire. They had two sons, William and Leonard.

In January 1531, Henry VIII granted the couple the manors of Lepington and Kexby (Yorkshire), previously held by Cardinal Thomas Wolsey. She was well-placed at court, in the service of Anne Boleyn, to support her husband's interests. In August 1532, when the pro-Boleyn Sir Anthony Ughtred was appointed captain and Governor of Jersey, it was almost certainly due to the influence of Anne Boleyn. He served in person, and remained in the post until his death.

On Saturday, 31 May 1533, Lady Ughtred was one of the ladies and gentlewomen attendant on horseback who accompanied Queen Anne Boleyn in a procession from the Tower of London to Westminster Hall.

Sir Anthony Ughtred died 6 October 1534 in Jersey, and was buried in the chapel of St George, in the castle of Mont Orgueil. After her husband's death, the young widow returned to England, to serve her mistress and cousin, the queen. Her daughter, Margery was probably born in Kexby, Yorkshire in the same year. Her one-year-old son, Henry, remained on the island for a time, in the care of Helier de Carteret, Bailiff of Jersey.

== The Queen's sister ==
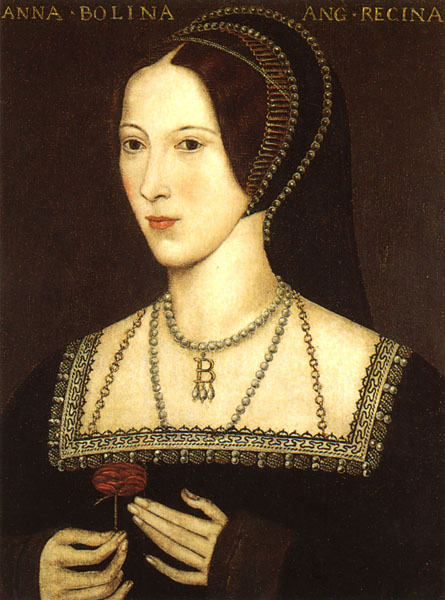
Anne Boleyn, portrait at Hever Castle

When Anne Boleyn failed to produce a male heir after almost three years of marriage, the able and ambitious Edward Seymour and his family, gained wealth and power as Jane supplanted Anne in the king's affections. In March 1536, Edward was made a gentleman of the privy chamber, and a few days later, he and his wife Anne together with his sister Jane, were lodged at the palace at Greenwich in apartments which the king could reach through a private passage.

In May 1536, accused of treason, incest and plotting the king's death, Anne was imprisoned in the Tower, awaiting her trial. Jane Seymour resided with members of her family, first at the home of Sir Nicholas Carew in Surrey and then moved closer to the king, to a house at Chelsea, formerly owned by Thomas More. While the king's second wife prepared for her execution, Jane was planning her wedding, "splendidly served by the King's cook and other officers" and "most richly dressed". On 30 May 1536, eleven days after Anne Boleyn's execution, Henry VIII and Jane were married. On 5 June, a week after his sister's marriage to the king, Edward Seymour was created Viscount Beauchamp. Two days later he received a grant of numerous manors in Wiltshire, including Ambresbury, Easton Priory, Chippenham, and Maiden Bradley. On 7 July he was made governor and captain of Jersey, and in August, chancellor of North Wales. He had livery of his father's lands in the following year, was on 30 January granted the manor of Muchelney, Somerset, and on 22 May sworn of the privy council. In the same month he was on the commission appointed to try Lords Darcy and Hussey for their role in the Pilgrimage of Grace. On 15 October he carried Princess Elizabeth at Edward VI's christening, and 18 October was created Earl of Hertford. Thomas Seymour was also made a gentleman of the privy chamber in 1536, and knighted 18 October of the same year. He was made captain of the Sweepstake in 1537.

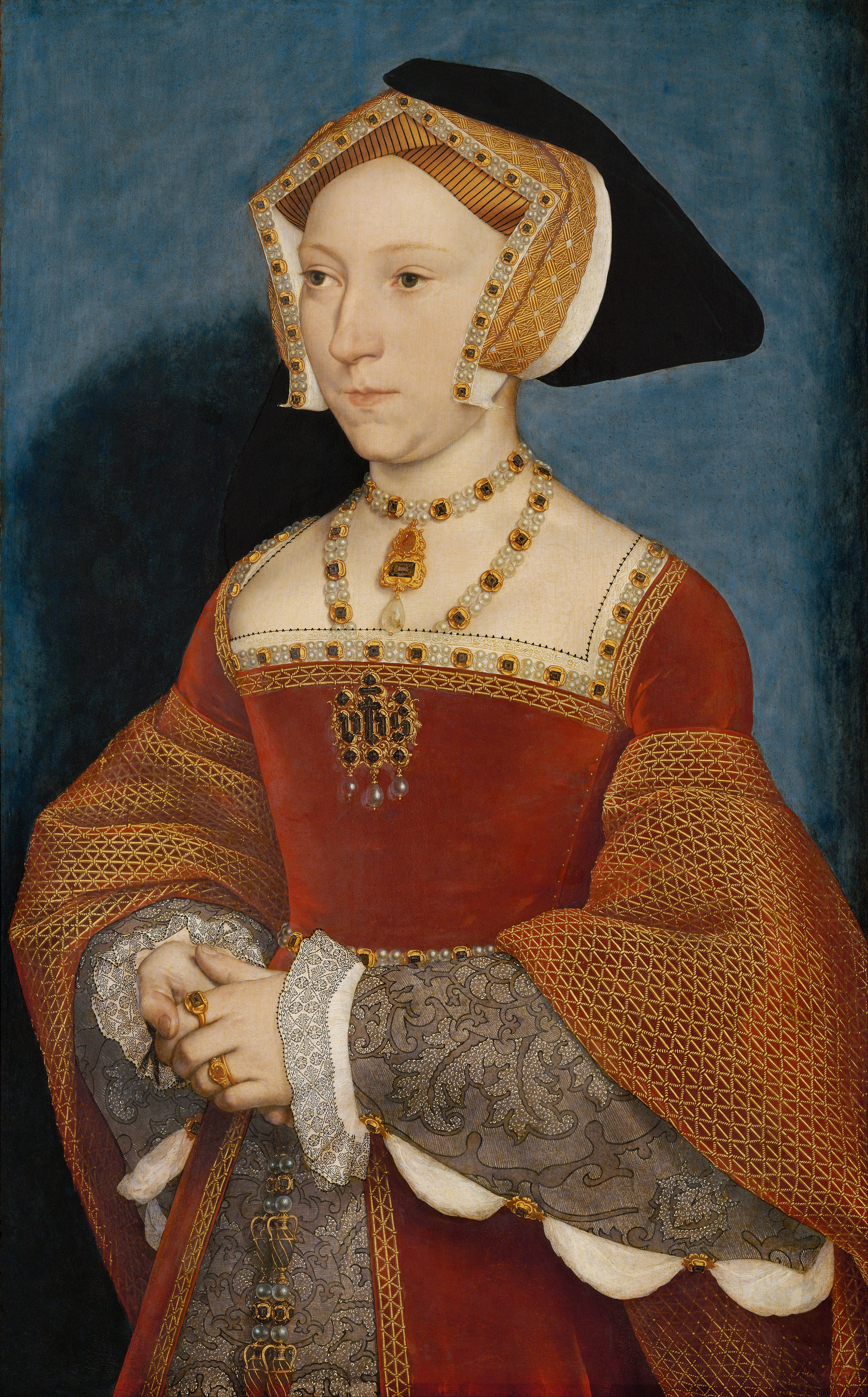
Jane Seymour, Queen of England, Hans Holbein the Younger

When Henry VIII sought to divorce his first wife, Catherine of Aragon and marry Anne Boleyn, Jane, who had previously served in Catherine's household, had remained loyal to her and her daughter, Mary. Elizabeth and her first husband, Sir Anthony Ughtred had supported Anne Boleyn and benefited from her rise. It is not surprising therefore, that she was not included in the new queen's household. There is no evidence that Elizabeth benefited directly from her sister's royal status, before the news of a royal pregnancy became public knowledge in 1537. The impending birth of an heir to the throne would dramatically increase her value as a potential bride.

On 18 March 1537, then a young widow of reduced means, residing in York, Elizabeth had written to Thomas Cromwell, then Baron Cromwell, who had previously offered to help her, if she was ever in need. She had hoped to "be holpen to obtain of the king's grace to be farmer of one of these abbeys if they fortune to go down ..." Cromwell, probably encouraged by Edward Seymour, proposed instead that she marry his only son and heir, Gregory. By June, it appears that Cromwell's offer had been accepted. Arthur Darcy, the son of Thomas Darcy, 1st Baron Darcy de Darcy, assured her that "I would have been glad to have had you likewise, but sure it is, as I said, that some southern lord shall make you forget the North."

== Second marriage ==
which doth comfort me most in the world, that I find your lordship is contented with me, and that you will be my good lord and father the which, I trust, never to deserve other, but rather to give cause for the continuance of the same.

— Elizabeth Cromwell, letter to her father-in-law, Thomas Cromwell, 1537

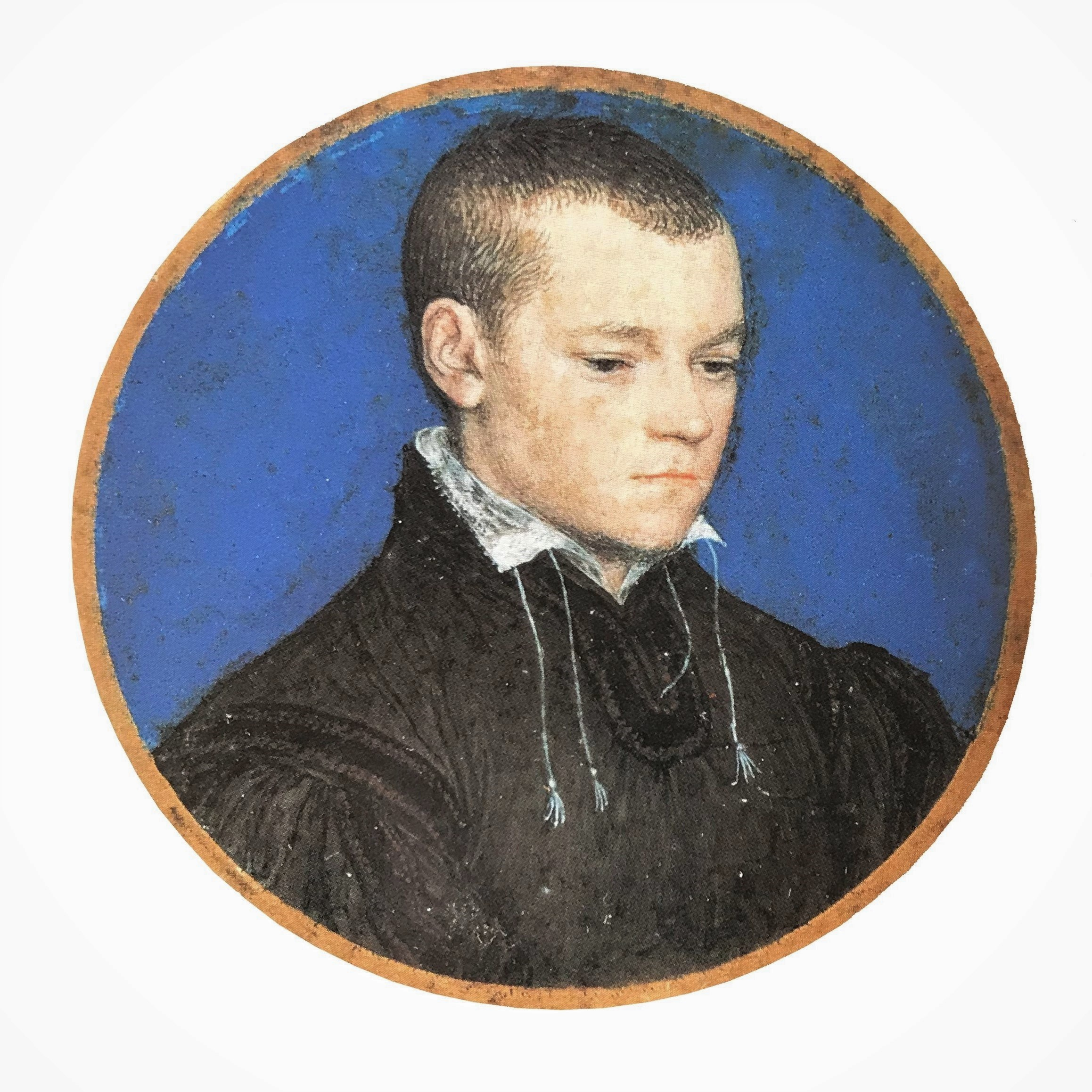
Possibly Gregory Cromwell, circa 1535–1540, Hans Holbein the Younger

On 3 August 1537, Elizabeth married Gregory Cromwell at Mortlake. Edward Seymour, then Viscount Beauchamp wrote to Cromwell on 2 September 1537, to know how he has fared since the writer's departure. Wishes Cromwell were with him, when he should have had the best sport with bow, hounds, and hawks and sends commendations to his brother-in-law and sister, adding: "and I pray God to send me by them shortly a nephew."

The couple had five children:

- Henry Cromwell, 2nd Baron Cromwell, (before 1 March 1538 – 16 December 1592), married Mary, (died 1592), the daughter of John Paulet, Lord St. John and his first wife Elizabeth Willoughby.
- Edward Cromwell, (1539 – ?) died young
- Thomas Cromwell, (c. 1540 – died between February 1610 and April 1611), married 18 August 1580, Katherine (died before 1 August 1616), daughter of Thomas Gardner of Coxford.
- Katherine Cromwell, (c. 1541 – ?), probably named after Queen Catherine Howard, married John Strode of Parnham, Dorset
- Frances Cromwell, (c. 1544 – 7 February 1562), married Richard Strode of Newnham, Devon.

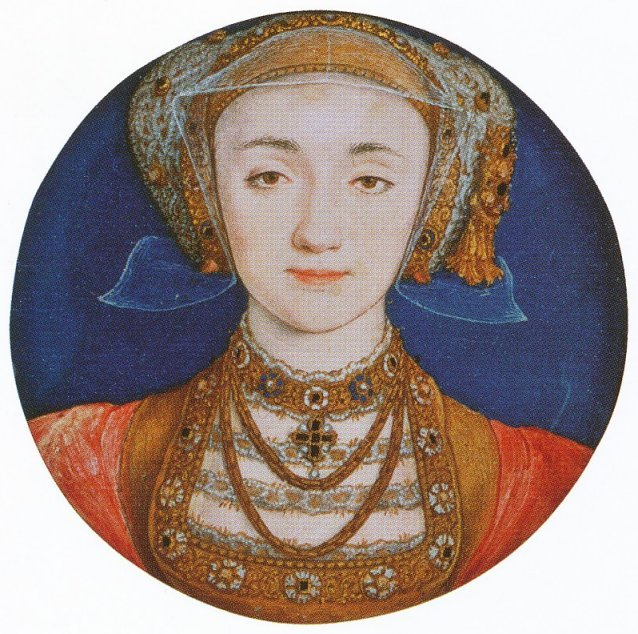
Portrait Miniature of Anne of Cleves, Hans Holbein the Younger

On 12 November, three months after their wedding, Elizabeth and Gregory took part in the queen's funeral procession. Jane's death on 24 October, after being delivered of the king's longed-for son, naturally came as a blow to the Seymour family. It proved to be a setback to Edward Seymour's influence. He was described in the following year as "young and wise," but "of small power". The death of the queen would have disastrous consequences for Thomas Cromwell.

The couple's first child, Henry was born in 1538, shortly before their arrival at Lewes Priory in Sussex, recently acquired by Thomas Cromwell, where they resided until early 1539. Another son, Edward, followed in 1539, who may have been born, at Leeds Castle in Kent.

Gregory Cromwell appears to have been devoted to his wife and children. In December 1539, while in Calais waiting to welcome Henry VIII's new bride, Anne of Cleves, he wrote to his wife at Leeds Castle, addressing her as his "loving bedfellow", describing the arrival of Anne of Cleves, and requesting news "as well of yourself as also my little boys, of whose increase and towardness be you assured I am not a little desirous to be advertised". In January 1540, Elizabeth was appointed to the household of the new Queen, Anne of Cleves.

Thomas Cromwell was created Earl of Essex on 17 April, and his son, Gregory assumed the courtesy title of Lord Cromwell In May, Lady Cromwell watched her husband compete in the May Day jousts at the Palace of Westminster and afterwards feasted with the queen and her ladies. Anne of Cleves would not remain as queen for long, however, as the mercurial Henry VIII wanted a divorce.

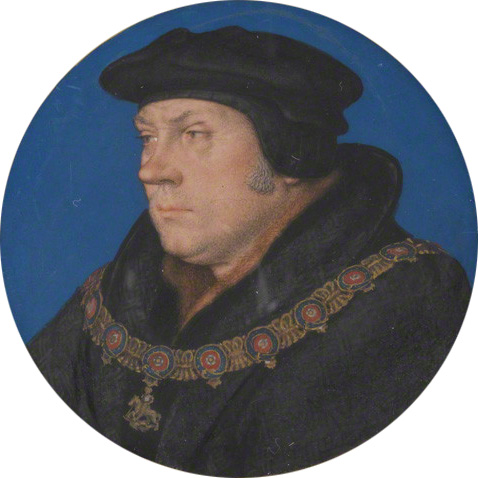
Portrait of Thomas Cromwell, wearing the Garter collar (c. 1485-1540)

Thomas Cromwell was at the height of his ascendancy, however his political enemies were gaining ground and his time in power would soon come to an end. He was arrested at a council meeting at 3.00 p.m. on the afternoon of 10 June 1540, accused of treason and heresy, taken to the Tower and his possessions seized. He was condemned without a trial and his sentence was later confirmed by an act of attainder. There are no surviving records of Gregory and Elizabeth's whereabouts at this time.

Thomas Cromwell wrote a desperate letter from the tower to the king to plead his innocence and appealed to him to be merciful to his son and the rest of his family.

Sir, upon [my kne]es I most humbly beseech your most gracious Majesty [to be goo]d and gracious lord to my poor son, the good and virtu[ous lady his] wife, and their poor children

Elizabeth also wrote to Henry VIII, to assure him of her loyalty and that of her husband:

After the bounden duty of my most humble submission unto your excellent majesty, whereas it hath pleased the same, of your mere mercy and infinite goodness, notwithstanding the heinous trespasses and most grievous offences of my father-in-law, yet so graciously to extend your benign pity towards my poor husband and me, as the extreme indigence and poverty wherewith my said father-in-law's most detestable offences hath oppressed us, is thereby right much holpen and relieved, like as I have of long time been right desirous presently as well to render most humble thanks, as also to desire continuance of the same your highness' most benign goodness. So, considering your grace's most high and weighty affairs at this present, fear of molesting or being troublesome unto your highness hath disuaded me as yet otherwise to sue unto your grace than alonely by these my most humble letters, until your grace's said affairs shall be partly overpast. Most humbly beseeching your majesty in the mean season mercifully to accept this my most obedient suit, and to extend your accustomed pity and gracious goodness towards my said poor husband and me, who never hath, nor, God willing, never shall offend your majesty, but continually pray for the prosperous estate of the same long time to remain and continue."

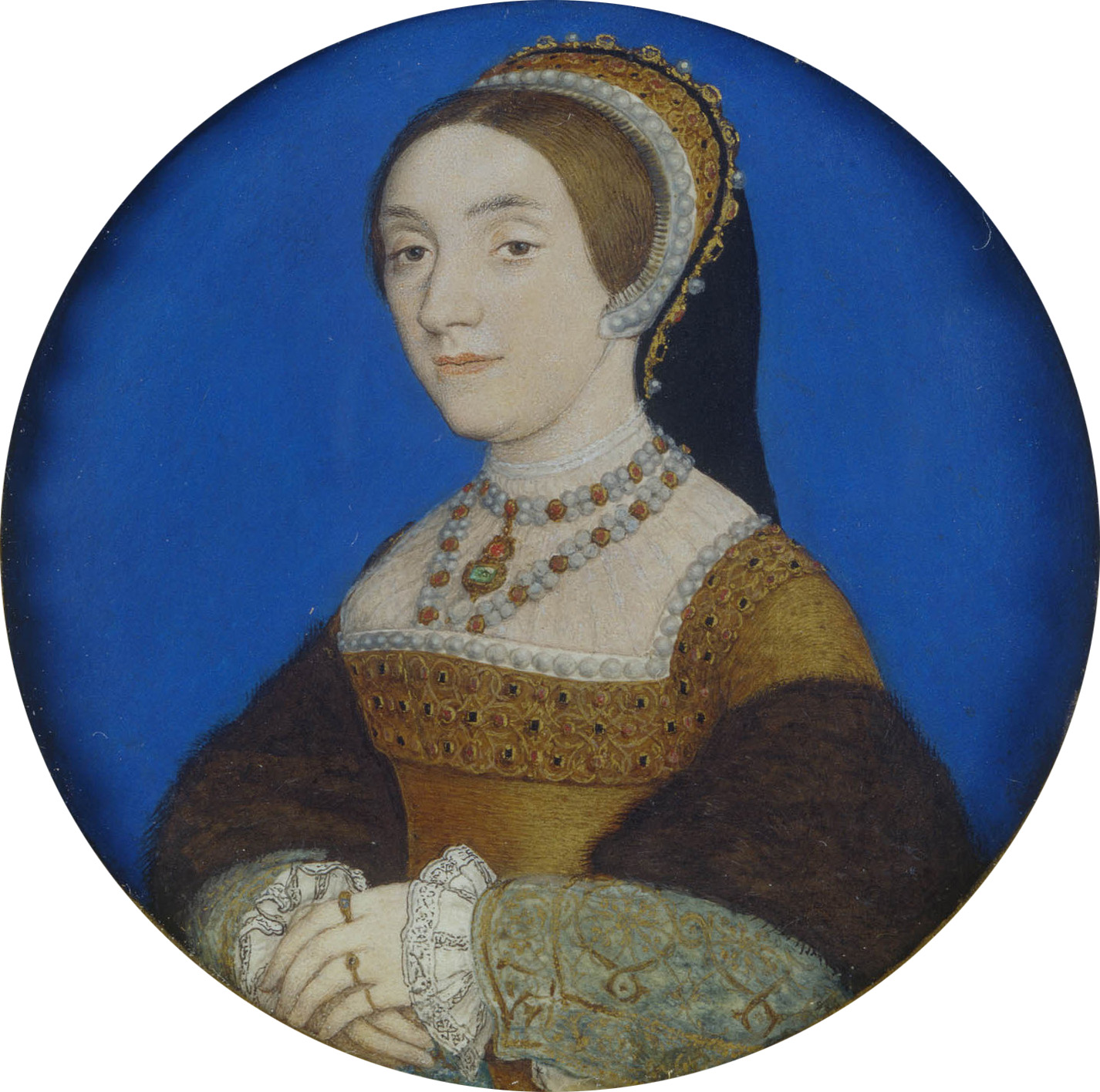
Catherine Howard, miniature by Hans Holbein the Younger

This undated letter is placed at the end of July 1540 in Letters and Papers of the Reign of Henry VIII. It was probably written while Thomas Cromwell was imprisoned in the Tower, as Elizabeth refers to her father-in-law, and not her late father-in-law. Moreover, it was customary at that time to write "may his soul God pardon" or something similar when referring to someone who had recently died, which she did not do. The letter was almost certainly written on the advice of her brother, Edward.

Thomas Cromwell was beheaded on Tower Hill on 28 July 1540, the same day as the king's marriage to Catherine Howard. He was buried in an unmarked grave in the Chapel of St. Peter ad Vincula in the Tower. It is unknown if Gregory and his family were present at his execution or burial.

Gregory and Elizabeth were not implicated, although it would be almost six months before their desperate situation was to be resolved. They had been dependants of Thomas Cromwell, with no home and little income of their own, and would have had to rely on the generosity of family and friends. The king was inclined to be generous and Elizabeth was included in the future queen Catherine Howard's household as one of her attendant ladies.

On 18 December 1540, less than five months after his father's execution, Gregory Cromwell was created Baron Cromwell by letters patent, and summoned to Parliament as a peer of the realm. This title was a new creation, rather than a restoration of his father's forfeited barony. The following February he received a royal grant of lands that had been owned by his late father.

At the coronation of King Edward VI, on 20 February 1547, Elizabeth's husband and her brother, Henry were invested as Knights of the Order of the Bath. Her brother, Thomas was found guilty of treason and executed 20 March 1549.

Elizabeth became a widow again upon the death of Gregory Cromwell from sweating sickness in 1551. He died at Launde Abbey 4 July 1551 and was buried three days later in the chapel at Launde. In London, Henry Machyn recorded the events in his diary:

And died my Lord Cromwell in Leicestershire and was buried with a standard, a banner of arms, and coat, helmet, sword, target, and escutcheons and herald.

Gregory lies buried under a magnificent monument in the chapel at Launde. The initials "E C" can be seen in the intricate entablature beneath the pediment.

Edward, Duke of Somerset, who had always been a constant source of support to his sister Elizabeth, went to the block 22 January 1552 and his wife remained in the Tower. Since he had been found guilty of the lesser charge of felony, and not for treason, his lands and dignities were not thereby affected; however an act of Parliament was passed on 12 April 1552 declaring them forfeited and confirming his attainder. In May, his four younger daughters were placed in Elizabeth's care. She was granted 100 marks for the provision and education of each of her nieces per year, as well as the lease of her minor son's house of Launde Abbey, by way of an inducement. However, by October, the arrangement was placing the widow under a considerable strain. On 25 October 1552, she wrote to her friend, Sir William Cecil, of the Privy Council, requesting to be relieved of her troublesome nieces, who did not take her advice "in such good part as my good meaning was, nor according to my expectation in them". Her husband's family were all dead, her own surviving family did not live nearby, and she no longer had the support of her husband or her brother, Edward. She reminded Cecil that she had no near relations who could give her advice. Her pleas fell on deaf ears and her nieces would remain with her until their mother, Anne, Duchess of Somerset, was released from the Tower by Mary I in August 1553.

== Third marriage ==
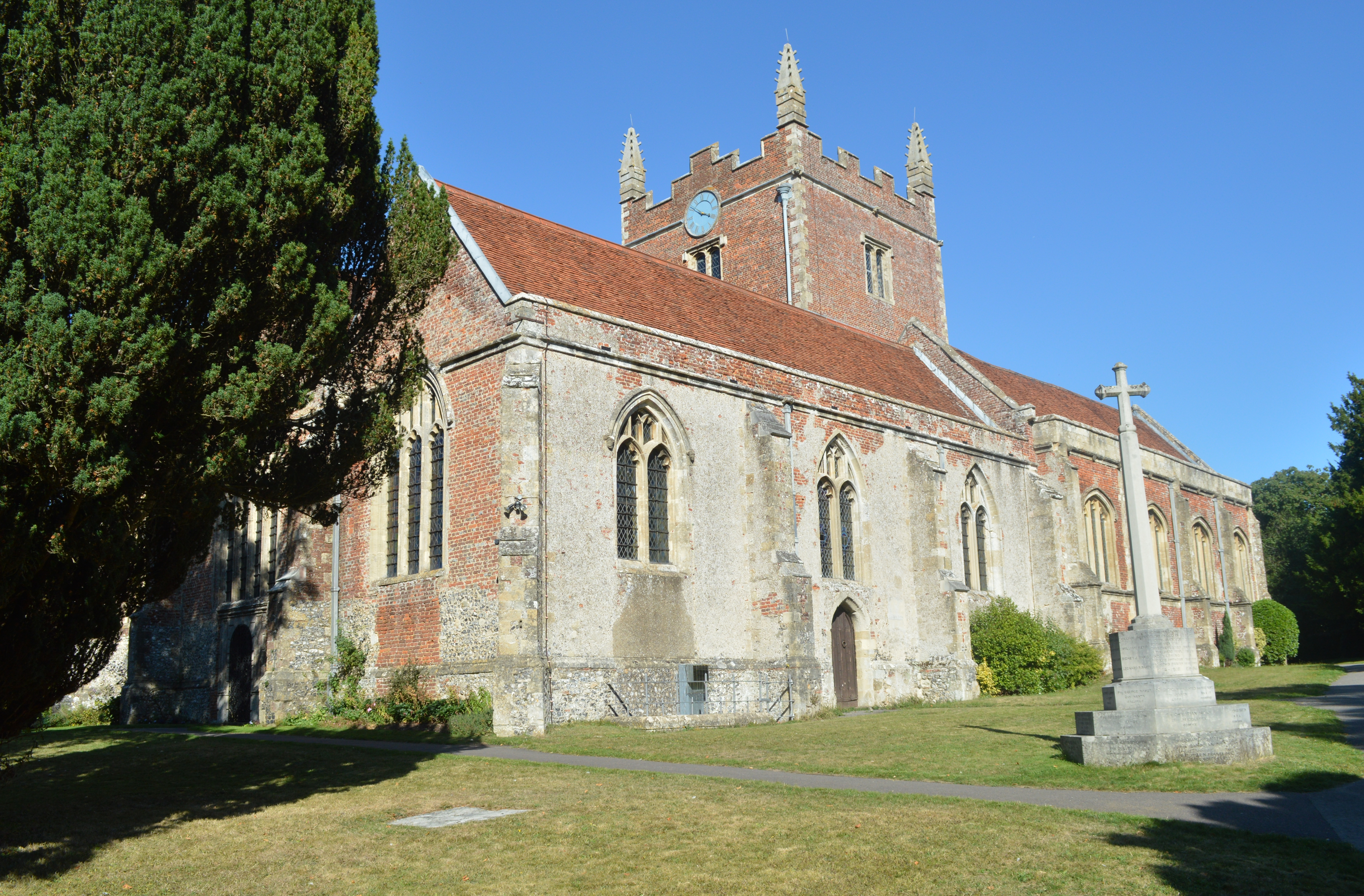
Church of St Mary, Old Basing, Hampshire

Between 10 March and 24 April 1554, Elizabeth married, as his second wife, Sir John Paulet, later Lord St. John, who outlived her. There were no children by this marriage. Elizabeth's two eldest sons married John Paulet's daughters. Henry Ughtred married the widowed Elizabeth after 1557 and Henry Cromwell married Mary sometime before 1560. Details of her later life remain obscure, however she and her husband appear in the records from time to time in matters relating to her son, Henry Cromwell's minority and suits for the continuation of royal grants at the commencement of each new reign.

== Death ==
Elizabeth died 19 March 1568, and was buried on 5 April in St. Mary's Church, Basing, Hampshire. John Paulet, Lord St. John married, before 30 September 1568, Winifred, widow of Sir Richard Sackville, and daughter of John Brydges, a former Lord Mayor of London. He succeeded his father as Marquess of Winchester in 1572.

== Portraits ==
In 1909 British art historian, Sir Lionel Cust, then Director of the National Portrait Gallery in London, identified a portrait by Hans Holbein the Younger that had belonged to the Cromwell family for centuries as a likeness of Queen Catherine Howard. Inscribed ETATIS SVÆ 21, indicating that the sitter was depicted at the age of twenty-one, the portrait has long been associated with Henry VIII's young queen, but the lady is now thought to be a member of the Cromwell family.

The portrait shown on this page, dated circa 1535–1540, is exhibited at the Toledo Museum of Art as Portrait of a Lady, probably a Member of the Cromwell Family. A sixteenth-century version of the portrait, at Hever Castle in Kent, is exhibited as Portrait of a Lady, thought to be Catherine Howard. The National Portrait Gallery exhibits a similar painting, Unknown woman, formerly known as Catherine Howard, dating from the late seventeenth century. This would seem to indicate a sitter who was still a connection to be commemorated over a century later.

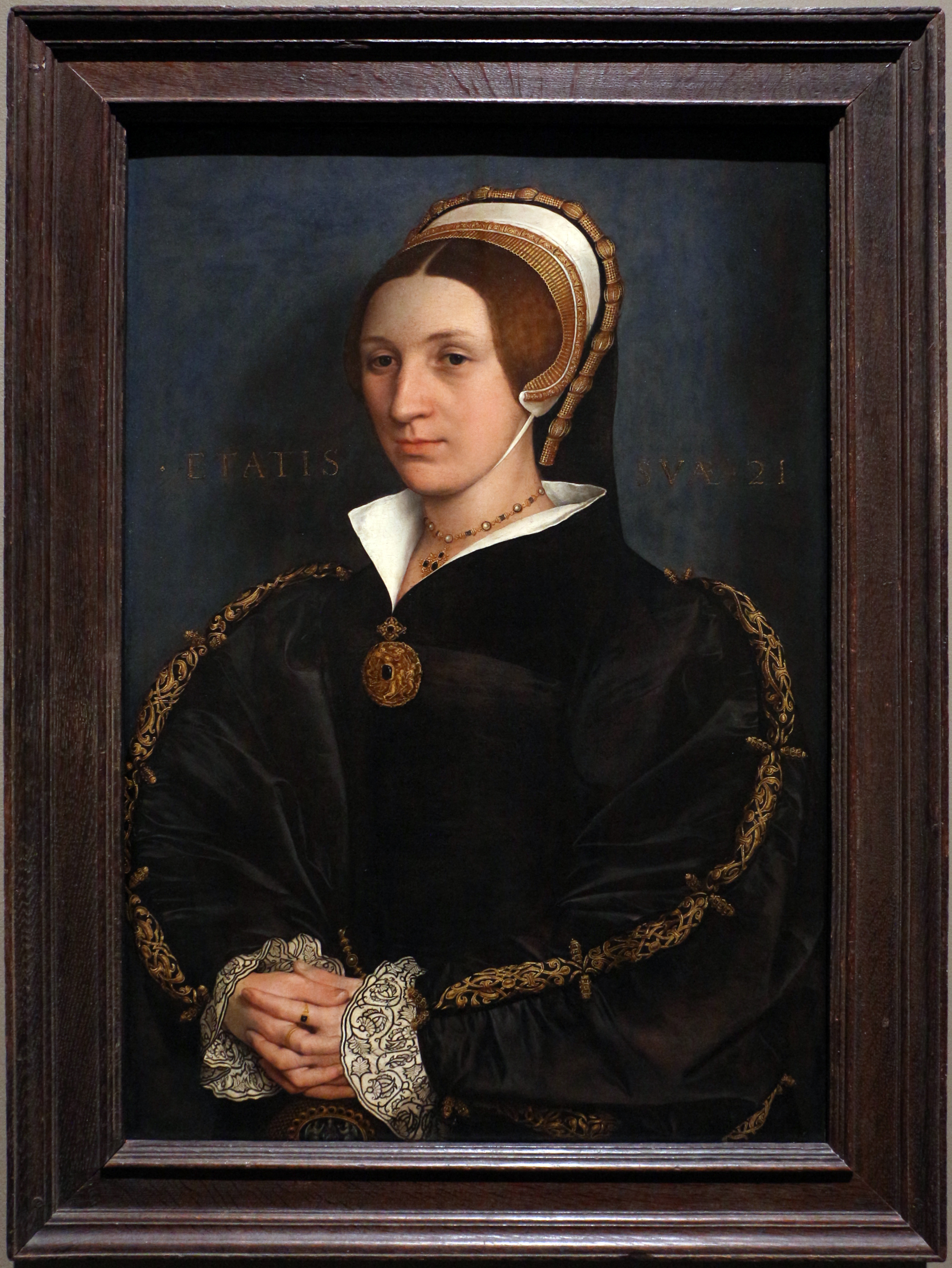
Portrait of a Lady, probably a Member of the Cromwell Family c. 1535–1540
(Toledo Museum of Art)

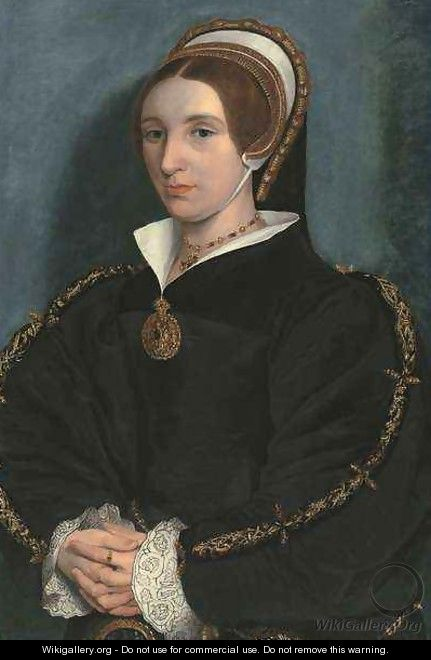
Portrait of a Lady, thought to be Catherine Howard, 16th century, follower of Hans Holbein the Younger (Hever Castle)

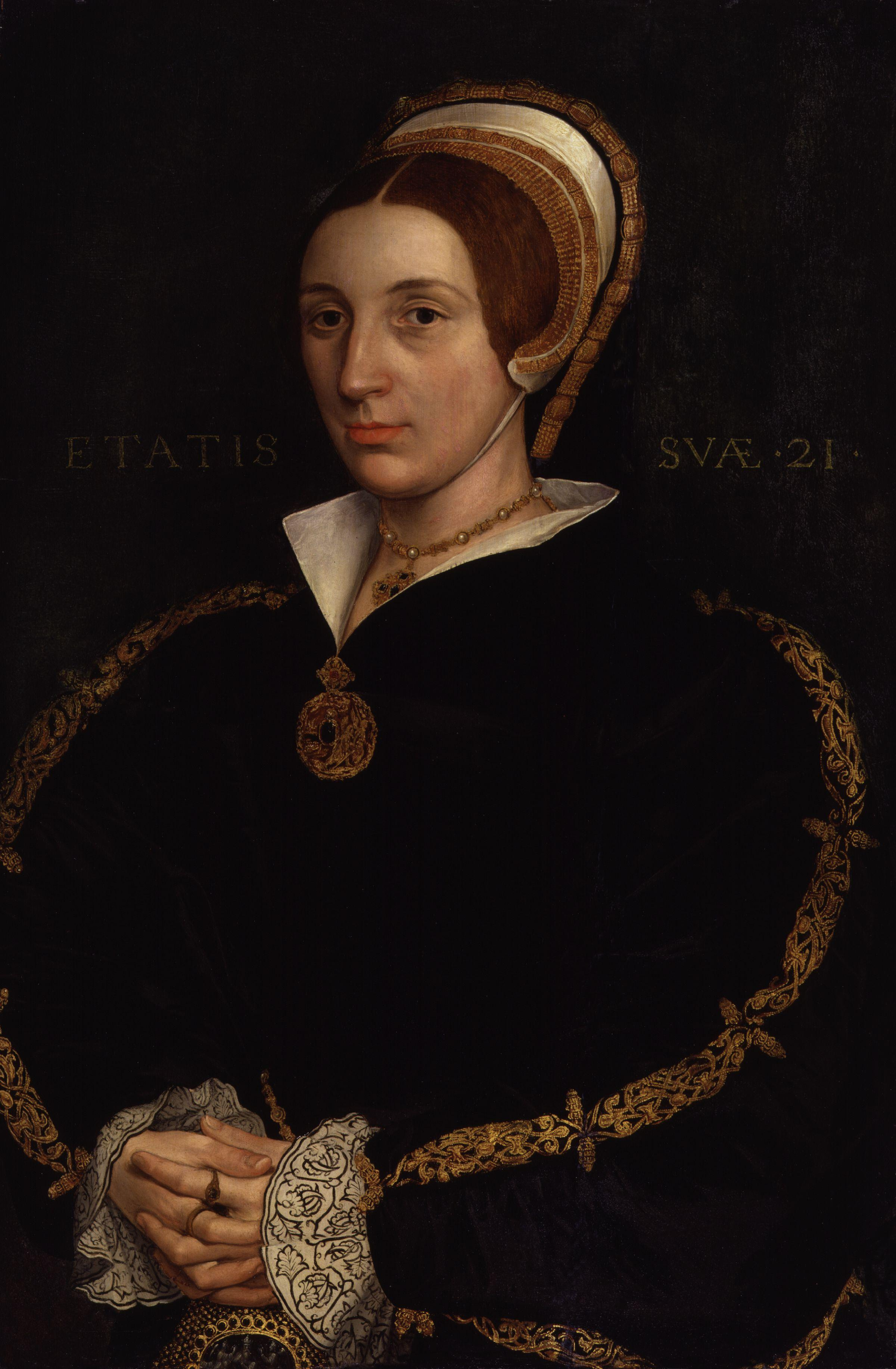
Unknown woman, formerly known as Catherine Howard, late 17th century, after Hans Holbein the Younger (National Portrait Gallery)

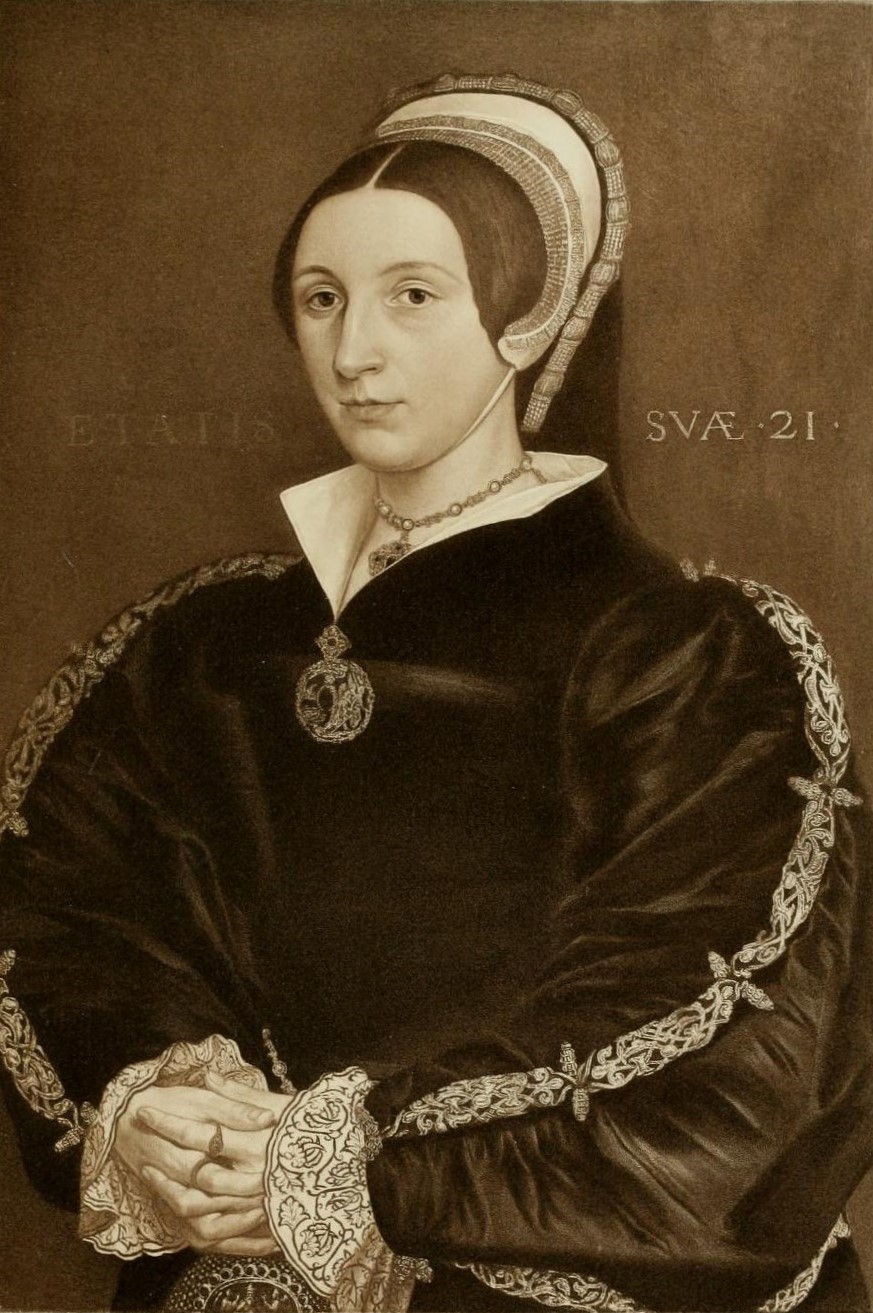
Unknown woman, formerly known as Catherine Howard, 1902, after Hans Holbein the Younger

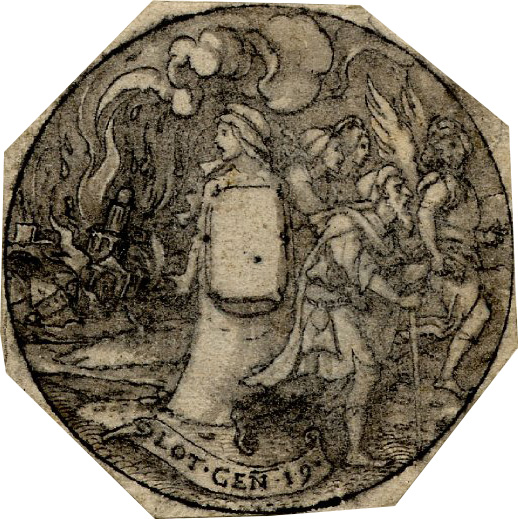
Medallion of Lot with his family, guided by an angel, fleeing from Sodom, by Hans Holbein the Younger (British Museum)

Art historian Sir Roy Strong, following the lead of Charles Kingsley Adams, noted that both the Toledo portrait and the National Portrait Gallery version appear in the context of a series of portraits of members of the family of the Protector's uncle, Sir Oliver Cromwell (c. 1562–1655), and have provenances linking them with the Cromwell family. He argued that the portrait in the Toledo Museum of Art, "should by rights depict a lady of the Cromwell family aged 21 c.1535–40" and suggested that the lady might be Elizabeth Seymour, wife of Gregory Cromwell, 1st Baron Cromwell, son of Thomas Cromwell, Earl of Essex. He stated that a "dated parallel for costume, notably the distinctive cut of the sleeves, is Holbein's Christina of Denmark of 1538." John Rowlands agreed that "the portrait could certainly belong to the period c. 1535-40, but the headdress suggests a date towards its end." Herbert Norris claimed that the sitter is wearing a sleeve which follows a style set by Anne of Cleves, which would date the portrait to after 6 January 1540, when Anne's marriage to Henry VIII took place.

The portrait includes a large circular pendant on the biblical theme of Lot, with his family, fleeing from Sodom. A design by Holbein for this pendant survives in the British Museum. It has been suggested that the six fleurs-de-lis on the lady's left sleeve in the Holbein portrait at the head of the page reflect the Seymour heraldry. An augmentation of honour was granted to Edward Seymour, Viscount Beauchamp, (later Earl of Hertford and Duke of Somerset), following Henry VIII's marriage to Jane Seymour: Or, on a pile gules between six fleurs-de-lys azure three lions of England.

Augmentation of honour granted to the Seymours following Henry VIII's marriage to Jane

Coat of arms of Queen Jane Seymour

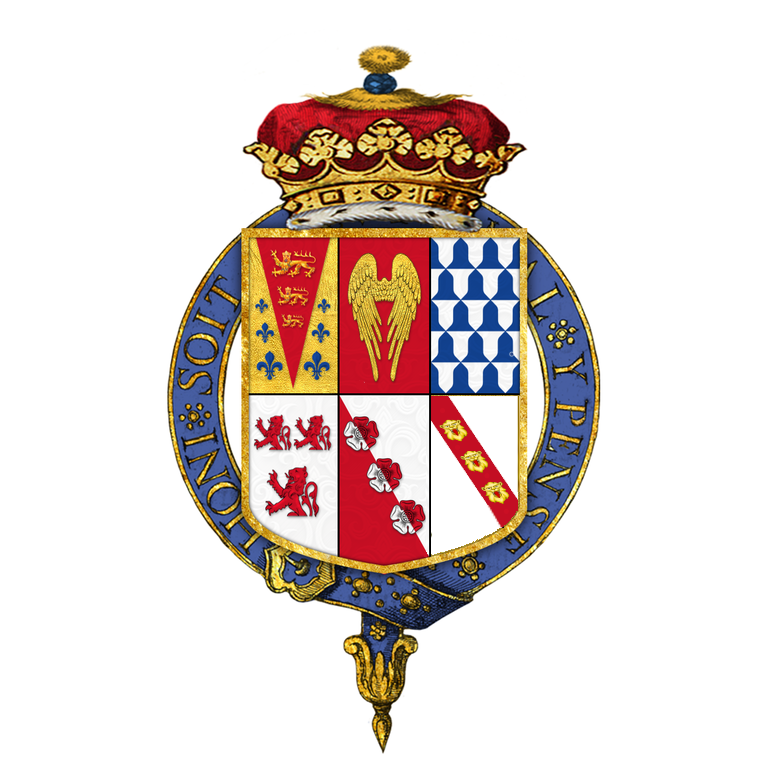
Coat of Arms of Edward Seymour, Viscount Beauchamp, following his sister Jane's marriage to Henry VIII in 1536

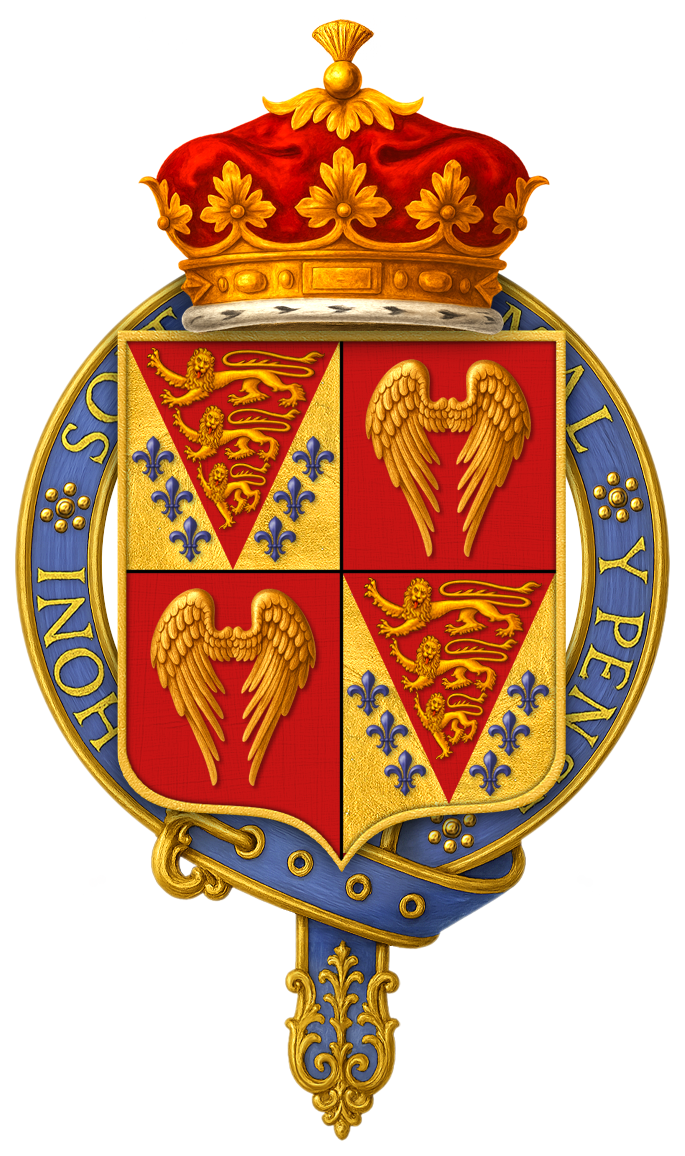
Coat of arms of Edward Seymour, 1st Duke of Somerset: Arms of Seymour, quartering the augmentation of honour

Historians Antonia Fraser, Diarmaid MacCulloch and Derek Wilson believe that the portrait depicts Elizabeth Seymour. Antonia Fraser has argued that the sitter is Jane Seymour's sister, Elizabeth, the widow of Sir Anthony Ughtred (d. 1534), on the grounds that the lady bears a resemblance to Jane, especially around the nose and chin, and wears widow's black. The lady's sumptuous black clothing, an indication of wealth and status, did not necessarily signify mourning; her jewellery suggests otherwise. Derek Wilson observed that "In August 1537 Cromwell succeeded in marrying his son, Gregory, to Elizabeth Seymour", the queen's younger sister. He was therefore related by marriage to the king, "an event worth recording for posterity, by a portrait of his daughter-in-law". According to Hans Holbein's most recent biographer, Franny Moyle, "One of the most striking portraits of a woman Holbein ever delivered was of Cromwell's daughter-in-law, painted probably in 1539 as she turned twenty-one."

== Lineage ==
Ancestors of Elizabeth Seymour, Lady Cromwell

8. John Seymour of Stapleford
4. John Seymour of Wulfhall
9. Elizabeth Croker
2. Sir John Seymour of Wulfhall
10. Sir George Darrell of Littlecote
5. Elizabeth Darrell
11. Hon. Margaret Stourton of Littlecote
1. Elizabeth Seymour
12. Sir Philip Wentworth of Nettlestead
6. Sir Henry Wentworth of Nettlestead
13. Hon. Mary Clifford
3. Margaret Wentworth
14. Sir John Saye of Baas
7. Anne Saye
15. Elizabeth Cheney

== Bibliography ==
- Adams, Charles Kingsley (September 1964). "Portraiture Problems and Genealogy". The Genealogists' Magazine. 14 (11): 382–388.
- Andrews, William Frampton (1886). Memorial Brasses in Hertfordshire Churches. Hertford: Stephen Austin and Sons.
- Aubrey, John; Jackson, John Edward (1862). Wiltshire: The Topographical Collections of John Aubrey, F.R.S., A.D. 1659–70, With Illustrations. London, UK: Wiltshire Archaeological and Natural History Society.
- Beer, Barrett L. (2004). "Jane [née Jane Seymour]". Oxford Dictionary of National Biography (online ed.). Oxford University Press. doi:10.1093/ref:odnb/14647. (Subscription, Wikipedia Library access or UK public library membership required.)
- Beer, Barrett L. (January 2009) [First published 2004]. "Seymour, Edward, duke of Somerset [known as Protector Somerset]". Oxford Dictionary of National Biography (online ed.). Oxford University Press. doi:10.1093/ref:odnb/25159. (Subscription, Wikipedia Library access or UK public library membership required.)
- Bernard, G.W. (May 2011) [2004]. "Seymour, Thomas, Baron Seymour of Sudeley". Oxford Dictionary of National Biography (online ed.). Oxford University Press. doi:10.1093/ref:odnb/25181. (Subscription, Wikipedia Library access or UK public library membership required.)
- Bindoff, S.T. (1982). "Cromwell, Thomas (by 1485–1540), of London". In Bindoff, S.T. (ed.). Members. The History of Parliament: The House of Commons 1509–1558. Vol. 1: Appendices, constituencies, members A–C. London, UK: Secker & Warburg. ISBN 0-436-04282-7. Archived from the original on 7 May 2014.
- Boutell, Charles (1863). A Manual of Heraldry, Historical and Popular. London: Winsor & Newton.
- Brown, William, ed. (2013). Yorkshire Deeds. Vol. 2. Cambridge: Cambridge University Press. ISBN 978-1-108-05841-4.
- Burke, John (1836). A Genealogical and Heraldic History of the Commoners of Great Britain and Ireland, Enjoying Territorial Possessions or High Official Rank; But Invested With Heritable Honours. Vol. III. London, UK: Published for Henry Colburn by R. Bentley.
- "Calendar of State Papers, Spain". British-history.ac.uk.
- Calendar of the Patent Rolls Preserved in the Public Record Office: Elizabeth [I]. London, UK: H.M.S.O. 1939. OCLC 962334. at HathiTrust
- Carthew, G.A. (1878). The Hundred of Launditch and Deanery of Brisley; in the County of Norfolk; Evidences and Topographical Notes from public records, Heralds' Visitations, Wills, Court Rolls, Old Charters, Parish Registers, Town books, and Other Private Sources; Digested and Arranged as Materials for Parochial, Manorial, and Family History. Vol. II. Norwich, UK: Printed by Miller and Leavins.
- Cokayne, G.E. (1912). Gibbs, Vicary (ed.). The Complete Peerage of England, Scotland, Ireland, Great Britain, and the United Kingdom, Extant, Extinct, or Dormant. Vol. II (New ed.). London, UK: St Catherine Press. p. 16. OCLC 1114291328.
- Cokayne, G.E. (1913). Gibbs, Vicary; Doubleday, H. Arthur (eds.). The Complete Peerage of England, Scotland, Ireland, Great Britain and the United Kingdom, Extant, Extinct or Dormant. Vol. III. London, UK: St. Catherine Press.
- Cokayne, G.E. (2000). Gibbs, Vicary; Doubleday, H.A.; White, Geoffrey H.; Warrand, Duncan; Lord Howard de Walden (eds.). The Complete Peerage of England, Scotland, Ireland, Great Britain and the United Kingdom, Extant, Extinct or Dormant. Vol. III (new ed.). Gloucester, UK: Alan Sutton Publishing. pp. 555, 557–558.
- Cokayne, G.E. (1916). Gibbs, Vicary (ed.). The Complete Peerage of England, Scotland, Ireland, Great Britain and the United Kingdom, Extant, Extinct or Dormant. Vol. IV. London, UK: St. Catherine Press.
- Cokayne, G.E. (1898). Complete Peerage of England, Scotland, Ireland, Great Britain and the United Kingdom, Extant, Extinct or Dormant. Vol. VIII. Exeter: William Pollard.
- Colby, Frederic Thomas, ed. (1872). The Visitation of the County of Devon in the Year 1620. Publications of the Harleian Society. Vol. VI. London, UK: Printed by Taylor and Co.
- College of Arms; Black, William Henry; Young, Charles George (1829). Catalogue of the Arundel Manuscripts in the Library of the College of Arms. [By William Henry Black. With a Preface Signed: C. G. Y., i.e. Sir Charles George Young]. London: Printed by S. and R. Bentley. p. 63. OCLC 719406887.
- Collins, Francis, ed. (1887). "Yorkshire Fines: 1511–15". Feet of Fines of the Tudor period [Yorks]: part 1: 1486-1571. British-history.ac.uk.
- Cust, Lionel (July 1910). "A portrait of Queen Catherine Howard, by Hans Holbein the Younger". The Burlington Magazine. 17 (88): 193–199. JSTOR 858358.
- Dasent, John Roche, ed. (1892) [First published HMSO:1892]. Acts of the Privy Council of England. New Series. Vol. IV: 1552–1554. British-history.ac.uk.
- Davids, R.L. (1982). Bindoff, S.T. (ed.). "Seymour, Sir John (1473/74–1536), of Wolf Hall, Wilts". Members. The History of Parliament: the House of Commons 1509–1558. Archived from the original on 23 October 2013 – via History of Parliament Online.
- Ellis, Henry (1825). Original Letters Illustrative of English History. Second Series. Vol. II (2nd ed.). London, UK: Harding and Lepard.
- Ellis, Henry (1827). Original Letters Illustrative of English History. Second Series. Vol. II. London, UK: Harding and Lepard.
- Ellis, Henry (1846). Original Letters Illustrative of English History. third series. Vol. III. London, UK: RichardBentley.
- Faris, David (1999). Plantagenet Ancestry of Seventeenth-Century Colonists: The Descent from the Later Plantagenet Kings of England, Henry III, Edward I, Edward II, and Edward III, of Emigrants from England and Wales to the North American Colonies Before 1701 (2nd ed.). Boston, MA: New England Historic Genealogical Society. ISBN 0-88082-107-8.
- Fitzgerald, Teri (18 August 2019). "All that Glitters: Hans Holbein's Lady of the Cromwell Family". queenanneboleyn.com. Archived from the original on 20 September 2019.
- Fitzgerald, Teri; MacCulloch, Diarmaid (2016). "Gregory Cromwell: two portrait miniatures by Hans Holbein the Younger". The Journal of Ecclesiastical History. 67 (3): 587–601. doi:10.1017/S0022046915003322.(subscription required)
- Flower, William (1881). Norcliffe, Charles Best (ed.). The Visitation of Yorkshire in the Years 1563 and 1564, Made by William Flower, Esquire, Norroy king of Arms. Publications of the Harleian Society. Vol. XVI. London, UK: Mitchell and Hughes, Printers.
- Foxe, John (1838). Cattley, S.R. (ed.). The Acts and Monuments of John Foxe. Vol. V.
- Fraser, Antonia (2002). The Six Wives of Henry VIII. London, UK: Phoenix. ISBN 978-1-8421-2633-2.
- Fuidge, N.M. (1981). "Ughtred, Henry (by 1534–aft. October 1598), of Southampton and Ireland". In Hasler, P.W. (ed.). Members. The History of Parliament: The House of Commons 1558–1603. Archived from the original on 13 January 2021 – via History of Parliament Online.
- Hall, Edward (1809). Hall's chronicle; Containing the History of England, During the Reign of Henry the Fourth, and the Succeeding Monarchs, to the End of the Reign of Henry the Eighth, in Which are Particularly Described the Manners and Customs of Those Periods. London, UK: J. Johnson; F. C. and J. Rivington; T. Payne; Wilkie and Robinson; Longman, Hurst, Rees and Orme; Cadell and Davies; and J. Mawman.
- Hawkyard, A.D.K. (1982). "Cromwell, Gregory (by 1516–51), of Lewes, Suss.; Leeds Castle, Kent and Launde, Leics.". In Bindoff, S.T. (ed.). Members. The History of Parliament: the House of Commons 1509–1558 – via History of Parliament Online.
- Hawkyard, A.D.K. (1982). "Seymour, Sir Henry (by 1503–78), of Marwell, Hants.". In Bindoff, S.T. (ed.). Members. The History of Parliament: the House of Commons 1509–1558. Archived from the original on 30 March 2014 – via History of Parliament Online.
- Hawkyard, A.D.K. (1982). "Seymour, Sir Thomas II (by 1509–49), of Bromham, Wilts., Seymour Place, London and Sudeley Castle, Glos.". In Bindoff, S.T. (ed.). The History of Parliament: the House of Commons 1509–1558. Archived from the original on 30 April 2014 – via History of Parliament Online.
- Holinshed, Raphael (1808). Holinshed's Chronicles of England, Scotland and Ireland. Vol. 3: England. London, UK: J. Johnson [et al].
- "Journal of the House of Lords". British-history.ac.uk.
- Leithead, Howard (2008) [2004]. "Cromwell, Thomas, Earl of Essex". Oxford Dictionary of National Biography (online ed.). Oxford University Press. doi:10.1093/ref:odnb/6769. (Subscription, Wikipedia Library access or UK public library membership required.)
- "Letters and Papers, Foreign and Domestic, Henry VIII" – via British History Online.
- Lipscomb, Suzannah (April 2013). "Why Did Anne Boleyn Have to Die". BBC History Magazine. 14 (4): 18–24.
- Loades, David (2013). Jane Seymour: Henry VIII's Favourite Wife (hardback). Stroud, UK: Amberley. ISBN 978-1-4456-1157-0.
- MacCarthy-Morrogh, Michael (2016) [July 1983]. The Munster Plantation, 1583-1641 (PDF) (PhD). Ann Arbor. 10097527.
- Machyn, Henry (1848). Nichols, John Gough (ed.). The Diary of Henry Machyn, Citizen and Merchant–Taylor of London, from A. D. 1550 to A. D. 1563. [Camden Society. Publications]. Vol. XLII. London, UK: Camden Society by J.B. Nichols and Son.
- MacCulloch, Diarmaid (2018). Thomas Cromwell: A Life. London: Allen Lane. ISBN 978-0-14-196766-0.
- MacMahon, Luke (2004). "Ughtred, Sir Anthony". Oxford Dictionary of National Biography (online ed.). Oxford University Press. doi:10.1093/ref:odnb/27979. (Subscription, Wikipedia Library access or UK public library membership required.)
- Moyle, Franny (2021). The King's Painter: The Life and Times of Hans Holbein. London: Head of Zeus. ISBN 978-1-78854-120-6.
- Nichols, John Gough, ed. (1846). Chronicle of Calais, in the Reigns of Henry VII and Henry VIII to the Year 1540. Camden Society. Publications. Vol. 35. London, UK: Camden Society by J. B. Nichols and Son.
- N.M.S. (1981). "Cromwell, Thomas (c.1540–c.1611), of King's Lynn, Norf.". In Hasler, P.W. (ed.). The History of Parliament: the House of Commons 1558-1603 – via History of Parliament Online.
- Noble, Mark (1784). Memoirs of Several Persons and Families Who, by Females are Allied to, or Descended from the Protectorate–House of Cromwell. Birmingham, UK: Pearson and Rollason. p. 8.
- Norris, Herbert (1998). Tudor Costume and Fashion (new ed.). New York: Dover Publications. ISBN 0-486-29845-0.
- Norton, Elizabeth (2009). Jane Seymour: Henry VIII's True Love (hardback). Chalford, UK: Amberley Publishing. ISBN 978-1-84868-102-6.
- Norton, Elizabeth (23 July 2026). Jane Seymour: Patronage, Material Culture and Image Crafting (1st ed.). London: Routledge. ASIN B0GJ192YHM. doi:10.4324/9781003430544. ISBN 9781003430544. OCLC 1609860818.
- Pevsner, Nikolaus; Williamson, Elizabeth; Brandwood, Geoffrey K. (2003). The Buildings of England: Leicestershire and Rutland (hardback) (2nd ed.). New Haven; London: Yale University Press. ISBN 0-300-09618-6.
- Pole, Reginald; Mayer, Thomas F.; Walters, Courtney B. (2008). Thomas F. Mayer; Courtney B. Walters (eds.). The Correspondence of Reginald Pole. Vol. 4: A Biographical Companion: The British Isles. Aldershot: Ashgate Publishing. ISBN 978-0-7546-0329-0.
- Pollard, Albert Frederick (1897). "Seymour, Edward (1506?-1552)" . In Lee, Sidney (ed.). Dictionary of National Biography. Vol. 51. London: Smith, Elder & Co. pp. 299–310. 25159.
- Richardson, Douglas (2011). Everingham, Kimball G. (ed.). Magna Carta Ancestry: A Study in Colonial and Medieval Families. Vol. III (2nd ed.). CreateSpace. ISBN 978-1-4610-4520-5.
- Richardson, Douglas (2011). Everingham, Kimball G. (ed.). Plantagenet Ancestry: A Study in Colonial and Medieval Families. Vol. III (2nd ed.). CreateSpace. ISBN 978-1-4610-4513-7.
- Roper, William (2003). Wegemer, Gerard B.; Smith, Stephen W. (eds.). The Life of Sir Thomas More, c. 1556 (PDF). Center for Thomas More Studies. Archived from the original (PDF) on 7 December 2013.
- Roskell, J.S.; Knightly, Charles (1993). "Sturmy (Esturmy), Sir William (c.1356-1427), of Wolf Hall in Great Bedwyn, Wilts. and Elvetham, Hants.". In Roskell, J.S.; Clark, C. Rawcliffe (eds.). Members. The History of Parliament: the House of Commons 1386–1421.
- Rowlands, John (1985). Holbein: The Paintings of Hans Holbein the Younger. Oxford: Phaidon. ISBN 978-0-7148-2358-4.
- Russell, Gareth (14 May 2010). "May 14th, 1536: Mistress Seymour's New Lodgings". Confessions of a Ci-Devant. Archived from the original on 21 July 2020.
- Russell, Gareth (2017). Young and Damned and Fair: the Life of Catherine Howard. London: William Collins. ISBN 978-0-00-812829-6.
- Schofield, John (2011). The Rise & Fall of Thomas Cromwell: Henry VIII's Most Faithful Servant. The History Press. ISBN 978-0-7524-5866-3.
- Seymour, William (1972). Ordeal by Ambition: An English Family in the Shadow of the Tudors. London, UK: Sidgwick & Jackson. ISBN 0-283-97866-X.
- Soberton, Sylvia Barbara (2022). Ladies-In-Waiting: Women Who Served Anne Boleyn. Golden Age Publishing. ISBN 979-8-8263-2602-2.
- Starkey, David (2007). Grosvenor, Bendor (ed.). Lost Faces: Identity and Discovery in Tudor Royal Portraiture. Catalogue of an exhibition held at the galleries of Philip Mould Ltd, 6–18 March 2007. London: Philip Mould Ltd. pp. 70–75, ill. (col.), 109–124: Inventory is BL Stowe MS 599, ff. 55–68.
- Starkey, David (2004). Six Wives: The Queens of Henry VIII. London, UK: Vintage. ISBN 978-0-09-943724-6.
- Strong, Roy (May 1967). "Holbein in England – I and II". The Burlington Magazine. 109 (770): 276–281. JSTOR 875299.
- Strong, Roy (1995). The Tudor and Stuart Monarchy: Pageantry, Painting, Iconography. Vol. I: Tudor. Woodbridge, UK: The Boydell Press. ISBN 0-85115-400-X.
- Strype, John (1822). Ecclesiastical Memorials. Vol. II. Oxford, UK: Clarendon Press.
- Syvret, George S.; Carteret, Samuel de (1832). Chroniques des Iles de Jersey, Guernesey, Auregny et Serk (in French). Guernesey: de l'imprimerie de Thomas James Mauger.
- Thornton, Tim (2012). The Channel Islands, 1370–1640: Between England and Normandy. Woodbridge, UK: The Boydell Press. ISBN 978-1-84383-711-4. JSTOR 10.7722/j.ctt81dsb.
- Wagner, John A.; Schmid, Susan Walters (2012). Encyclopedia of Tudor England (hardback). Vol. 3. Santa Barbara: ABC-CLIO. ISBN 978-1-59884-298-2.
- Wilson, Derek (2006). Hans Holbein: Portrait of an Unknown Man (revised ed.). London, UK: Random House. ISBN 978-1-84413-918-7.
- Wood, Mary Anne Everett, ed. (1846). Letters of Royal and Illustrious Ladies of Great Britain, from the Commencement of the Twelfth Century to the Close of the Reign of Queen Mary. Vol. II. London, UK: Henry Colburn.
- Wood, Mary Anne Everett, ed. (1846). Letters of Royal and Illustrious Ladies of Great Britain, from the Commencement of the Twelfth Century to the Close of the Reign of Queen Mary. Vol. III. London, UK: Henry Colburn.
- Wriothesley, Charles (1875). Hamilton, William Douglas (ed.). A Chronicle Of England During The Reigns Of The Tudors: From A.D. 1485 To 1559 I. Camden Society. New Series. Vol. XI. London, UK: Camden Society.
