= Portrait of a Lady, probably a Member of the Cromwell Family =

Painting by Hans Holbein the Younger

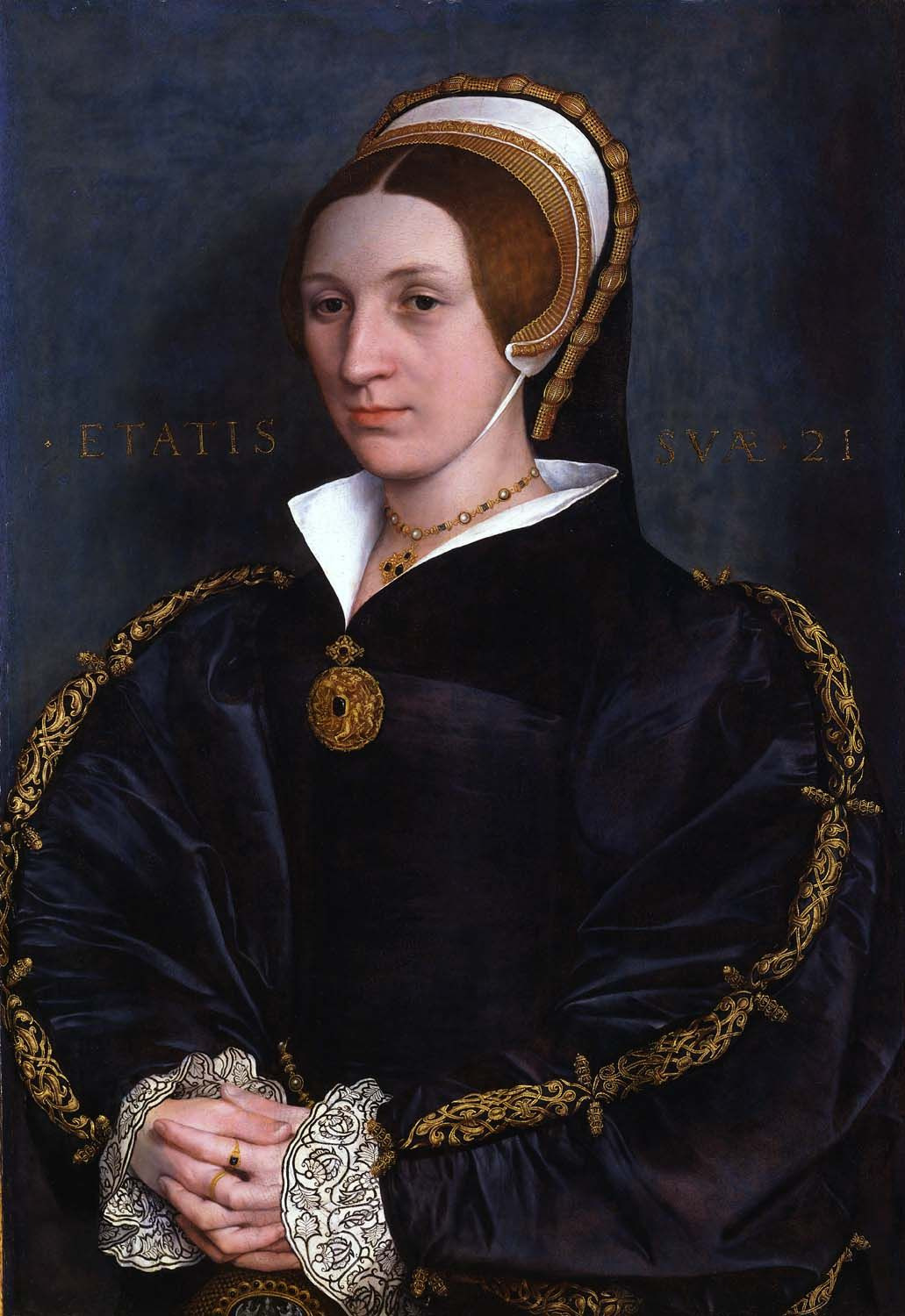
- Artist: Hans Holbein the Younger
- Year: c. 1535–1540
- Medium: oil on panel
- Dimensions: 72.1 cm × 49.5 cm (28.4 in × 19.5 in)
- Location: Toledo Museum of Art, Toledo, Ohio
- Accession: 1926.57
- Website: www.toledomuseum.org

Coat of Arms of Jane Seymour, with the augmentation of honour granted by Henry VIII on her marriage: Or, on a pile gules between six fleurs-de-lys azure three lions of England.

Portrait of a Lady, probably a Member of the Cromwell Family is an oil on panel portrait completed in around 1535–1540 by Hans Holbein the Younger now at the Toledo Museum of Art. The painting shows an elegantly but demurely dressed young woman sitting against a blue-grey background. The subject of this portrait is thought to be a member of the Cromwell family, perhaps Thomas Cromwell's daughter-in-law, Elizabeth Seymour, sister to Jane, third consort of Henry VIII.

The painting is inscribed in gold — ETATIS SVÆ 21 — the sitter's age: 21; her sumptuous clothing and jewellery indicates that she is a lady of high status. She wears a French hood edged with white, heavily embroidered in gold, with a falling black veil. She has auburn hair, parted in the middle and blue-grey eyes. Around her neck she wears a necklace set with pearls and diamonds, to which is attached a pendant jewel. Her black satin gown, with a square black velvet yoke, is open at the neck and turned back to show the white lining. The sleeves, decorated with stylised vines in gold with a fleur-de-lis motif, are fastened at intervals with gold aiglets; richly embroidered cambric ruffles are showing at the wrists.

On the bodice of her gown, is a brooch from which hangs a large circular pendant with a diamond at the centre and a biblical theme: Lot with his family, guided by an angel, fleeing from Sodom. To the left of the central gem is Lot's wife who was turned to a pillar of salt because she disobeyed God and looked back to Sodom. A design by Holbein for this pendant survives in the British Museum. Another larger circular jewel, probably also designed by Holbein, is attached to her girdle, depicting God the Father enthroned, flanked by angels.

Two related copies of the portrait are extant: a 16th-century version at Hever Castle in Kent: Portrait of a Lady, thought to be Catherine Howard. and another from the late 17th-century at the National Portrait Gallery, London: Unknown woman, formerly known as Catherine Howard.

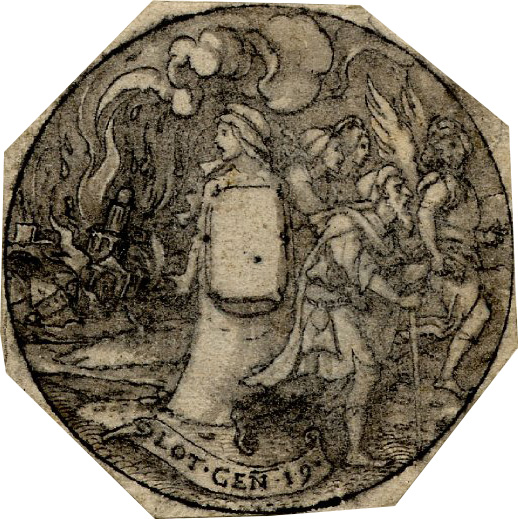
Medallion of Lot with his family, guided by an angel, fleeing from Sodom. Hans Holbein the Younger. (British Museum)

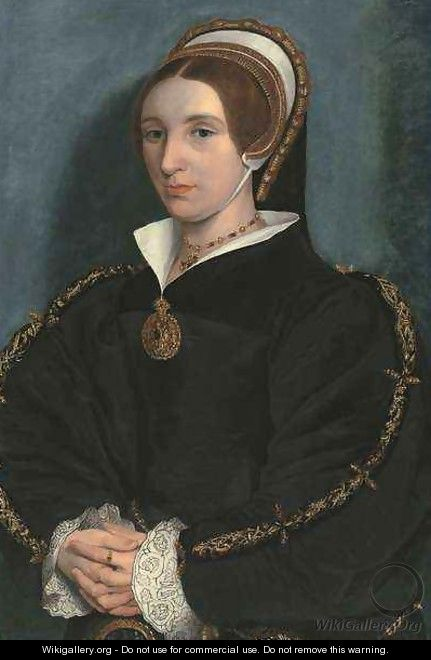
Portrait of a Lady, thought to be Catherine Howard. 16th-century. Follower of Hans Holbein the Younger. (Hever Castle)

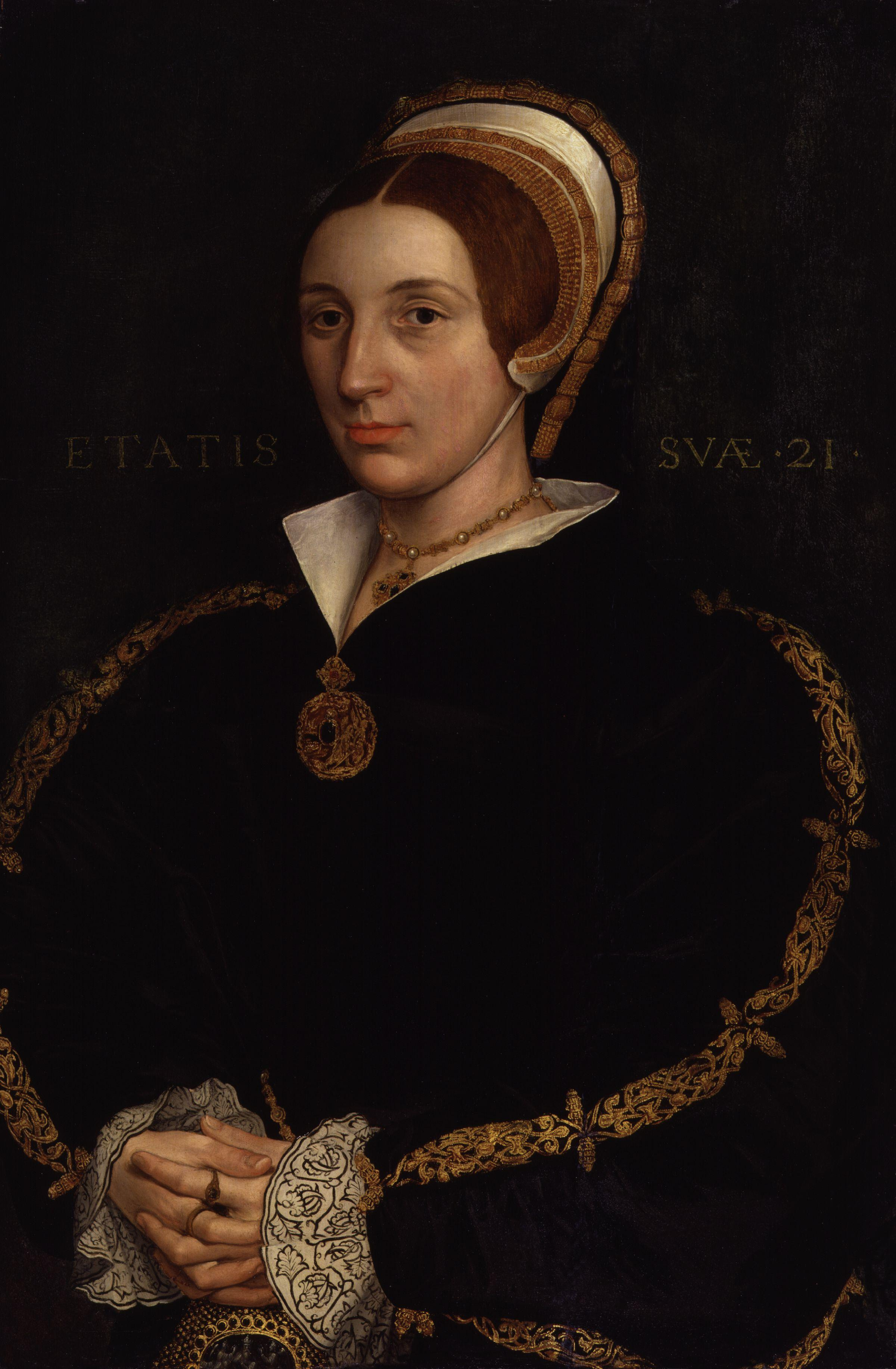
Unknown woman, formerly known as Catherine Howard. Late 17th-century. After Hans Holbein the Younger. (National Portrait Gallery)

== Identification ==
In 1909 Sir Lionel Cust identified the portrait which had been in the possession of the Cromwell family for centuries as Catherine Howard. Cust's identification stood unchallenged until doubts were raised about the sitter's identity in the catalogue of The Kings and Queens of England exhibition held at Liverpool in 1953. A further attempt to identify the lady as Queen Catherine Howard was made by Bendor Grosvenor, David Starkey and Alasdair Hawkyard in the Lost faces exhibition catalogue in 2007.

In the 1960s Sir Roy Strong, following the lead of Charles Kingsley Adams, noted that both the Toledo portrait and the National Portrait Gallery version appear in the context of a series of portraits of members of the family of the Protector's uncle, Sir Oliver Cromwell, and have provenances linking them with the Cromwell family. He argued that the portrait in the Toledo Museum of Art should by rights depict a lady with strong ties to the Cromwell family who was 21 in around 1535 to 1540. He stated that a dated parallel for costume (a short-lived style), notably the distinctive cut of the sleeves, is Holbein's Christina of Denmark of 1538. John Rowlands agreed that stylistically the portrait belonged to the period c. 1535–40, but considered that the French Hood "suggests a date towards its end."

In Thomas Cromwell's family Strong identified two women who might have been around the right age to be the sitter: Frances Murfyn (c. 1520 – c. 1543), the wife of Sir Richard Cromwell, and a lady of the highest social standing: Elizabeth Seymour (c. 1518 – 1568), who married, successively, Sir Anthony Ughtred (d. 1534), Gregory Cromwell, 1st Baron Cromwell (c. 1520 – 1551) and John Paulet, 2nd Marquess of Winchester (c. 1510 – 1576). Elizabeth was the daughter of Sir John Seymour of Wulfhall in Wiltshire and Margery Wentworth. She was a younger sister of Edward and Queen Jane as well as aunt to the future Edward VI. On 3 August 1537, when she was about nineteen or twenty, Elizabeth, Lady Ughtred, married Thomas Cromwell's 17-year-old son, Gregory, with whom she would have three sons and two daughters. She served in the household of Anne Boleyn, Anne of Cleves and Catherine Howard. He suggested that Elizabeth Seymour might be the subject of the painting. Antonia Fraser argued that the sitter is Jane Seymour's sister, Elizabeth, the widow of Sir Anthony Ughtred (d. 1534), on the grounds that the lady bears a resemblance to Jane, especially around the nose and chin, and wears widow's black. Derek Wilson observed that "in August 1537 Cromwell succeeded in marrying his son, Gregory, to Elizabeth Seymour", the queen's younger sister. He was therefore related by marriage to the king, "an event worth recording for posterity, by a portrait of his daughter-in-law".

=== Heraldry ===
Cromwell's biographer, Diarmaid MacCulloch compared the heraldic achievement of Thomas Cromwell of 1537 with that of Edward Seymour (augmented the year before) and noticed striking similarities. Cromwell was granted a coat of augmentation following the marriage of his son to the queen's sister in August 1537; the second and third quarters have a division of six, with fleurs-de-lis alternating with pelicans and possess "the same unusual threefold structure, same metal and colours, fleurs de lys, and a feral creature" as the coat of augmentation granted to Edward Seymour when he was made Viscount Beauchamp, following his sister, Jane's, marriage to the king: Or, on a pile gules between six fleurs-de-lys azure three lions of England.

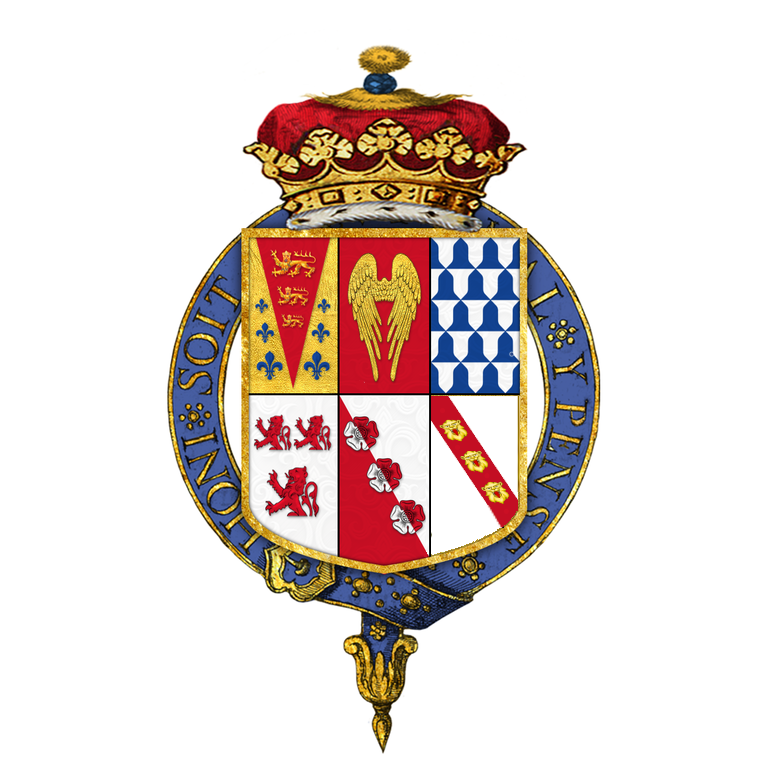
Coat of arms of Edward Seymour, Viscount Beauchamp

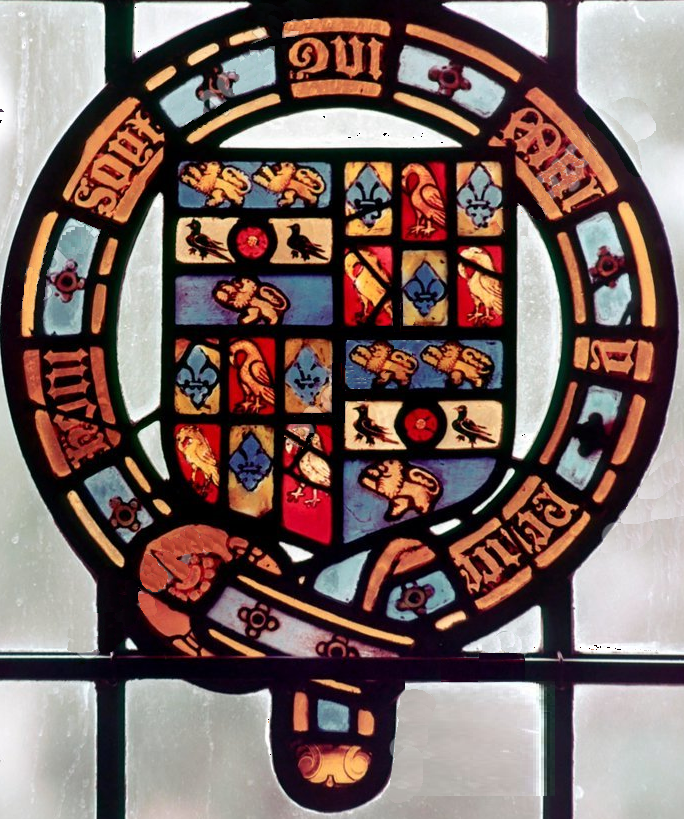
Coat of arms of Thomas Cromwell, 1st Earl of Essex, KG, 16th-century stained glass, Bodleian Library, Oxford

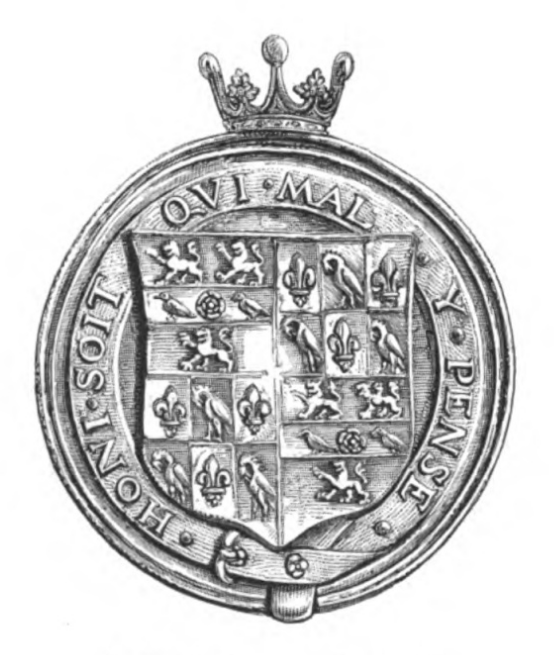
Medal with bust of Thomas Cromwell. Reverse: Armorial shield of Cromwell, being two coats quarterly, within the Garter, 1538. British Museum

=== Symbolism ===
In the Toledo portrait Holbein provides visual puns and heraldic clues to identify the sitter: firstly, an angel, a heavenly being depicted with birds' wings. The angel in the sitter's pendant jewel represents the arms of Sir John Seymour (a pair of golden wings): Gules, a pair of "angels' wynges" conjoined in lure Or. The angel was also an English gold coin patterned after the French angelot or ange. The name derived from its representation of the Archangel Michael slaying a dragon. It has been suggested that the coin may have been the inspiration for the portrait.

The golden vines (a Biblical motif) on her wing-like sleeves, symbolising abundance and wealth (manche: ailes de vignes d'or) encircle the angels' wings in her pendant jewel (ange: ailes divines d'or). The six fleurs-de-lis on her left sleeve represent those in the Seymour augmentation and that of Cromwell. In the Cromwell arms "the pelican carried an evangelical message, yet it could also echo the main motif of the original Seymour family coat, birds' wings conjoined." It is clear that this 21-year-old lady has close ties to both the Seymour and the Cromwell families: the angels and the fleurs-de-lis symbolise a Seymour-Cromwell marital alliance. "There can be little doubt that this Holbein masterpiece, the original in Toledo, depicts Elizabeth Seymour".

Arms of Sir John Seymour: Gules, a pair of "angels' wynges" conjoined in lure Or

Seymour: coat of augmentation, 1536

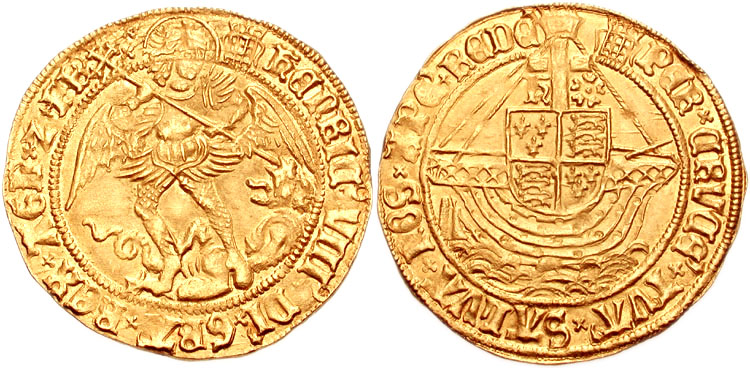
Henry VIII angel, struck 1513–1526. Obverse: The Archangel Michael slaying a dragon. Reverse: A ship surmounted by a shield bearing the King's arms

Franny Moyle observed that "One of the most striking portraits of a woman Holbein ever delivered was of Cromwell's daughter-in-law, painted probably in 1539 as she turned twenty-one."

== Provenance ==
Probably by descent to the Cromwell-Bush family from Sir Richard Cromwell, nephew of Thomas Cromwell; first recorded in the family home, Cheshunt Park, Hertfordshire, by George Perfect Harding in the lifetime of Oliver Cromwell (1742–1821), who listed it as "Mary Tudor, Queen of France and Duchess of Suffolk"; labels formerly on the reverse called it "[Oliver] Cromwell's Mother" and "Duchess of Suffolk"; Colnaghi, London; James Dunn, 1911; Edward Drummond Libbey, 1915, who presented it to the Toledo Museum of Art in 1925.

== See also ==
- Artists of the Tudor court
- List of paintings by Hans Holbein the Younger
