= Charles Kingsley (disambiguation) =

Charles Kingsley (1819–1875) was an English writer and priest.

Charles Kingsley may also refer to:

- Charles W. Kingsley (1860–1931), Scottish-American machinist, blacksmith and politician
- Charles Kingsley (tennis) (1899–1996), amateur English tennis player
- Charles Kingsley (yacht designer) (1910–1996), British yacht designer and surveyor

== See also ==
- Charles Kingsley Adams, director of the National Portrait Gallery
- Charles Kingsley Barrett, British biblical scholar
- Charles Kingsley Meek, British anthropologist
- Charles Kingsley Webster, British diplomat and historian
