= Fair Oak Park =

Country house in Hampshire, England

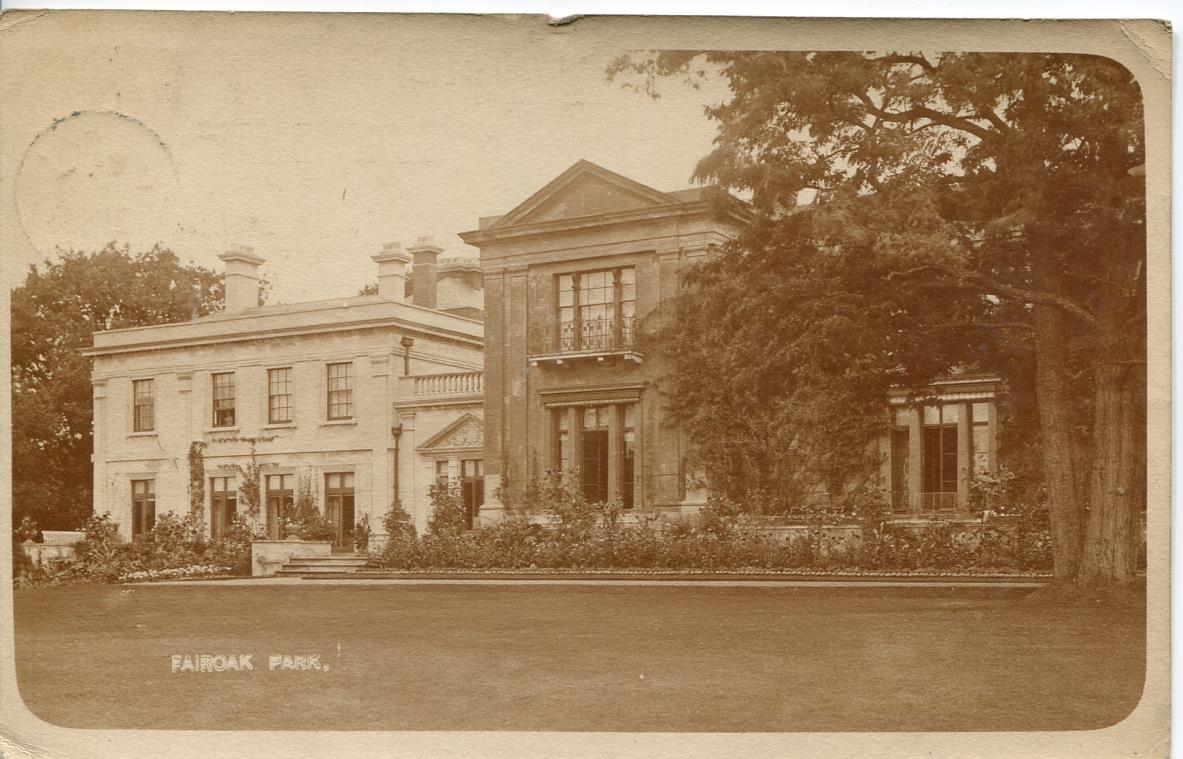
- Postcard of Fair Oak Park, sent in 1913

- Location within Hampshire

General information
- Location: Fair Oak, Hampshire
- Coordinates: 50.967595°N 1.286110°W

Fair Oak Park was a country house located to the east of the original village of Fair Oak in Hampshire, England. It was home to two sheriffs of Hampshire: Sir Samuel Raymond Jarvis, who sold it to James Edward Bradshaw. Subsequently, it was owned by Justice of the Peace George Herbert Pember.

The site of the house is now occupied by modern housing, but parts of the former grounds remain and are protected sites.

== Location ==
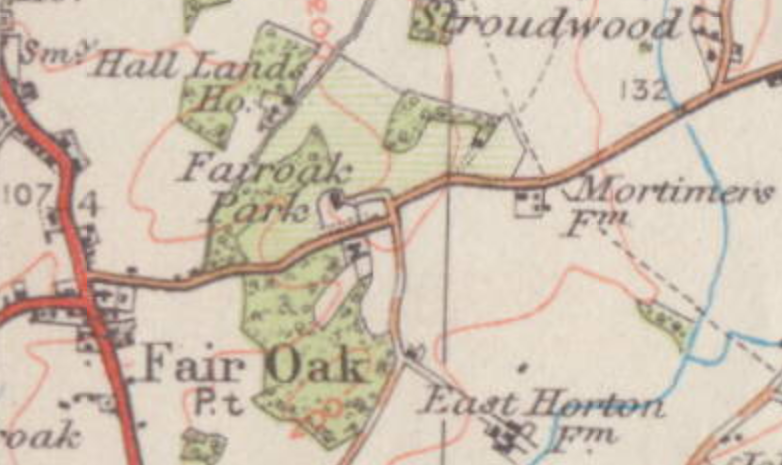
Ordnance Survey map showing location of Fair Oak Park (centre of the map) in relation to the village of Fair Oak (around the crossroads to the left of the map).

Ordnance Survey mapping from 1919 shows Fair Oak Park House situated where the junction of Mimosa Drive and Glenwood Court is today. The driveway from the house ran northeastwards, parallel to Mortimers Lane, before turning at a right angle and joining Mortimers Lane directly opposite Knowle Lane.

== History ==
The property was home to Sir Samuel Raymond Jarvis in 1834, who served as Sheriff of Hampshire in that year and 1835-6. He was also a member of the Royal Agricultural Society of England in 1839. In 1845 a Sir Raymond Jarvis living at Fair Oak Park was listed as a director of both the Isle of Wight Railway and the Manchester and Southampton Railway, and a member of the provisional committee of the Direct London and Exeter Railway Company. It is unknown whether this Sir Raymond Jarvis was the same person as Sir Samuel Raymond Jarvis or a relative.

Sir Samuel Raymond Jarvis sold the 450-acre Fair Oak Park estate to James Edward Bradshaw by auction in 1845. Bradshaw's family history could be traced back to Sir John de Bradshaw, whom William the Conqueror granted lands to. As well as Fair Oak Park, James Bradshaw owned Darcy Lever Hall in Lancashire. He was appointed Sheriff of the County of Southampton for the year 1856. In a magazine of March 1874, a J B Bradshaw of Fair Oak Park said that he "does not hunt now, but has the best covert in the hunt for foxes, is a capital coachman, and can put four horses together better than most people." The property was described in 1878 as "a large and handsome brick mansion, with extensive and well-wooded pleasure grounds".

Fair Oak Park marked the eastern boundary of the parish of Bishopstoke until 1894 when Fair Oak became a parish in its own right, followed five years later by Stoke Park. At that time the grounds of Fair Oak Park included roughly 120 acres (49 ha) of land.

By 1902 the estate had passed into the ownership of George Herbert Pember, who set about making a number of structural changes; the first, in 1902, consisted of alterations to the house and stables, and this was followed in 1906 by the building of a new motor garage. Pember had been born in 1846 in Rayleigh, Essex, and although a stockbroker by trade, was appointed Justice of the Peace for Hampshire. In 1910 he married Constance Mary Portal, the daughter of Sir Wyndham Spencer Portal, in London. Pember died in 1921.

By 1958 the house was semi-derelict and in a state of poor repair. Ordnance Survey maps of 1960, 1961 and 1968 show the house still existed at that point, although the route of the driveway had been considerably altered since the 1919 map. However by the time of the 1970 map, the house was gone with only the ponds and some other parts of the gardens remaining, and by 1975 the site of the house itself and much of the gardens had been replaced by modern housing.

Today, parts of the site are designated a Site of Importance for Nature Conservation. As of December 2011 any remaining buildings were proposed for listing although as of January 2017 there was no visual evidence of Fair Oak Park House itself remaining.

== Grounds and gardens ==
The site is listed as a Historic Garden in the Hampshire Country register, and remains of the pleasure gardens are still present around a pond and Allington Stream, which ran through the gardens. The grounds also included a copse, Gore Copse; this, and the parkland surrounding Hall Lands House, are the only parts of the 19th century parkland that remain intact according to a statement from Hampshire Gardens Trust in January 2017.
