= Cove Cottage =

Coordinates: 50°35′39″N 1°12′36″W

Cove Cottage is a Grade II listed house in Ventnor on the Isle of Wight in England. The cottage is located on Belgrave Road in the town and is dated 1828; it was listed on 14 July 1976. It was owned by the army officer Samuel Raymond Jarvis until his death there on 5 December 1868.
