= Samuel Raymond Jarvis =

Sir Samuel Raymond Jarvis
- Born: 1790
- Died: 5 December 1868 (aged 77–78) Ventnor, Isle of Wight
- Rank: Lieutenant-Colonel
- Conflicts: Invasion of Martinique (1809), Invasion of Guadeloupe (1810)

Lieutenant-Colonel Sir Samuel Raymond Jarvis (1790 – 1851) was an army officer who served as High Sheriff of Hampshire.

== Early life ==
Jarvis was born in 1790, the son of another Samuel Jarvis, and lived at the family home of Fair Oak Park in Hampshire.

== Career ==
On 12 April 1806 he enrolled in the Army, joining the Royal Irish Regiment, known at the time as the 18th Regiment of Foot, as an ensign. The following year, he was promoted to lieutenant and transferred to the King's Own Scottish Borderers, known as the 25th Regiment of Foot. He was involved in the Invasion of Martinique (1809) and the Invasion of Guadeloupe (1810).

In 1816 he was placed on half-pay and in April of the following year he became a captain in a Cavalry Reserve Regiment, the 2nd Life Guards. He transferred to the 7th Light Dragoons in March 1823. Jarvis was promoted again, to the rank of Major in the 3rd West India Regiment on 10 January 1837.

Jarvis was one of the original promoters of the "Southampton, London and Branch Railway and Dock Company", which would become the London and Southampton Railway, listed in the prospectus issued on 6 April 1831.

Jarvis was appointed High Sheriff of Hampshire in 1834 and received his knighthood on 17 September of that year, at St James's Palace.

His final promotion in the Army came on 11 November 1851, when he received the rank of Lieutenant-Colonel. He left the Army on 6 March 1863, having been made captain of the 3rd West India Regiment on that day.

== Personal life ==
Jarvis died on 5 December 1868 at his home, Cove Cottage, in Ventnor on the Isle of Wight.
