= Charles Kingsley (yacht designer) =

British yacht designer and surveyor (1910–1996)

- Born: 30 January 1910
- Died: 13 February 1996 (aged 86)
- Citizenship: United Kingdom
- Occupation: Yacht Designer
- Years active: 1939-1996

Charles William Russell Kingsley V.R.D. A.R.I.N.A. (30 January 1910 – 13 February 1996) was a British yacht designer and surveyor.

== Background ==
His early life was spent on the Isle of Wight where he designed, built and sailed small boats or canoes of canvas covered wooden framed design. For most of his working life, he was employed in London as a Victualling Clerk for the Orient Line. His hobby, which consumed much of his spare time, was yacht designing and surveying although most of the design activity reduced considerably after the Second World War. During the war, he served in the RNVR, initially (from 1933) in the pay branch - he had poor eyesight - but volunteered successfully to transfer to the Special Branch reaching the rank of Lieutenant Commander in 1947.

He was a member of the Little Ship Club, which he joined aged 19, and won first prize in their yacht design competition in 1933, for which he received the sum of £5 5s. The competition was judged by, among others, Laurent Giles. In December 1935 he had a new design for an 8-ton cruiser (based to a certain extent on his prize winning design) published in Yachting Monthly magazine.

He was an associate of the Institution of Naval Architects (later the Royal Institution of Naval Architects) between 1935 and 1964.

== Yachts ==
=== Foie ===
Official Lloyd's number 165032.

Auxiliary Bermudian cutter. Long keel yacht of 9 tons and 36.0 ft LOA. Built by A. Everson & Sons of Woodbridge in 1936.

Date	Owner	Notes
1936	Capt. C. W. B. RICHARDS	Built, Everson and Sons of Woodbridge. Ipswich
15 May 1937	Capt. C. W. B. RICHARDS	Mentioned (along with Keryl) in the entry list for the RORC Maas race.
19 May 1937	Capt. C. W. B. RICHARDS	Mentioned (along with Keryl) as having 'given up' the RORC Maas race.
1939	Major C. W. B. RICHARDS	Ipswich, RORC Rating 27.14 ft.
1939-45	TBC	Burnt during War, ref?

=== Evarne ===
Official Lloyd's numbers and signal letters: 166103 MMNM, then 400070 from between 1965 and 1978.

Auxiliary cutter with Bermudian rig. Long keel yacht with counter stern and spoon bow. 11 tons, 37.4 ft LOA. Built by A. Everson & Sons of Woodbridge, Suffolk in 1937.

Photographed (unknown date) by Beken & Son of Cowes. Photograph number 28728. Sail number 170.

Date	Owner	Notes
1937	G. H. B. SHELTON	Built, Everson and Sons of Woodbridge.
21 May 1938	H. SHELTON	Mentioned (along with Keryl) in the entry list of The Thames Estuary Race of the Royal Corinthian Y. C. at Burnham.
1948	Capt. E. M. C. BARRACLOUGH, CBE, RN (ret.)	Ipswich, RORC Rating 23.85 ft
17 July 1953	Capt. E. M. C. BARRACLOUGH, CBE, RN (ret.)	Picture appears on page 14 of The Times while participating in the 21st Cowes to Dinard race.
1955	A. MORRIS	Ipswich
April 1956	A. MORRIS	Waterford
1978	G. WARD	Waterford, Crosshaven?
1980	G. WARD	Waterford, Crosshaven?

=== Isonda ===
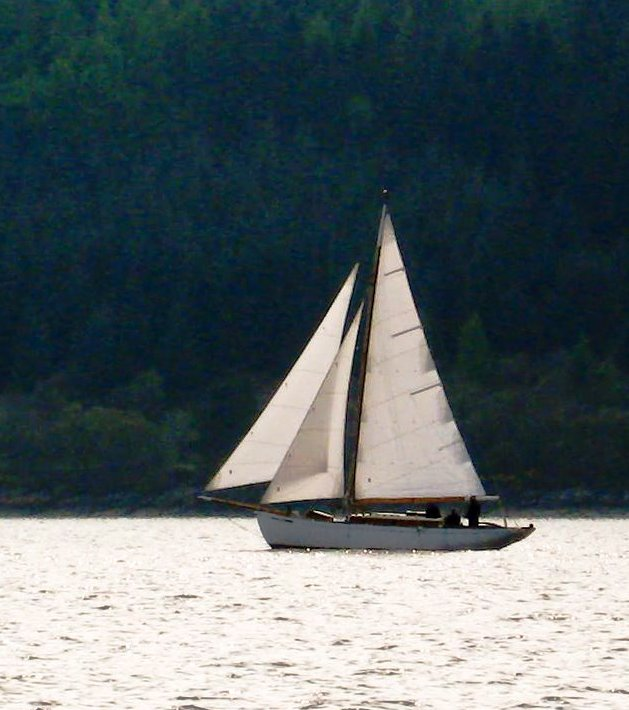
Isonda

Official Lloyd's Number 185994.

Auxiliary cutter with Bermudian rig. Full keel yacht with classic counter stern. 8 tons, 33 ft LOA. Built by Sharp & Brewster of Woodbridge, Suffolk in 1937. Built according to the winning design from the Little Ship Club competition.

Date	Owner	Location
1946	Lt Cmdr Lewis A. OLDRIDGE RNVR & Mrs NM OLDRIDGE	Scarborough? Ref pending.
April 1956	M. CAPE	London
Unknown	Stephen DUNCAN-BROWN	Gampton Creek, River Dart
1980s	Unknown	Gosport
Unknown	Stephen DUNCAN-BROWN	Gampton Creek, River Dart
20 December 1989	Alison Janet DENHAM	Unknown
15 January 1993	Peter MITCHELL	Starcross, River Exe
2002	'A couple'	River Dart
Unknown	Guy COTHAM	Unknown
2003	Donald REID	Edinburgh, Troon Marina
2011	John MACMILLAN	Rhu Marina, River Clyde

=== Keryl ===
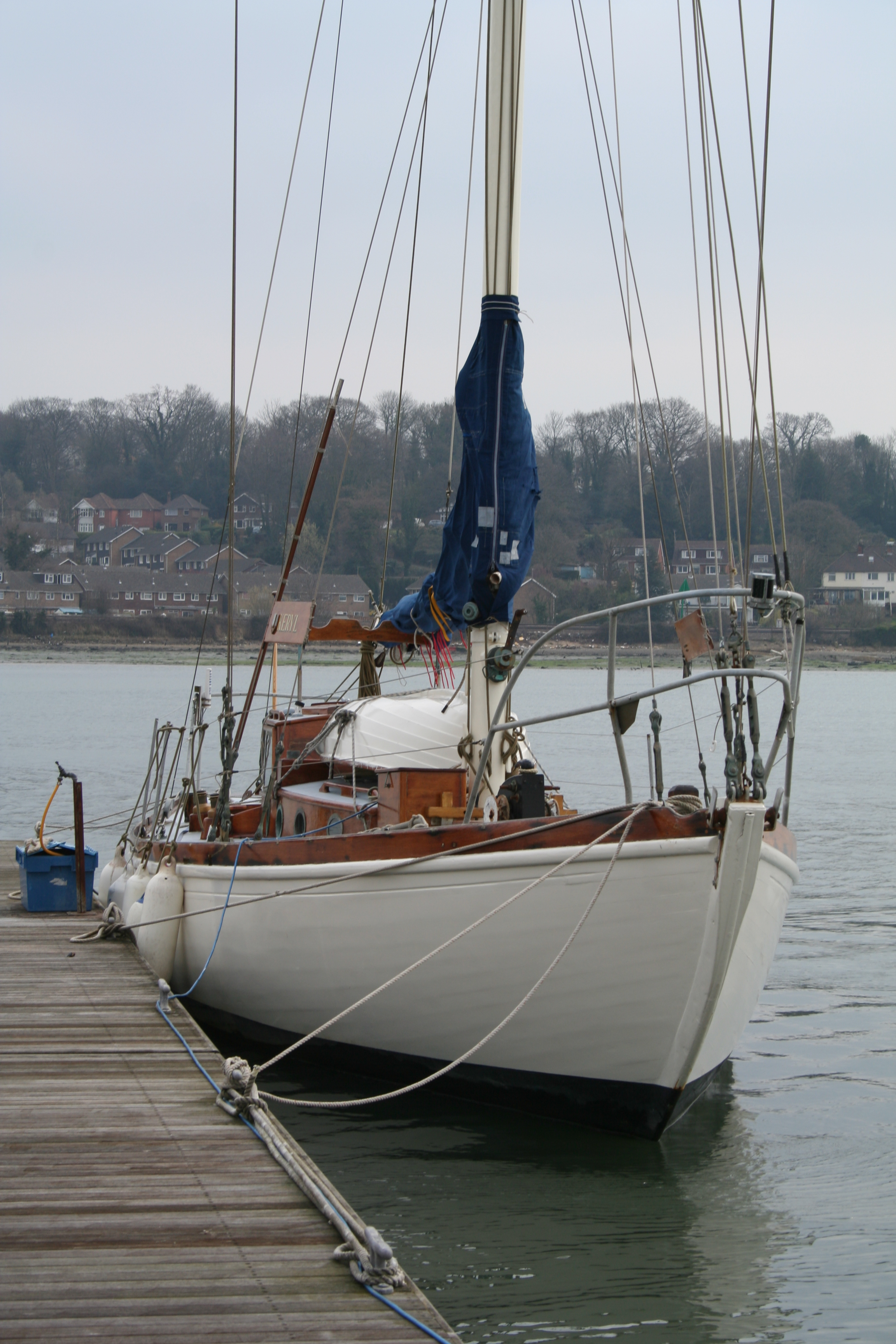
Keryl

Official Lloyd's Number 165038. MVNU (1980)

Auxiliary cutter. 13 tons, 40.3 ft LOA. Built by Harry King & Sons at Pin Mill in 1937.

In 2005 Keryl and her owner, Simon Woodhouse, were the subject of the first two episodes of a TV programme Boat Yard presented by Tom Cunliffe. They were first screened in 2005 on the Discovery Realtime TV channel.

Date	Owner	Notes
1937	Miss Muriel E. WILES	Built, RORC Rating 26.11 ft. Ipswich.
15 May 1937	Miss Muriel E. WILES	Mentioned (along with Foie) in the entry list for the RORC Maas race.
19 May 1937	Miss Muriel E. WILES	Mentioned (along with Foie) as having 'given up' the RORC Maas race.
23 June 1937	Miss Muriel E. WILES	Second place in cruiser class of the RORC Coronation Eddystone race.
20 July 1937	Miss M. E. WILES	Entered and gave up RORC Cowes to Dinard ocean race.
31 July 1937	Miss M. E. WILES	Entered RORC Channel race.
17 August 1937	Miss M. E. WILES	Led the RORC Plymouth to La Baule race.
21 May 1938	Miss M. E. WILES	Mentioned (along with Evarne) in the entry list of The Thames Estuary Race of the Royal Corinthian Y. C. at Burnham.
4 July 1939	Miss M. E. WILES	First place, Division A, Class 1, RORC Southsea to Brixham race.
1939	Miss M. E. WILES	Photographed by Beken & Son of Cowes during Cowes-Dinard Race. Photograph—210. Sail number 160. One of 29 race starters.
1947	Air Comm. B. H. C. and Mrs Muriel E. RUSSELL	Ipswich, RORC Rating 25.49 ft.
1951	R. E. W. WAKEFIELD	Ipswich.
1955	J. R. H. WILLIAMS	Ipswich.
April 1956	J. R. H. WILLIAMS	Ipswich.
1957	Gp Capt. E. T. BEER CBE, and Mrs E. T. BEER	Ipswich.
1966	H. F. P. CLARK	Ipswich, Swanwick Shore. Sail No. 160.
Jan 1976		Mentioned in Cruising World article by Eric Hiscock
1980	H. F. P. CLARK	Ipswich, Swanwick Shore.
23 May 1996	Mr and Mrs M. DIFFEY	From transcript of registry of a British ship.
2005	Simon WOODHOUSE	Subject of Boat Yard
