= Franny Moyle =

British television producer and author (born 1964)

Franny Moyle (born 1964) is a British television producer and author. Her first book Desperate Romantics: The Private Lives of the Pre-Raphaelites (2009) was adapted into the BBC drama serial Desperate Romantics by screenwriter Peter Bowker. Her second book, Constance: The Tragic and Scandalous Life of Mrs. Oscar Wilde was published in 2011 to critical acclaim. In 2016 she released Turner: The Extraordinary Life and Momentous Times of J.M.W. Turner, published by Viking. In 2021, her book, The King's Painter: The Life and Times of Hans Holbein, was published by Abrams Press in New York.

== Career ==
Moyle is a graduate in English and the History of Art from St John's College, Cambridge. She joined BBC television in 1992 as a producer and director initially working predominantly in leisure programming as the editor of magazine programme Home Front. She became the BBC's Creative Director, Arts, running its in-house arts programming production department in London before being appointed the corporation's first dedicated Commissioner for Arts and Culture across its four channels. In 2005, she left a permanent role at the BBC to write and work as a freelance for her own projects. She continues to work as a Director of the Hackney Empire near her home in East London.

She is married to the television director and writer Richard Curson Smith and has three children.
