= Charles Kingsley Adams =

British civil servant

Charles Kingsley Adams CBE FBA
- Adams in December 1964.
- Born: 17 June 1899; Sidcup, Kent, England
- Died: 19 January 1971 (aged 71); London, England
- Known for: Fellow of the Society of Antiquaries

Charles Kingsley Adams, CBE, FBA (17 June 1899 – 19 January 1971) was director, Keeper and Secretary of the National Portrait Gallery from 1951 to 1964

Adams was born in Sidcup, Kent on 17 June 1899, the son of Albert and Annie Adams, his father was a watchmaker. He was commissioned as a 2nd Lieutenant in the East Surrey Regiment during the First World War.

He was made CBE in 1954 and was a Fellow of the Society of Antiquaries. His portrait is held by the NPG

Adams died in London on 19 January 1971.
