= List of places on the Isle of Wight =

Towns on the Isle of Wight

This is a list of towns, villages and hamlets in the county of Isle of Wight, England.

== Towns ==
There are nine main towns, most located along the north and east coasts. Newport is the centrally located county town, with an area population of 25,496. Most settlements link to Newport by road, which is a hub for island services. There are no settlements with city status; the nearest city is Portsmouth, five miles north-east, then Southampton, ten miles north of Cowes.

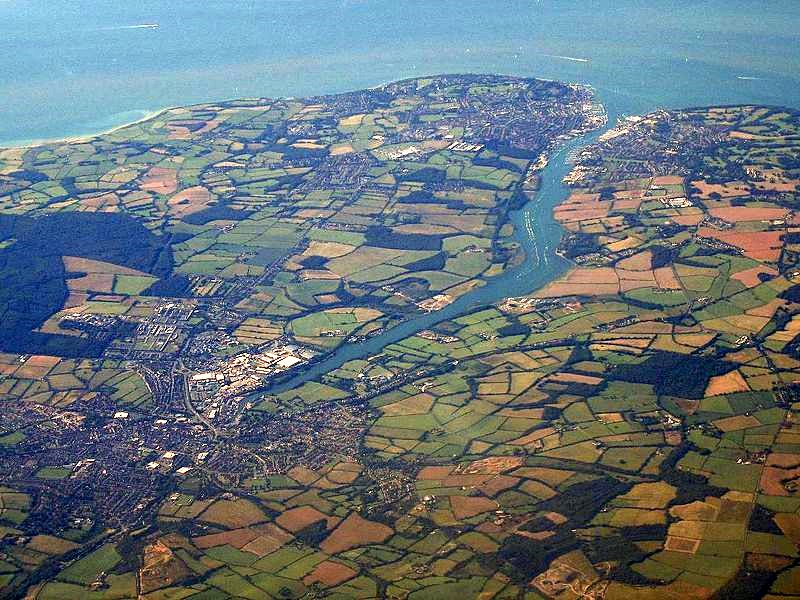
An aerial photograph showing the towns of Newport and Cowes

Town	2011 Population	OS Grid Reference	Post town	Postal code	Photo
Brading	1,800	SZ607870	SANDOWN	PO36	
Cowes	10,405	SZ496962	COWES	PO31	
East Cowes	7,010	SZ502957	EAST COWES	PO32	
Newport	25,496	SZ502893	NEWPORT	PO30	
Ryde	23,999	SZ591923	RYDE	PO33	
Sandown	12,302	SZ600843	SANDOWN	PO36	
Shanklin	9,072	SZ584816	SHANKLIN	PO37	
Ventnor	5,976	SZ562775	VENTNOR	PO38	
Yarmouth	865	SZ356896	YARMOUTH	PO41	

== Villages ==
Name	Civil Parish(es)	Photo
Afton	Freshwater	
Alverstone	Brading Newchurch	
Appley	Ryde	
Arreton	Arreton	
Barton	Newport and Carisbrooke	
Bembridge	Bembridge	
Binstead	Ryde	
Blackwater	Arreton	
Bonchurch	Ventnor	
Brighstone	Brighstone	
Brook	Brighstone	
Calbourne	Calbourne, Newtown and Porchfield	
Carisbrooke	Newport and Carisbrooke	
Chale	Chale	
Chillerton	Chillerton and Gatcombe	
Clatterford	Newport and Carisbrooke	
Cranmore	Shalfleet	
Easton	Freshwater	
Egypt Point	Cowes	
Elmfield	Ryde	
Fishbourne	Fishbourne	
Freshwater	Freshwater	
Gatcombe	Chillerton and Gatcombe	
Godshill	Godshill	
Gunville	Newport and Carisbrooke	
Gurnard	Gurnard	
Havenstreet	Havenstreet and Ashey	
Haylands	Ryde	
Kite Hill	Fishbourne	
Lake	Lake	
Lowtherville	Ventnor	
Mottistone	Brighstone	
Moortown	Brighstone	
Morton	Brading	
Nettlestone	Nettlestone and Seaview	
Newbridge	Shalfleet	
Newchurch	Newchurch	
Newtown	Calbourne, Newtown and Porchfield	
Ningwood	Shalfleet	
Niton	Niton and Whitwell	
Northwood	Northwood	
Norton	Freshwater	
Norton Green	Freshwater	
Oakfield	Ryde	
Osborne	East Cowes	
Pan	Newport and Carisbrooke	
Parkhurst	Newport and Carisbrooke	
Pelhamfield	Ryde	
Pondwell	Nettlestone and Seaview	
Porchfield	Calbourne, Newtown and Porchfield	
Pound Green	Freshwater	
Puckaster	Niton and Whitwell	
Puckpool	Ryde	
Quarr Hill	Ryde	
Rew Street	Gurnard	
Rookley	Rookley	
Sandy Way	Shorwell	
School Green	Freshwater	
Seaview	Nettlestone and Seaview	
Shalfleet	Shalfleet	
Shide	Newport and Carisbrooke	
Shorwell	Shorwell	
Spring Vale	Nettlestone and Seaview	
Staplers	Newport and Carisbrooke	
Steephill	Ventnor	
St Helens	St Helens	
St John's Park	Ryde	
St Lawrence	Ventnor	
Swanmore	Ryde	
Totland	Totland	
Weeks	Ryde	
Whippingham	Whippingham	
Whitwell	Niton and Whitwell	
Winford	Newchurch	
Woodside	Wootton Bridge	
Wootton	Wootton Bridge	
Wootton Bridge	Wootton Bridge	
Wroxall	Wroxall	
Yarbridge	Brading	
Yaverland	Sandown	

== Hamlets and other places ==
Name	Civil Parish(es)	Photo
Adgestone	Brading	
Afton Park	Freshwater	
Alum Bay	Totland	
Alverstone Garden Village	Newchurch	
Apesdown	Newport and Carisbrooke	
Apse Heath	Newchurch	
Ashey	Havenstreet and Ashey	
Atherfield Green	Shorwell	
Bathingbourne	Arreton Godshill	
Berryl	Niton and Whitwell	
Bierley	Niton and Whitwell	
Billingham	Shorwell	
Binfield	Whippingham	
Blackgang	Chale	
Borthwood	Newchurch	
Branstone	Newchurch	
Brookgreen	Brighstone	
Chale Green	Chale	
Chessell	Calbourne, Newtown and Porchfield	
Chilton Green	Brighstone	
Cridmore	Chillerton and Gatcombe	
Cross Lane	Newport and Carisbrooke	
Culver Down	Bembridge	
Dallimores	Whippingham	
Downend	Arreton Havenstreet and Ashey Newport and Carisbrooke	
Dunsbury	Brighstone	
Five Houses	Calbourne, Newtown and Porchfield	
Foreland Fields	Bembridge	
Forest Side	Newport and Carisbrooke	
Freshwater Bay	Freshwater	
Hale Common	Arreton Newchurch	
Hamstead	Shalfleet	
Hillis Corner	Gurnard Northwood	
Hillway	Bembridge	
Horringford	Arreton	
Hulverstone	Brighstone	
Hunny Hill	Newport and Carisbrooke	
Kingates	Niton and Whitwell	
King's Quay	Wootton Bridge Whippingham	
Kingston	Shorwell	
Knighton	Newchurch	
Lane End	Bembridge	
Limerstone	Brighstone Shorwell	
Little Atherfield	Shorwell	
Little Whitehouse	Calbourne, Newtown and Porchfield Newport and Carisbrooke	
Littletown	Havenstreet and Ashey Newport and Carisbrooke	
Locksgreen	Calbourne, Newtown and Porchfield	
Lower Yard	Godshill	
Luccombe	Shanklin	
Mark's Corner	Calbourne, Newtown and Porchfield Newport and Carisbrooke	
Merrie Gardens	Lake	
Mersley	Newchurch	
Nettlecombe	Niton and Whitwell	
Ninham	Newchurch Shanklin	
Ningwood Common	Shalfleet	
Nunwell	Brading	
Merstone	Arreton	
Pallancegate	Newport and Carisbrooke Northwood	
Plaish	Newport and Carisbrooke	
Princelett	Newchurch	
Pyle	Chale	
Queen's Bower	Newchurch	
Rock	Brighstone	
Rookley Green	Rookley	
Roud	Godshill	
Rowridge	Newport and Carisbrooke	
Sandford	Godshill	
Shalcombe	Calbourne, Newtown and Porchfield Shalfleet	
Southford	Niton and Whitwell	
Springhill	East Cowes	
Steyne Cross	Bembridge	
Thorncross	Brighstone	
Upton	Havenstreet and Ashey Ryde	
Vittlefields	Newport and Carisbrooke	
Whiteley Bank	Newchurch Wroxall	
Yafford	Shorwell	

== Chines ==
Name	Photo
Alum Bay Chine	
Barnes Chine	
Blackgang Chine (destroyed)	
Brambles Chine	
Brook Chine	
Chilton Chine	
Churchill Chine	
Colwell Chine (destroyed)	
Compton Chine	
Cowleaze Chine	
Grange Chine and Marsh Chine	
Ladder Chine (dry)	
Linstone Chine	
Luccombe Chine	
New Chine	
Shanklin Chine	
Shepherd's Chine	
Shippards Chine	
Small Hope Chine (destroyed)	
Old and New Walpen Chine	
Whale Chine	
Widdick Chine	

== Rivers, streams and brooks ==
- Atherfield Brook
- Atkies Stream
- Barnfields Stream
- Binstead Stream
- Blackbridge Brook
- Brighstone Brook
- Brook Stream
- Buddle Brook
- Bugle Stream
- Carpenters Lake
- Caul Bourne
- Causeway Lake
- Chillingwood Brook
- Clamerkin Brook
- Clamerkin Lake
- Claybrook Luck
- Corf Lake
- Deadman's Brook
- Dodnor Creek
- Dungewood Brook
- Eastern Yar
- Fairlee Hole
- Great Luck
- Gunville Stream
- Gurnard Luck
- Holbrookes Stream
- King's Quay
- Little Thorness Stream
- Lower Knighton Brook
- Lukely Brook
- Lucketts Brook
- Medina River
- Merstone Stream
- Monktonmead Brook
- Newtown Brook
- Newtown River
- Ningwood Brook
- Ningwood Lake
- Palmer's Brook
- Pan Stream
- Parkhurst Stream
- Pell Stream
- Rodge Brook
- Scotchell's Brook
- Shalfleet Lake
- Shorwell Stream
- Springvale Brook
- Spur Lake
- Staplers Stream
- The Brook
- The Old Mill Pond
- The Run
- The Solent (former)
- The Source
- Thorley Brook
- Vicarage Lane Drain
- Western Haven
- Wroxall Stream
- Western Yar
- Wootton Creek

== See also ==
- List of United Kingdom locations
- List of Sites of Special Scientific Interest on the Isle of Wight
- List of places in England
