= Monktonmead Brook =

Coordinates: 50.71536°N 1.15972°W

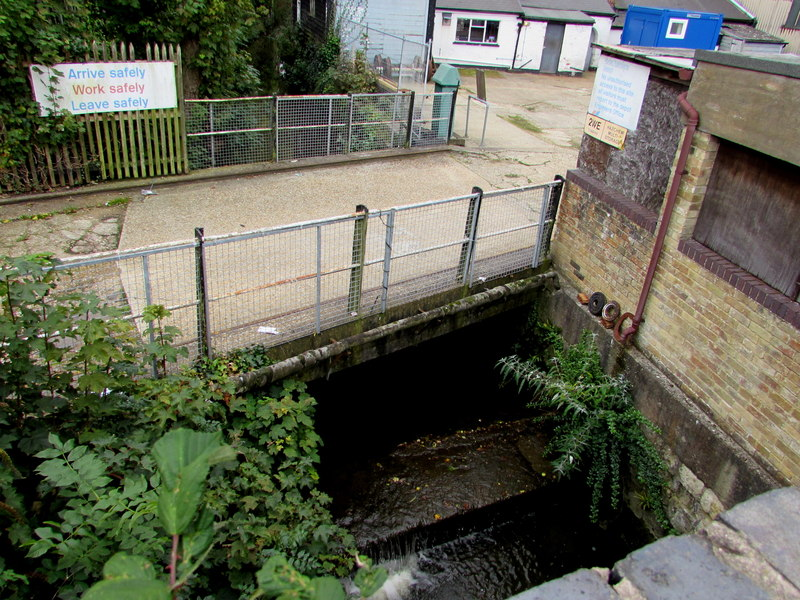
- A bridge or culvert over Monktonmead Brook at Ryde
- Etymology: 'The meadow of the monks'

Location
- Country: United Kingdom
- County: Isle of Wight

Physical characteristics
- Source
  - location: Eaglehead and Bloodstone Copses
- Mouth: Ryde
- Length: 6.6 km (4.1 mi)

Monktonmead Brook is a small river on the Isle of Wight. Its water quality was classed as moderate. It flows from the chalk downland Ashey Down through meadows, farmland and various woodlands and drains out into the sea at Ryde via a concrete outfall. It used to have a wide river mouth before being canalised and pumped underground during after the construction of the esplanade and Cornwall Street.

== Name ==
It was named from Monken Mead ('the meadow of the monks'), from Old English munuc (with the old dialectal plural form -en) and mǣd. In 1215, it was referred to as 'The meadow of Prestitun (i.e. Preston)', when it belonged to the monks of Quarr Abbey.

It was earlier called Smalbroke (with the same origin as Smallbrook Farm), from Old English smæl and brōc, meaning 'the narrow brook'.

== Course ==
It arises from a group of springs at the foot of Ashey Down within the Eaglehead and Bloodstone Copses SSSI, near Ashey.

The name of Bloodstone Copse may be from Monktonmead Brook's source, from the supposed red-colour of the spring and stones within it, probably causes be algae.

It mostly flows through agricultural areas, with it being the medieval parish borders of Newchurch, Brading and St Helens, with only small modifications. In these areas they it is heavily maintained from springs at the foot of the chalk downs, with it being covered with bushes and scrub.

Towards Whitefield Farm it meanders through the ancient woodland of Swanpond Copse. The Isle of Wight Steam Railway follows its course from there to Ryde. The flood plain of the brook has created a rich variety of habitats, even though it is heading towards an urban area.

It remains heavily wooded until the outskirts of Ryde, where it flows by and through allotment gardens, groves and copses of secondary woodland and areas of waste-land. It enters an urban area at Oakfield, Ryde, where it flows along a concrete-lined tunnel through business parks and residential areas.

North of Simeon Street, the brook disappears and is pumped through Ryde, emerging in a concrete outfall in Ryde Harbour.

== History ==
In 1864, a horse-drawn tram service in Ryde was introduced. The route avoided streets where the river passed underneath, so to not damage the road. The tram company bought three houses and ran the tracks through their back gardens. They also created a tunnel.

The 1866 Ordnance Survey map shows the brook splitting into two south of St John's Road Station to go around the station, and two small brooks feed into the river from uncultivated marshland east of the town. Upstream a sluice gate is also shown on the map.

Flooding of residential areas and railway lines can occur when heavy rainfall and high tides cause it to flow back into the town as it is unable to empty into the sea. The most severe flood occurred in December 1999. There were 4 floods between June 1999 and November 2000.

== See also ==
- List of places on the Isle of Wight
- River engineering
