= List of estuaries of England =

The following is a list of estuaries in England:

- Adur Estuary
- Alde and Ore Estuary
- Alnmouth Estuary
- Alt Estuary
- Arun Estuary
- Avon Estuary
- Axe Estuary
- Beaulieu River
- Blackwater Estuary
- Blue Anchor Bay
- Blyth Estuary
- Breydon Water
- Bridgwater Bay
- Camel Estuary
- Carrick Roads
- Chichester Harbour
- Christchurch Harbour
- Colne Estuary
- Coquet Estuary
- Crouch-Roach Estuary
- Cuckmere Estuary
- Dart Estuary
- Deben Estuary
- Dee Estuary
- Dengie Flats
- Duddon Estuary
- Eastern Yar
- Erme Estuary
- Esk Estuary
- Exe Estuary
- Fal Estuary
- Fowey Estuary
- Gannel Estuary
- Hamford Water
- Hayle Estuary
- Helford Estuary
- Humber Estuary
- Inner Solway Estuary
- Inner Thames Estuary
- Langstone Harbour
- Lindisfarne & Budle Bay
- Looe Estuary
- Lymington Estuary
- Maplin Sands
- Medina River
- Medway Estuary
- Mersey Estuary
- Morecambe Bay
- Newtown River
- North Norfolk Estuary
- Ore / Alde / Butley Estuary
- Orwell Estuary
- Otter Estuary
- Oulton Broad
- Ouse Estuary
- Pagham Harbour
- Pegwell Bay
- Plymouth Sound
- Poole Harbour
- Portsmouth Harbour
- Ribble Estuary
- Rother Estuary
- Salcombe and Kingsbridge Estuary
- Severn Estuary
- Southampton Water
- Stour Estuary
- Taw-Torridge Estuary
- Tees Estuary
- Teign Estuary
- Thames Estuary
- The Fleet and Portland Harbour
- The Swale
- The Wash
- Tweed Estuary
- Tyne Estuary
- Wansbeck Estuary
- Wear Estuary
- Western Yar
- Wootton Creek
- Wye Estuary
- Yealm Estuary
