= Earl Mountbatten Hospice =

The Earl Mountbatten Hospice is the only hospice on the Isle of Wight and lead provider of palliative care. It cares for people suffering from or affected by life-shortening illnesses and provides help and advice for their families, friends and carers.

The Kissypuppy charity founded by Aaron Rolf and Gemma Blamire has ensured the hospice now has facilities for dying children and facilitates visits from schools, to help remove the taboos around dying.

== See also ==
- St Mary's Hospital, Isle of Wight
- Isle of Wight NHS Trust
