= Queen's Bower =

Hamlet on the Isle of Wight, England

Coordinates: 50°39′33″N 1°11′52″W

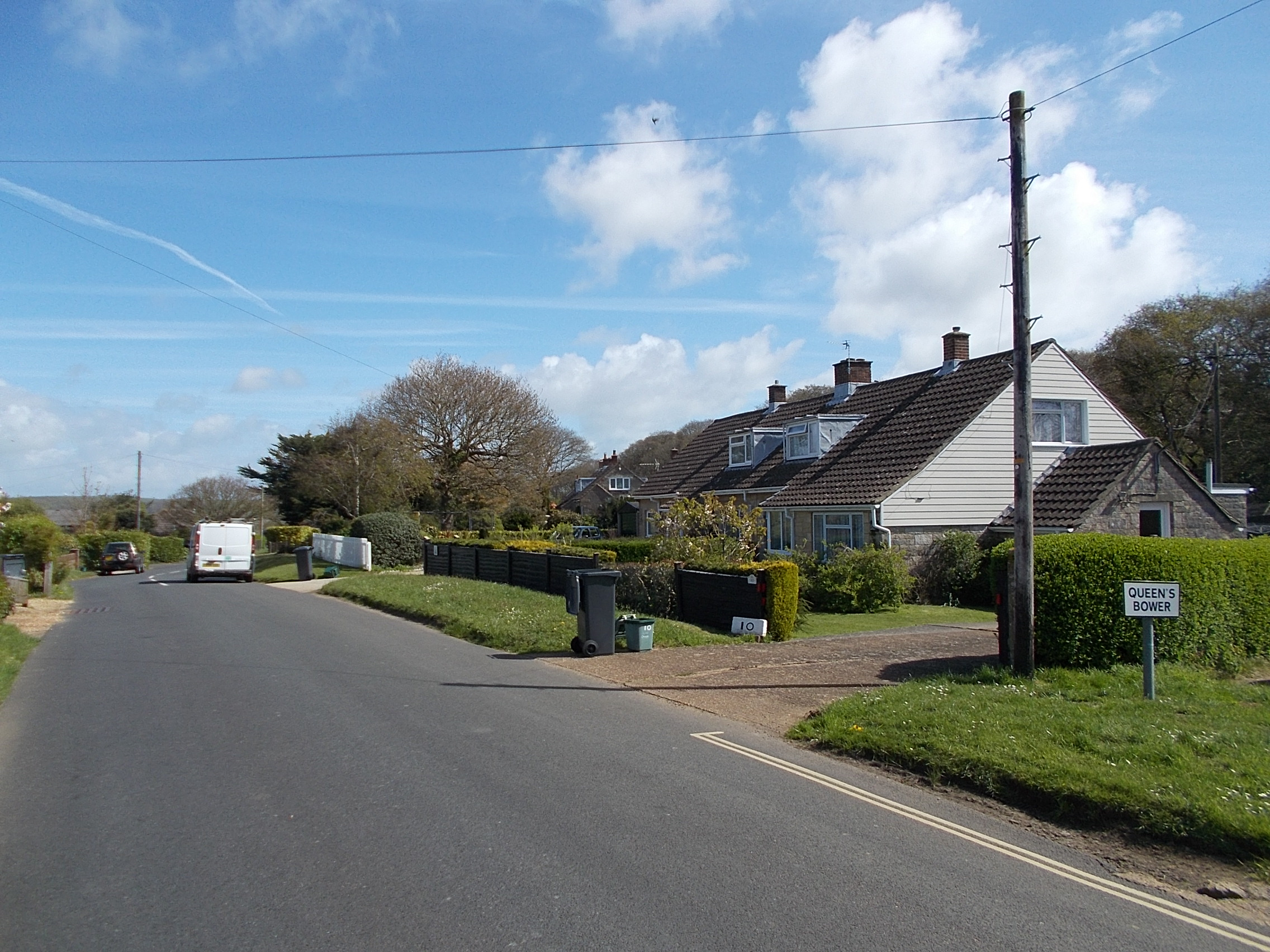
Alverstone Road, Queen's Bower

Queen's Bower (or Queen Bower) is a hamlet on the Isle of Wight, England that has effectively merged with Winford and Apse Heath to create a village. It is classed as part of Sandown, with the postcode PO36. It is in the civil parish of Newchurch, Isle of Wight. Transport is provided by Southern Vectis bus route 8 to Sandown, which stops at Hairpin Bend on Alverstone Road once every hour throughout the day, which is right on the perimeter of Borthwood Copse.

It lies to the north of Borthwood, a National Trust property, and gets its name from a hunting lodge for hunting deer in Borthwood, owned in the 13th century either by Isabella de Fortibus — last "Queen" of the Isle of Wight, or King Edward I's queen after he took over the Island. Although somewhere along the line between then and the present, the name has become lost in translation as it is believed to have been originally known as 'Queen Dower' as the land was passed down to her.

The only commercial property in the area is the Queen Bower Dairy which is also a caravan park. The National Trust site of Borthwood Copse, which was originally a royal hunting ground is nearby. The area is also home to the 'Isle of Wight Cheese Company' which gets its milk from the dairy farm.

Alongside Alverstone and other nearby settlements, Queen's Bower is one of the locations on the Isle of Wight where red squirrels can often be found.
