= Ningwood =

Village on the Isle of Wight, England

Coordinates: 50.700°N 1.440°W

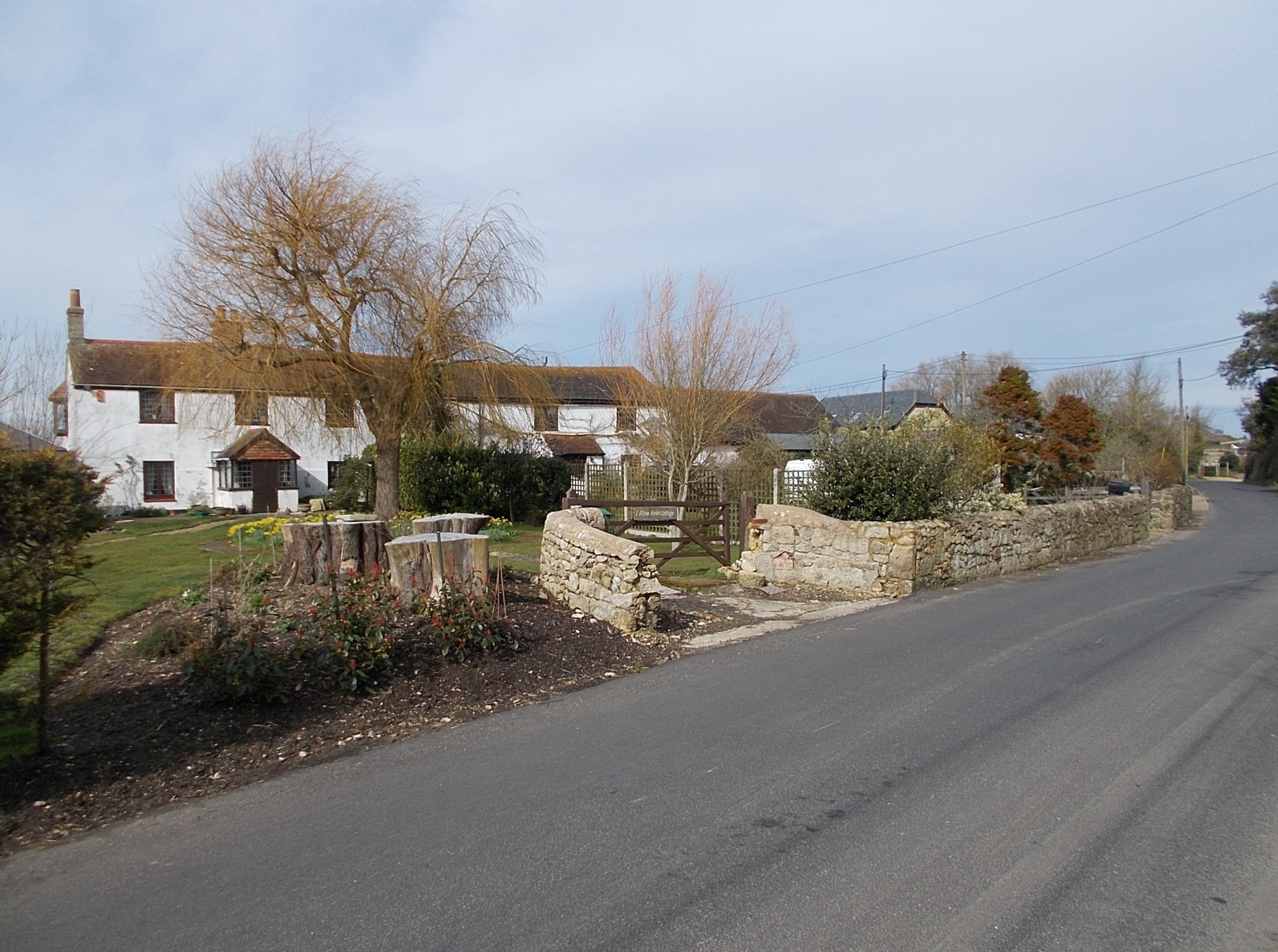
- Station Road, Ningwood

- Location within the Isle of Wight
- OS grid reference: SZ415895
- Unitary authority: Isle of Wight
- Ceremonial county: Isle of Wight
- Region: South East
- Country: England
- Sovereign state: United Kingdom
- Post town: NEWPORT
- Postcode district: PO30
- Dialling code: 01983
- Police: Hampshire and Isle of Wight
- Fire: Hampshire and Isle of Wight
- Ambulance: Isle of Wight
- UK Parliament: Isle of Wight West

Ningwood is a village on the Isle of Wight. It is on several lanes about three miles east of Yarmouth in the northwest of the island. In the 2011 Census the population of the village was included in the civil parish of Shalfleet.

== History ==
=== Name ===
Ningwood lies at the meeting point of an area of woodland to the north and a long-established area of arable and livestock farms to the south. Its name is of Anglo-Saxon origin and means "[land] taken from the wood". In the Domesday book of 1086 it was referred to as Lenimcode, which has the same meaning, but in the older Celtic language, Brythonic.

=== Medieval history ===
In 1086, Ningwood appeared in the Domesday book as part of the Hundred of Hemreswel, one of three hundreds of the Isle of Wight. Hemsreswel included the settlements of Yarmouth, Lenimcode, and Soet. At the time, Ningwood was held directly from King William the Conqueror by a person called Gerin.

By 1100, Ningwood had passed into the ownership of the king of England and it was held at one point by Richard de Redvers, who died in 1107.

In 1125, the manor of Ningwood was given to Christchurch Priory, then known as Twynham Priory, by clerk Peter de Oglander. Oglander was subsequently appointed dean of the priory and regained the rights to the manor along with a number of others.

Following the dissolution of Christchurch Priory in 1539, Ningwood Manor came into the possession of King Henry VIII. In 1544 it was granted to Thomas Hobson, from Lincolnshire, in return for the manor of Marylebone in Middlesex. The Hobsons were to settle in Ningwood and became a prominent family in the Isle of Wight for the following hundred years.

=== Early modern history ===
In 1618 the Oglander family was still recorded as owning land in the area, being in possession of the Horse and Groom public house in Ningwood, as well as property in neighbouring Shalfleet.

In 1627 John Hobson, or Hopson, of Ningwood was given a military appointment "to have charge and leading of the company of Ningwood as their captain." His wife, Lady Margaret Ley, was daughter of James Ley, Earl of Marlborough. She was a friend of the republican poet John Milton, who frequently visited the couple and who addressed her in his sonnet number ten, "Daughter to that Good Earl" (1644).

In the late 18th century, Ningwood was sold by the Miller Family to John Pinhorn, who built the main extant part of Ningwood Manor in around 1784. According to the Historic England listing of the manor house, Pinhorn was a native of Newport and worked as a banker in London.

=== Modern history ===
The celebrated architect John Nash (1752-1835), designer of London's Regent Street, was a landowner in Ningwood and neighbouring areas in the early 19th century. Nash redesigned the nearby Hamstead Farm, part of the Hamstead Estate, in 1806 for his own use. He subsequently purchased Ningwood House, now the grade II listed Ningwood Manor.

Well-known island brickmakers, the Prichett family, established a brick yard in Ningwood in the 19th century.

The Ningwood Bible Christian (Methodist) Bethesda Chapel opened in 1847 and was the only religious building in the village. It was demolished following its sale in 1939.

In 1849, John Nash's widow transferred a parcel of land in Ningwood to the minister and churchwarden of the parish of Shalfleet for the construction of a school in the village. The school was rebuilt in 1870 and further enlarged in 1905. In 1911, the school was referred to as Ningwood Elementary, and had an average attendance of 106. The school has equally often been known as Shalfleet, as it serves both settlements.

Between 1851 and 1891 the population of Ningwood remained steady, changing from 153 to 151.

In 1949, Calbourne School and Locks Green School both closed and their pupils transferred to Ningwood/Shalfleet School.

== Geography ==
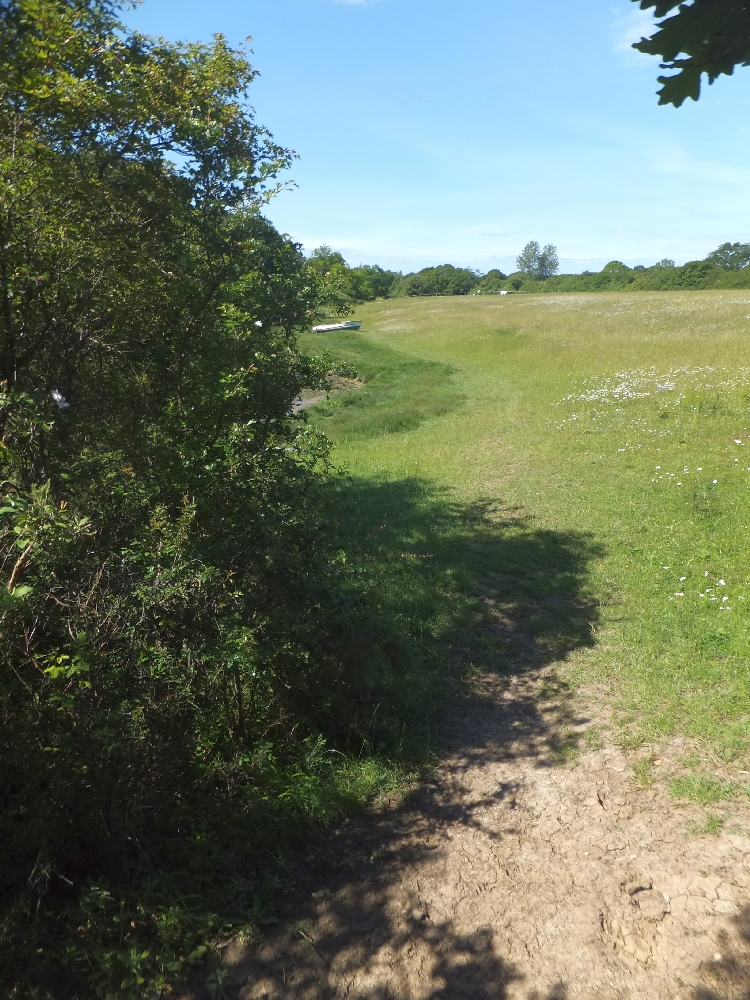
Footpath on north bank of Ningwood Lake - geograph.org.uk - 3045482

Ningwood is bordered to the north by Ningwood Lake, one of the tidal inlets in the northwest of the Isle of Wight known locally as lakes. Ningwood Lake is one of five main tributaries of the Newtown River, alongside Shalfleet Lake, Corf Lake, Causeway Lake, and Clamerkin Lake.

Ningwood Common nature reserve is located at the northwestern edge of the settlement, adjoining the neighbouring community of Cranmore.

== Amenities ==
The Horse and Groom Pub is a prominent establishment in Ningwood. The building was first recorded in 1618.

The former Ningwood School, located on Station Road, Ningwood, is now known as Shalfleet Primary School, after the nearby village of Shalfleet. Since 2010, Shalfleet Primary has been part of the Federation of Church Schools of Shalfleet and Freshwater & Yarmouth, under a single governing body and head teacher.

Many of the amenities used by Ningwood's residents, are in neighbouring Shalfleet, including the Church of St Michael the Archangel, the New Inn public house, and the only local shop.

== Transport ==
Ningwood is linked to other parts of the Island by Southern Vectis bus route 7, serving Freshwater, Yarmouth and Newport and intermediate settlements.

It was served between 1888 and 1953 by Ningwood railway station, at the southern edge of the settlement. The station was part of the Freshwater, Yarmouth and Newport Railway, built to connect the west of the island to the capital, Newport.

The Hamstead Trail runs along the western side of Ningwood, connecting Hamstead Point on the Solent in the northern coast of the island to Brook Down and Brook Bay on the southern coast.

The Isle of Wight coastal path crosses Ningwood Lake, just to the east of the settlement.

== Notable people ==
- Richard de Redvers (died 1107) – Norman Baron
- John Milton – English poet
- John Nash – Regency architect
