= Hamstead, Isle of Wight =

Coordinates: 50°42′30″N 1°26′16″W

Hamstead
- Hamlet
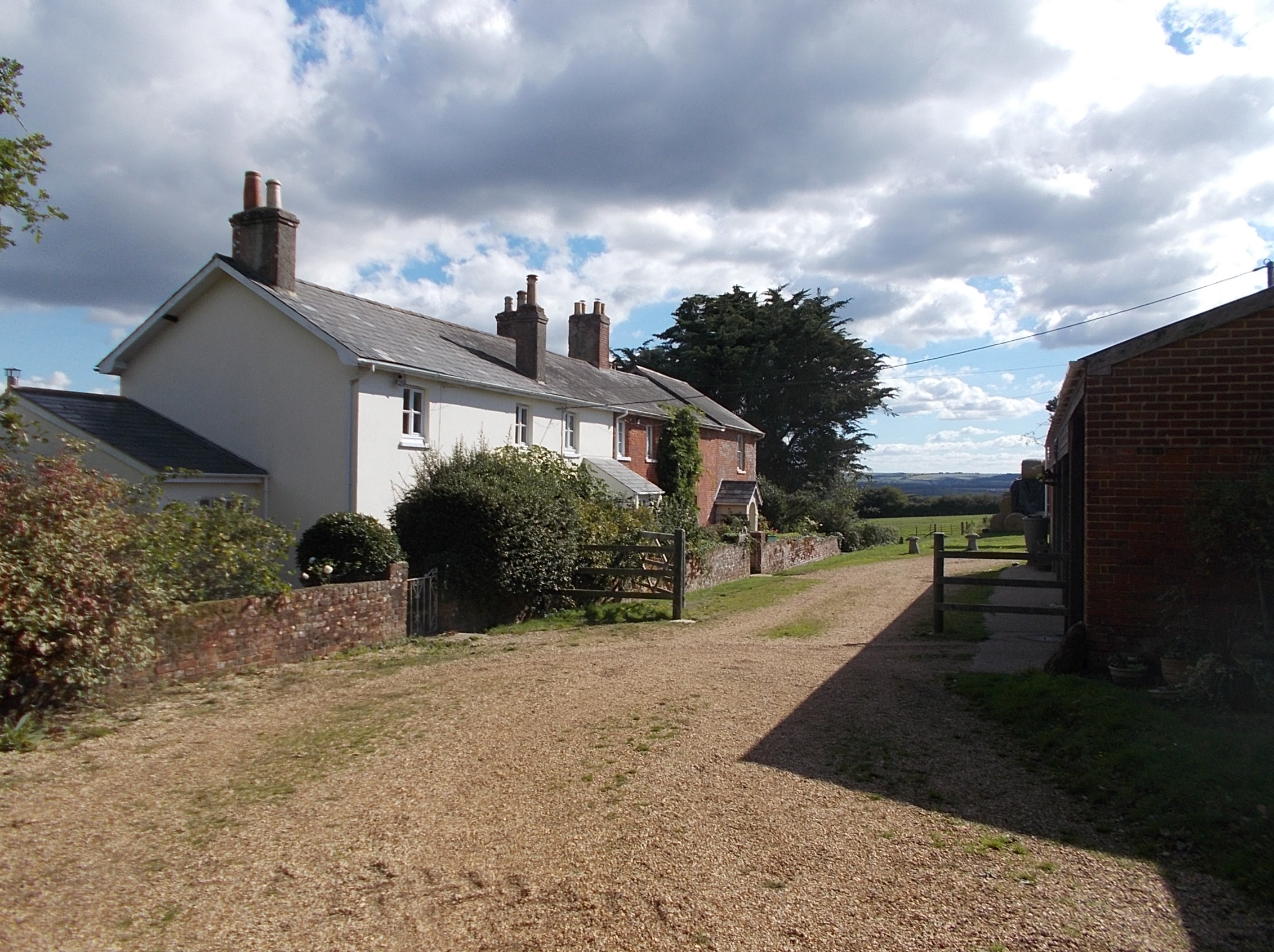
- A row of cottages near Hamstead Farm

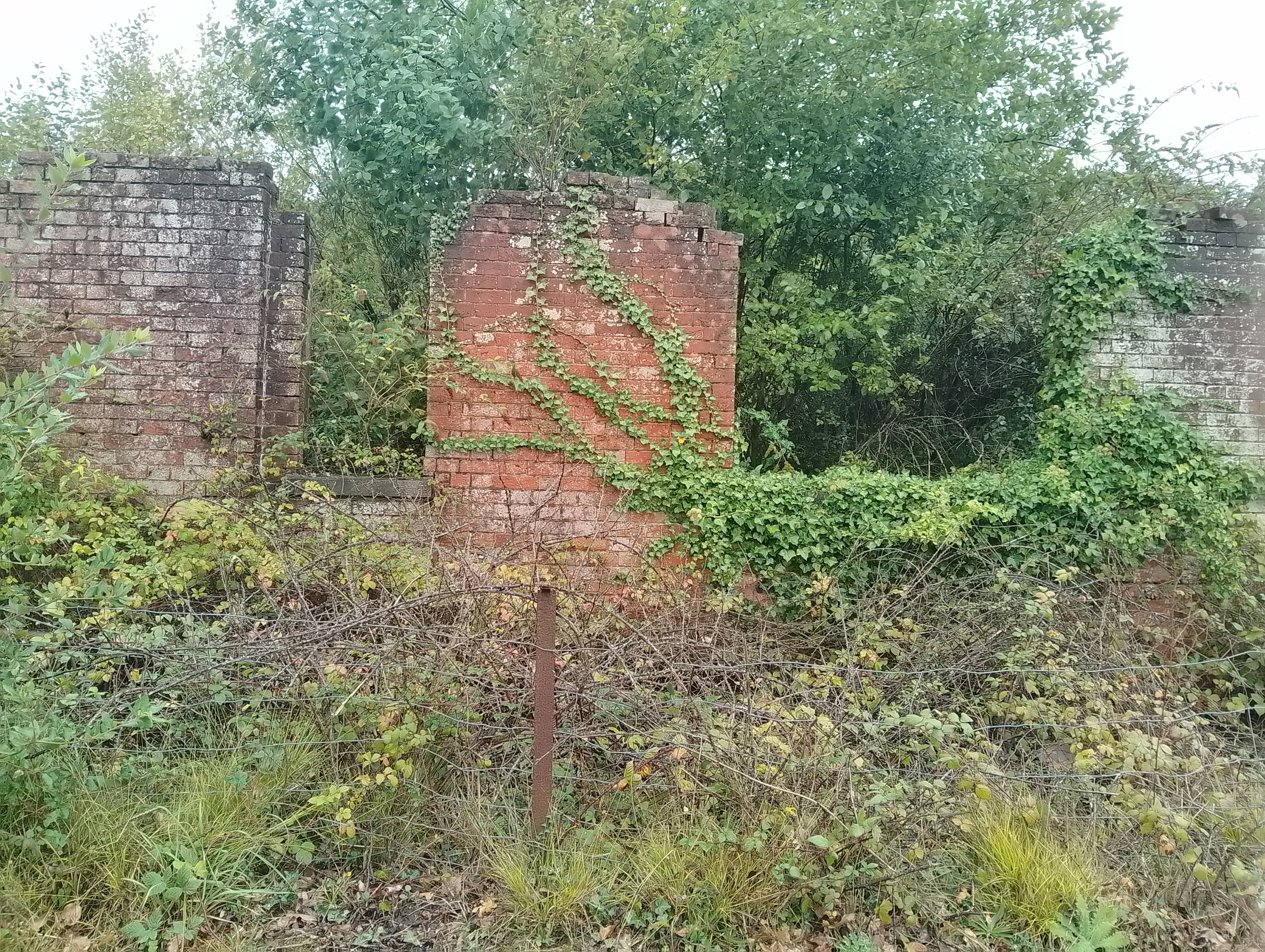
- An abandoned building in Hamstead

- Location within the Isle of Wight
- OS grid reference: SZ3994591282
- Civil parish: Shalfleet
- Unitary authority: Isle of Wight
- Ceremonial county: Isle of Wight
- Region: South East
- Country: England
- Sovereign state: United Kingdom
- Post town: Yarmouth
- Postcode district: PO
- Police: Hampshire and Isle of Wight
- Fire: Hampshire and Isle of Wight
- Ambulance: Isle of Wight

Hamstead is a small rural settlement in the civil parish of Shalfleet, on the Isle of Wight. It is located about three miles east of Yarmouth, in the northwest of the island, between the settlements of Cranmore in the east, Ningwood to the south, and the Newtown River to the east. The northern edge of Hamstead on the Solent forms the centre of the Hamstead Heritage Coast.

== Name ==
The name means 'homestead, site of a dwelling' from Old English hām-stede. The name also occurs in other counties, and the similar spelling Hampstead.

1086 (Domesday Book): Hamestede

1160–1161: Hamested

1291: Hamstede

1327: Hampstede

1769: (East) Hampstead

== History ==
At the Domesday Book, it had a population of 2 villagers and 2 smallholders, and it had a value of 1 pound in 1066 and 1086. It had 1 ploughland. In 1086, its tenant-in-chief was William son of Azur and its lord was Nigel. Its lord in 1066 was Aelfric (Small).

In the medieval times, there was a grange belonging to Quarr Abbey there.

The celebrated architect John Nash (1752–1835), designer of London’s Regent Street, was a landowner in Hamstead and neighbouring areas in the early 19th century. Nash redesigned Hamstead Farm, part of the Hamstead Estate, in 1806 for his own use.

In 1832, Nash built the Hamstead Tramway, which was the first railway on the Isle of Wight. This horse-drawn tramway connected Hamstead Quay on Newtown River with Nash’s property Hamstead House. The tramway supplied goods to the estate. It had ceased operations by 1860.

During World War II, Hamstead was the site of support infrastructure for the Western Solent anti-submarine boom. The barrier ran from Hamstead Point to Sowley on the mainland, and supported nets to create a physical barrier to submarines attempting to enter Southampton Water from the west. A concrete ramp used for the boom is still visible next to Hamstead Ledge.

In 1959, the Central Electricity Generating Board proposed the construction of a nuclear power station at Hamstead Farm. The proposal was opposed and blocked by the Solent Protection Society.

== Walking ==
The Hamstead Trail starts in the settlement, connecting Hamstead Point on the Solent in the northern coast of the island to Brook Down and Brook Bay on the southern coast.

The Isle of Wight Coastal Path passes through Hamstead between Newtown and Yarmouth.
