= Princelet Manor =

Manor house on Isle of Wight

Princelet Manor (also Premsloud, Prymesflode, Prynslode, Princelade), is a manor house on the Isle of Wight, situated in the Newchurch parish. It a small holding to the south-west of Apse Heath, and was held by the Lisles of Wootton. Of them it was held by the Kingstons of Kingston until the middle of the 14th century. It was held in 1428 by Richard Hearn and John Mayhew. Princelet was purchased at the end of the 16th century by Richard Gard, who in 1617 left an annuity issuing out of it to the poor of Newchurch. In 1780 John White paid a fee-farm rent for it, but in 1837 it was owned by William Thatcher; the owner as of 1912 was Mr. Charles Allen.
