= King's Quay, Isle of Wight =

Place in the Isle of Wight, England

King's Quay Shore
- Site of Special Scientific Interest
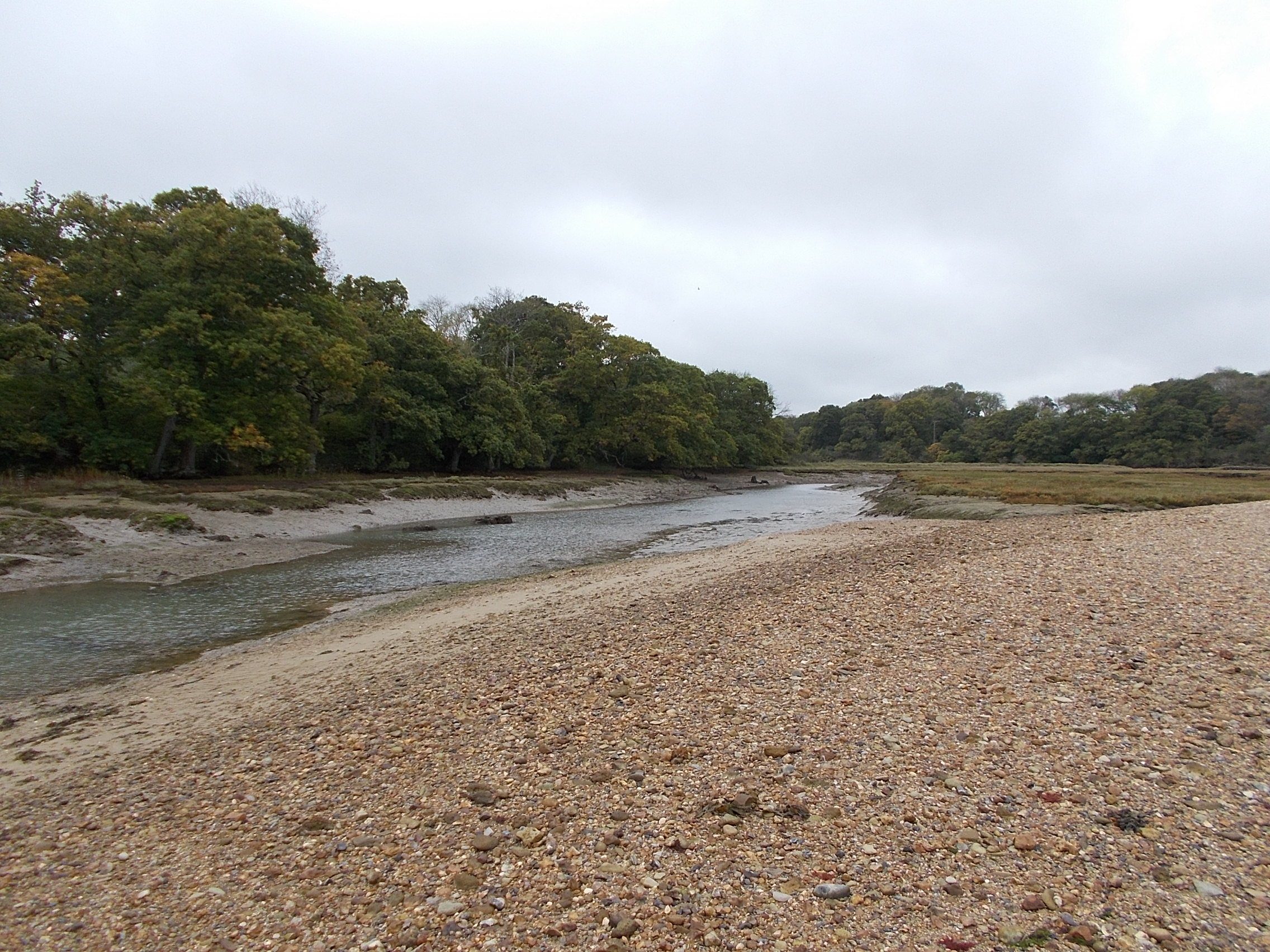
- Location of King's Quay Shore.
- Area of search: Isle of Wight
- Grid reference: SZ536935
- Interest: Biological and Geological
- Area: 97.2 ha (240 acres)
- Notification date: 1951
- Location map: Natural England

King's Quay is a place on the north east coast of the Isle of Wight, an island off the South Coast of England. It comprises the estuary of a stream called Palmer's Brook, situated between East Cowes and Wootton Creek, about 2 miles (3.2 km) north west of Wootton. It is said, probably apocryphally, to have been the place that King John fled to after signing Magna Carta, from which it derives its name.

It is private land, part of the 500-acre (2.0 km^{2}) Barton Estate, and is a Site of Special Scientific Interest and Ramsar site. It is rich in fossils, particularly of oligocene fish and mesolithic artifacts in a rocky outcrop known as the Osborne Beds. It comprises an area of saltmarsh, sand and marsh, bounded by ancient woodlands at Wallhill Copse, Curlew Copse, Woodhouse Copse and Brickhill Copse.

The Quay is a causeway which is breached in one place leading to a stone bridge. During the Middle Ages, King's Quay and the adjoining Meads Hole to the north in Osborne Bay was the site of a market of stolen goods, the plunder of Isle of Wight pirates upon French and Spanish shipping. It is inaccessible to the public, but can be approached from the south western end by Forestry Commission land at Woodhouse Copse.

== See also ==
- List of places on the Isle of Wight
