= Haylands =

Coordinates: 50.717899°N 1.174547°W

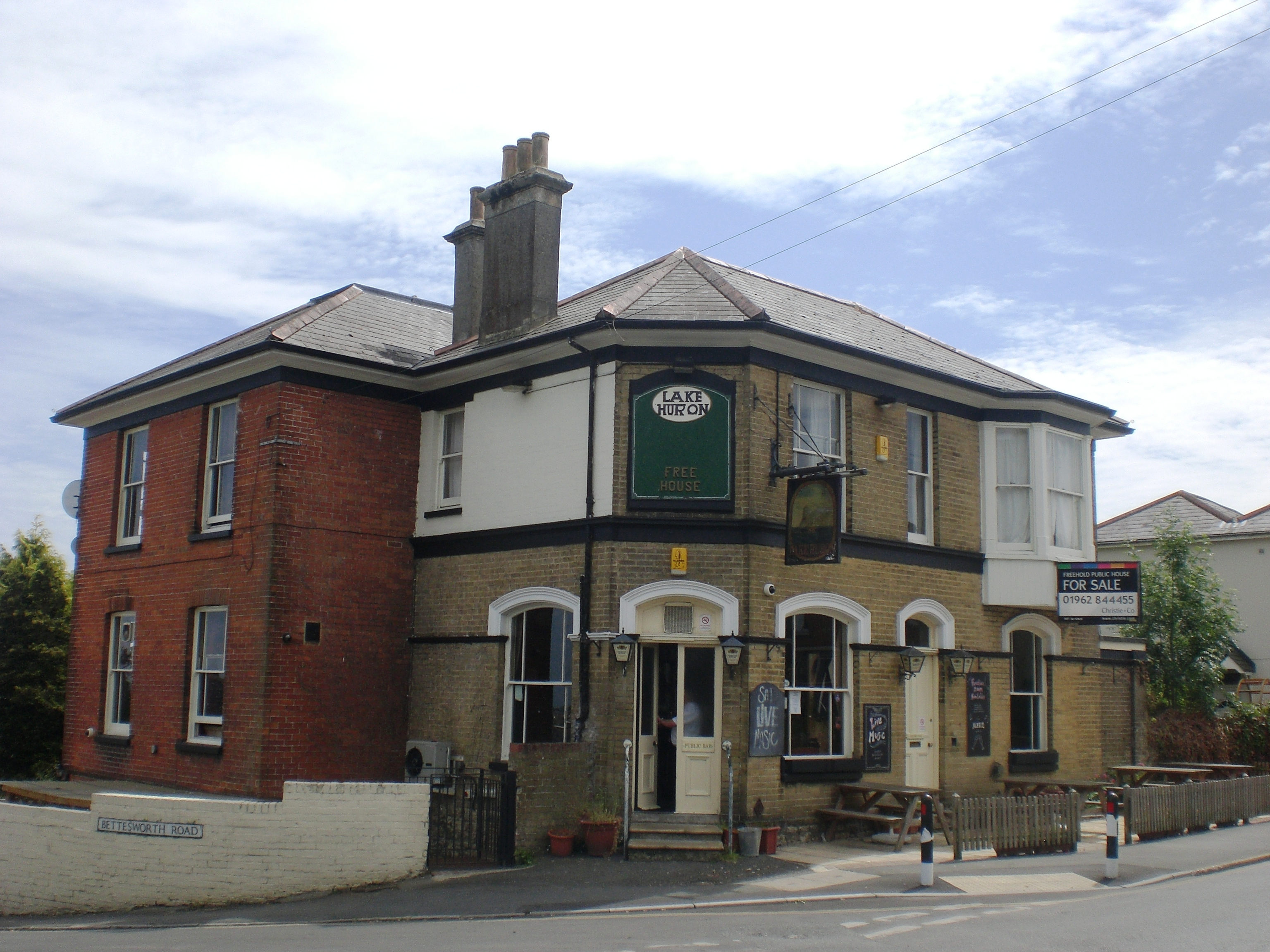
- The Lake Huron pub.

- Location within the Isle of Wight
- OS grid reference: SZ579911
- Unitary authority: Isle of Wight
- Ceremonial county: Isle of Wight
- Region: South East
- Country: England
- Sovereign state: United Kingdom
- Post town: RYDE
- Postcode district: PO33
- Dialling code: 01983
- Police: Hampshire and Isle of Wight
- Fire: Hampshire and Isle of Wight
- Ambulance: Isle of Wight
- UK Parliament: Isle of Wight East

Haylands is an area just to the south of Ryde on the Isle of Wight, off the south coast of England. At the time of the 2021 Census the population etc. of Haylands is listed under Haylands and Swanmore. Located to the east, it is a short walk away from housing estates at Pell and Binstead. It previously comprised three small settlements called Great, Lower and Upper Island, which are older forms of the modern name.

== Name ==
The name probably means 'enclosed pieces of land', from Old English hæg and land.

1559-1560: Hillands

1769: Great, Lower and Upper Islands

1771: Hayland's

1884: Haylands

== Amenities ==
The settlement consists mainly of a housing development, including some ex-local authority housing, a corner shop in Upton Road, and a primary school. It is not far from Ryde Academy at Pell Lane.

In the centre of Haylands there is a pub called Lake Huron. The pub's name originates from the Lake family, a 19th-century family of brewers who owned several pubs naming them after the Great Lakes of North America, Lake Huron is the only one to have survived.

== Location ==
Haylands forms part of the local electoral ward of Havenstreet, Ashey and Haylands and at the Isle of Wight Council election in 2009 elected Independent councillor Vanessa Churchman. In local elections held in 2026, Les Kirby replaced Vanessa Churchman as councillor.

The settlement lies to the west of the A3055 road. Haylands is approximately 5.5 miles (8.9 km) north-east of Newport. Southern Vectis route 4 used to link the area with Ryde and East Cowes. However this caused the journey time to increase significantly and the area was later withdrawn from the service and after negotiations a limited replacement service was put in place. This service was later improved and is now run as route 37.
