= St Mary's Hospital, Isle of Wight =

St Mary's Hospital
- Isle of Wight NHS Trust
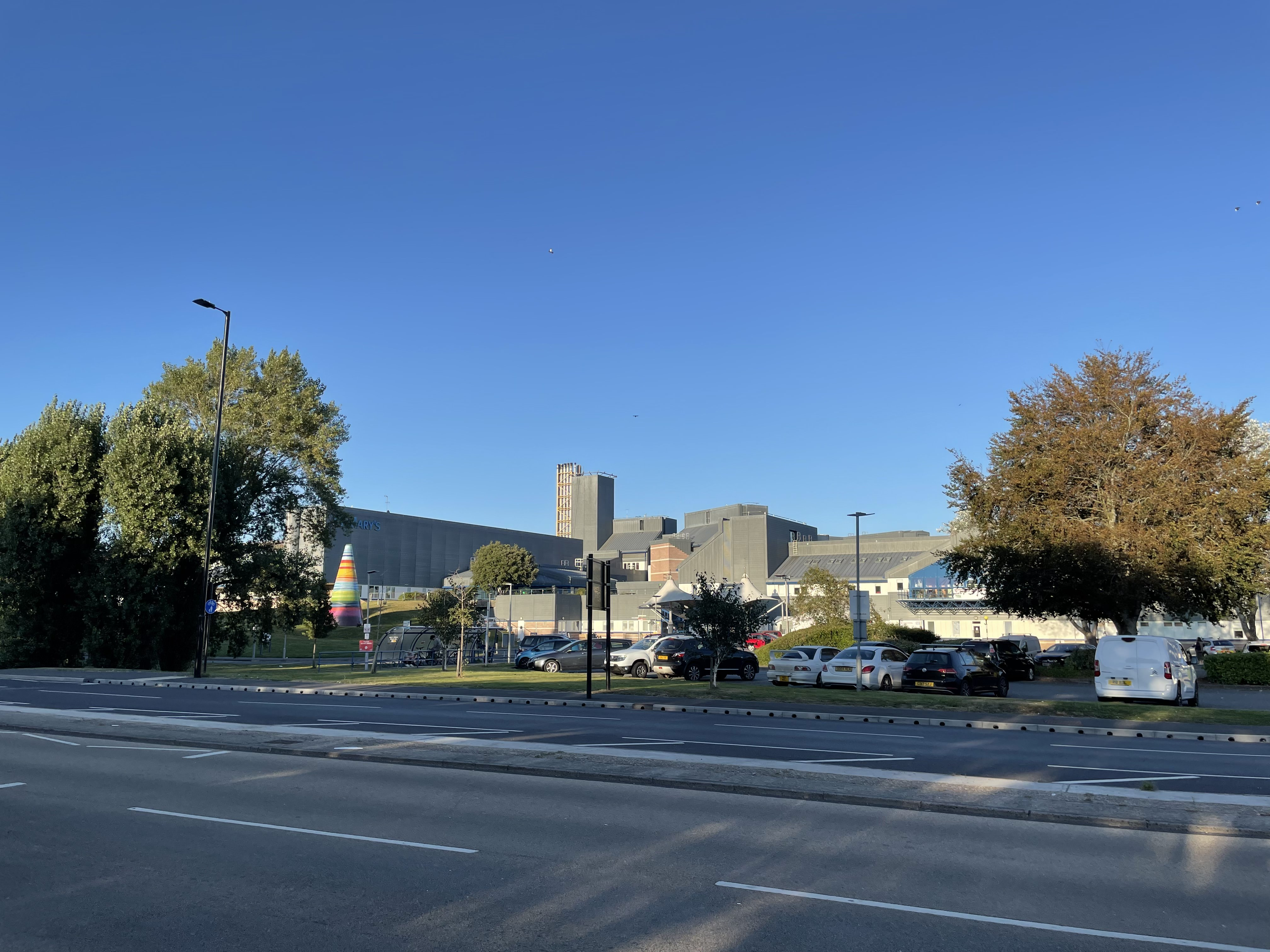
- The hospital in 2021

- Shown on the Isle of Wight

Geography
- Location: Newport, Isle of Wight, England
- Coordinates: 50.7106°N 1.3012°W

Organisation
- Care system: National Health Service
- Affiliated university: University of Southampton School of Medicine

Services
- Emergency department: Yes
- Beds: 266

Helipads
- Helipad: Yes

History
- Founded: 1990

Links
- Website: www.iow.nhs.uk

St Mary's Hospital is a hospital located on the outskirts of Newport on the Isle of Wight. It is run by the Isle of Wight NHS Trust.

== History ==
The hospital was designed by Ahrends, Burton and Koralek following a study into low-energy hospitals commissioned by the Department of Health and Social Security in 1981. It was completed in 1990 and formally opened in 1991.

An archaeological investigation was carried out on the site in 2009 but found no features or artifacts of archaeological interest.

St Mary's is also the site of a sculpture named Land Sea Light Koan, often shortened to 'the Koan'. The sculpture, which was created by Liliane Lijn and commissioned by the Isle of Wight Health Authority, was installed in 1997.

A new Medical Assessment Unit with 24 beds and space for 6 ambulant patients opened in August 2015.

In August 2022 the hospital was selected to participate in a pilot scheme to receive chemotherapy medications via delivery drone. The medicines are flown in from the pharmacy at the Queen Alexandra Hospital in Portsmouth direct to St Mary's, where staff unload the drones before distributing it to medical teams and patients in the building.

== Facilities ==
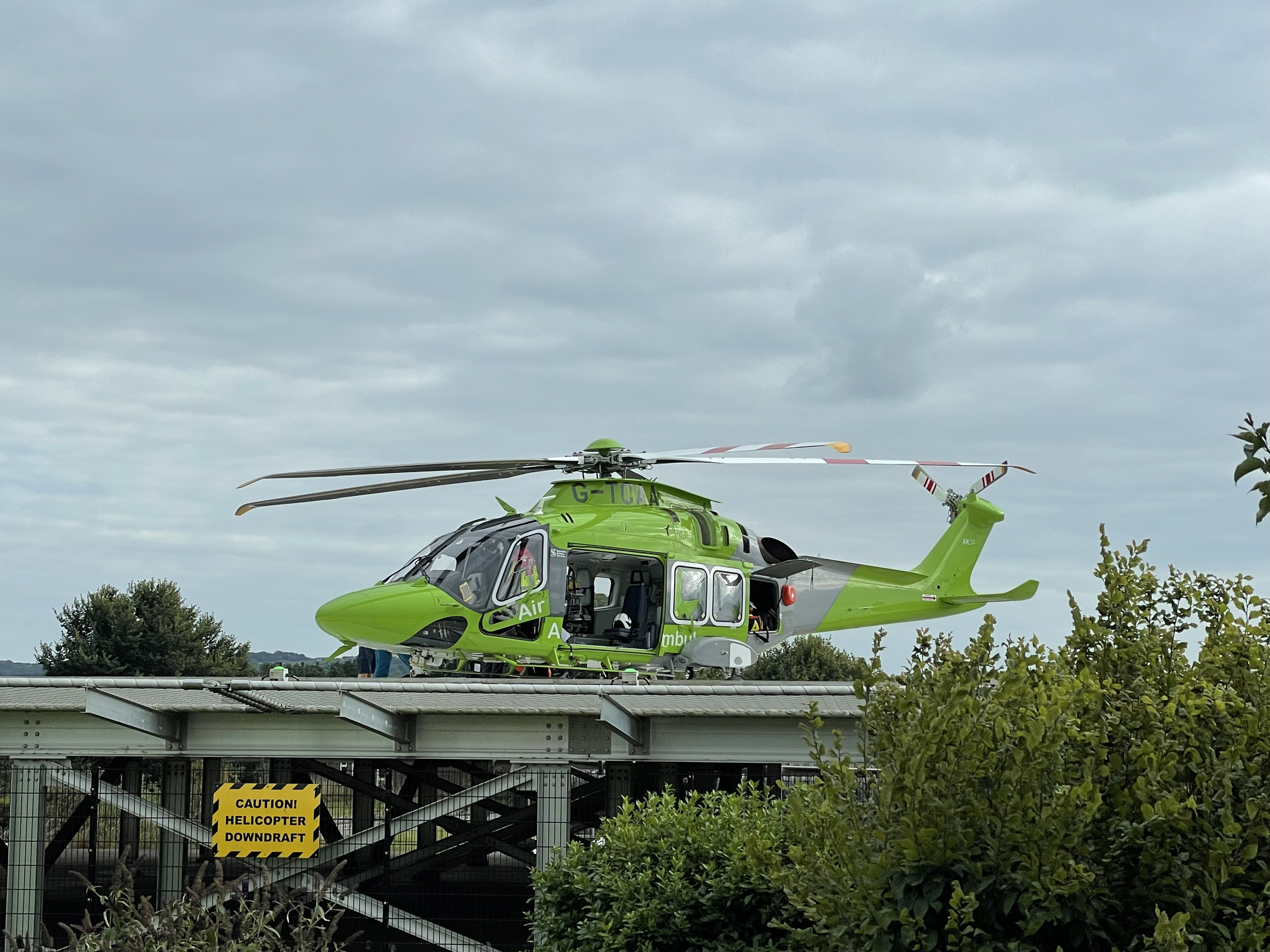
An AgustaWestland AW169 of the Children's Air Ambulance on the helipad in 2021

The hospital has 18 units and wards, 266 beds and 6 operating theatres.

Separate from the main hospital but located on the same site is Sevenacres, a psychiatric unit, with 3 wards and 32 beds.

Other facilities include a restaurant, a small shop and a Costa Coffee outlet.

Planning permission for a helipad was granted by the Isle of Wight Council in April 2012, with construction starting in October 2012 and the helipad becoming operational on 17 May 2013. By 2022 it had been seen around 1,500 landings, an average of more than 3 per week, with most transfers going to Queen Alexandra Hospital in Portsmouth or Southampton General Hospital.

== Services ==
Services provided at the hospital include cardiology, dermatology, ear, nose and throat (ENT), endocrinology, gastroenterology, general surgery, geriatrics, obstetrics and gynaecology, ophthalmology, orthopaedics, paediatrics, respiratory medicine, rheumatology, stroke medicine and urology.

Some services at the hospital are run by other NHS trusts, including the dialysis unit run by Portsmouth Hospitals University NHS Trust, and the neurology service run by visiting neurologists from University Hospital Southampton NHS Foundation Trust.

== Transport ==
The hospital is served by Southern Vectis route 1, which runs from Newport to Cowes.

== See also ==
- Earl Mountbatten Hospice
