= Woodhouse Copse, Isle of Wight =

Coordinates: 50.735°N 1.250°W

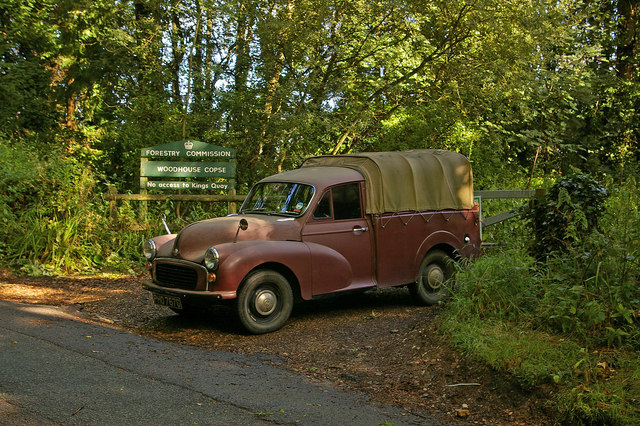
Entrance to Woodhouse Copse

Woodhouse Copse is a wood located on the north east side of the Isle of Wight between Whippingham and Wootton. It is 18 hectares in area.

The wood is bordered to the west and north by open land and to the east by Palmer's Brook, which becomes more and more marshy as it winds and slows on its way to King's Quay and the sea to the north.

In the late 1950s and early 1960s the wood was replanted.
