= Borthwood =

Coordinates: 50.658°N 1.191°W

- Hamlet
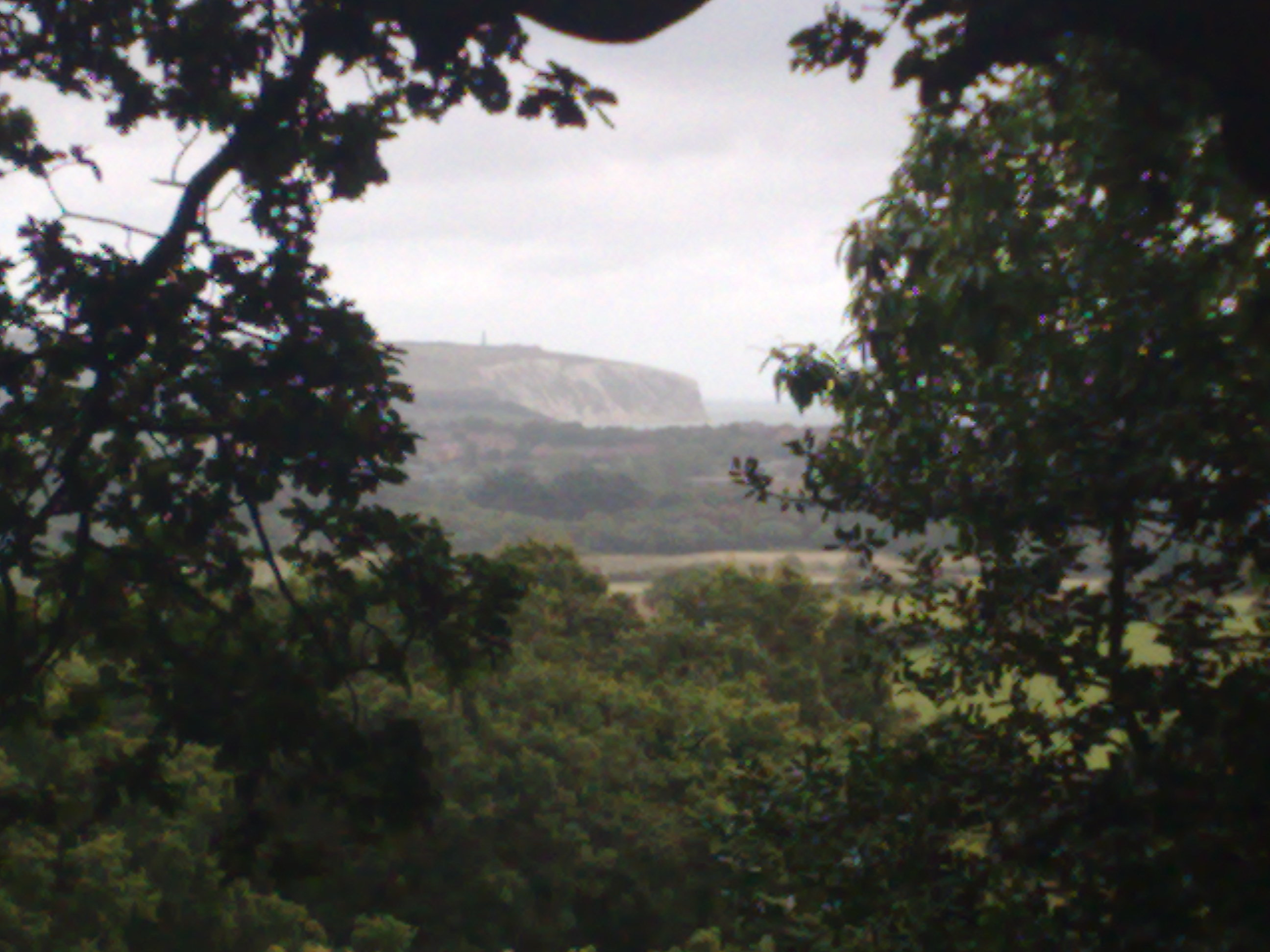
- Borthwood Copse, looking out towards Sandown and Culver Down.

- Location within the Isle of Wight
- OS grid reference: SZ573846
- Civil parish: Newchurch
- Unitary authority: Isle of Wight
- Ceremonial county: Isle of Wight
- Region: South East
- Country: England
- Sovereign state: United Kingdom
- Post town: SANDOWN
- Postcode district: PO36
- Dialling code: 01983
- Police: Hampshire and Isle of Wight
- Fire: Hampshire and Isle of Wight
- Ambulance: Isle of Wight
- UK Parliament: Isle of Wight East

Borthwood is a hamlet in the civil parish of Newchurch, Isle of Wight, on the Isle of Wight, England, adjacent to Borthwood Copse, the National Trust woodland. Borthwood includes some holiday cottages and a pet kennel.

Borthwood was the site of brickmaking operations in the past.
