= Afton Park =

Settlement on the Isle of Wight, England

Coordinates: 50.674945°N 1.505610°W

- Location within the Isle of Wight
- OS grid reference: SZ347866
- Unitary authority: Isle of Wight
- Ceremonial county: Isle of Wight
- Region: South East
- Country: England
- Sovereign state: United Kingdom
- Post town: FRESHWATER
- Postcode district: PO40
- Dialling code: 01983
- Police: Hampshire and Isle of Wight
- Fire: Hampshire and Isle of Wight
- Ambulance: Isle of Wight
- UK Parliament: Isle of Wight West

Afton Park is a settlement on the Isle of Wight, off the south coast of England.

The hamlet lies to the east of the A3055 road, near to the larger settlement of Freshwater . Afton park is approximately 10 miles (16 km) west of Newport.

The gardens at the park incorporate a farm shop, cafe, plant nursery, wildflower meadow and apple orchard. In 2010, the park was purchased by Paul & Michaela Heathcote, who also own Chinashop Rare Breeds in Bathingbourne. As of 2010, the Heathcotes planned to maintain the existing layout of the park, while also using it to display the collection of livestock from Chinashop Rare Breeds.

Transport is provided by Southern Vectis route 7, which runs close by.

The Apple Farm now caters for weddings only.
