= Eaglehead and Bloodstone Copses =

Protected area on the Isle of Wight, England

Coordinates: 50.686°N 1.177°W

- Site of Special Scientific Interest
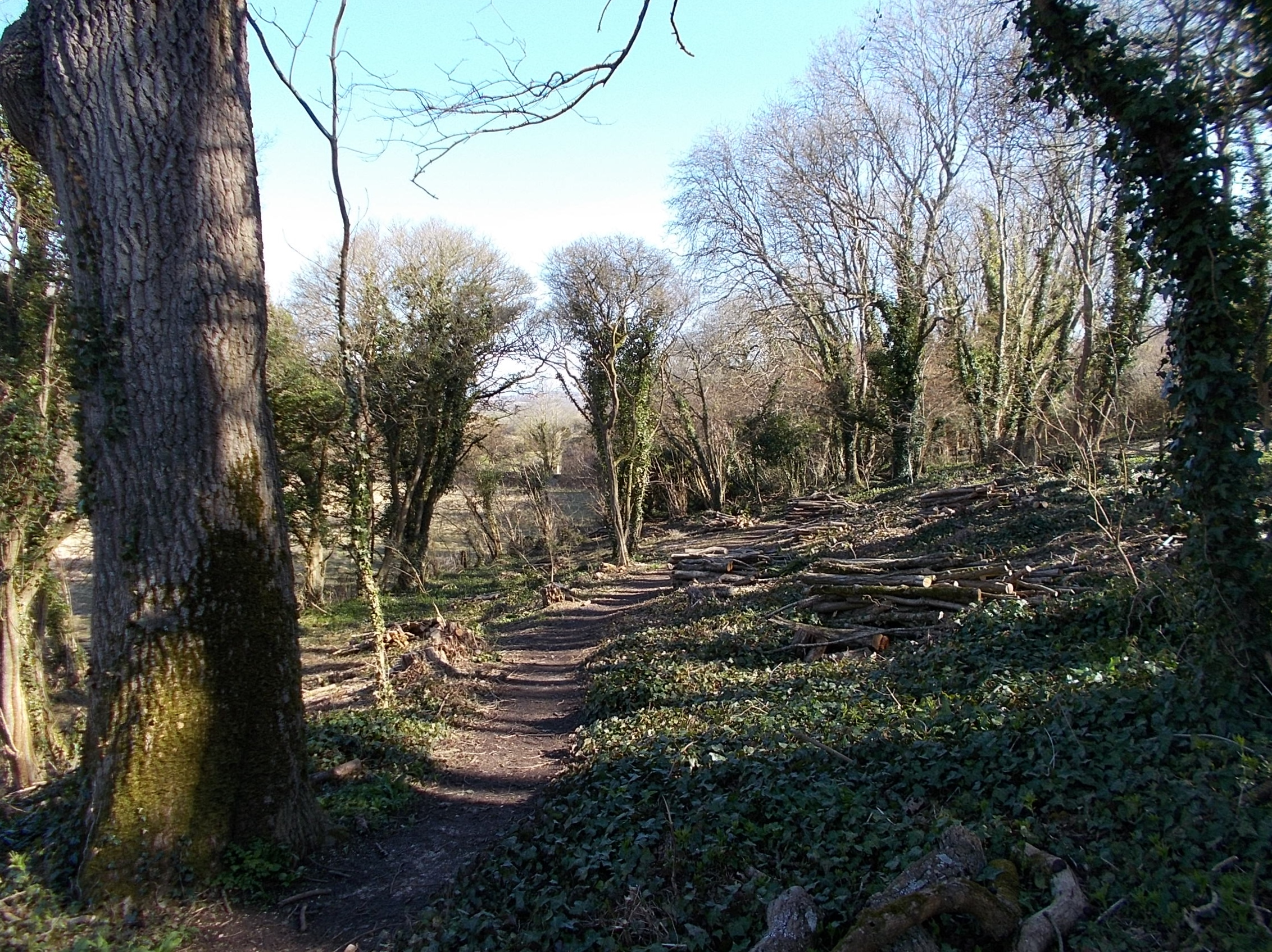
- Eaglehead Copse
- Location of Eaglehead and Bloodstone Copses.
- Area of search: Isle of Wight
- Grid reference: SZ584877
- Interest: Biological
- Area: 10.3 ha (25 acres)
- Notification date: 1987
- Location map: Natural England

Eaglehead and Bloodstone Copses is a 10.3-hectare (25-acre) Site of Special Scientific Interest which is south of Ashey on the Isle of Wight. The site was notified in 1987 for its biological value.

This area of woodland follows a stream at the foot of Ashey Down and is owned by the Hampshire and Isle of Wight Wildlife Trust, who manage it to encourage red squirrels and other local wildlife. The stream is said to contain stones stained red by the blood of a battle between "Saxons and Danes", although this is said to be due to red algae, although it is difficult to actually find any. The position is quite a likely one for such a battle as the valley through which the stream flows forms a defensive barrier against any force attempting to attack Carisbrooke from a landing in Bembridge Harbour. It could equally be the site of the battle between Saxons and Jutes in 686 CE where King Arwald was killed by King Caedwalla.

In 1995 a Cruciform Brooch was brought to I.O.W Archaeological Centre. It was found at Bloodstone Copse. It had come from an Early Anglo-Saxon cemetery, or possible a secondary burial of an Anglo Saxon, at a Bronze Age cemetery which was located upslope of the find location.
