= Branstone, Isle of Wight =

Coordinates: 50.649507°N 1.213513°W

Branstone
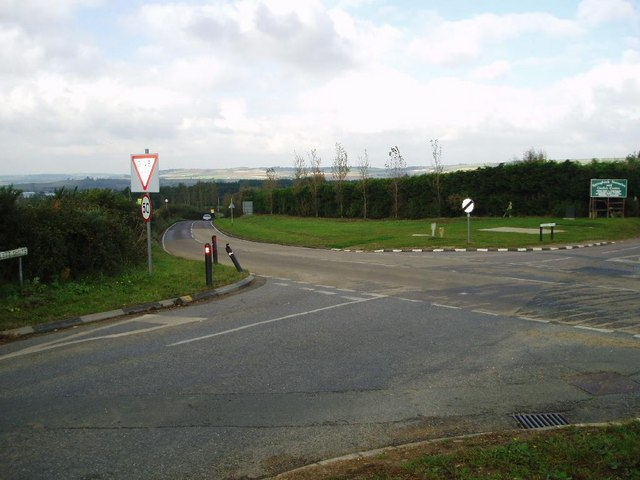
- The Branstone Crossroads

- Location within the Isle of Wight
- OS grid reference: SZ557835
- Unitary authority: Isle of Wight
- Ceremonial county: Isle of Wight
- Region: South East
- Country: England
- Sovereign state: United Kingdom
- Post town: SANDOWN
- Postcode district: PO36
- Dialling code: 01983
- Police: Hampshire and Isle of Wight
- Fire: Hampshire and Isle of Wight
- Ambulance: Isle of Wight
- UK Parliament: Isle of Wight East

Branstone is a hamlet on the Isle of Wight, off the south coast of England. According to the Post Office the population of the hamlet at the 2011 Census was included in the civil parish of Newchurch.

The hamlet lies on the A3056 road, near to the larger settlement of Sandown. Branstone is approximately 5 miles (8.0 km) south-east of Newport. Branstone Farm Studies Centre was established in 1973 to give younger children an opportunity to sample life on a working farm. Branstone was a small village community in the 18th century and was the site of the first co-operative shop on the Island; being part of the Shanklin, Lake and Branstone Cooperative Union. The shop is now part of two private houses, called Headley House and Headley Grange.
