= Borthwood Copse =

Woodland on the Isle of Wight, England

Coordinates: 50°39′21″N 1°11′43″W

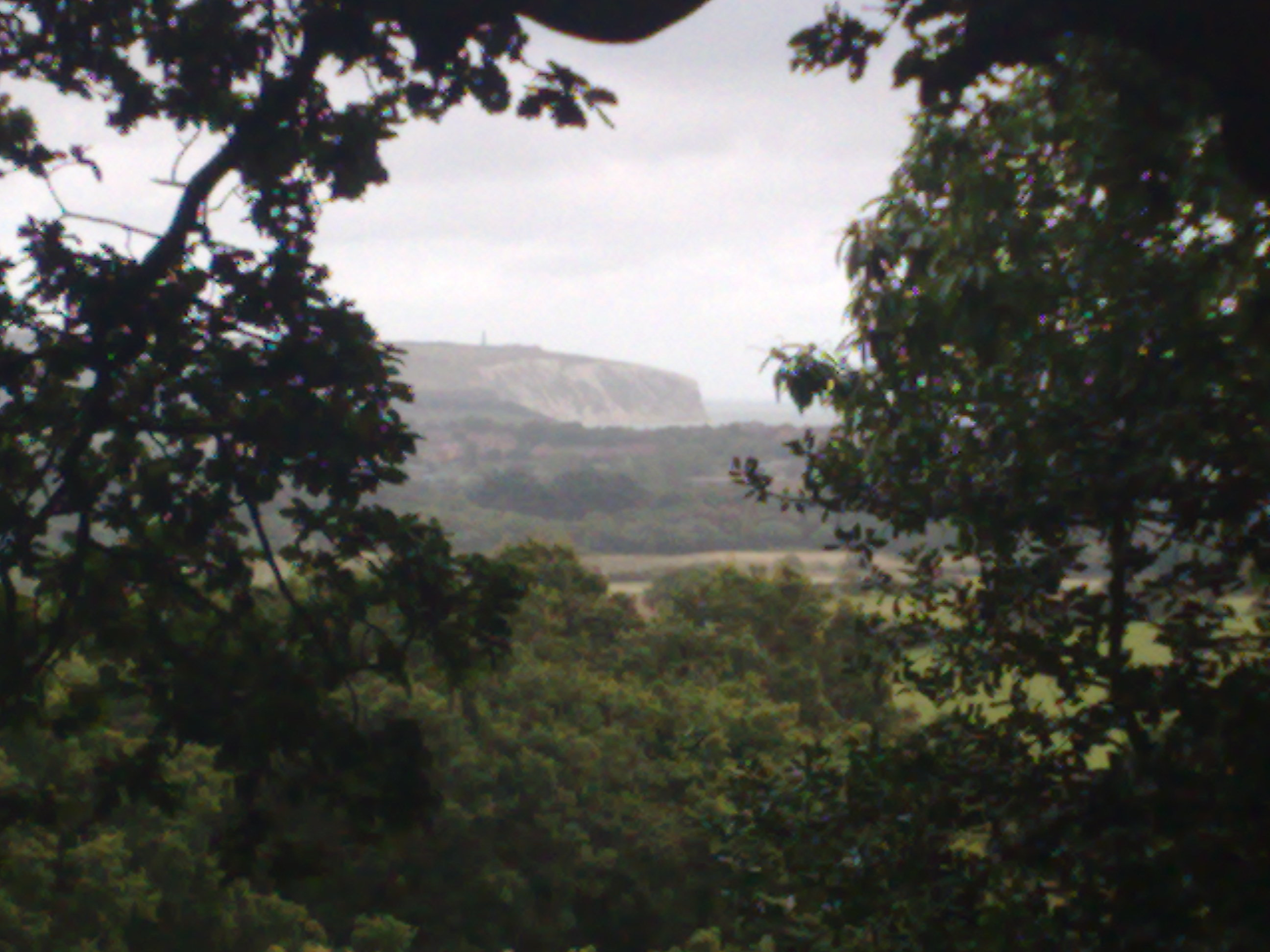
Glimpse of Culver Down from a viewpoint in Borthwood Copse

Borthwood Copse, near Sandown, Isle of Wight, England is a piece of woodland owned by the National Trust and is one of the numerous copses which make up part of the medieval forest which covered most of the eastern end of the Island. Borthwood Copse sits on the outskirts of Newchurch, and is close to the neighbouring hamlet of Apse Heath and the villages of Queen's Bower and Alverstone. Borthwood Copse was originally a royal hunting ground. It was bequeathed to the National Trust in 1926 by Frank Morey. He had purchased it a few years earlier to preserve it for wildlife. Subsequent additions have been added to the land and it now covers a total of 60 acres (240,000 m^{2}).

There are some ancient oaks, and a distinctive grove of beech trees which stand amongst glades of coppiced sweet chestnut and hazel. The woodland is one of the very few examples of working coppice with standards which can be seen on the Isle of Wight. A bridleway and many smaller paths lead through the woodland, which is open to the public. It is particularly popular with visitors in the autumn with its vivid colours and, in the springtime, when carpeted with bluebells. Borthwood Copse is one of the countless locations in the Eastern Isle of Wight that are home to large numbers of Red Squirrels.

Owing to its position on the downs, much of Borthwood Copse is hilly, and in wet weather the soil often becomes waterlogged and marshy, making travel through the copse on foot difficult.

Within the wood is a viewpoint looking east from where you can catch a glimpse of Culver Down and the sea. As the copse climbs a small hill, Bembridge Windmill can be seen in the distance through the downs on clear days.

Wildlife includes dormice, red squirrels, a wide range of bats, and many invertebrates.

The view point is called Kite Hill.

== See also ==
- List of old growth forests
