= Apse Heath =

Coordinates: 50.64718°N 1.2028°W

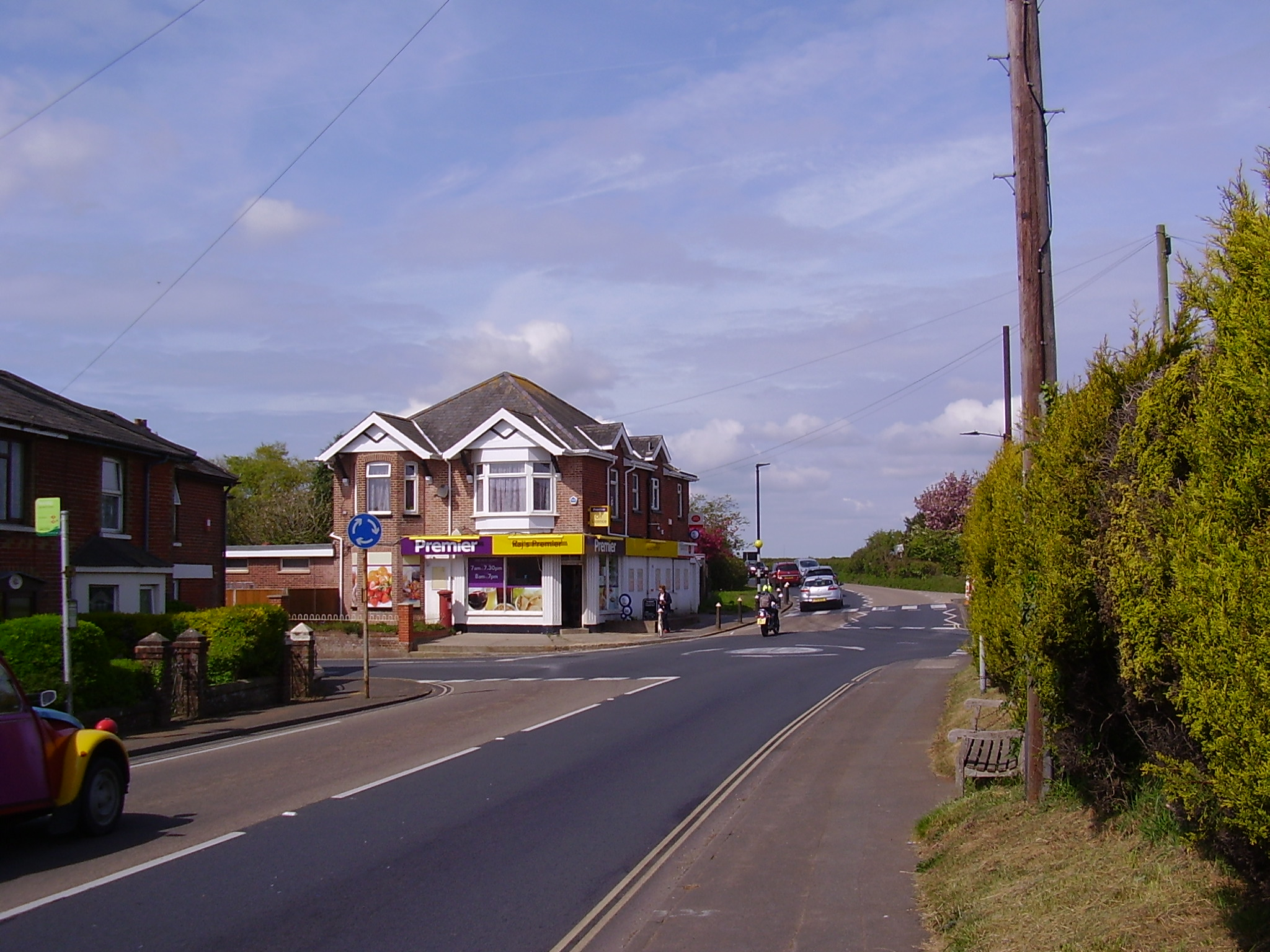
- Main road at Apse Heath

- Location within the Isle of Wight
- OS grid reference: SZ564833
- Civil parish: Newchurch
- Unitary authority: Isle of Wight
- Ceremonial county: Isle of Wight
- Region: South East
- Country: England
- Sovereign state: United Kingdom
- Post town: SANDOWN
- Postcode district: PO36
- Dialling code: 01983
- Police: Hampshire and Isle of Wight
- Fire: Hampshire and Isle of Wight
- Ambulance: Isle of Wight
- UK Parliament: Isle of Wight East

Apse Heath is a hamlet on the Isle of Wight, UK. Apse Heath is centered on the intersection of Newport Road and Alverstone Road. At the 2011 Census the Post Office said the population of the hamlet was included in the civil parish of Newchurch, Isle of Wight. It is northeast of Whiteley Bank and south of Winford. Apse Heath is bordered by the leafy villages of Alverstone and Queen's Bower, and is surrounded by areas of woodland and agricultural land. It also sits roughly 2 miles east of the village of Newchurch, and 1 mile west of Lake.

The word "apse" in the local dialect means an aspen tree, or Populus tremula. Thus, Apse Heath refers to a Heath (small moor) populated by Aspens.

Apse Heath Methodist Church had a congregation of 11 to 15 that met every Sunday to worship. The church was founded in 1875 by the Bryanites or Bible Christians. The cornerstone of the present chapel was laid by Lord Alverstone, on 10 September 1902. Electric lights were installed in the church and hall in 1956. The church closed for worship in 2013 and after extensive refurbishment is now a successful holiday let known as The Old Chapel, Apse Heath.

On 12 January 2006, two horses were injured in a fire in some stables in Apse Heath. On 5 August 2007, a small plane crashed, briefly after taking off from Isle of Wight Airport in Sandown in Lake, next to Apse Heath, killing all 4 passengers.

Apse Heath was the site of brickmaking operations in the past. It was also the site of a sweet factory, which employed a number of local people until it closed down.

Transport is provided by Southern Vectis route 8, which runs through the hamlet between Newport, Sandown, Bembridge and Ryde.
