= Winford, Isle of Wight =

Village in the Isle of Wight, England

Coordinates: 50.654°N 1.204°W

Winford
- Village
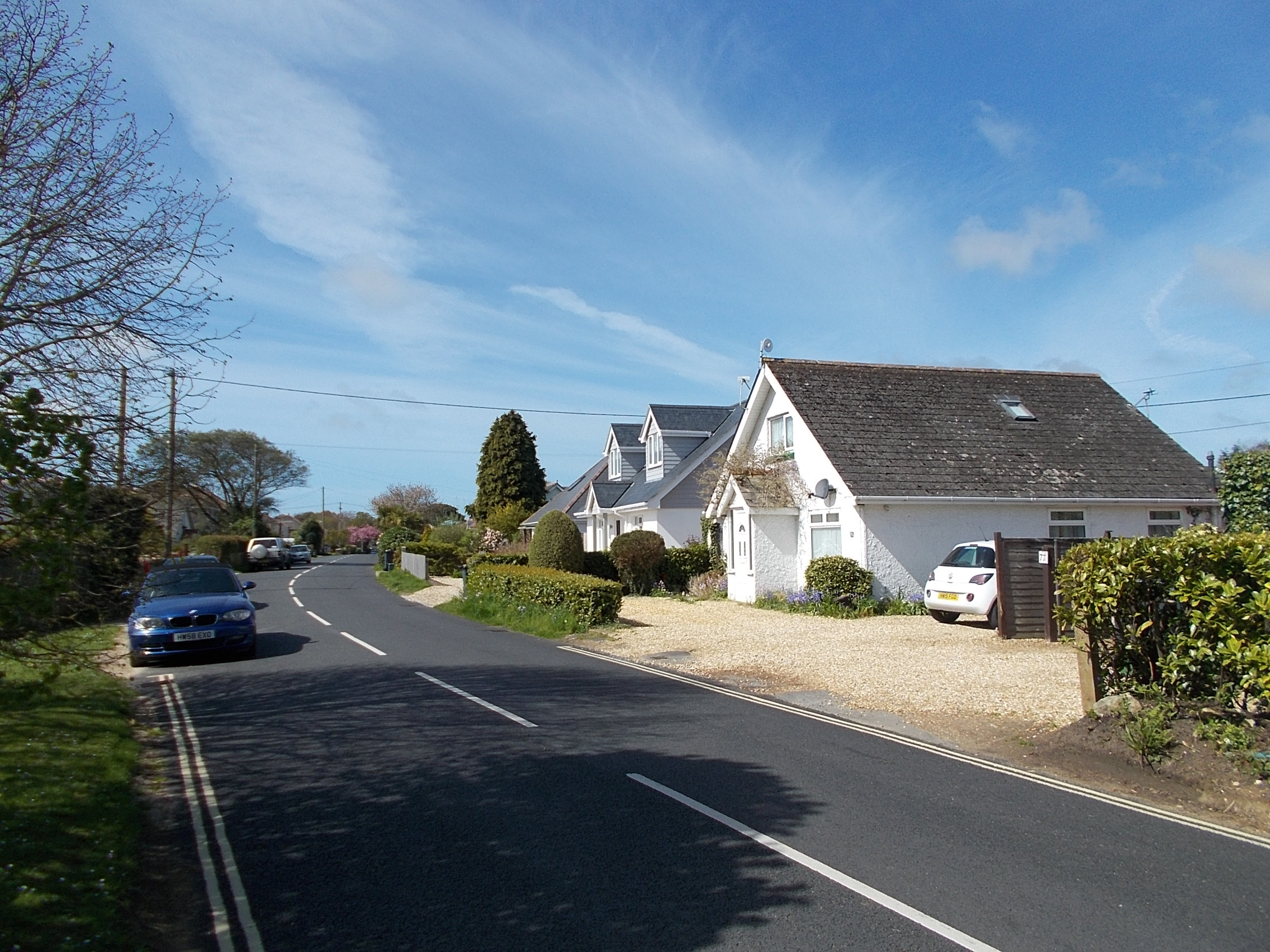
- Forest Road, Winford

- Location within the Isle of Wight
- Area: 0.4378 km^{2} (0.1690 sq mi)
- Population: 1,165 (2024 estimate)
  - Density: 2,661/km^{2} (6,890/sq mi)
- OS grid reference: SZ5649684175
- Civil parish: Newchurch
- Unitary authority: Isle of Wight
- Ceremonial county: Isle of Wight
- Region: South East
- Country: England
- Sovereign state: United Kingdom
- Post town: SANDOWN
- Postcode district: PO
- Police: Hampshire and Isle of Wight
- Fire: Hampshire and Isle of Wight
- Ambulance: Isle of Wight

Winford is a hamlet in the civil parish of Newchurch, on the Isle of Wight which since the 1950s and particularly in the late 1970s has seen considerable housing development. The local shop in Forest Road closed some time ago, but tourist attractions with gift shops are situated nearby. In 2024 it had an estimated population of 1165.

The pipes supplying Winford with water are being replaced as part of a massive upgrading of the infrastructure supplying water to the Isle of Wight. In addition, two huge pipes supplying the Isle of Wight with water from the mainland of England are being replaced, and water pipelines are being extended in the south of the Island.

== Name ==
The name probably means 'the ford by the pasture or meadow', from Old English winn and ford. The 14th century spelling is a surname with Middle English atte 'at the'. The ford was probably one from a tributary of the Eastern Yar.

~1246: Winford

~1290: Wynford

1303: Attewenforde

1608: Wenford

1769: Winford

== Transportation ==
Southern Vectis bus route 8 and former Wightbus route 23 link Winford with the towns of Newport, Sandown, Shanklin and Ryde, including intermediate villages.
