= Cranmore, Isle of Wight =

Coordinates: 50.715°N 1.446°W

Cranmore
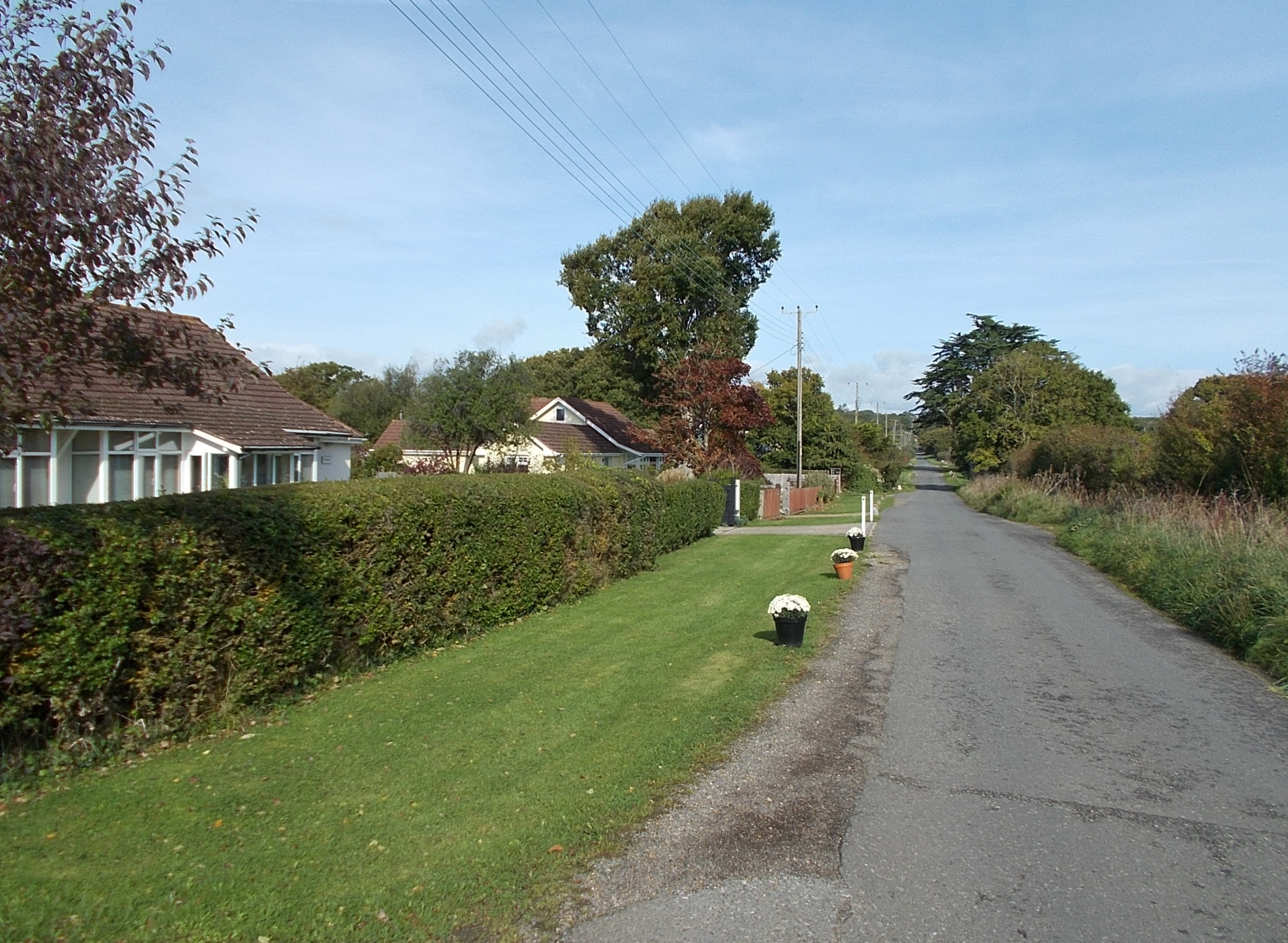

- Location within the Isle of Wight
- OS grid reference: SZ391913
- Unitary authority: Isle of Wight
- Ceremonial county: Isle of Wight
- Region: South East
- Country: England
- Sovereign state: United Kingdom
- Post town: YARMOUTH
- Postcode district: PO41
- Dialling code: 01983
- Police: Hampshire and Isle of Wight
- Fire: Hampshire and Isle of Wight
- Ambulance: Isle of Wight
- UK Parliament: Isle of Wight West

Cranmore is a village on the Isle of Wight. It is located about three miles east of Yarmouth, in the northwest of the island. It is in the civil parish of Shalfleet.

== Name ==
Its name means 'the marshy ground frequented by cranes or herons', from Old English cran and mōr. The mōr was mentioned in a 10th-century Saxon charter describing the bounds of Ningwood, a nearby village, - thæs mores heafde, meaning to the head of the moor or marshland, or could be referring to Newtown Salt Marsh, a nearby marsh.

1235: Cranemore

1559: Cranmores

1781: Cranmore

== History ==
On 11 July 1940, a Hurricane P3681 whose pilot was A.W Wooley that had taken off from Tangmere Airfield was shot by an invader in a Heinkel-manufactured plane and burst into flames after being shot in the engine by anti-aircraft guns off Selsey Bill, baled out and landed safely at Thorness Bay, and nose-diving towards the southwest of Cranmore near Ningwood Common. Its remains remained there until 24 April 1982 when it was discovered on a "dig". It was preserved.

== Transport ==
Transport is provided by Southern Vectis bus route 7, serving Freshwater, Yarmouth and Newport including intermediate towns.

== SSSI ==
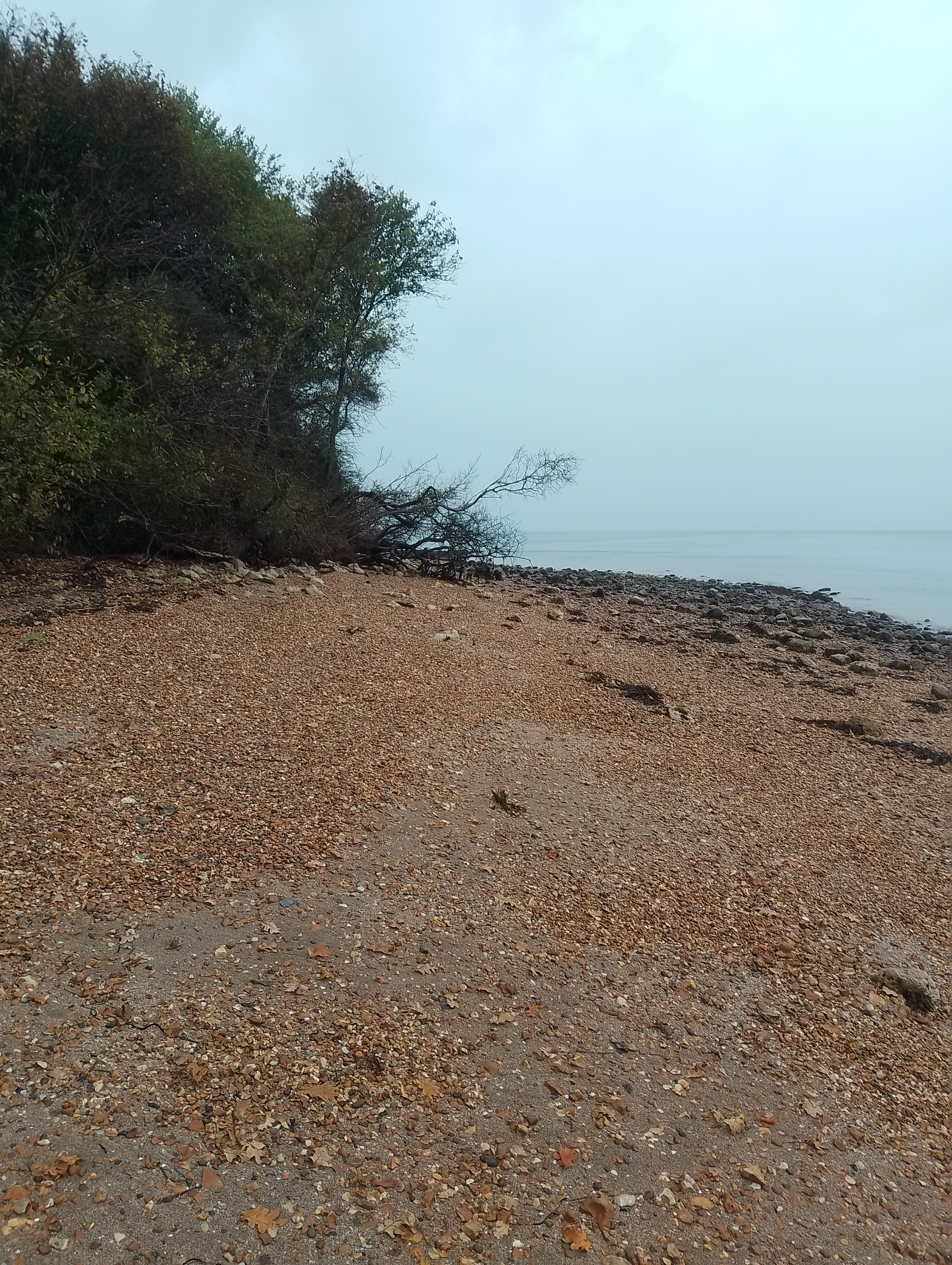
The beach near Cranmore and Hamstead.

Three areas of grassland, scrub, woodland and cliffs situated around the village are designated as a Site of Special Scientific Interest (SSSI). Together the three areas cover 12.4 hectares (30.7 acres) and were notified in 2002. The sites are home to the dormouse (Muscardinus avellanarius), red squirrel (Sciurus vulgaris) and the nationally scarce small pearl-bordered fritillary (Boloria selene) and Kent black arches (Meganola albula). Other species include the adder (Vipera berus) and the common lizard (Lacerta vivipara), and nightingale (Luscinia megarhynchos).
