= Newtown Bay =

Bay in the Isle of Wight, England

Coordinates: 50°44′N 1°25′W

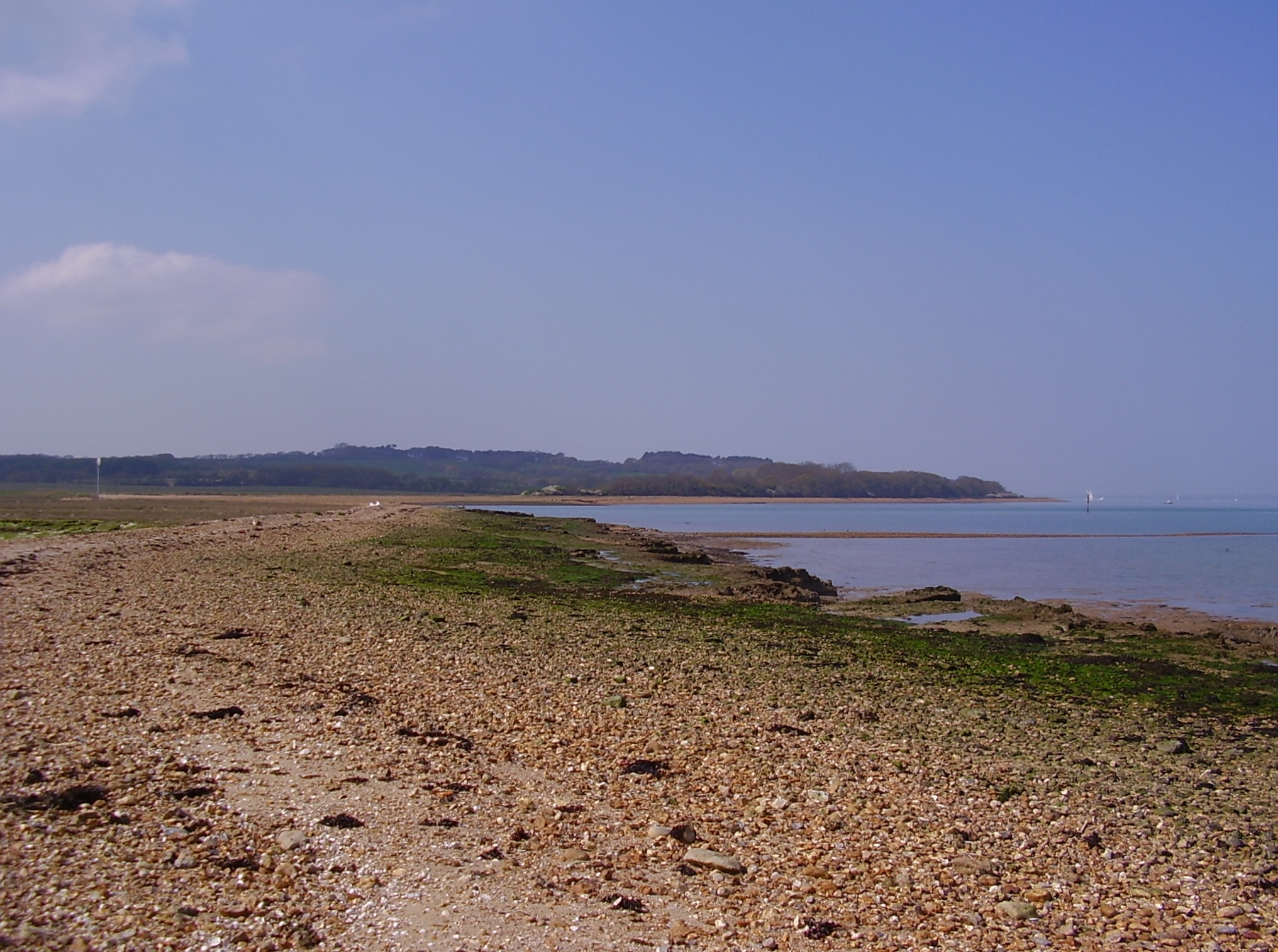
- Newtown Bay; looking west across the mouth of Newtown Harbour

- Location within the Isle of Wight
- Ceremonial county: Isle of Wight
- Region: South East
- Country: England
- Sovereign state: United Kingdom
- UK Parliament: Isle of Wight West

Newtown Bay is a bay on the northwestern coast of the Isle of Wight, England in the western arm of the Solent. It is a subtle bay located around the exit of the Newtown River. It stretches about 2 1/2 miles (4 km) from Hamstead Point in the west to Salt Mead Ledge to the east.

The area is remote, with few properties along this stretch of coastline. One of the most notable landmarks is Newtown Old Hall, an ancient building of historical significance. It being low-lying marshland and home to countless sea birds, and is often visited by walkers, boaters, birdwatchers and beachcombers. The shore is a narrow band of gravel, while the sea bottom is mostly mud or sand.

To the east of the river entrance, sticking out into the bay, is a sand spit and further east another sailing hazard called Salt Mead Ledge both of these are only uncovered at low water. From here to Great Thorness to the east and Porchfield to the south, the land is used by the military and is marked on maps as a Danger Area. For this reason, the Isle of Wight coastal path skirts this area.

A small peninsula into the bay holds Corf county campsite in 23 acres (9.3 ha) of oak coastal woodland, itself an SSSI.

The National Trust owns much of the land and landing at Fishhouse point is not allowed.

In 2025, a critically endangered Aulonia albimana wolf spider was found in the bay, marking the first time it had been spotted in the UK since 1985.
