= Clamerkin Lake =

Tidal estuary on the Isle of Wight

Coordinates: 50.72087°N 1.39453°W

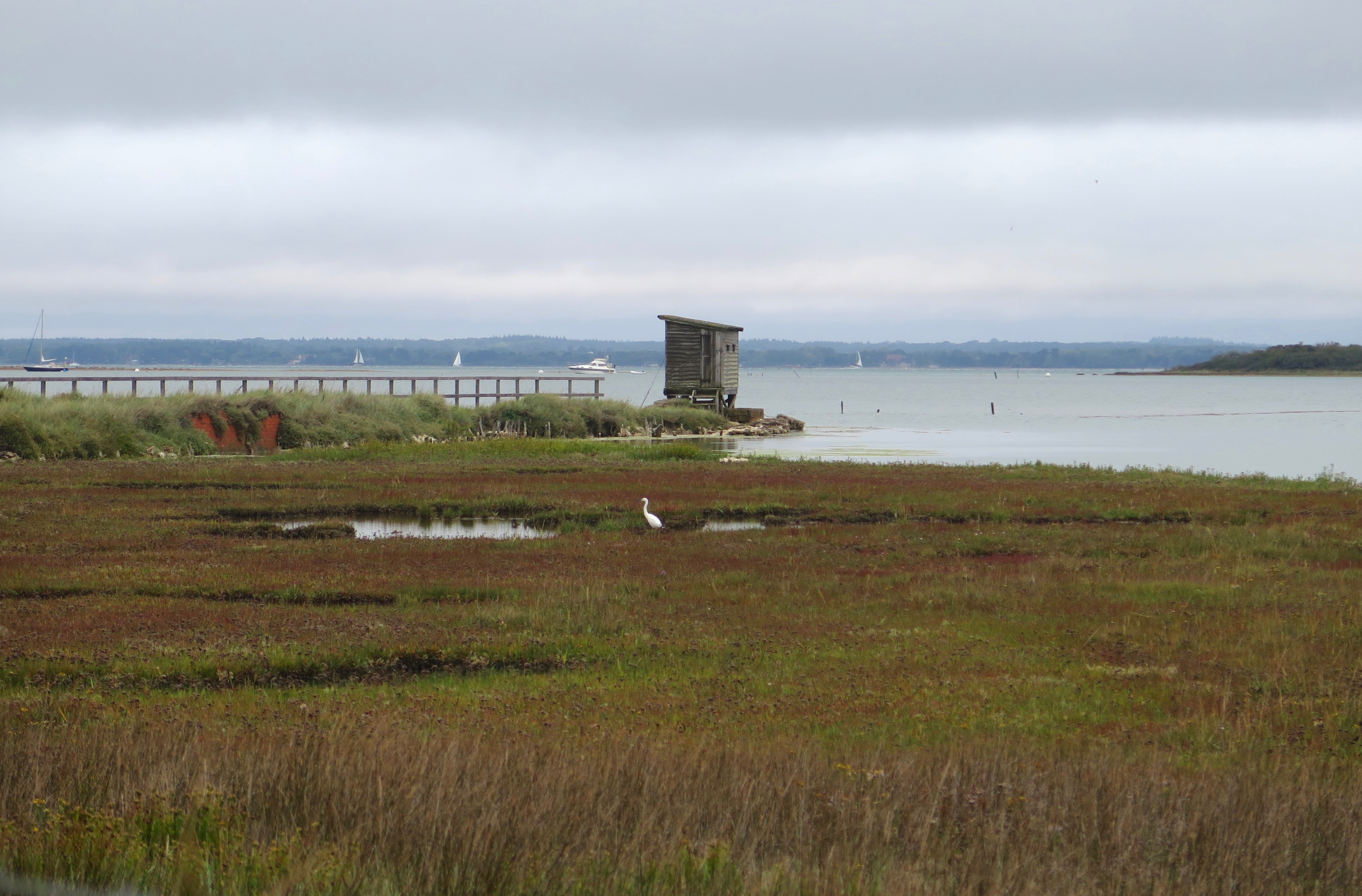
The bird hide at the shore of Clamerkin Lake

Clamerkin Lake is a tidal estuary (locally called lakes) on the Isle of Wight. It is situated in Newtown Harbour and the Newtown Harbour National Nature Reserve. It forms a tidal headwater that takes water ~3 km inland, forming Clamerkin Brook and Rodge Brook.

== Name ==
The name is manorial, from a rental in 1507 which refers to 'late in the occupation of Thomas Clamorgan'. The Clamorgan family owned a number of estates on the Isle of Wight in the 13th and 14th centuries. Lake is from Old English lacu (a small stream), as in the name of the village of Lake. There are other lakes in the Newtown Harbour: Western Haven, Ningwood Lake, Causeway Lake and Spur Lake.

== Wildlife ==
Eels live in the lake and Rodge Brook, whilst seals just live in the lake. Its water quality is good, with a bird hide by the shore.
