= Newtown River =

River on the Isle of Wight, England

Coordinates: 50.71894°N 1.41067°W

Newtown Harbour
- Site of Special Scientific Interest
- Location of Newtown Harbour.
- Area of search: Isle of Wight
- Grid reference: SZ417912
- Interest: Biological
- Area: 619.3 ha (1,530 acres)
- Notification date: 1951
- Location map: Natural England

Newtown River shown within the Isle of Wight

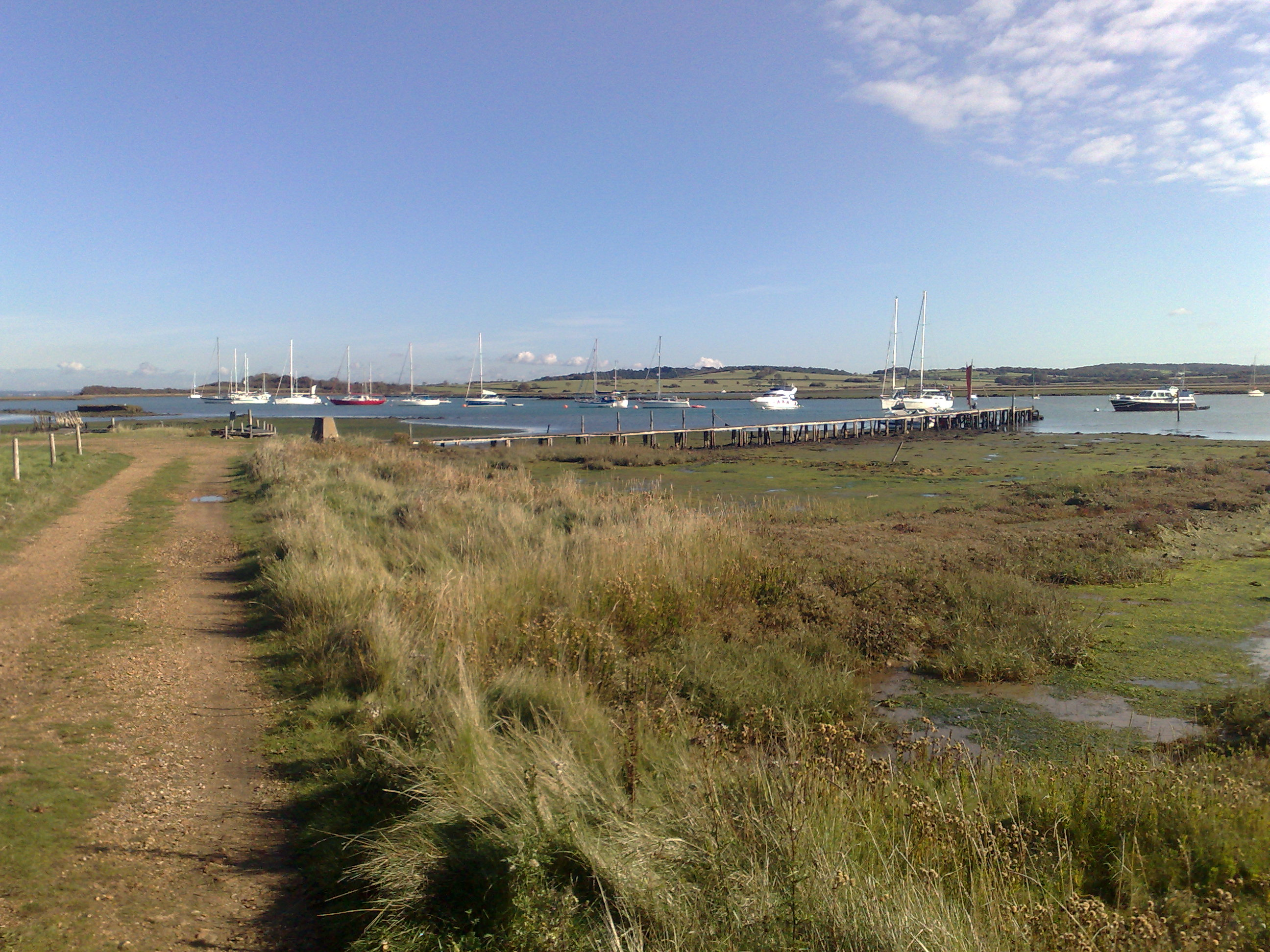
Newtown River with yachts at anchor

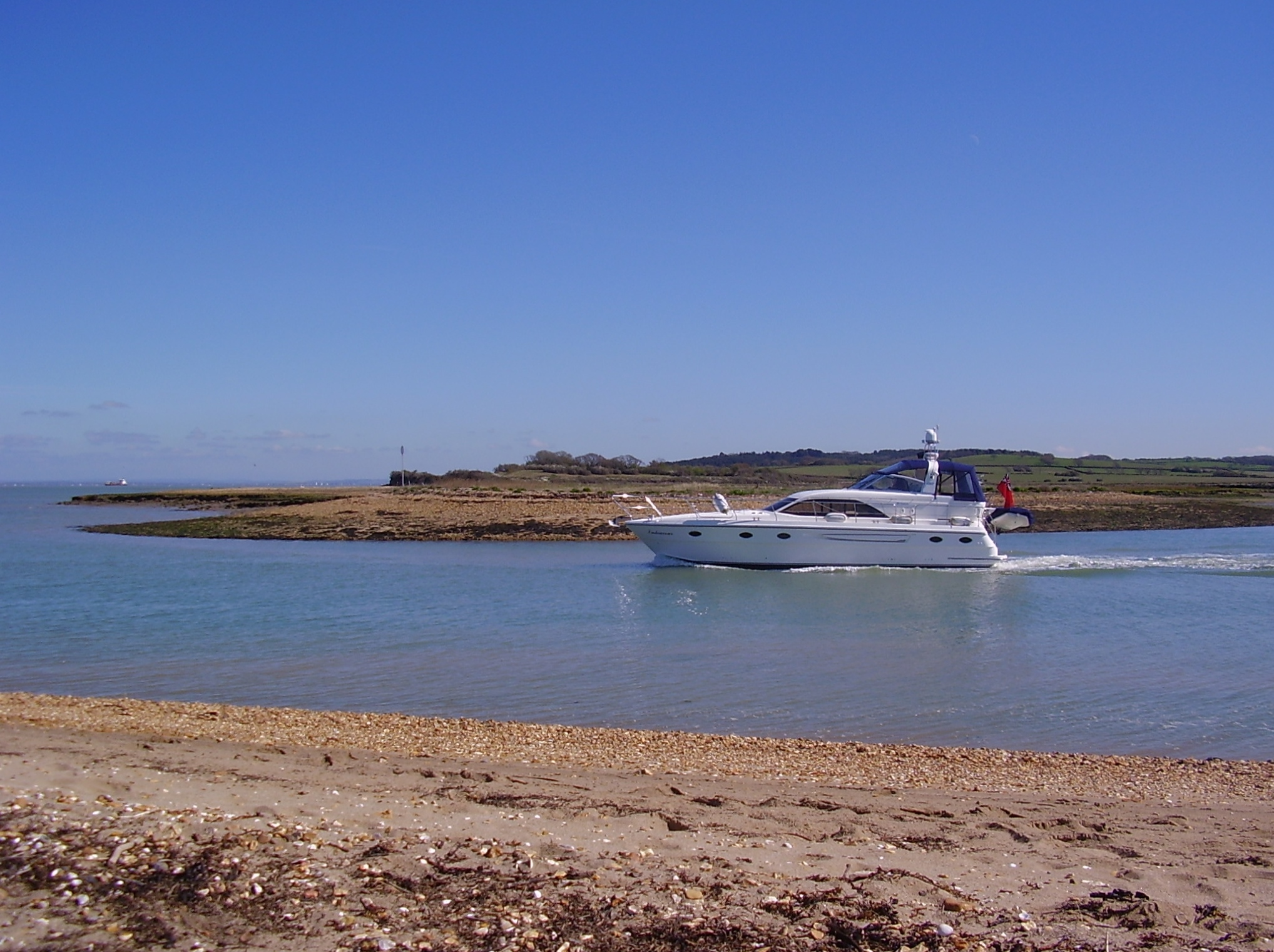
The mouth of Newtown Harbour

Newtown River is a large natural inland harbour located on the Isle of Wight's northwestern coast, named after the nearby village of Newtown. It is sometimes also referred to as Newtown Creek.

Newtown Harbour is the name given by Natural England to the River and surrounding land, and this area is the only national nature reserve on the island. It is owned and managed by the National Trust.

Newtown River consists of a number of estuaries of small rivers, known locally as "lakes", and has the form of several finger-like indentations in the coastline. They are Clamerkin Lake, Spur Lake, Ningwood Lake, Western Haven, Corf Lake, Shalfleet Lake and Causeway Lake.

The narrow entrance to Newtown River is 3/4 of a mile east of Hamstead Point, in the centre of Newtown Bay. The entrance needs navigating with care as there is a bar across the entrance, strong cross tides and a fair flow of water in and out of the entrance channel at mid-tide. Although, much mud is exposed in the harbour at low water, there are a number of moorings in the deeper parts of the creeks and lakes and the anchorage can become crowded at weekends during the main sailing season.

Scouts from nearby Corf Camp often make use of the Estuary for expeditions from the jetty on the shore.

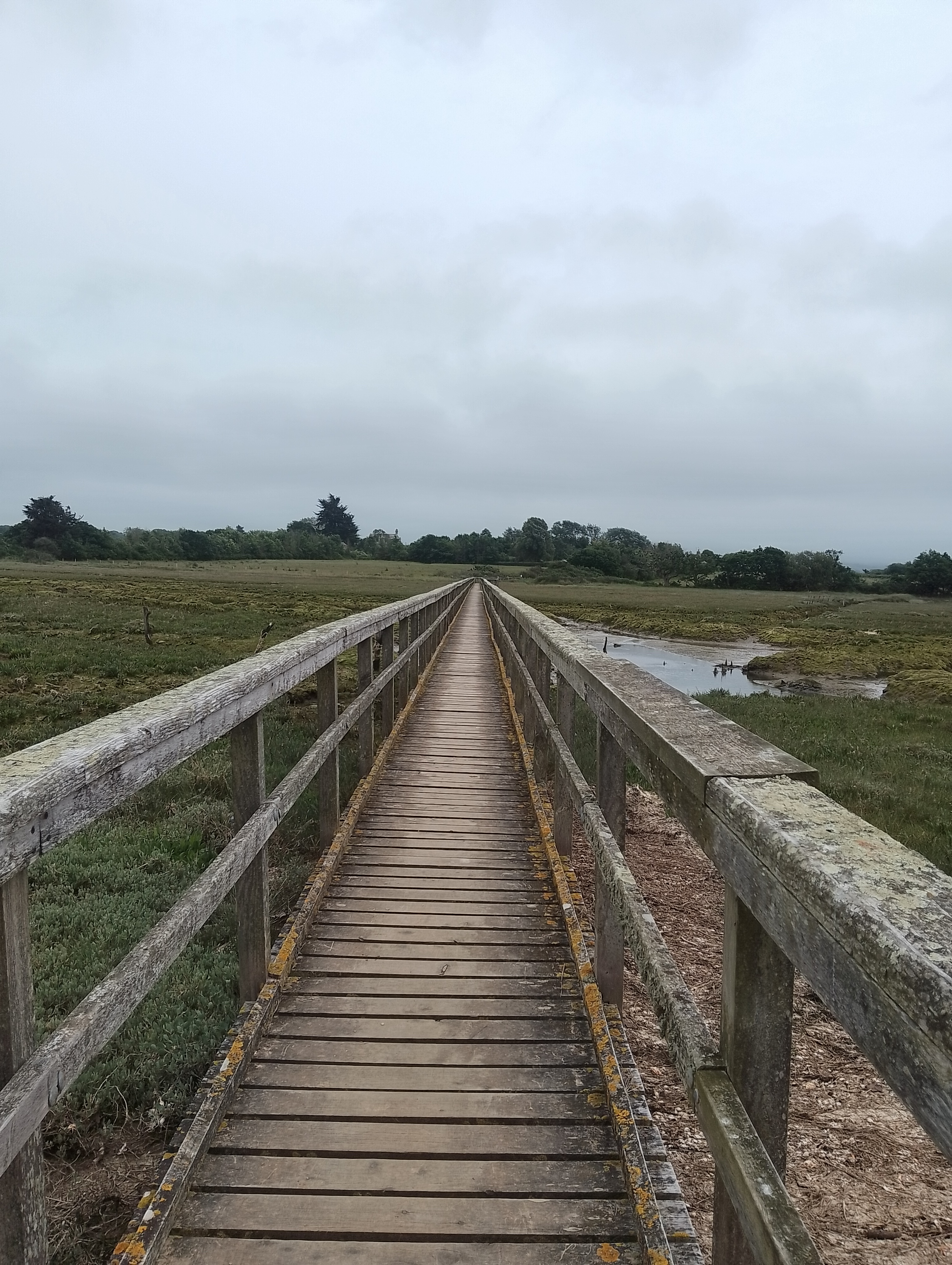
The Boardwalk at Newtown

The harbour is loved for its unspoilt beauty and tranquility. The River and adjoining land are regarded as one of the best examples of an undisturbed natural harbour on the south coast of England with its varied habitats ranging from woodland, ancient meadows, mudflats and marshland. It supports a number of rare species, but its primary importance is as a wintering ground for seabirds.

The River is part of the Isle of Wight's Area of Outstanding Natural Beauty (AONB), and is part of the Hamstead Heritage Coast.

The area is also part of a 619.3-hectare (1,530-acre) biological Site of Special Scientific Interest (SSSI). It was notified in 1951.

Two major landowners own most of the area designated as Newton Harbour SSSI; the National Trust (the coastal section and land west of Clamerkin Brook) and the Ministry of Defence (land east of Clamerkin Brook, including Jersey Camp).

The villages of Newtown, Shalfleet and Cranmore lie close to its shore.
