= Ashey =

Hamlet on the Isle of Wight

Coordinates: 50.70018°N 1.17789°W

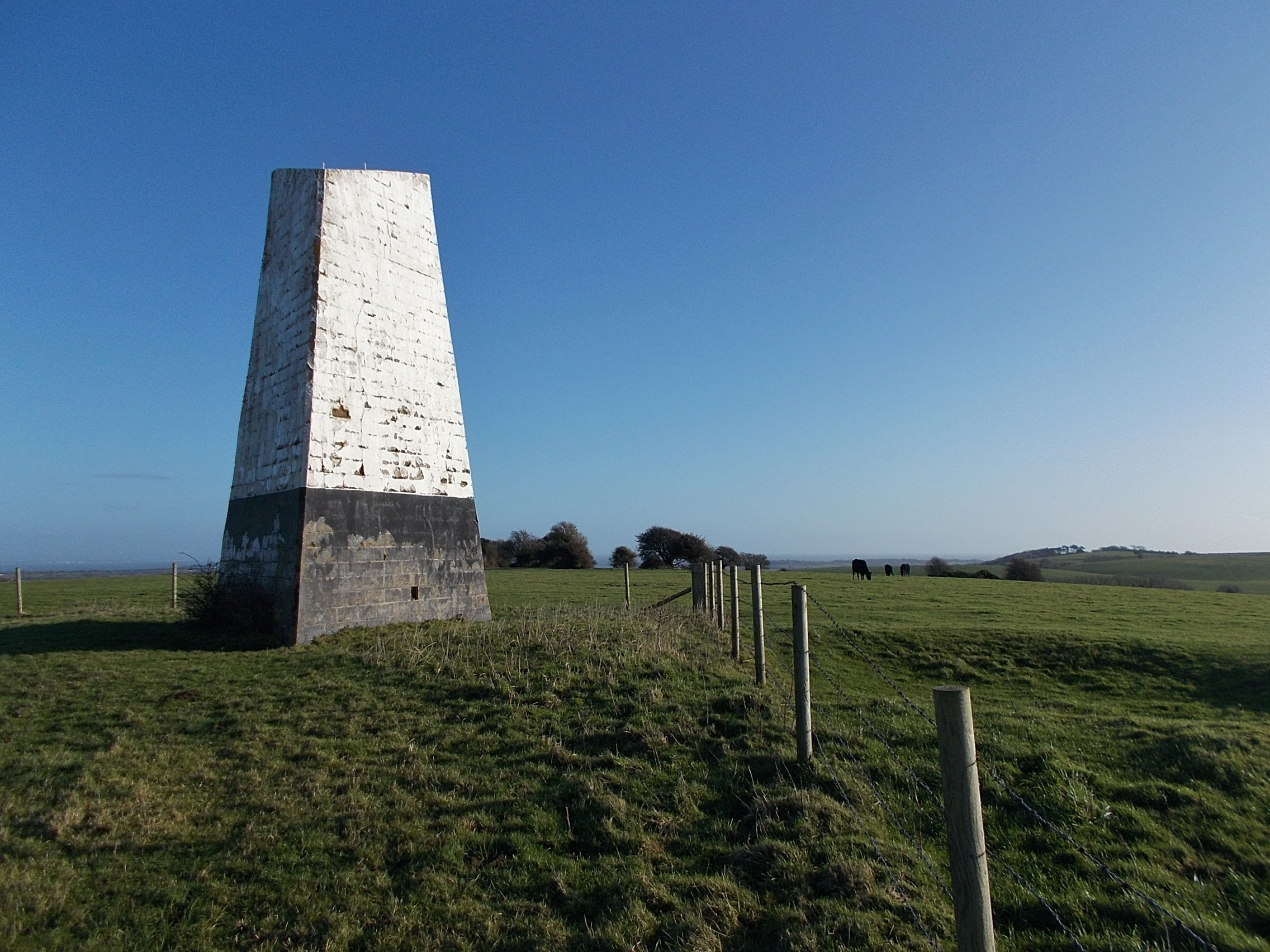
- The sea mark on Ashey Down

- Location within the Isle of Wight
- Area: 12.2692 km^{2} (4.7372 sq mi)
- Population: 737 (2011)
  - Density: 60/km^{2} (160/sq mi)
- OS grid reference: SZ581892
- Civil parish: Havenstreet and Ashey
- Unitary authority: Isle of Wight
- Ceremonial county: Isle of Wight
- Region: South East
- Country: England
- Sovereign state: United Kingdom
- Post town: RYDE
- Postcode district: PO33
- Dialling code: 01983
- Police: Hampshire and Isle of Wight
- Fire: Hampshire and Isle of Wight
- Ambulance: Isle of Wight
- UK Parliament: Isle of Wight East

Ashey is a hamlet and former civil parish, now in the parish of Havenstreet and Ashey, on the outskirts of Ryde, on the Isle of Wight, England. In 1931 the parish had a population of 1499. The parish of Ashey was formed on 31 December 1894 from part of Ryde, on 1 April 1933 the parish was abolished and merged with Ryde and Newchurch.

Ashey is the site every year of an amateur horse race known as the "Isle of Wight Grand National and Ashey Scurry". There are four races that include jumping over fences. It is open to horses and ponies of all sizes and breeds. Riders of all ages enter. It includes a beer tent and betting.

There was a racecourse opened in Ashey in 1884. It included a grandstand as well. It burned down in 1929 and was never rebuilt.

There is a railway station in Ashey, the Ashey railway station, which reopened in 1991 and is between the stations at Havenstreet and Smallbrook Junction. At one time, there was a separate station that serviced the Ashey Racecourse.

There is a manor in East Ashey called the East Ashey Manor. Ashey Down is the site of some ancient burial mounds. The summit of Ashey Down is a good viewpoint and this fact has been gratefully accepted by sailors in their use of the solid, white stump - the Ashey sea mark - which was constructed in 1735. In a variation on the medieval beacon system the Navy built four semaphore stations at key high points on the Island. These relayed to the admiral at Portsmouth details of all shipping seen off the island, and the final messages all passed through Ashey.

There is a story that in 1969, a Dr. White of St Helens and his wife saw some mysterious lights when driving by Ashey Down at night.

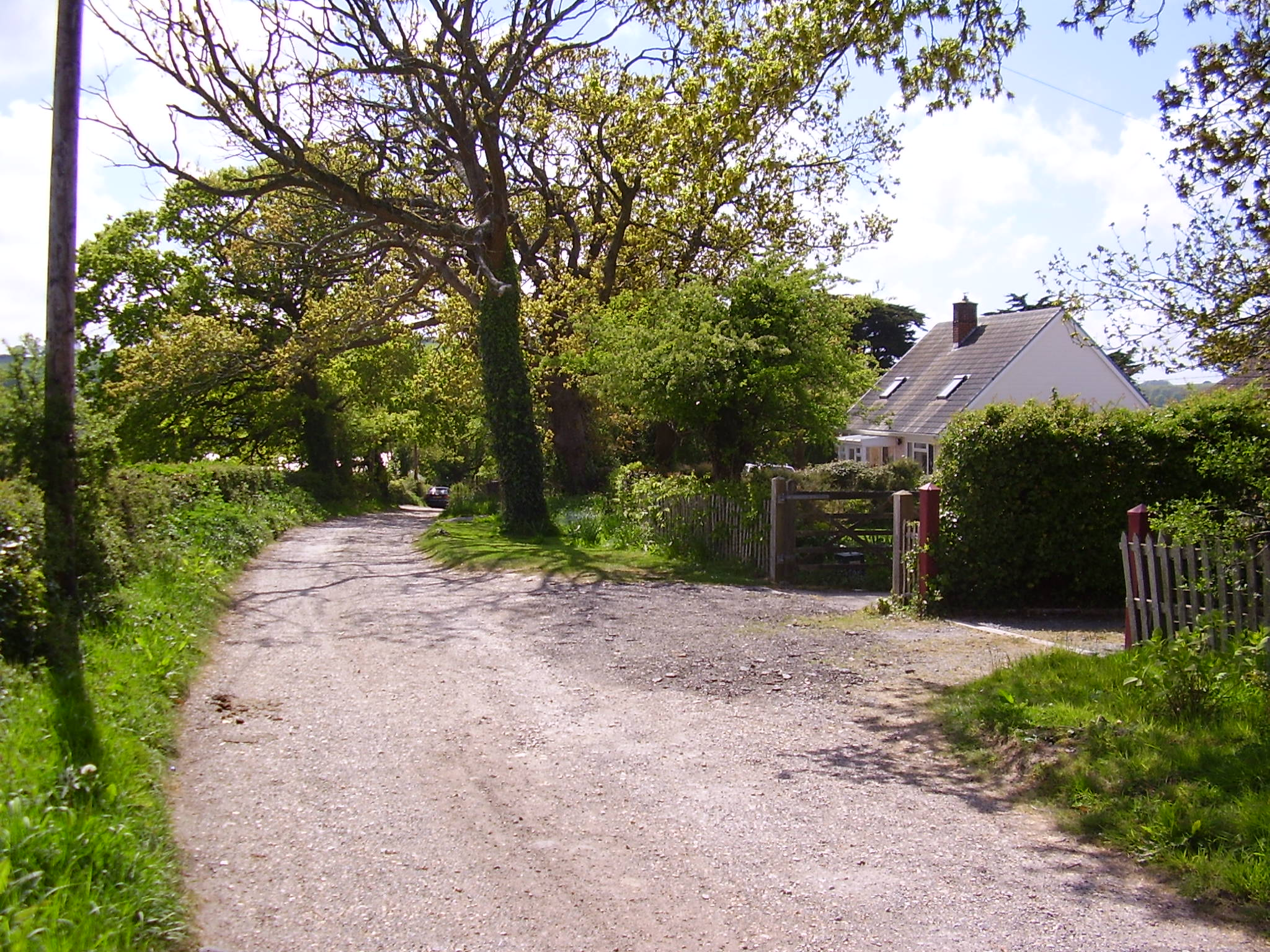
The hamlet of Ashey
