= Wootton Creek =

Tidal estuary of the Isle of Wight, England

Coordinates: 50°44′N 1°14′W

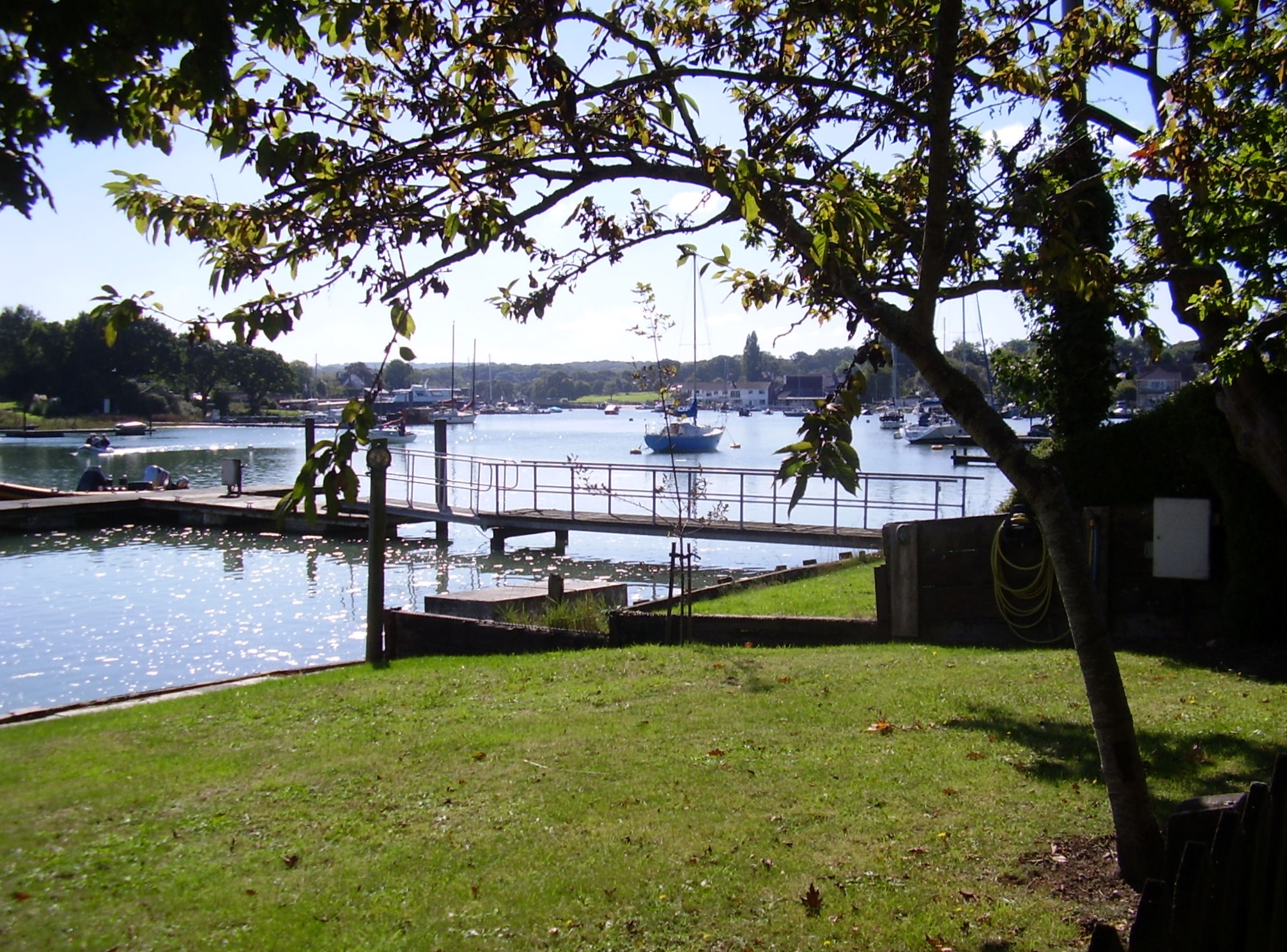
Wootton Creek, looking south towards Wootton Bridge

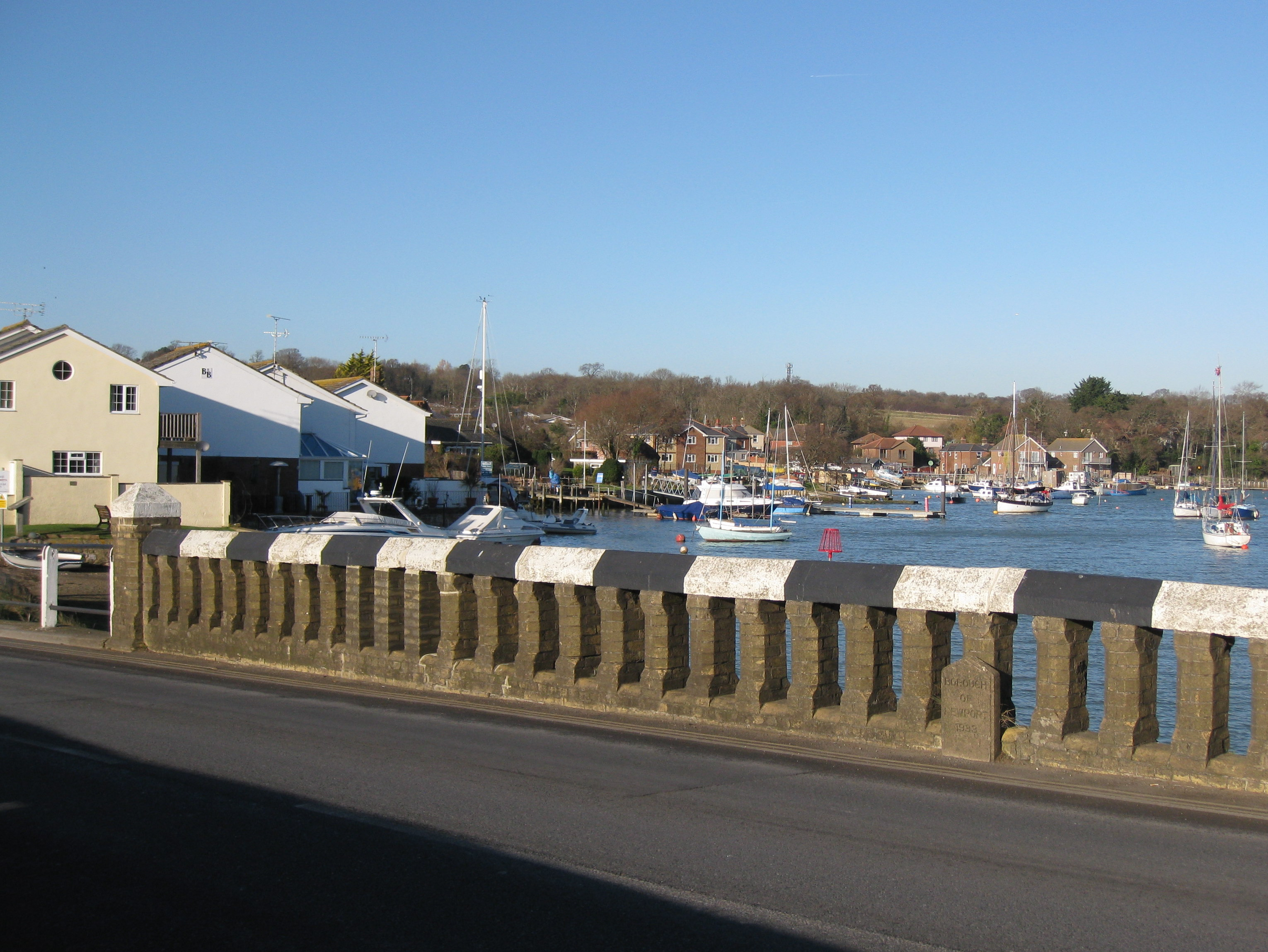
Wootton Creek on a clear winter day in January 2009

Wootton Creek is a tidal estuary that flows into the Solent on the north coast of the Isle of Wight. The estuary has also been known in the past as "Fishbourne Creek", "Wootton River" and "Wootton Haven".

At the mouth of the tidal creek is the Wightlink car ferry terminal for connections to Portsmouth. On the west bank of the creek is the village of Wootton, whilst on the east bank is the village of Fishbourne. The estuary is bridged by the main Ryde to Newport road, where there once was a tide mill. The estuary is not navigable south of the bridge, and tide controls means that water is retained south of the bridge most of the time, in the old mill pond.

To the south of the bridge, on the east side of the mill pond, is a Forestry Commission woodland called "Firestone Copse" which is about 30 acres (120,000 m^{2}) in size.

Since 1993 Wootton Creek and the adjacent Ryde Sands have been designated as SSSIs due to their wide range of intertidal sand flats.
