= Isle of Wight NHS Trust =

Healthcare trust in England

- Area served by the Isle of Wight NHS Trust
- Type: NHS trust
- Established: 1 April 2012
- Headquarters: Newport, Isle of Wight, England
- Region served: Isle of Wight
- Hospitals: St Mary's Hospital
- Chair: Jenni Douglas-Todd
- Chief executive: Penny Emerit
- Staff: 3,887 (2023)
- Website: www.iow.nhs.uk

The Isle of Wight NHS Trust is an NHS trust which provides physical health, mental health and ambulance services for the Isle of Wight. The trust is unique in being the only integrated acute, community, mental health and ambulance health care provider in England. It runs St Mary's Hospital and the Isle of Wight Ambulance Service.

== History ==
The trust was established on 1 April 2012 following the separation of the provider and commissioning functions of the Isle of Wight Primary Care Trust.

The trust formed a strategic partnership with Portsmouth Hospitals University NHS Trust in 2019, aimed at addressing the sustainability of certain small-scale acute services on the Isle of Wight and, as of June 2023, the two trusts share a chair and chief executive.

In 2021, it was announced that the Ambulance Service will follow a new five year strategy that will see it having a closer working relationship and support from South Central Ambulance Service.

== Acute care ==
In January 2018, the CCG proposed that Isle of Wight patients needing high risk and complex emergency and elective surgery should in future be treated in Portsmouth and Southampton. Some outpatient appointments could be conducted remotely. The trust has established an emergency care hub at the hospital where social workers have joined ambulance crews, mental health teams and district nurses are based together. The social work service established in the A&E department has been held out as an example to follow, because it has significantly reduced the number of hospital admissions.

It is using the South Central Ambulance Service's computer system for ambulance dispatches to improve the performance of the ambulance service on the island.

The trust was one of the beneficiaries of Boris Johnson's announcement of capital funding for the NHS in August 2019, with an allocation of £48 million for redesign of acute services.

== Performance ==
The trust ended the financial year 2015/16 with a deficit of £8.4M. In April 2017, it was put into special measures after a Care Quality Commission (CQC) inspection rated it inadequate, finding "unsafe" mental health services, widespread understaffing and a "subtle culture of bullying". Maggie Oldham, was appointed chief executive in May 2017, having performed the same role at Mid Staffordshire NHS Foundation Trust.

It recorded 277 serious incidents in 2018 and 2019, compared to 143 in the previous two years. Delays in treatment accounted for 22%. This was after a new executive team in 2018 encouraged staff to report all incidents.

In December 2019, it was the fourth worst performing trust in England against the four-hour A&E target, with only 48% of patients seen within four hours, and had the longest waits for emergency ambulances.

In 2021, it performed best on all of the main quality and safety-related questions in the mental health section of the annual NHS Staff Survey.

In September 2021 the trust was rated "good" following an inspection by the CQC and taken out of special measures after four years.

== Mental health ==
The Sevenacres mental health unit was criticised by CQC inspectors in November 2013 because patients were unclear about their care plans and were not always involved in decisions about their care or treatment.

In November 2014, the trust established a 'strategic estates partnership' with Ryhurst, a property management company in a deal which could be worth up to £25M. It is planned to rationalise the existing 21 sites over which the trust operates and have some community care hubs.

== Integration ==
The Isle of Wight NHS was one of the areas selected to pilot Integrated primary and acute care systems under the Five Year Forward View in 2015. The scheme was entitled "My Life a Full Life" and involved the Isle of Wight Council, the Clinical Commissioning Group and the local GP collaborative One Wight Health.

The trust's Discharge Facilitation Service was highly commended at the 2021 Municipal Journal Local Government Achievement Awards for its success in bringing people home sooner from hospital admissions.

== See also ==
- List of NHS trusts
