= Cowleaze Chine =

Cowleaze Chine on the Isle of Wight

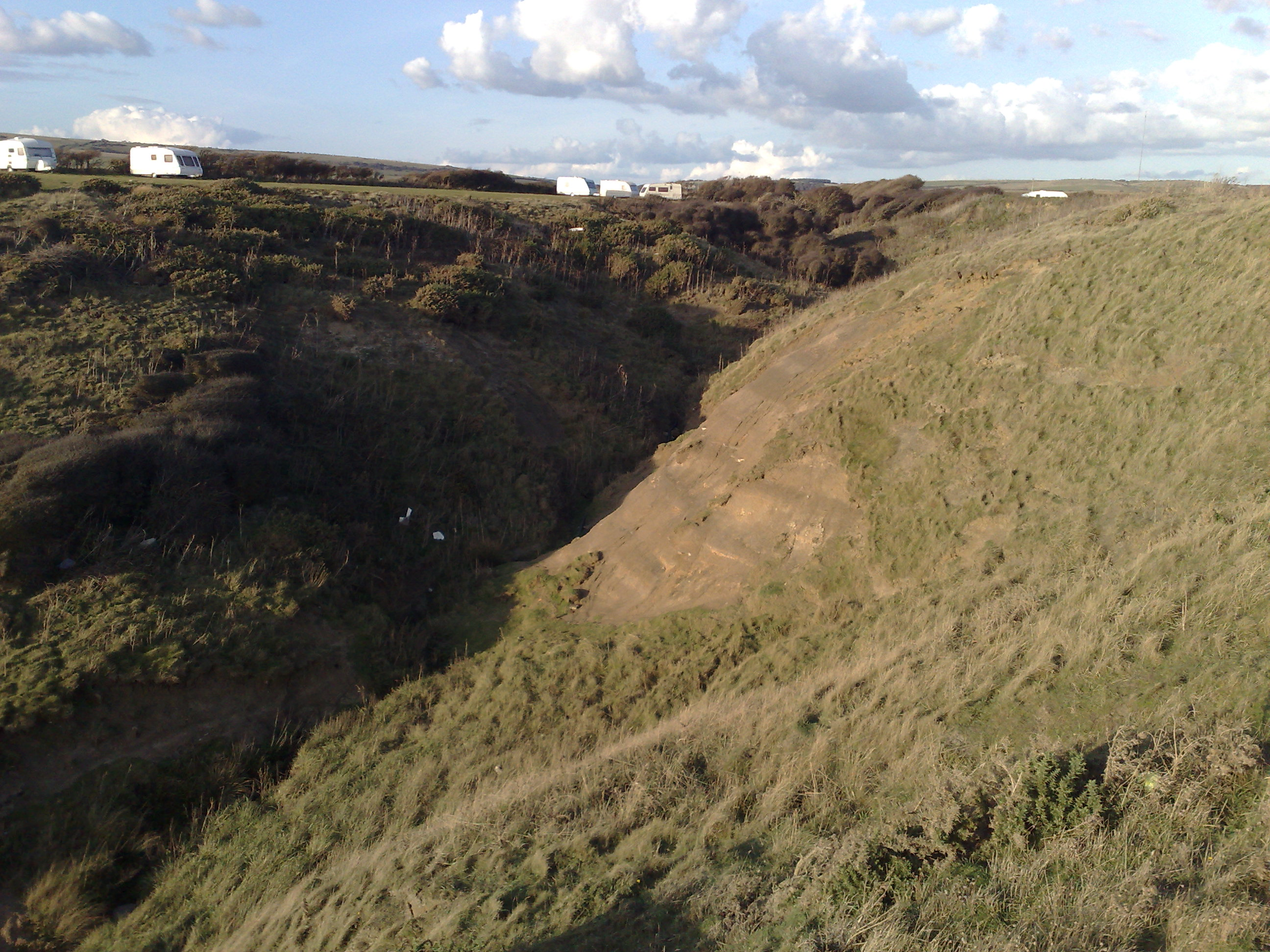
Cowleaze Chine

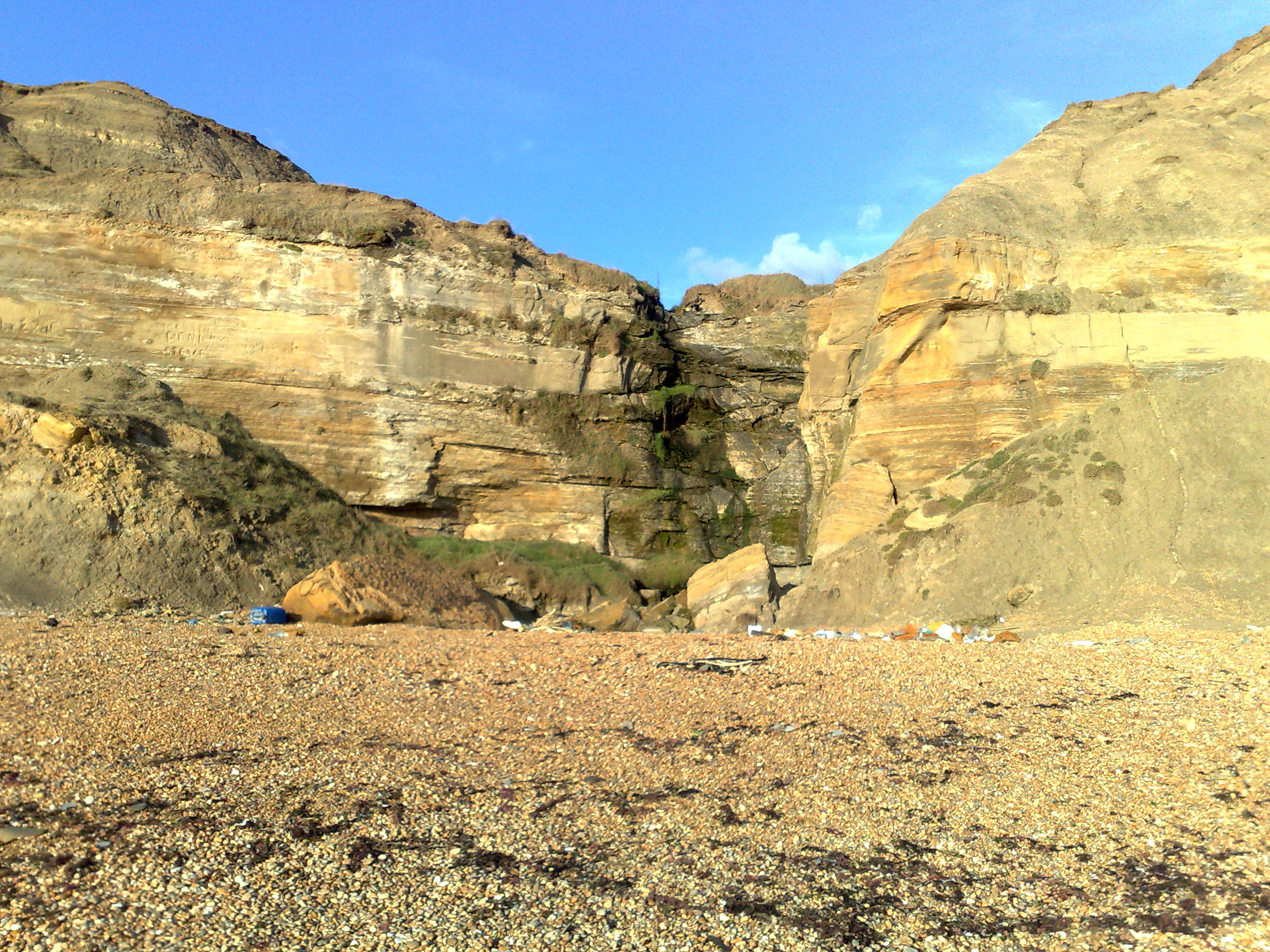
Cowleaze Chine from the beach

Cowleaze Chine (also Cowlease Chine) is a geological feature on the south west coast of the Isle of Wight, England. It lies to the west of the village of Little Atherfield.

This chine is just to the west of the larger Shepherd's Chine. It starts just off the side of the A3055 Military Road and runs south west for about 250m to reach the beach at Brighstone Bay just to the north of Atherfield Point.

== Flora ==
This chine's vegetation is a mixture of hardy bushes, scrub and rough grasses. At the widest part of the chine erosion and layers of grey sediment are visible.

== Water ==
The Chine drains water from the mainly flat agricultural land to its north. The resulting stream reaches the coast at the top of a small cliff and falls the remaining 5 metres to the beach below where it soaks into the pebbles and disappears. Originally the Chine would have been fed by the flow of water that now supplies neighbouring Shepherd's Chine.

== Location ==
To the east of Cowleaze Chine is the Atherfield Bay Holiday Centre consisting of a campsite and chalets.

The Isle of Wight Coastal Path crosses Cowleaze Chine near the campsite.
