= Chine =

Steep-sided coastal gorge in central southern England

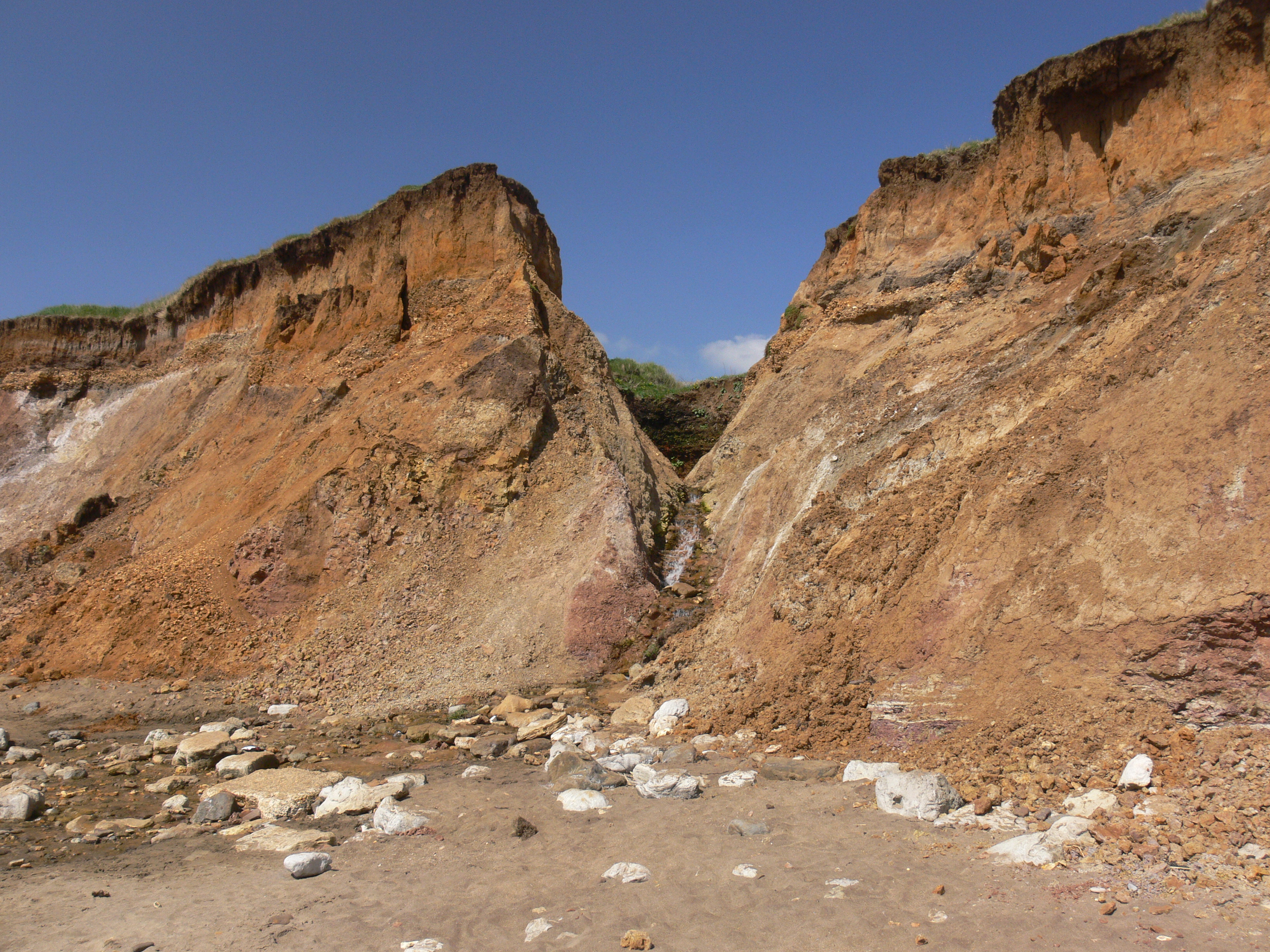
Chine forming on soft cliffs at Compton, Isle of Wight

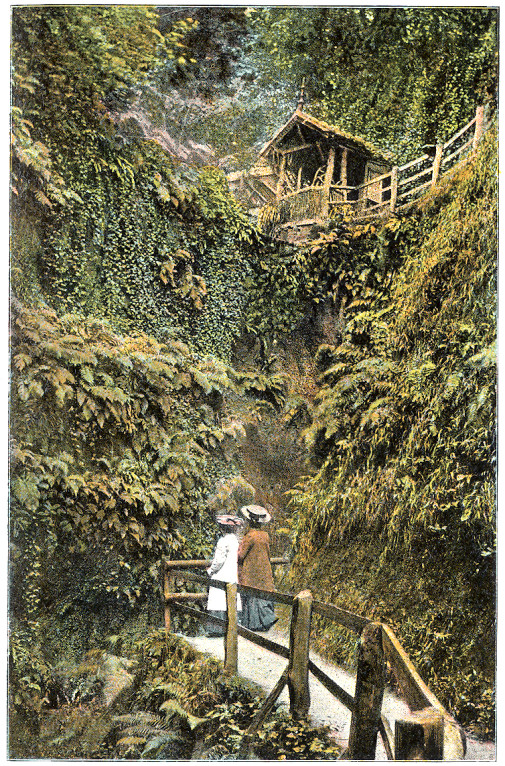
Shanklin Chine, circa 1910.

A chine ( /ˈtʃaɪn/) is a steep-sided coastal gorge where a river flows to the sea through, typically, soft eroding cliffs of sandstone or clays. The word is used in central Southern England—notably in East Devon, Dorset, Hampshire and the Isle of Wight—to describe such topographical features. The term 'bunny' is sometimes used to describe a chine in Hampshire. The term chine is also used in some Vancouver suburbs in Canada to describe similar features.

The word chine derives from the Old English cinu, meaning 'a gorge, a ravine'.

== Formation and features ==
Chines appear at the outlet of small river valleys when a particular combination of geology, stream volume, and coastal recession rate creates a knickpoint, usually starting at a waterfall at the cliff edge, that initiates rapid erosion and deepening of the stream bed into a gully leading down to the sea.

All chines are in a state of constant change due to erosion. The Blackgang Chine on the Isle of Wight, for example, has been destroyed by landslides and coastal erosion during the 20th century. As the walls of the chines and cliffs are so unstable and erode continually, particularly those of the south coast of the Isle of Wight, the strata are clearly visible. Chines are, therefore, very important for their fossil records, their archaeology and the unique flora and fauna, such as invertebrates and rare insects, for which they provide shelter.

== On the UK mainland ==
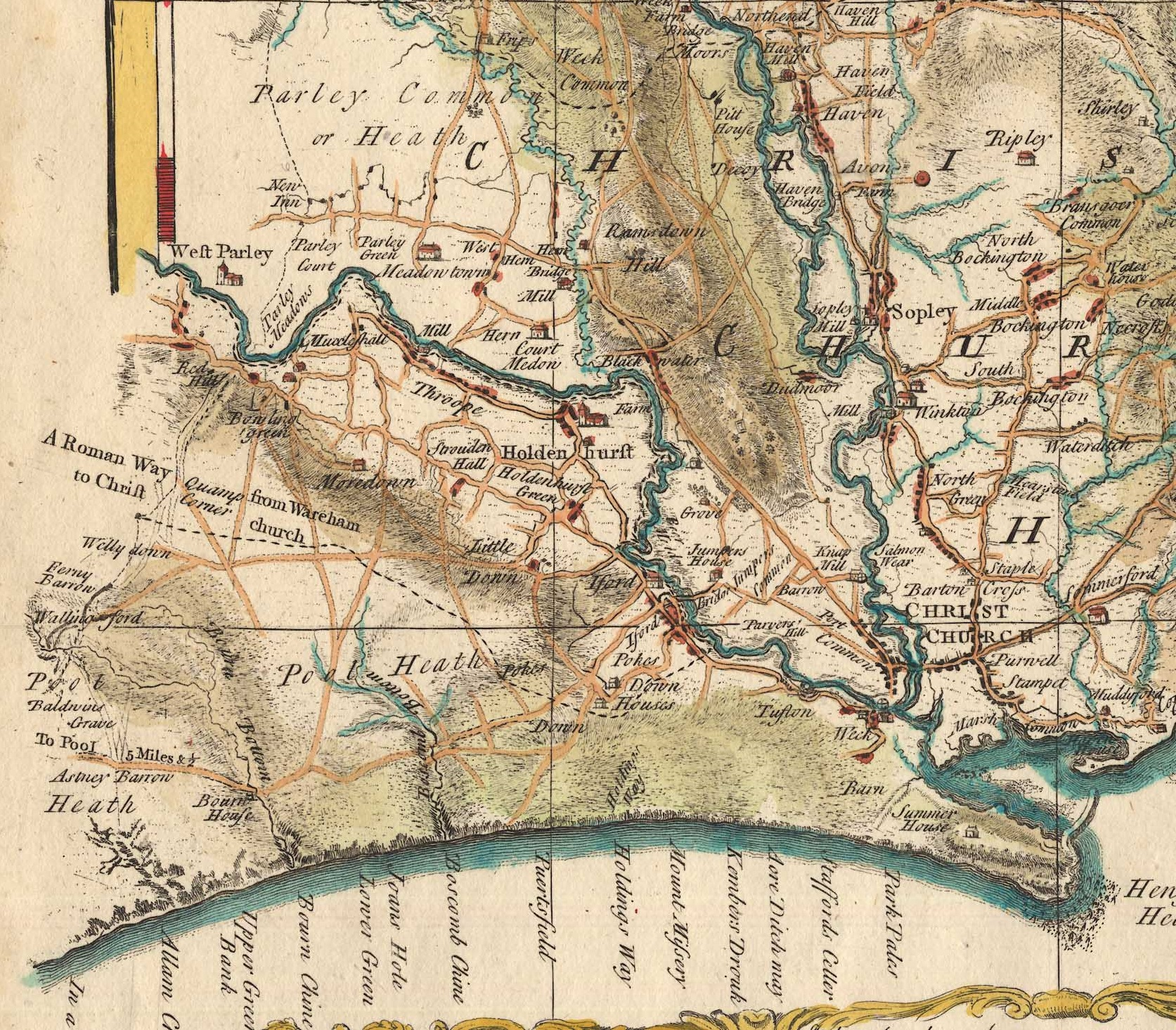
Section of a 1759 map of Hampshire by Isaac Taylor, showing several chines between Christchurch and Poole (including Bourne Chine, the future location of Bournemouth town centre).

In Devon, Sherbrooke Chine is west of Budleigh Salterton, and Seaton Chine is at the western end of the West Walk esplanade, Seaton. In Dorset, west of Bournemouth are found Flaghead Chine, Branksome Chine, Alum Chine, Middle Chine and Durley Chine, and east towards Boscombe, Boscombe Chine and Honeycombe Chine. Bournemouth Town Centre itself is built in the former Bourne Chine (the Pleasure Gardens being the original valley floor), although urban development since the late 19th century has altered the topography somewhat. Becton Bunny and Chewton Bunny are other examples of chines near Barton on Sea, Hampshire ("Bunny" being the New Forest equivalent to "Chine"). In Ramsgate, Kent, there is Courtstairs Chine, leading from the cliff top to the undercliff promenade.

A rare example of the use of 'Chine' in a non-coastal setting is Chineham, a civil parish near Basingstoke.

== On the Isle of Wight ==
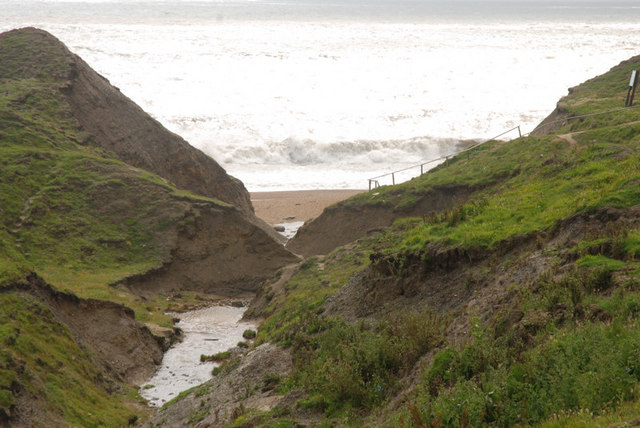
Shepherd's Chine, Isle of Wight

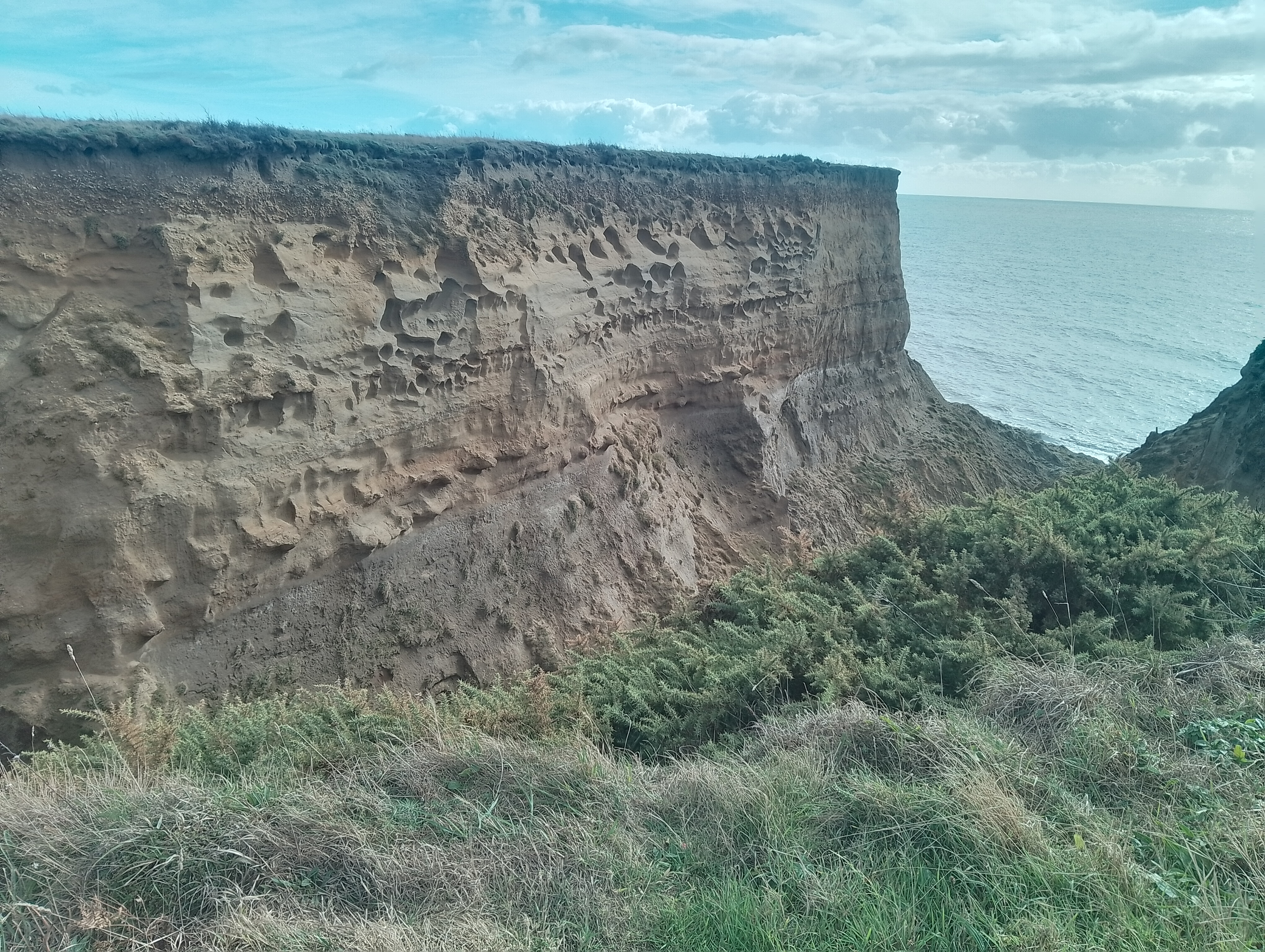
Whale Chine, Isle of Wight

There are twenty chines on the Isle of Wight, to which fascinating folklore is attached because of their history with local smuggling, fishing and shipwrecks. The popular tourist attraction of Shanklin Chine is also famous for its involvement in the Second World War, when it was used to carry one of the Operation Pluto pipelines and as training area for the 40 Royal Marine Commando battalion before the 1942 Dieppe Raid.

Geologically, the chines in Alum Bay, in Totland (Widdick Chine), and the three in Colwell Bay (Colwell Chine, Brambles Chine and Linstone Chine) are in Tertiary rocks. The remainder on the island's south coast are in Cretaceous rocks.

An inventory of chines on the Isle of Wight follows, listing chines clockwise from Cowes:

=== South-east coast ===
- Small Hope Chine
- Shanklin Chine
- Luccombe Chine

=== South-west coast ===
- Blackgang Chine (now destroyed)
- New Chine
- Walpen Chine or Old Walpen Chine
- Ladder Chine
- Whale Chine
- Shepherd's Chine
- Cowleaze Chine
- Barnes Chine
- Grange/Marsh Chine
- Chilton Chine
- Brook Chine
- Churchill Chine
- Shippards Chine
- Compton Chine

=== North-west coast ===
- Alum Bay Chine
- Widdick Chine
- Colwell Chine
- Brambles Chine
- Linstone Chine

== In Canada ==
The Vancouver suburb of Coquitlam has a neighbourhood called Harbour Chines that was built in the 1950s, along with the adjoining neighbourhood of Chineside to the east. Both are situated upon the tops of cliffs that overlook a large number of streams flowing down to the adjoining suburb of Port Moody's Chines Park, from where they flow to Burrard Inlet, onwards out to the Georgia Strait of the Salish Sea, and the Pacific Ocean.

== See also ==
- Ravine
- Gulch
- Gully
