= Brambles Chine =

Chine on the Isle of Wight

Coordinates: 50.694°N 1.534°W

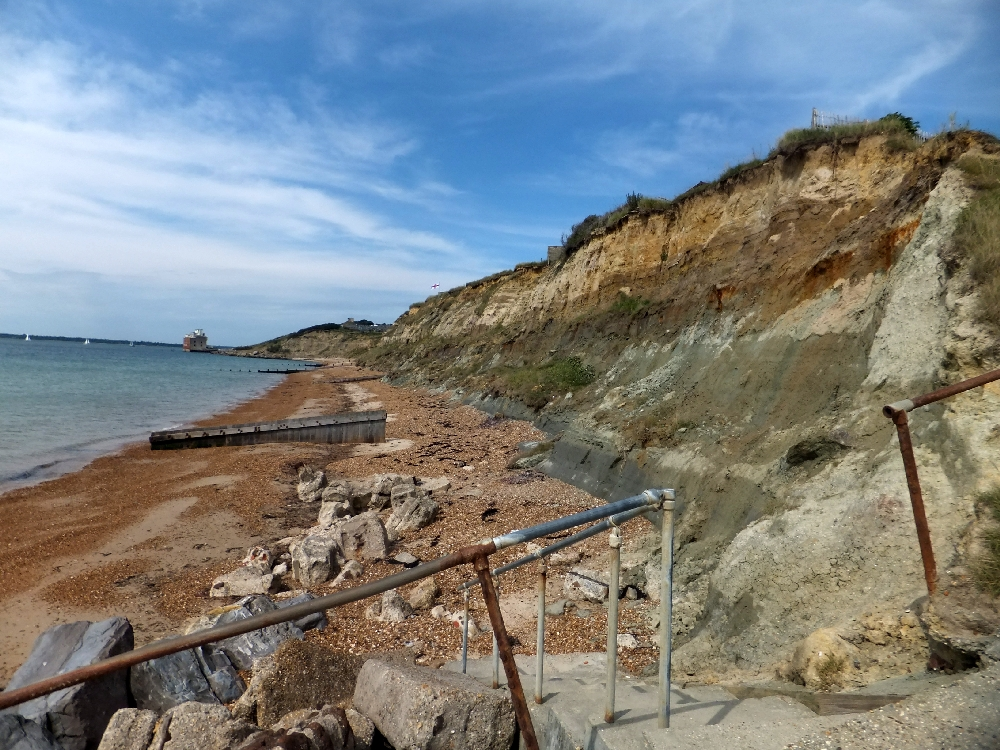
View from Brambles Chine

Brambles Chine on the Isle of Wight

Brambles Chine is a chine in Colwell Bay, Isle of Wight, England notable for its geology. After years of erosion, a path down to the beach near Brambles Chine was destroyed, but rebuilt in 2023.

The chine is accessible from the coastal path. A slipway is where the chine bed used to be.

== Name ==
Named from a place called Brambles on Andrew's Map of 1769, and perhaps associated with Bramblehill (1608), the origin of the name is from Lazarus Bramble, a master mariner from Yarmouth that owned the chine in 1648. The word chine is from Old English cinu (fissure, ravine).

There is a self-catering holiday village and a park near the chine with the same name.

== Location ==
It is located in Colwell Bay, near the villages of Freshwater and Totland. There is a small, unnamed copse of trees surrounding the chine. In the bay, there are two other chines: Linstone Chine to the north, and Colwell Chine to the south.

The geology consists of the sands and clays of the Headon Hill Formation. It was one of the areas investigated in the 17th Century by Robert Hooke.
