= Compton Chine =

Compton Chine on the Isle of Wight

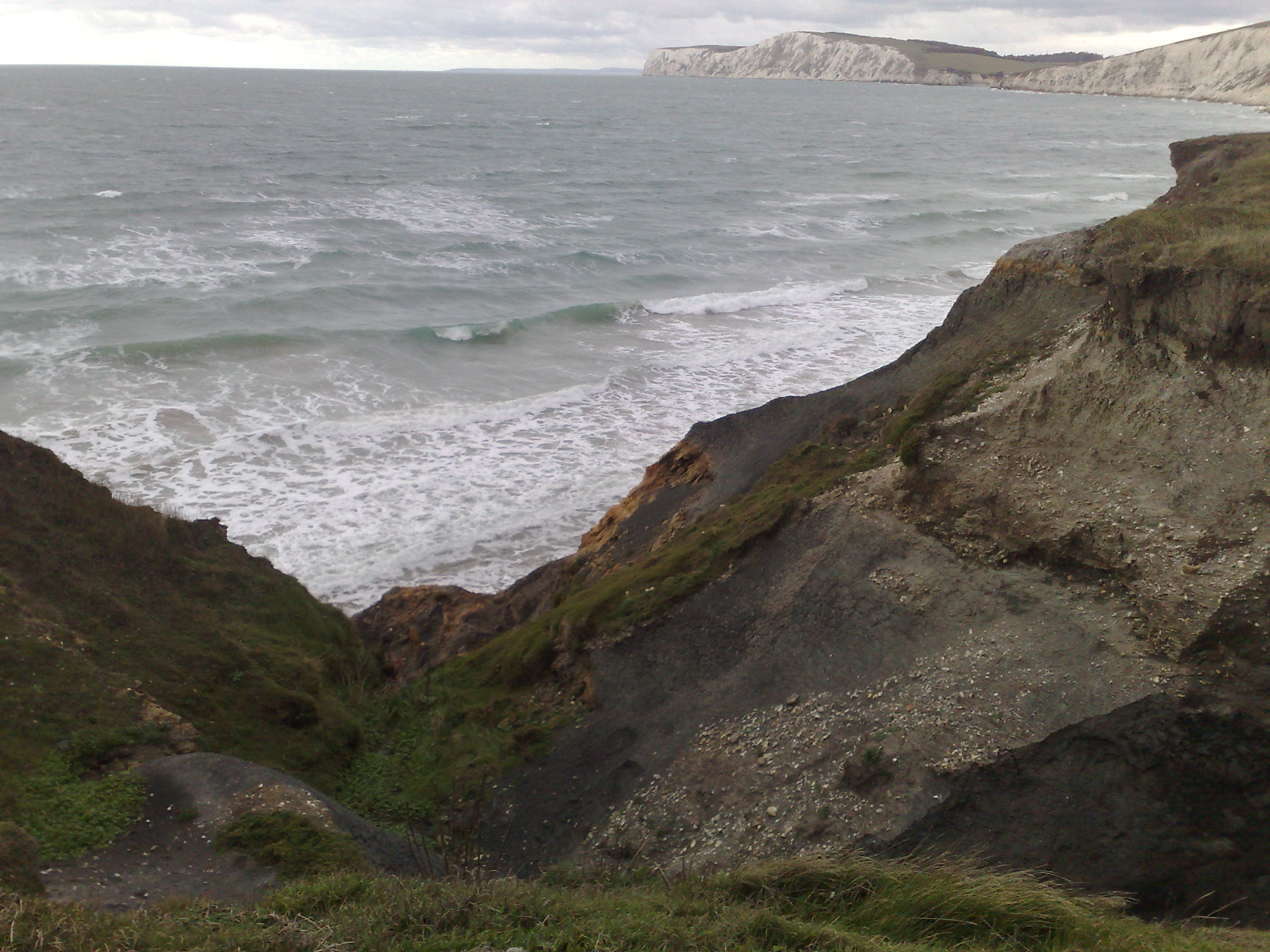
Compton Chine

Compton Chine is a geological feature on the south west coast of the Isle of Wight, England. It lies between the village of Brook to the east and Freshwater Bay to the west. It is a small sandy coastal gully, one of a number of such chines on the island created by stream erosion of soft Cretaceous rocks. It leads from the 50 foot high clifftop to the beach of Compton Bay.

The Chine drains water off the slopes of Compton Down, to the north, into the sea.

The Isle of Wight Coastal Path crosses the top of the chine via a small footbridge.
