= Chale Bay =

Bay on the Isle of Wight, England

Coordinates: 50°35′42″N 1°19′56″W

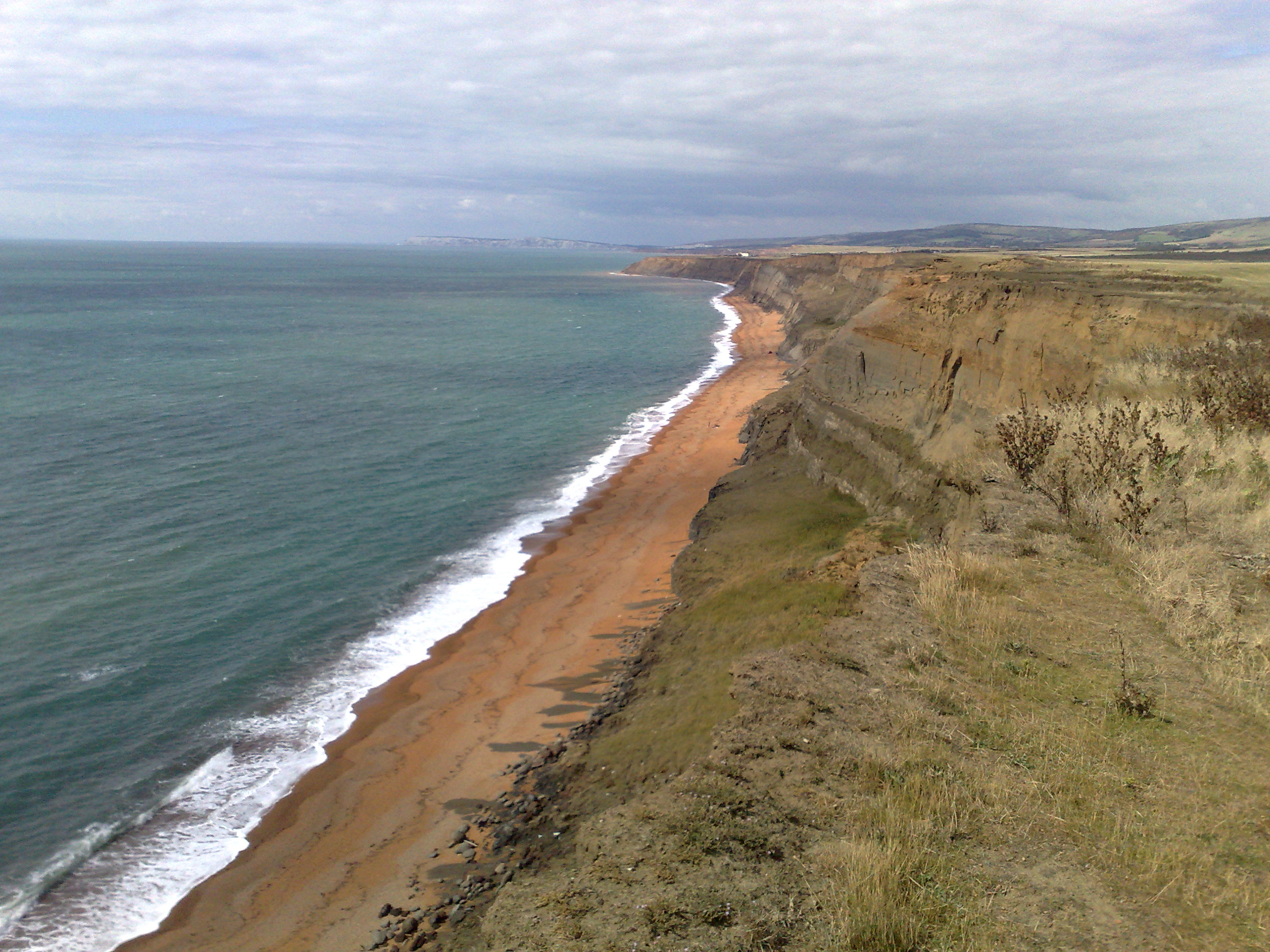
- Chale Bay looking to the north-west

- Location within the Isle of Wight
- Civil parish: Chale
- Ceremonial county: Isle of Wight
- Region: South East
- Country: England
- Sovereign state: United Kingdom

Chale Bay is a bay on the south-west coast of the Isle of Wight, England. It lies to the west of the village of Chale from which it takes its name. It faces south-west towards the English Channel, its shoreline is 3 1/4 miles (5.2 km) in length and is gently curving. It stretches from Artherfield Point in the north-west to Rocken End in the south-east.

The bay is best viewed from the car park on the A3055 above Blackgang Chine or anywhere along the Isle of Wight Coastal Path which follows the whole coastline along the clifftop. Since the closure of the steps at Whale Chine, the beach at Chale Bay has become somewhat inaccessible, with no way down from the clifftop anywhere along its three miles. Parts of the beach are sometimes used by naturists, who are known locally as "Blackgang Bares".

== Geography ==
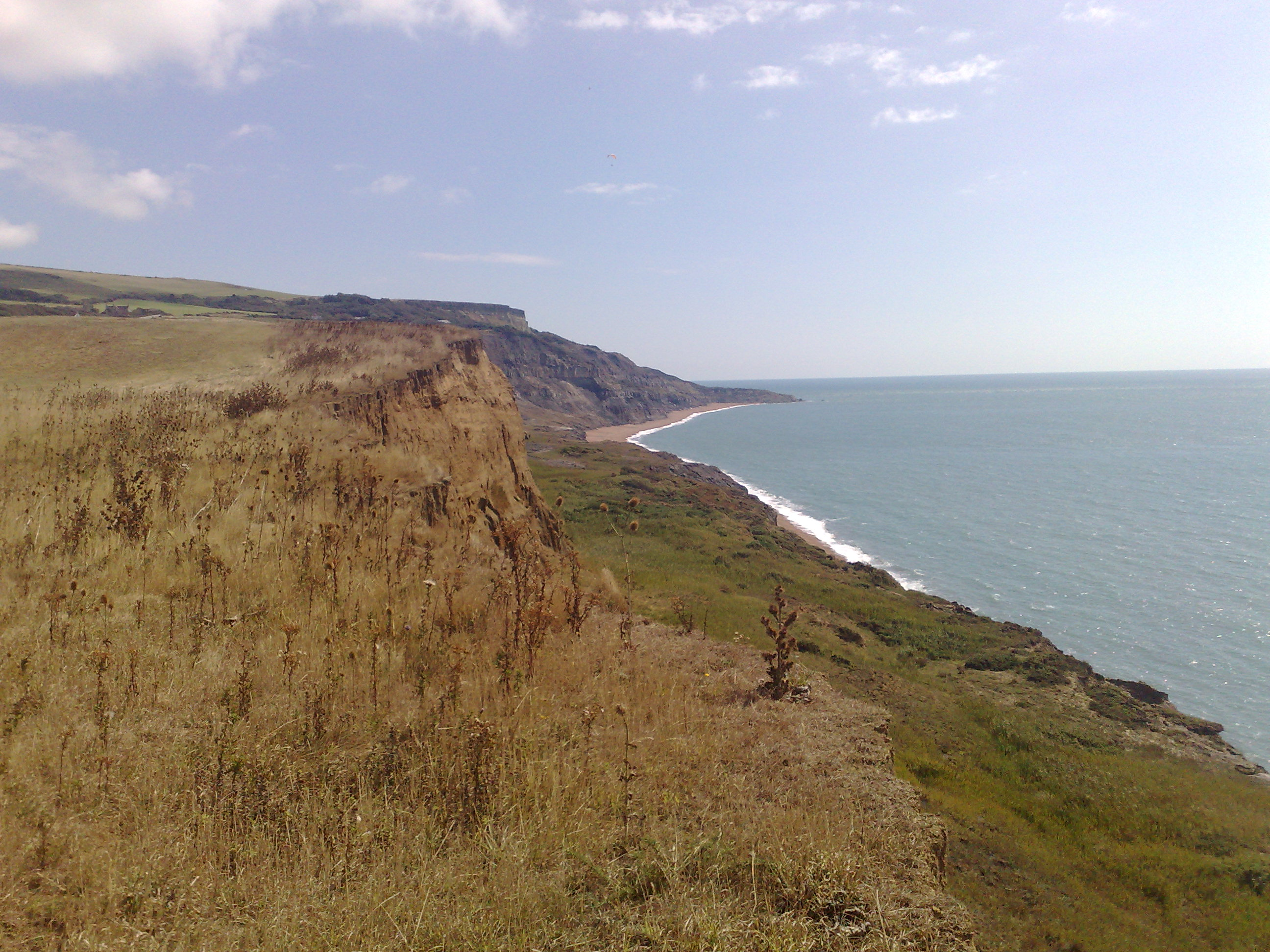
Chale Bay looking to the south-east

The beach is predominantly shingle and is bordered by tall cliffs which are made of sandstone, chalk and clay and so are often subject to erosion. There are a number of coastal chines and ravines around the bay; most notably Whale Chine, Blackgang Chine and Walpen Chine. The bay's eastern end is the site of Shag Rock which is a boulder around the size of a small building, though a storm in 1980 shifted it from its once prominent position on the shoreline.

When approaching from the west, the bay marks a change in the type of coastline of the island to a rockbound shore which is unsuitable for landing vessels; this sort of coastline stretches until Sandown Bay. The seabed is a mixture of mud, sand and shells.

== Shipwrecks ==
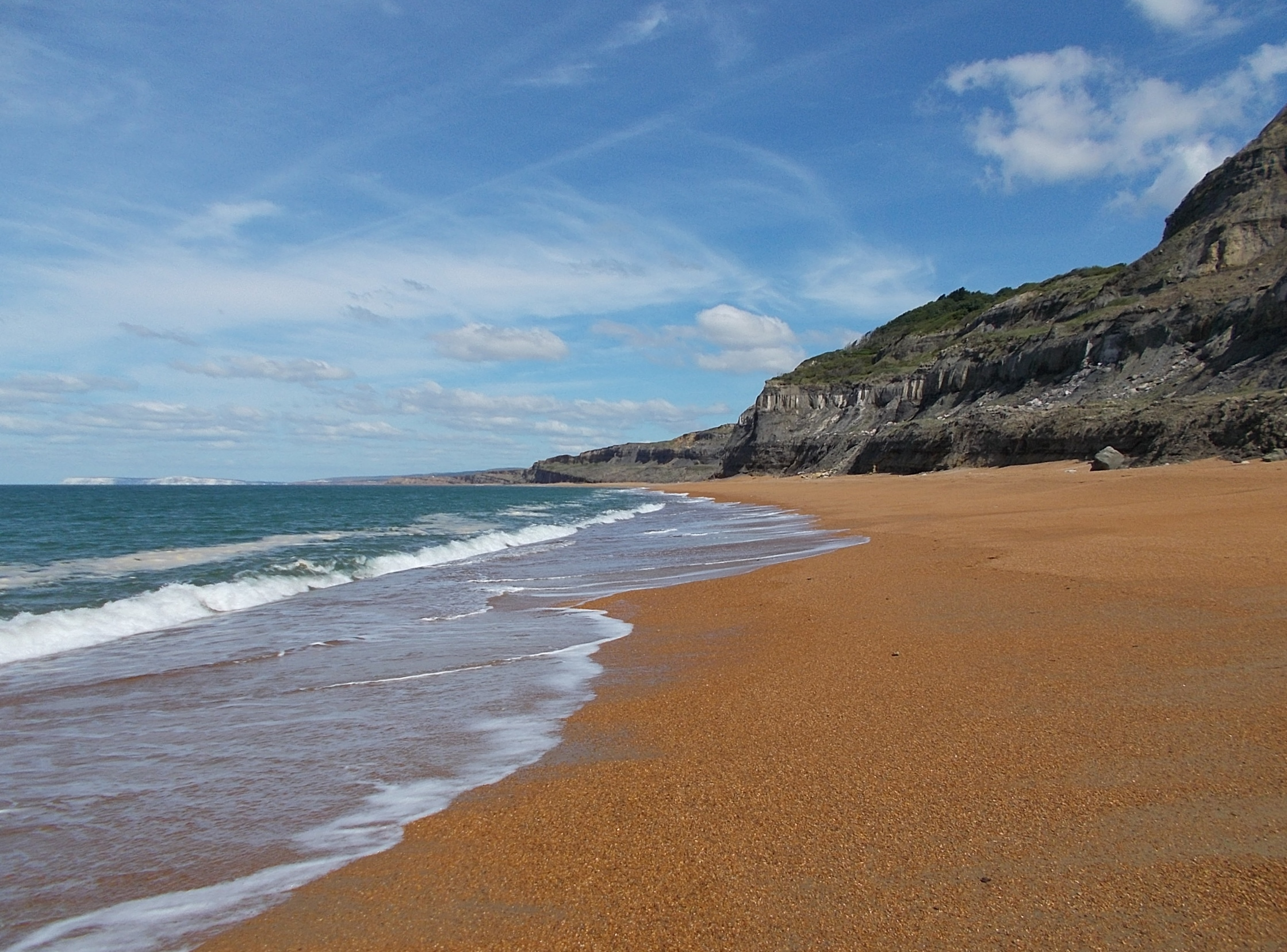
The beach at Chale Bay, looking north-west from the south-east end

In 1314 the St. Mary, out of Bayonne, France, with a cargo of white wine from Aquitaine was wrecked at the west end of the bay.

The wreck of the Wheatfield steamer, which beached on New Year's Eve in 1882, lies around 200 yards west of Shag Rock. The 1,200-ton steamship broke up on the rocks after her crew escaped in their lifeboats, no fatalities were recorded but, her cargo (which included tinned meat and flour) was lost. After the wreck, a number of locals were fined for being in the position of cargo salvaged from the ship.

In 1996, a 75-foot sailing boat was washed ashore by high waves generated from the arrival of Hurricane Lili. All five of her passengers were rescued by the local lifeboat service.
