= Widdick Chine =

Chine on the Isle of Wight, England

- Gully
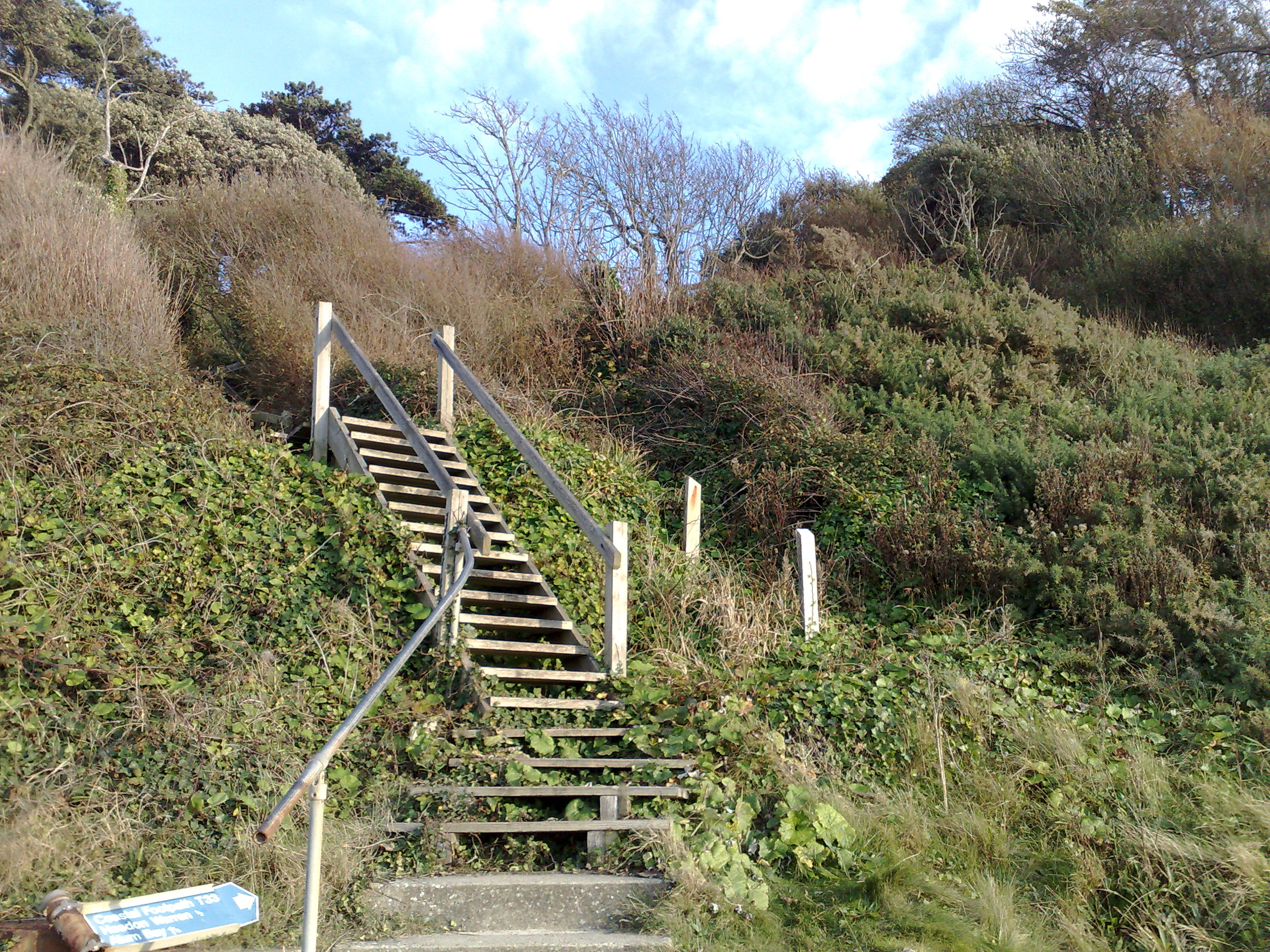

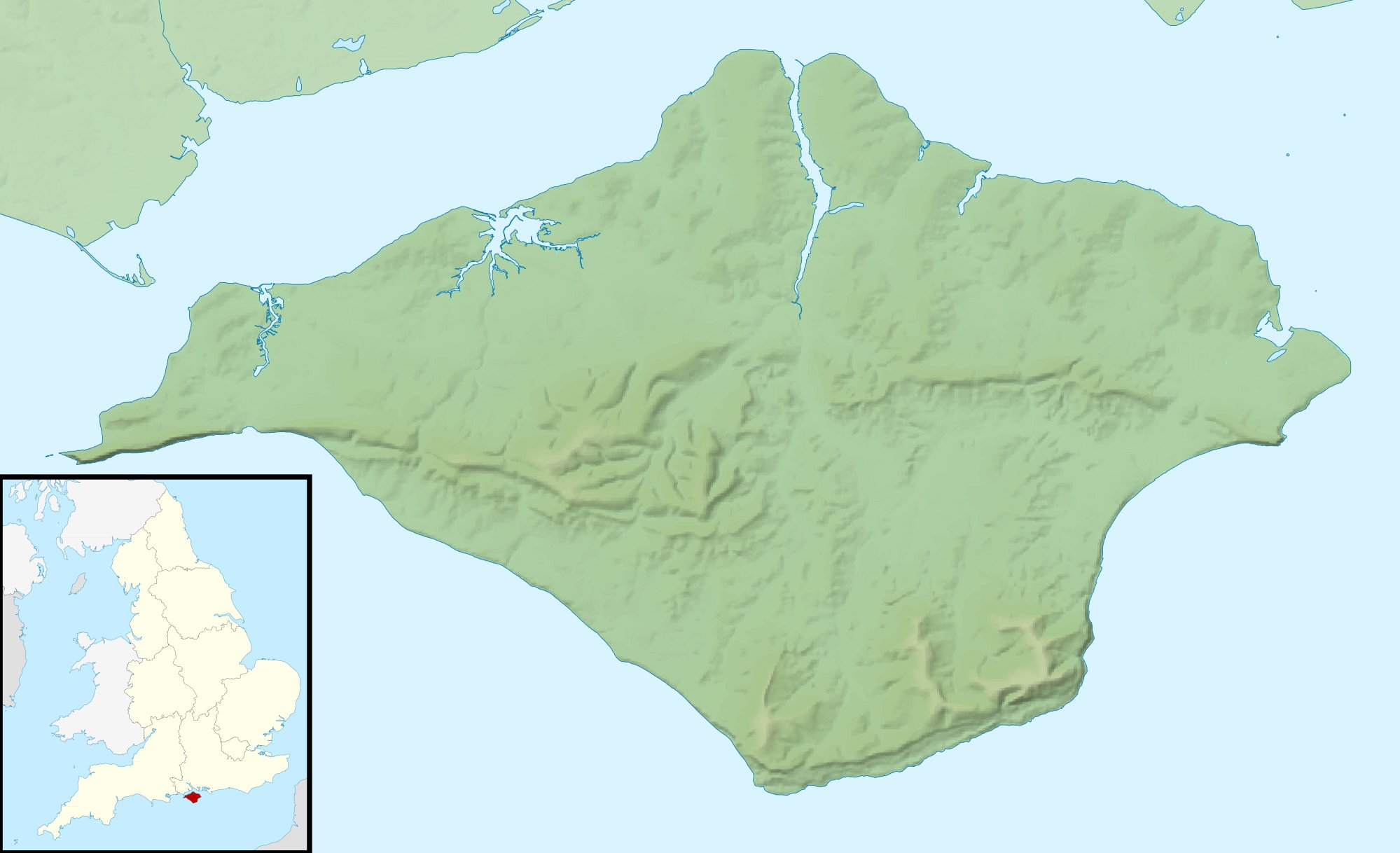
- Location on Isle of Wight
- Coordinates: 50.678365°N 1.547907°W
- Location: Isle of Wight

Widdick Chine is a geological feature on the west coast of the Isle of Wight, England. It is west of the village of Totland.

It is a steep coastal gully, which is overgrown with vegetation. The water that used to flow down the slope has been redirected through a pipe which takes it to beach level to reduce its effect on erosion to the cliff. A set of steps have been constructed down the chine to provide access from Totland to the beach of Totland Bay.

The Chine pipe drains water from the northern slopes of Tennyson Down.

The Isle of Wight Coastal Path passes up the steps of the chine. At the bottom of the chine is the old Totland lifeboat house.

== Name ==
The current name is probably from the surname Withick, but it used to be called Whytflyde chyne (1550) Whytewill Chine (1559), probably with a similar origin to Whitwell: 'the white or clean spring'

1837: Widdick
