= Barnes Chine =

Geological feature

Barnes Chine on the Isle of Wight

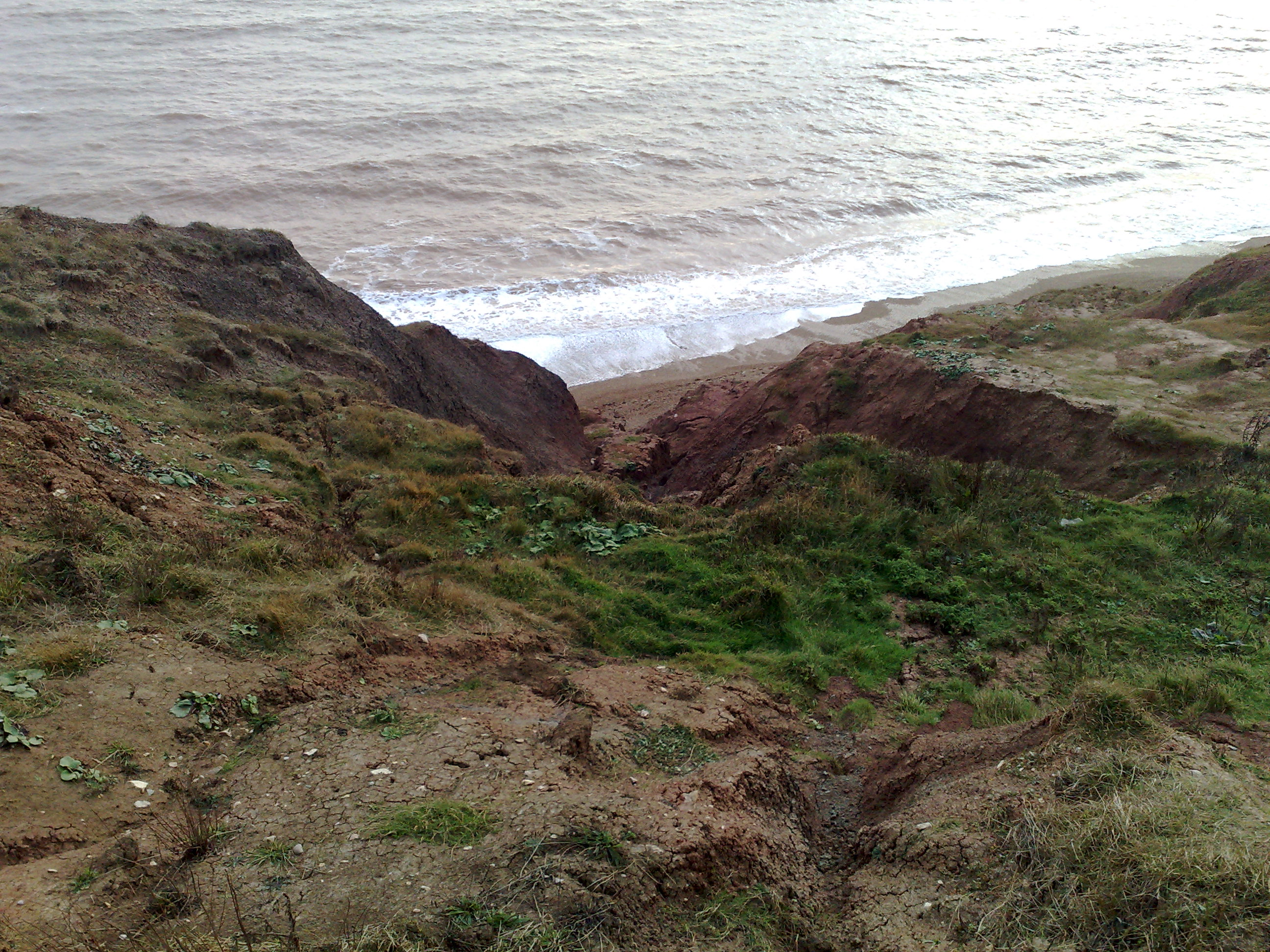
Barnes Chine

Barnes Chine is a geological feature on the south west coast of the Isle of Wight, England. The chine lies just to the west of a small rise called Barnes High and south west of the hamlet of Yafford. It is a small sandy coastal ravine, one of a number of such chines on the island created by erosion of the cliff edge made of soft Cretaceous rock.

This chine is difficult to identify as there is no obvious stream valley leading to the cliff edge, just a slight undulation of the gently sloping agricultural land. At the bottom of the undulation look over the cliff edge to see a small v-shaped gully descending rapidly to the beach below. The erosion of this chine is by underwater streams which emerge below the cliff top. The water probably comes from a small pond about 150m from the cliff edge near the A3055's Military Road and from the small catchment area to the west of Barnes High.

The Isle of Wight Coastal Path runs past the top of the chine.

== History ==
Flint work dating from the Bronze Age through to the Mesolithic have been found as the result of archaeological excavations on the site. Roman era pottery and building materials have been excavated suggesting there was a Roman building on or close to the site.
