= Shepherd's Chine =

River valley in England

Shepherd's Chine on the Isle of Wight

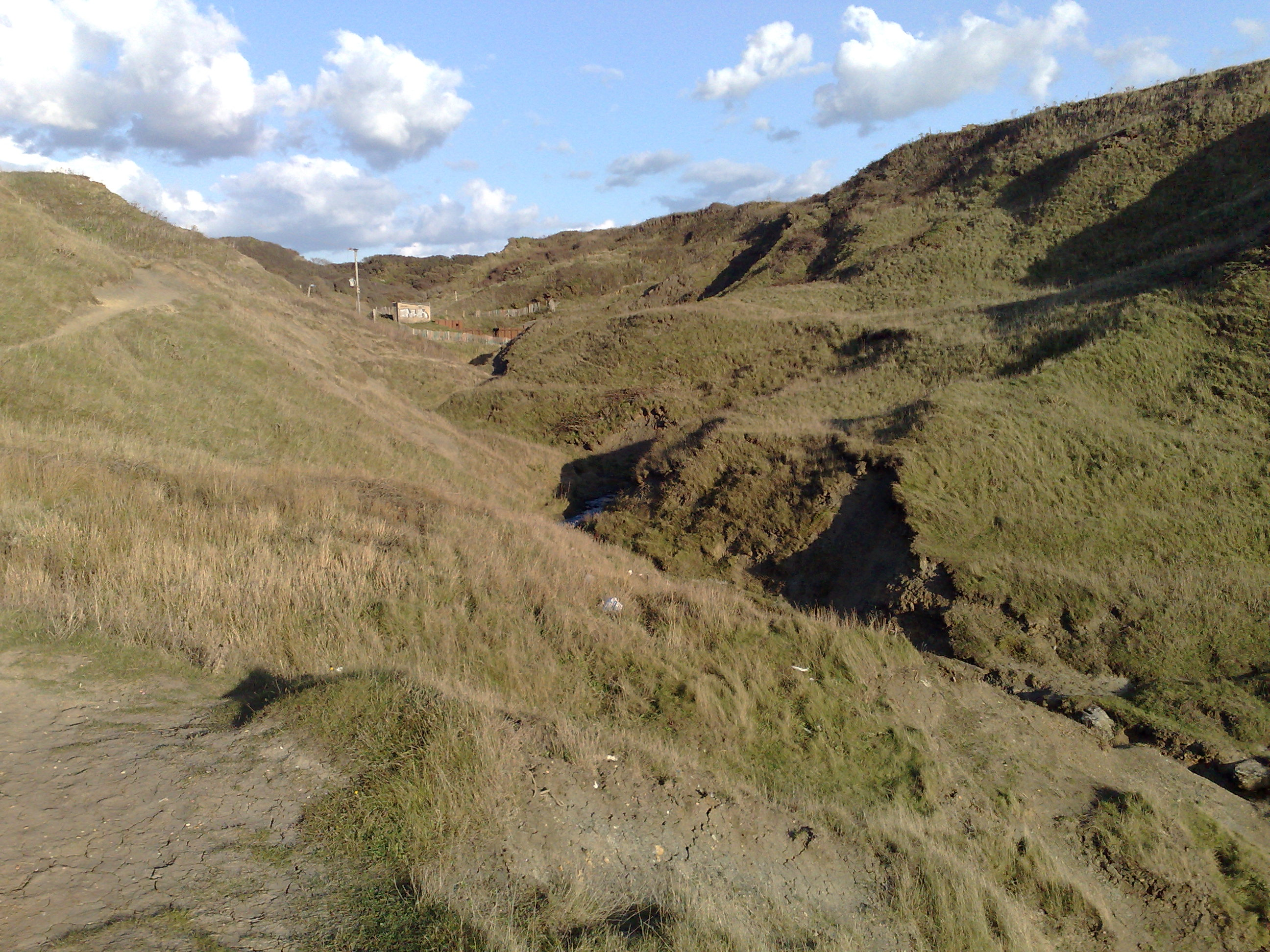
Shepherd's Chine with pumping house

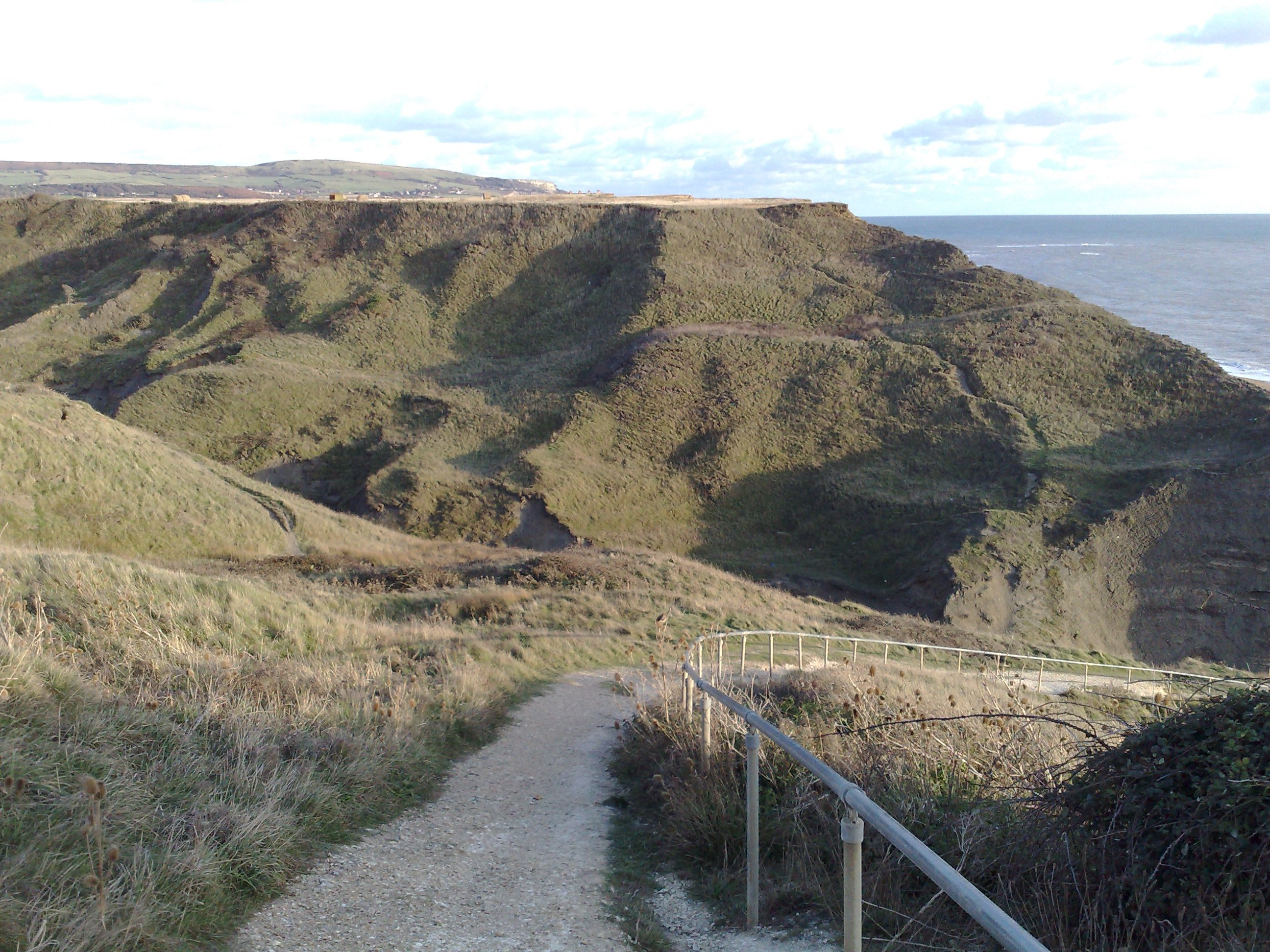
Shows how Shepherd's Chine has cut through the flat coastal edge

Shepherd's Chine is a geological feature on the south west coast of the Isle of Wight, England. It lies to the west of the village of Little Atherfield.

This chine is one of the largest on the Isle of Wight. It starts at the side of the A3055 Military Road and runs west for about 500m to reach the beach at Brighstone Bay just to the north of Atherfield Point.

This chine has much shallower sides than other chines on the Isle of Wight and is extensively covered with hardy bushes, scrub and rough grasses. Slumping is leaving many patches of bare ground.

The Chine drains water from the mainly flat agricultural land surrounding Little Atherfield. The resulting stream used to be collected behind a small dam and then pumped back onto the surrounding farm land. The remains of the reservoir and pump house, complete with pump, still stand about halfway along the chine. Similarly to Grange and Marsh Chine once the stream reaches the pebble beach it soaks in and disappears.

To the west of Shepherd's Chine is the Atherfield Bay Holiday Centre consisting of a campsite and chalets.

The Isle of Wight Coastal Path crosses Shepherd's Chine near the pump house.

The chine was probably formerly called Eadgylses muþan, meaning "Eadgil's river mouth" in ~826.
