= Colwell Bay =

Bay in the west of the Isle of Wight

- Site of Special Scientific Interest
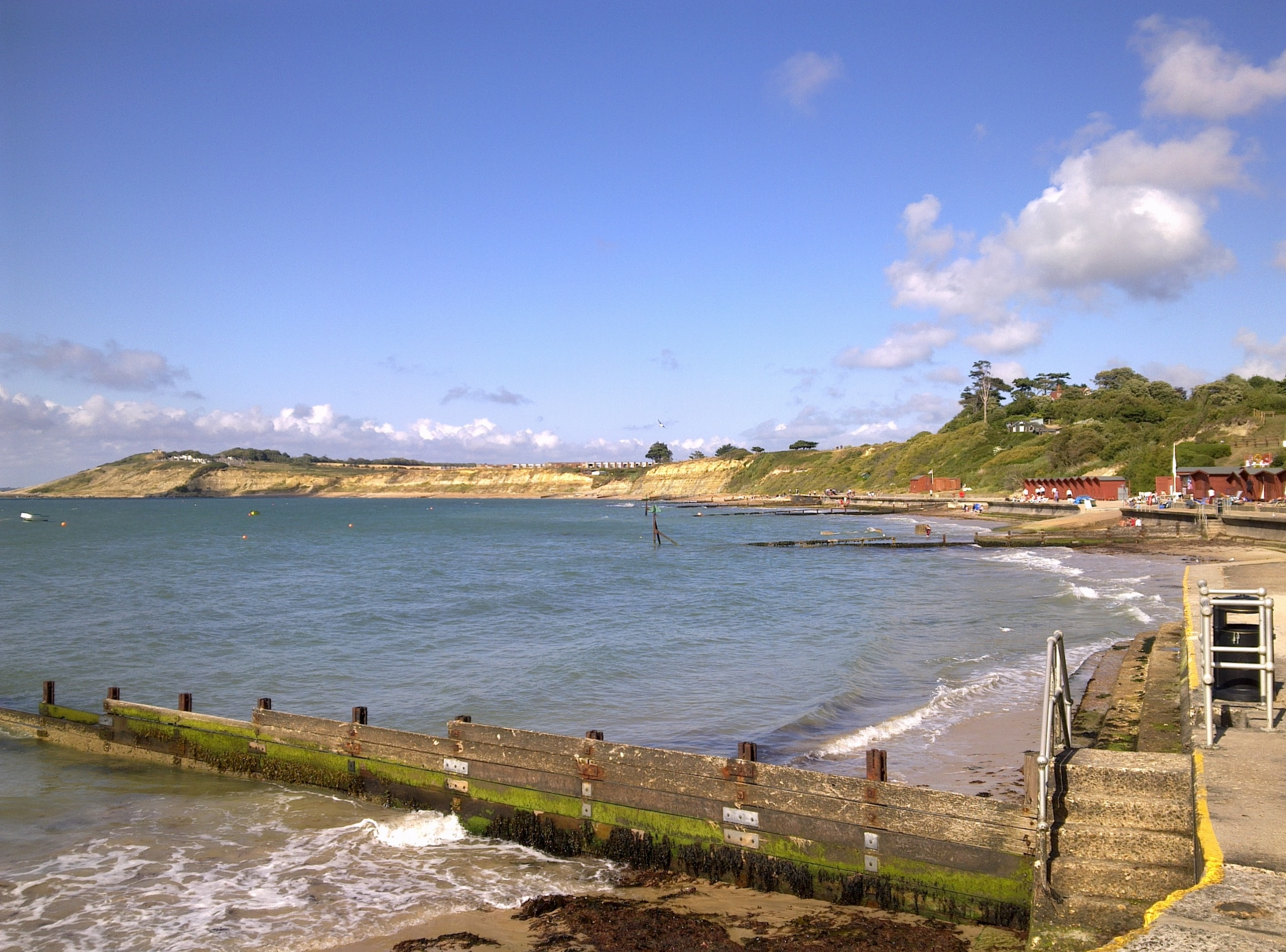

- Location within Isle of Wight
- Location of Colwell Bay.
- Area of search: Isle of Wight
- Grid reference: SZ323873
- Coordinates: 50°41′04″N 1°32′39″W
- Interest: Geological
- Area: 33.5 acres (13.56 ha)
- Notification date: 1959

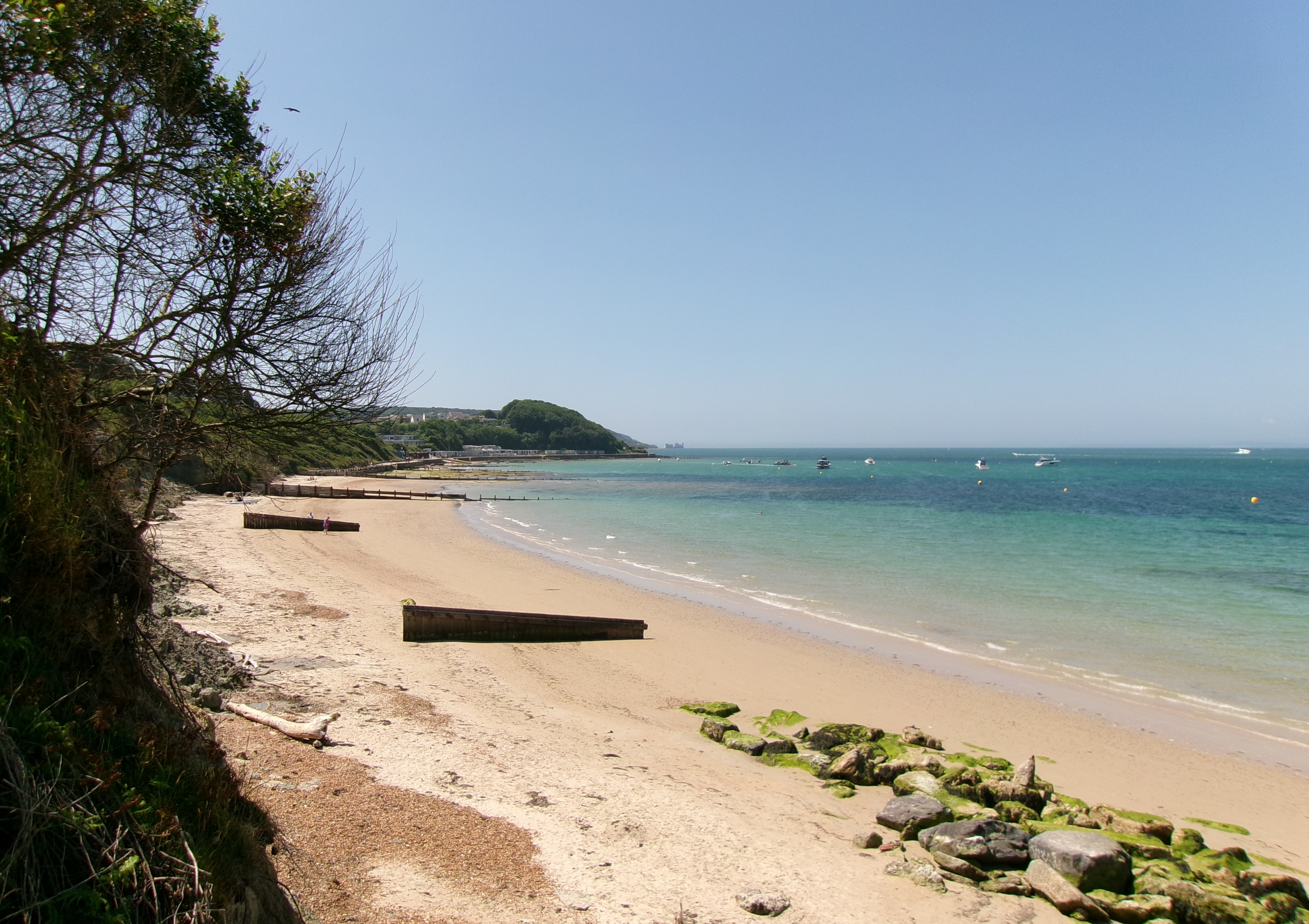
View of the bay from the north, with The Needles visible in far distance

Colwell Bay (grid reference SZ323873) is a bay in the west of the Isle of Wight. It is located between the towns of Totland and Yarmouth. The bay's northernmost point is Cliff's End (Fort Albert) the closest point of the Island to the British mainland, with Hurst Castle situated at the end of a long peninsula just under a mile (1500 metres) to the northwest. The bay's southern boundary is marked by Warden Point.

Colwell Bay has a popular beach, with two miles of sand and shingle, and facilities including cafes, shops and equipment hire outlets.

An area of 33.5 acres (13.56 ha) has been notified as a geological Site of Special Scientific Interest, notification originally taking place in 1959. The site is significant for its Eocene geology and maritime vegetated soft cliff habitat.

It is the location of three chines: Colwell Chine, Brambles Chine and Linstone Chine.

Colwell Bay is on the A3054 road and near the western end of the A3055 road. Public transport to the area is provided by Southern Vectis route 7 and the Needles Tour.

== Name ==
The name means 'the cool spring' or 'the spring with cool water', from Old English cōl and wella, referring to a spring that may feed one of the chines on the cliff edge.

1417: Colewhelle

1608: Collwell

1720 and 1769: Colwell
