= Shippards Chine =

Shippards Chine on the Isle of Wight

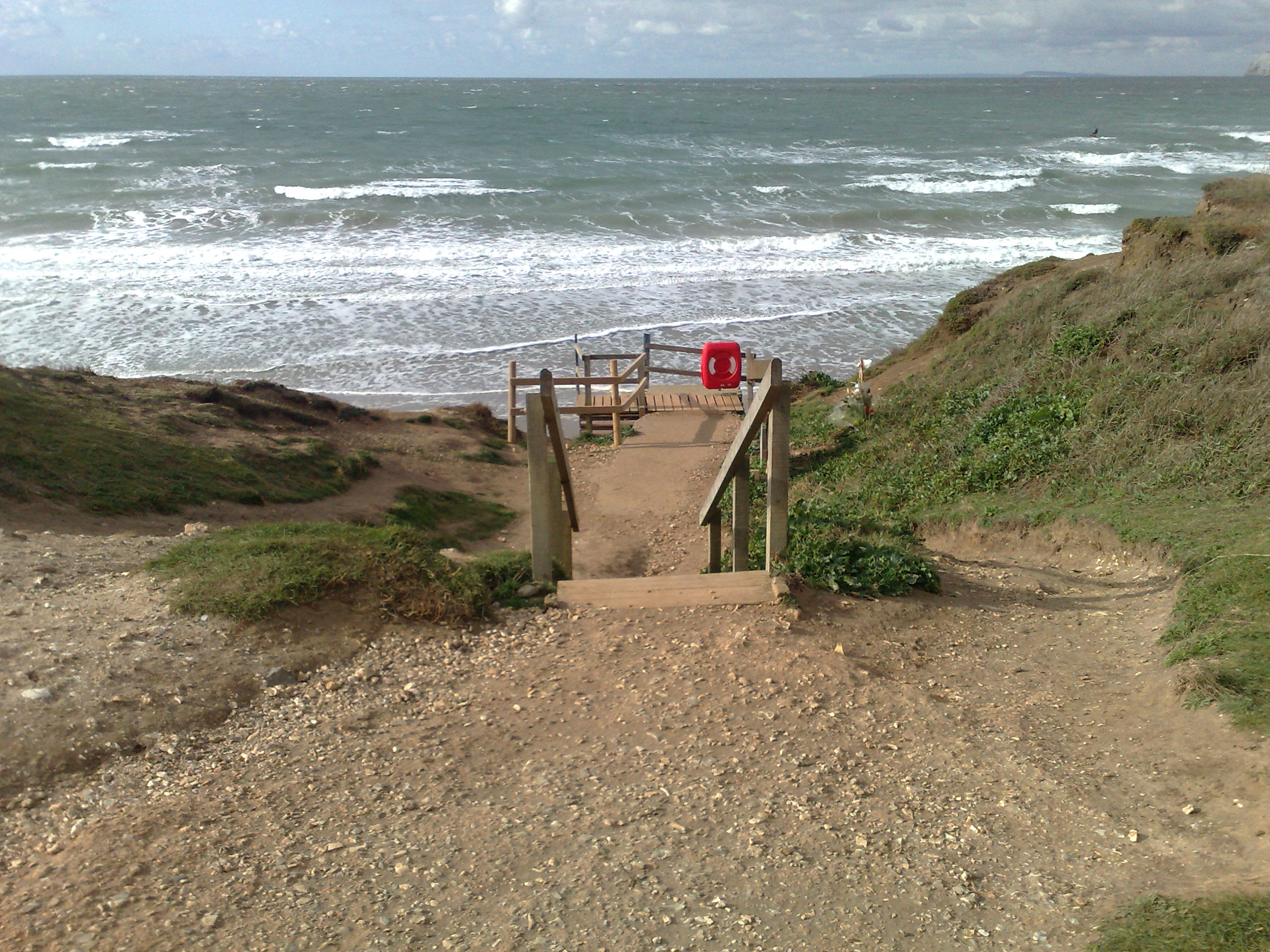
The remains of Shippards Chine

Shippards Chine is a geological feature on the south west coast of the Isle of Wight, England. It is west of the village of Brook and just north of Hanover Point.

It was a small sandy coastal gully; however, it has been redirected through a culvert down to beach level to reduce its effect on erosion to the cliff. A set of steps have been attached to the culvert to provide access to the beach of Compton Bay.

The chine/culvert carries water from a lake about 200m to the east, just across the nearby Military Road and also from small brooks that run down the hillside to the north.

The Isle of Wight Coastal Path crosses the top of the chine via a small footbridge. The surrounding land is owned and managed by the National Trust and is accessible from a nearby car park.
