= Christ Church, Totland =

Coordinates: 50°40′34″N 01°32′42″W

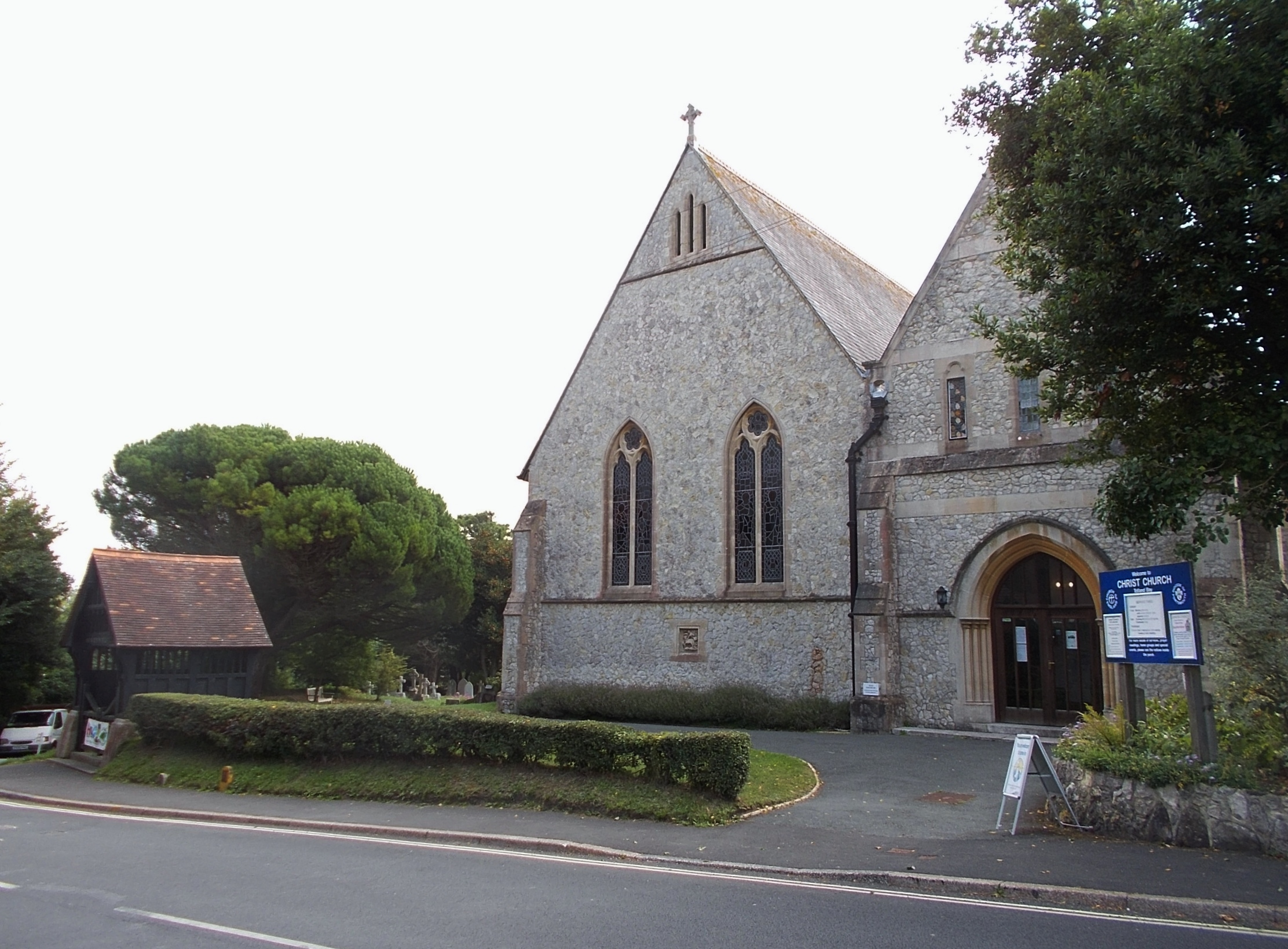
- Christ Church, Totland
- Denomination: Church of England
- Churchmanship: Broad Church

History
- Dedication: Christ Church

Administration
- Province: Canterbury
- Diocese: Portsmouth
- Parish: Totland

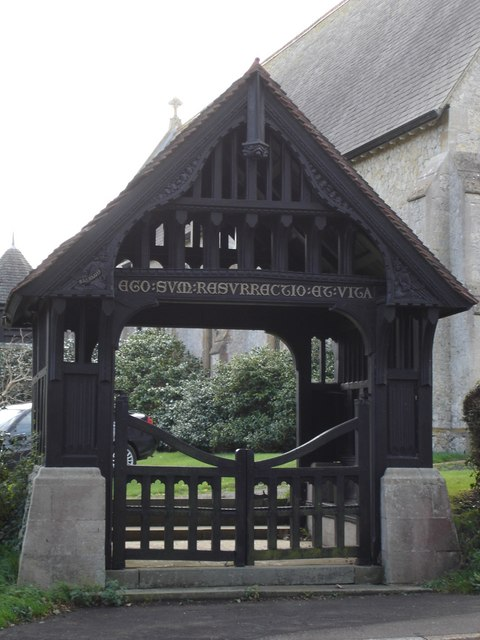
Lychgate of Christ Church, Totland

Christ Church, Totland is a parish church in the Church of England located in Totland, Isle of Wight.

== History ==
The church dates from 1875 and was designed by the architects Habershon and Pite.

In 1869 a temporary church of wood was erected opposite the present church. This was re-erected on Totland beach where it served as a village reading room and library and subsequently as an annex to the Totland Bay hotel. The current church was finished and consecrated in 1875. The extension was built in 1905.

The lych-gate was built in 1906. It is not in alignment with the church (as is normal with such structures) as it was built with the assumption there would be a further extension to the church (which was never built) to bring it into alignment. The wood used reputedly came from H.M.S. Thunderer, which fought at the Battle of Trafalgar.

== Organ ==
The pipe organ dates from 1911 by the builder Norman and Beard. A specification of the organ can be found on the National Pipe Organ Register.
