= Whale Chine =

- Chine
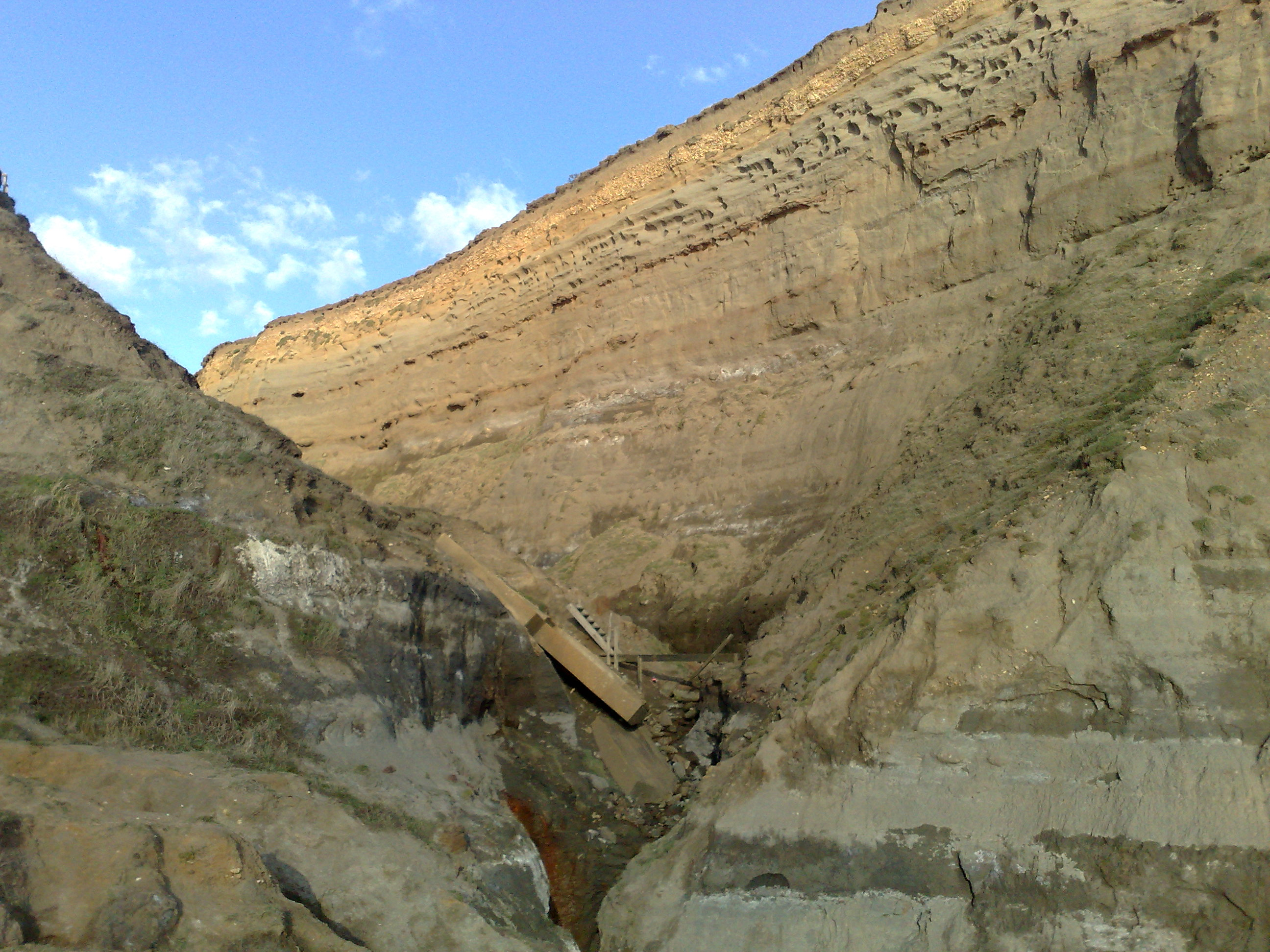
- Whale Chine from the beach. The remains of the steps can be seen.

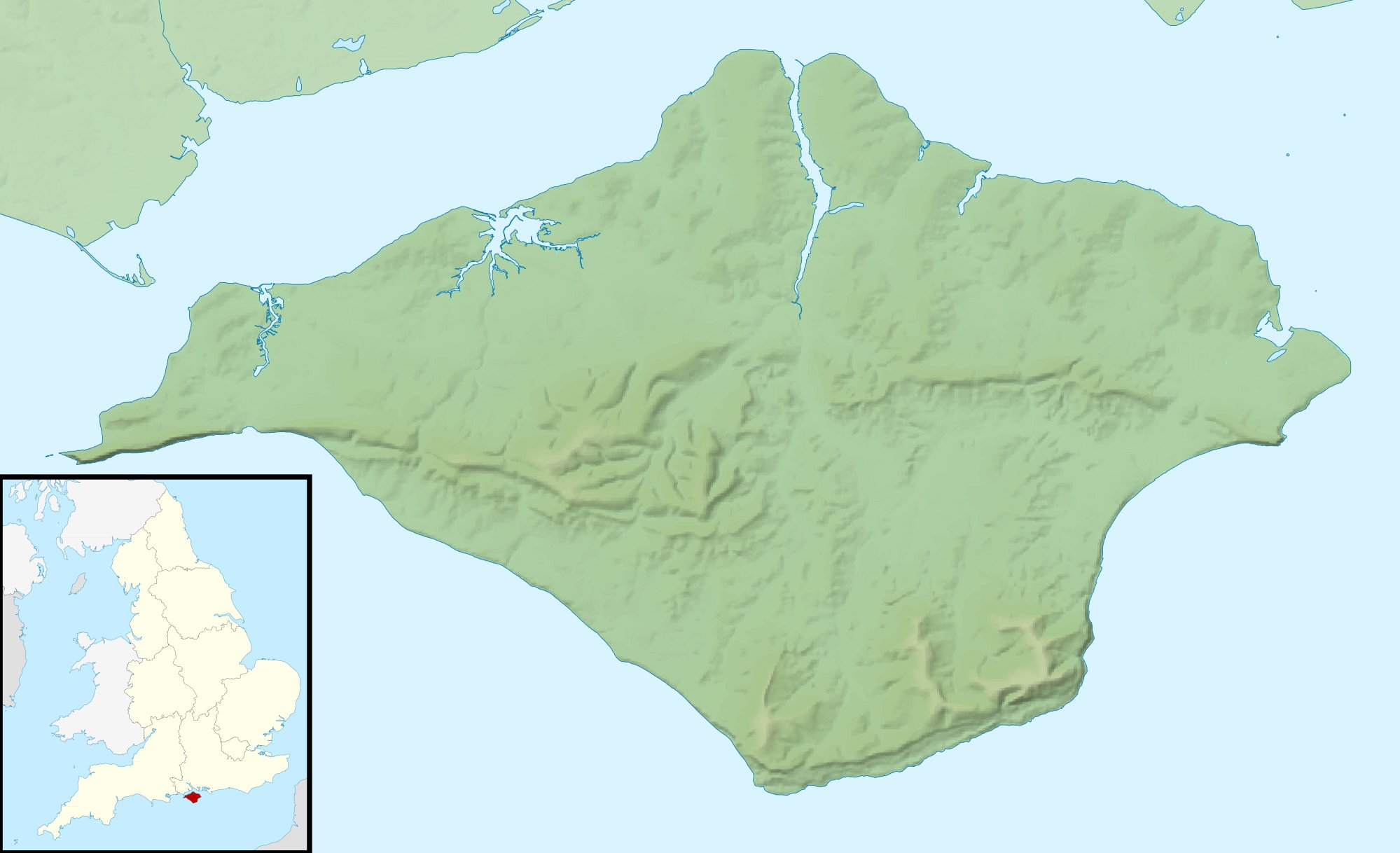
- Location within Isle of Wight
- Coordinates: 50°36′11″N 1°20′19″W
- Location: Chale, Isle of Wight
- Age: Jurassic, Cretaceous
- Elevation: 42 m

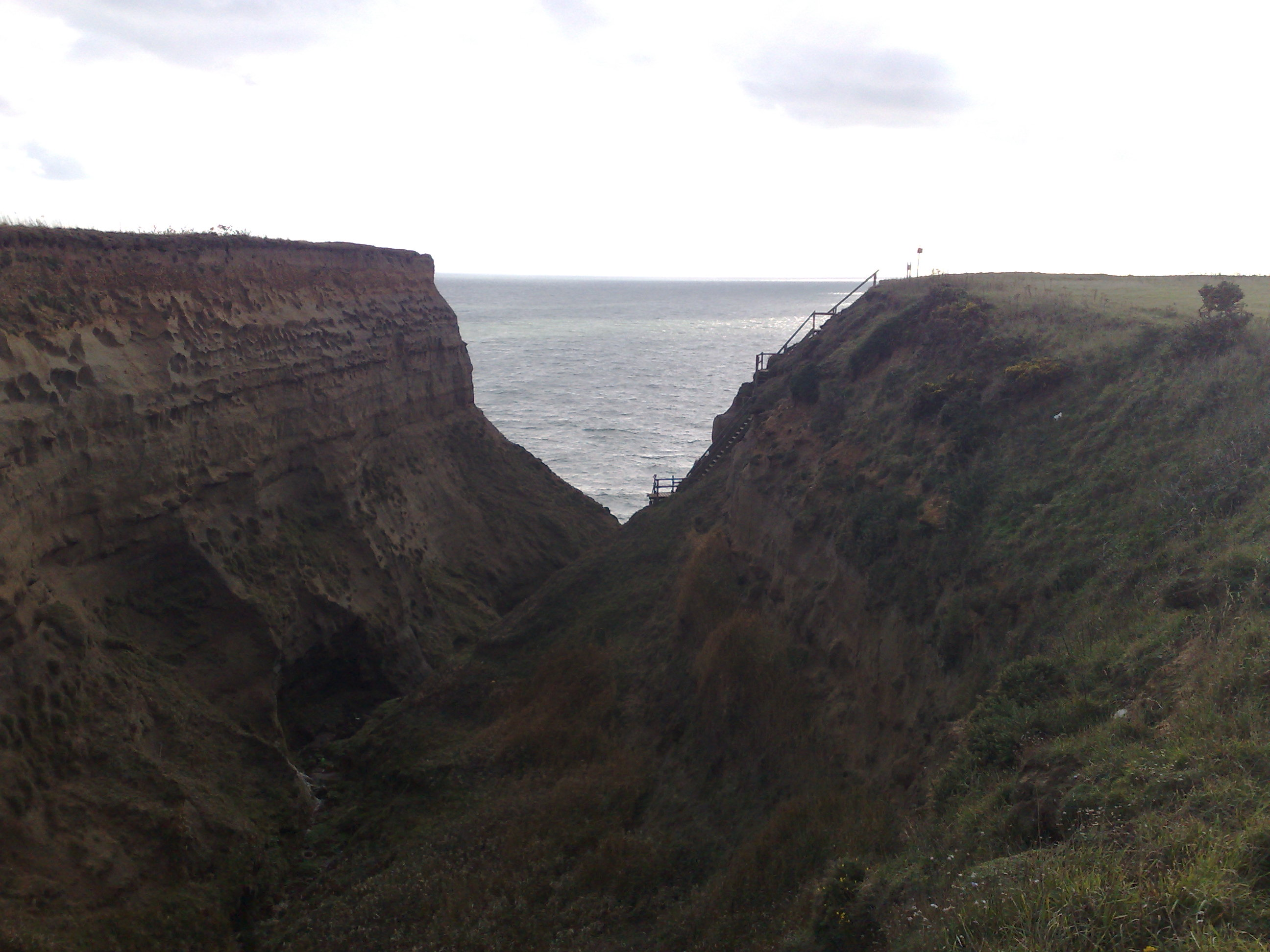
The steep sided Whale Chine

Whale Chine is a geological feature near Chale on the south-west coast of the Isle of Wight, England (the Back of the Wight). One of a number of such chines on the island created by stream erosion of soft Cretaceous rocks, it is a narrow and steep coastal ravine dropping 140 feet through Lower Greensand rocks from clifftop farmland to Chale Bay.

== History ==
Whale Chine is presumed to have been named after a bowhead whale that washed up in it, measured at 75 ft, with its name also presumed to have originated from the Wavell family, owners of the nearby Atherfield Farm between 1557 and 1636. The chine was the location of the wreck of the cargo ship Cormorant on 21 December 1886.

During World War II, concrete fortifications were built in the chine.

It is reached from a car park on the A3055 coastal road, where a stream running parallel to the cliff in a man-made ditch takes a right-angled bend to descend to the beach.

== Geology ==
Geologically the cliffs here belong to the Wealden supergroup and were deposited in a large scale meandering river and floodplain facies about 150 million years ago. The cliffs are famous for their fossil content which are commonly found in flash flood sandy deposits. These deposits can usually be recognized by the abundance of pyrite rich fossilized wood, and usually form as trough shapes. These troughs are characteristic of infilled stream channels caused by the deposition of the high energy carried material and organisms. Due to this the deposits are poorly sorted and the fossils amongst them are usually broken up. In the past, the descent to the beach at Whale Chine could be achieved by some 126 wooden steps, since their closure in 2005, these steps were washed away by the sea in the winter storms of 2013 and 2014. As the beach is a popular fishing site, Local fisherman have constructed a new flight of stairs by carving steps down through the rock, although this is not recommended. Despite the old steps forming part of a footpath and legal Right of Way (footpath C34, Chale Parish), the Isle of Wight Council refused to repair them, stating that "major structural works at great expense would be required to make the path safe for use with no guarantee that such works would be a permanent solution." They have been inaccessible to the public since at least 2005 and subject to a "temporary closure" since then.

Whale Chine is a popular fishing spot for many anglers. It boosts very clear sandy ground with intermittent rock features. The species caught here vary, but it is locally known as one of the best spots on the island for ray fishing: This is best from March–October. All summer species can be caught here, and it's not uncommon for shoals of mackerel and bass to drive whitebait onto the shore. Throughout the winter the fishing declines abit, with pout being the most common fish caught.

== Paleontology ==
A new species of fossil was found at Whale Chine during 2026. It was named after the collector who found it.
