= Compton Down =

Hill on the Isle of Wight, England

Coordinates: 50.67°N 1.48°W

- Site of Special Scientific Interest
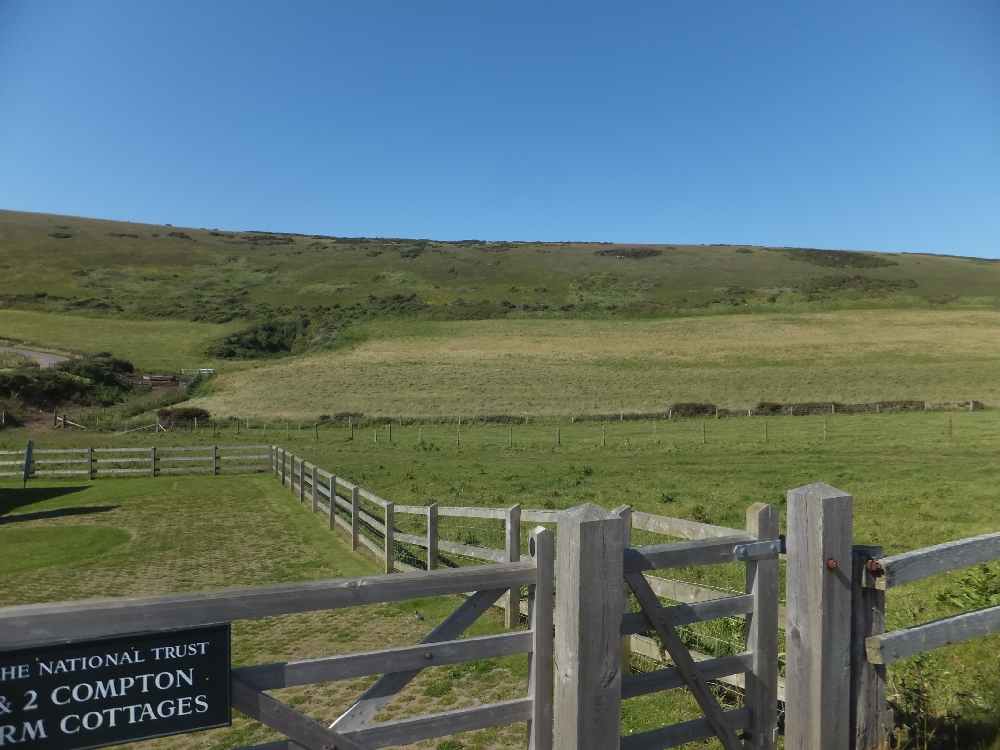
- Location of Compton Down.
- Area of search: Isle of Wight
- Grid reference: SZ365856
- Interest: Biological and Geological
- Area: 196.3 ha (485 acres)
- Notification date: 1951
- Location map: Natural England

Compton Down is a hill on the Isle of Wight just to the east of Freshwater Bay. It is part of the chalk ridge which forms the "backbone" of the Isle of Wight. It runs east to west, is approximately three miles (4.8 km) long and is predominantly grass downland. The Down is owned and managed by the National Trust and it provides the setting for the Freshwater Bay Golf Course at its western end.

It is a 196.3-hectare (485-acre) Site of special scientific interest. The site was notified in 1951 for both its biological and geological features.
