= Shanklin Chine =

Chine and tourist attraction in Shanklin, Isle of Wight

Coordinates: 50°37′34″N 1°10′28″W

Shanklin Chine's largest waterfall, near the upper pay gate.

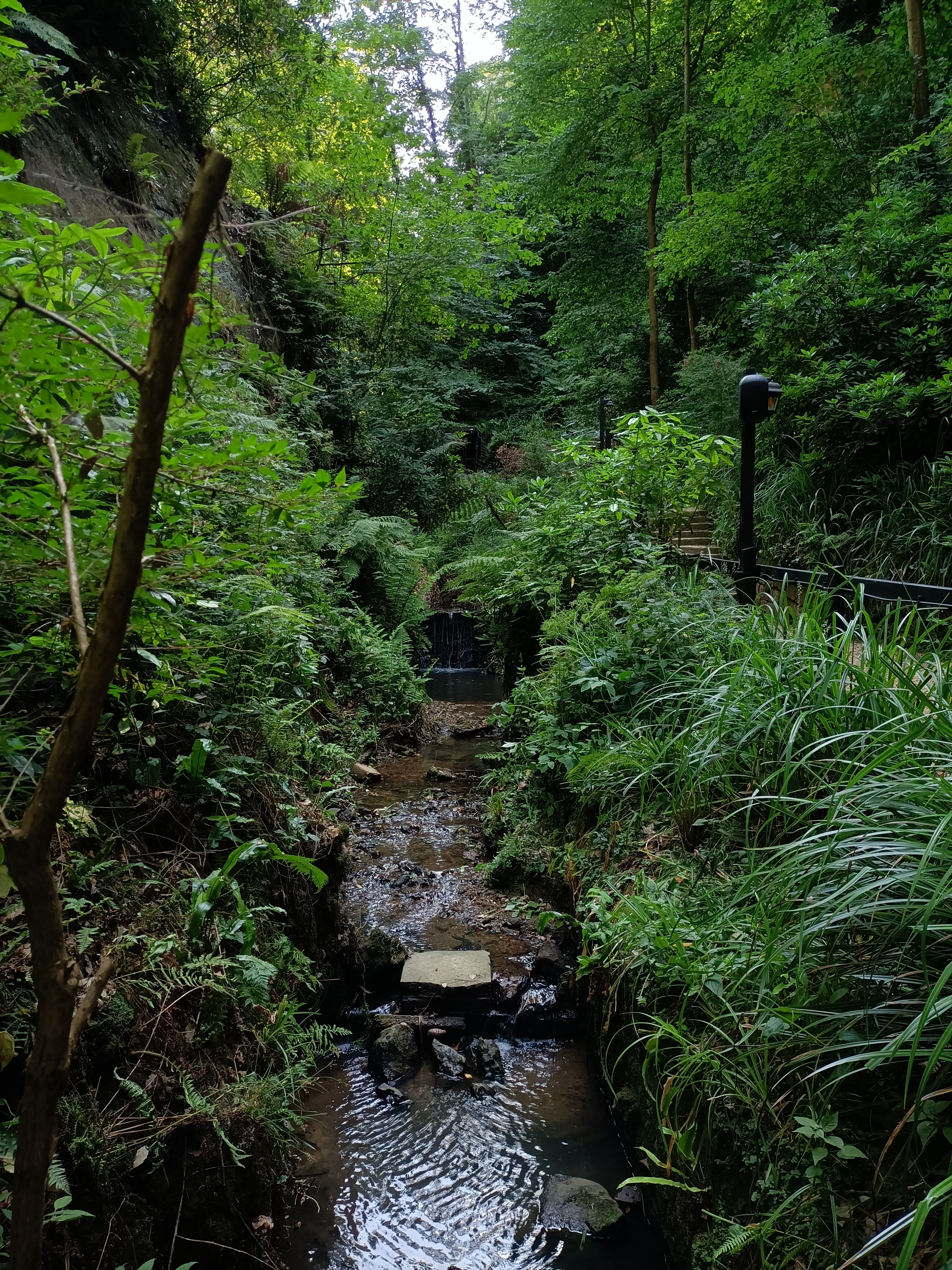
Creek's rapid at the bottom of the Chine.

Shanklin Chine on the Isle of Wight

Shanklin Chine is a geological feature and tourist attraction in the town of Shanklin, on the Isle of Wight, England. A wooded coastal ravine, it contains waterfalls, trees and lush vegetation, with footpaths and walkways allowing paid access for visitors, and a heritage centre explaining its history.

== Geology ==
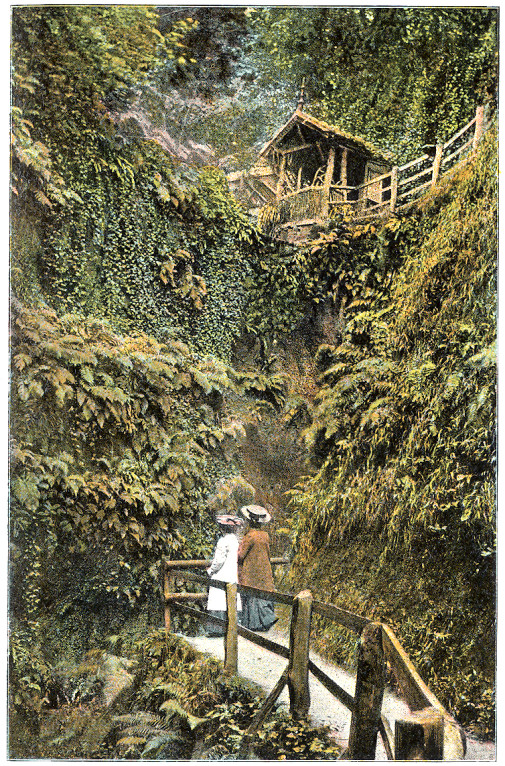
Shanklin Chine, circa 1910.

A chine is a local word for a stream cutting back into a soft cliff. Formation of the chine, which cuts through Lower Greensand Cretaceous sandstones, has taken place over the last 10,000 years. In the latter half of the nineteenth century, stones were laid at the top of the waterfall to arrest this progress. There are a continuous series of spring lines on the cliff faces in the chine. The Isle of Wight has a number of chines, but the largest remaining is Shanklin. With a drop of 32 metres (105 ft) to sea level, and a length of just over 400 metres (1,300 ft), the chine covers an area of approximately 1.2 hectares (3.0 acres).

== History ==
Shanklin's name originates from the biggest waterfall in the chine, from Old English scenc and hlinc, meaning 'the bank by the drinking-cup, drinking-cup ledge'.

Prior to the Victorian era, Shanklin was a small agricultural and fishing community, the latter nestling at the foot of the chine, and it was not until the early 19th century that it began to grow. Like most of the chines on the south of the island, Shanklin Chine was well-used by smugglers.

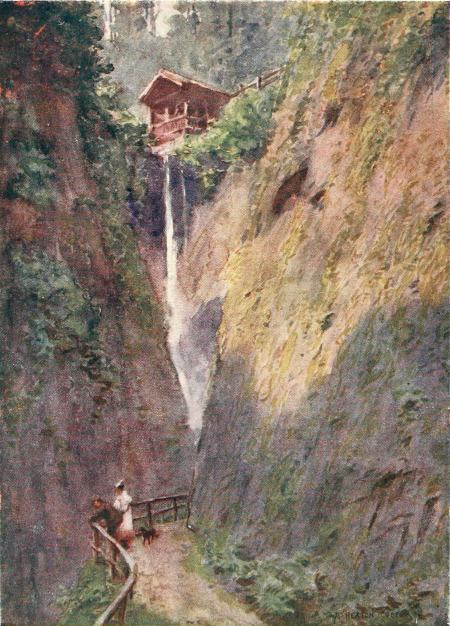
Shanklin Chine depicted in the Beautiful Britain series by G. E. Mitton

The chine became one of the earliest tourist attractions on the Isle of Wight, with records of the public visiting the site to view it as far back as 1817. Keats found inspiration for some of his greatest poetry while staying at Shanklin in 1819 and wrote: "The wondrous Chine here is a very great Lion; I wish I had as many guineas as there have been spy-glasses in it." It was a favourite subject for artists including Thomas Rowlandson and Samuel Howitt. In Beauties of the Isle of Wight (1828, S. Horsley describes the chine as a "phenomenon of nature [that] is a combination of beauty and grandeur [...] the rippling stream urges its way to the ocean, which pours its rolling waters at its feet, and spreads its boundless expanse before it."

=== Second World War ===
During the Second World War the chine was taken over and used as an assault course by the Commandos whose HQ was at Upper Chine School. 40 Royal Marine Commando trained there in preparation for the Dieppe Raid in 1942. A fuel pipeline for Operation Pluto (Pipeline under the Ocean) also ran through the chine, and 65 yards (59 m) of pipework has been preserved at the chine.

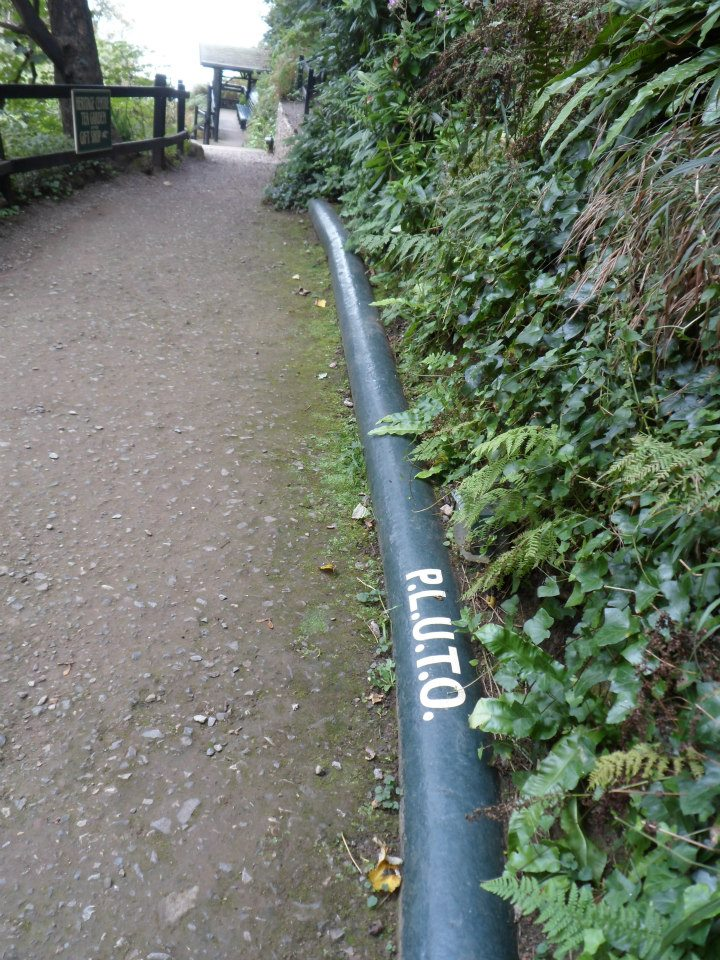
A surviving section of the PLUTO pipeline at Shanklin Chine.

PLUTO, one of the great secret successes of the war, was the idea of Lord Louis Mountbatten who later became governor of the Isle of Wight. During the Normandy landings in 1944, forked pipelines from the chine and Sandown carried petrol 65 miles (105 km) under the Channel to Cherbourg.
