= Little Atherfield =

Village on the Isle of Wight, United Kingdom

Coordinates: 50.619°N 1.352°W

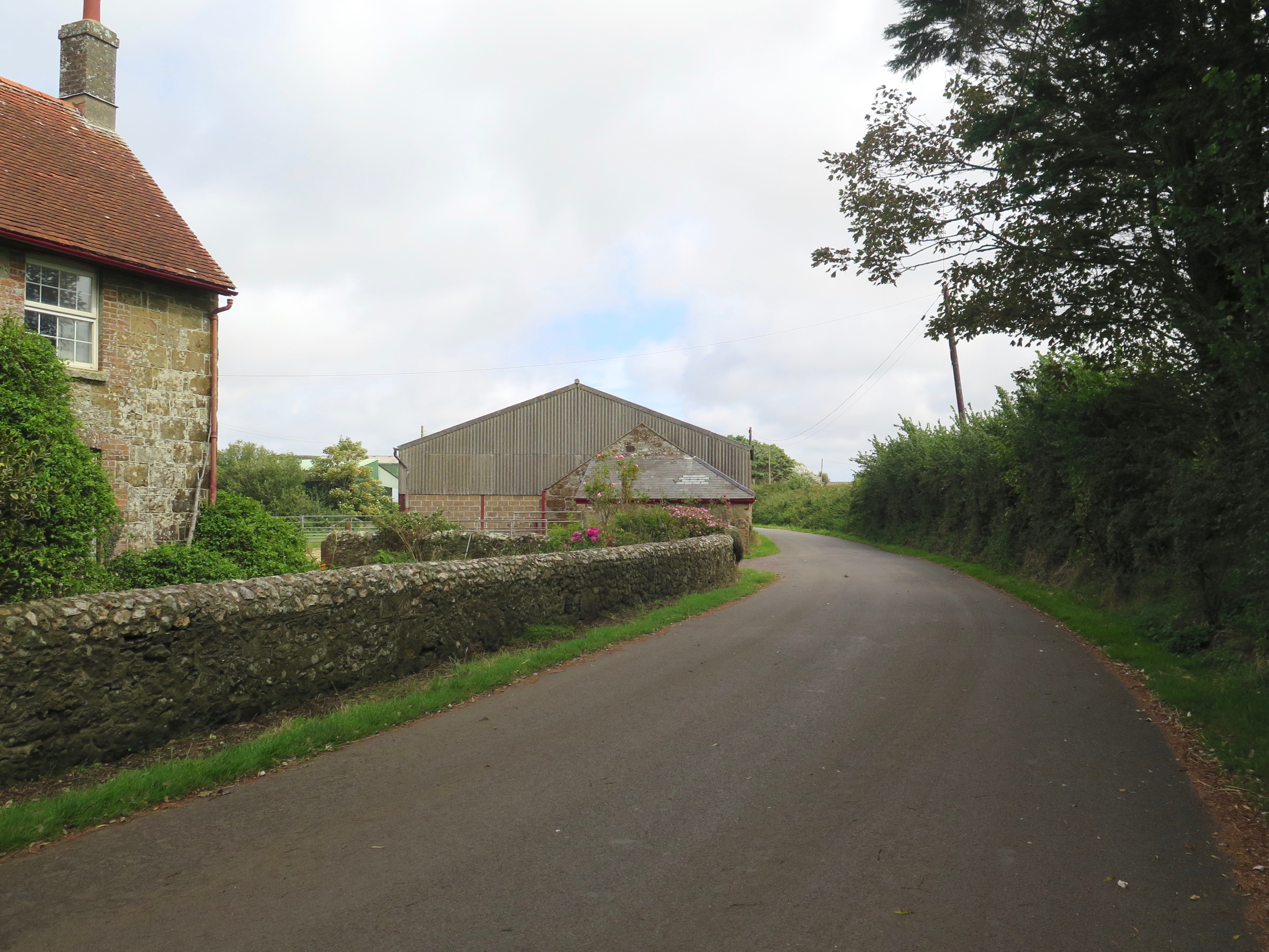
Little Atherfield

Little Atherfield is a small hamlet in the civil parish of Shorwell, on the Isle of Wight, England. It is near the coast in the Back of the Wight. The Isle of Wight is situated off the south coast of England.

== History ==
In 1086, it had a population of 1 household, with1 smallholder. It had 1 ploughland and a 1.5 acres (65,000 sq ft) meadow. Its value was 10 shillings in 1086.

Tenant-in-chief 1086: William son of Stur

Lord 1086: Travers

Lord 1066: Wulfgeat

== Name ==
The name means 'the open land belonging to the family or followers of a man called Ēadhere or Æthelhere', from Old English Ēadhere or Æthelhere (personal name), -inga- and feld. The 1086 spelling shows the Norman influence on the name.

959 (in a copy from ~1300): Aderingefelda

1086 (Domesday Book): Avrefel, Egrafel

1205: Atherefeld

1248: Adherfeld

1287: Atherfeld
