= Totland =

Village on the Isle of Wight in England

Coordinates: 50.68492°N 1.53658°W

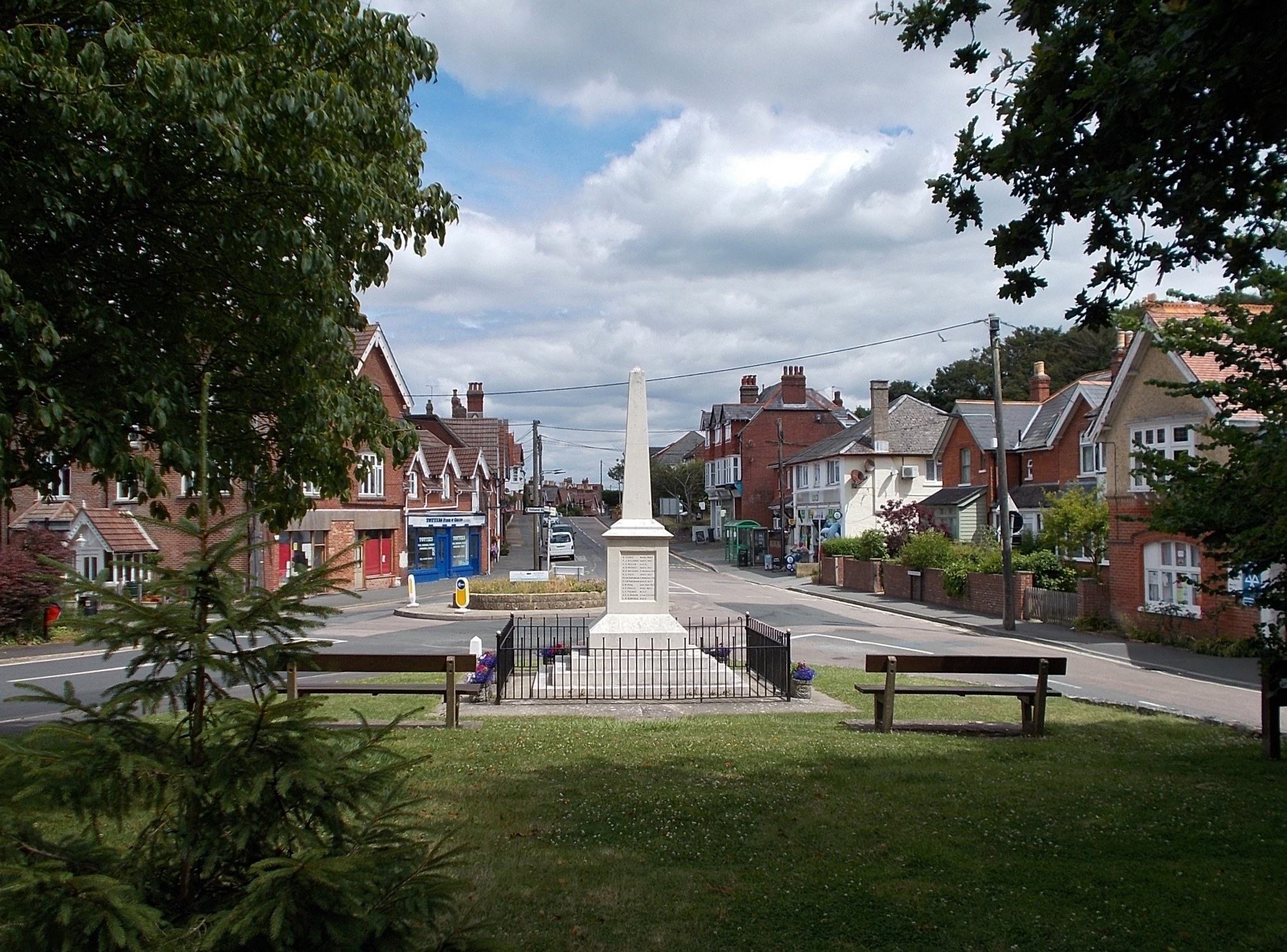

- Location within the Isle of Wight
- Population: 2,927 (2011)
- OS grid reference: SZ328873
- Civil parish: Totland
- Unitary authority: Isle of Wight
- Ceremonial county: Isle of Wight
- Region: South East
- Country: England
- Sovereign state: United Kingdom
- Post town: Totland Bay
- Postcode district: PO39
- Dialling code: 01983
- Police: Hampshire and Isle of Wight
- Fire: Hampshire and Isle of Wight
- Ambulance: Isle of Wight
- UK Parliament: Isle of Wight West

Totland is a village, civil parish and electoral ward on the Isle of Wight. Besides the village of Totland, the civil parish comprises the western tip of the Isle of Wight, and includes The Needles, Tennyson Down and the hamlet of Middleton.

The village of Totland lies on the Western peninsula where the Western Yar almost cuts through along with Alum Bay and Freshwater. It lies on the coast at Colwell Bay, which is the closest part of the island to the British mainland.

== Name ==
The name means 'The cultivated land or estate with a look-out place', from Old English tōt and land. The look-out would have used a beacon for warnings of danger, and in 1324, a beacon on Headon Hill was mentioned. The name Warden Point also refers to keeping watch.

~1240: Toteland

1337: Tottelonde

1341: Toteland

1608: Totland

== Today ==
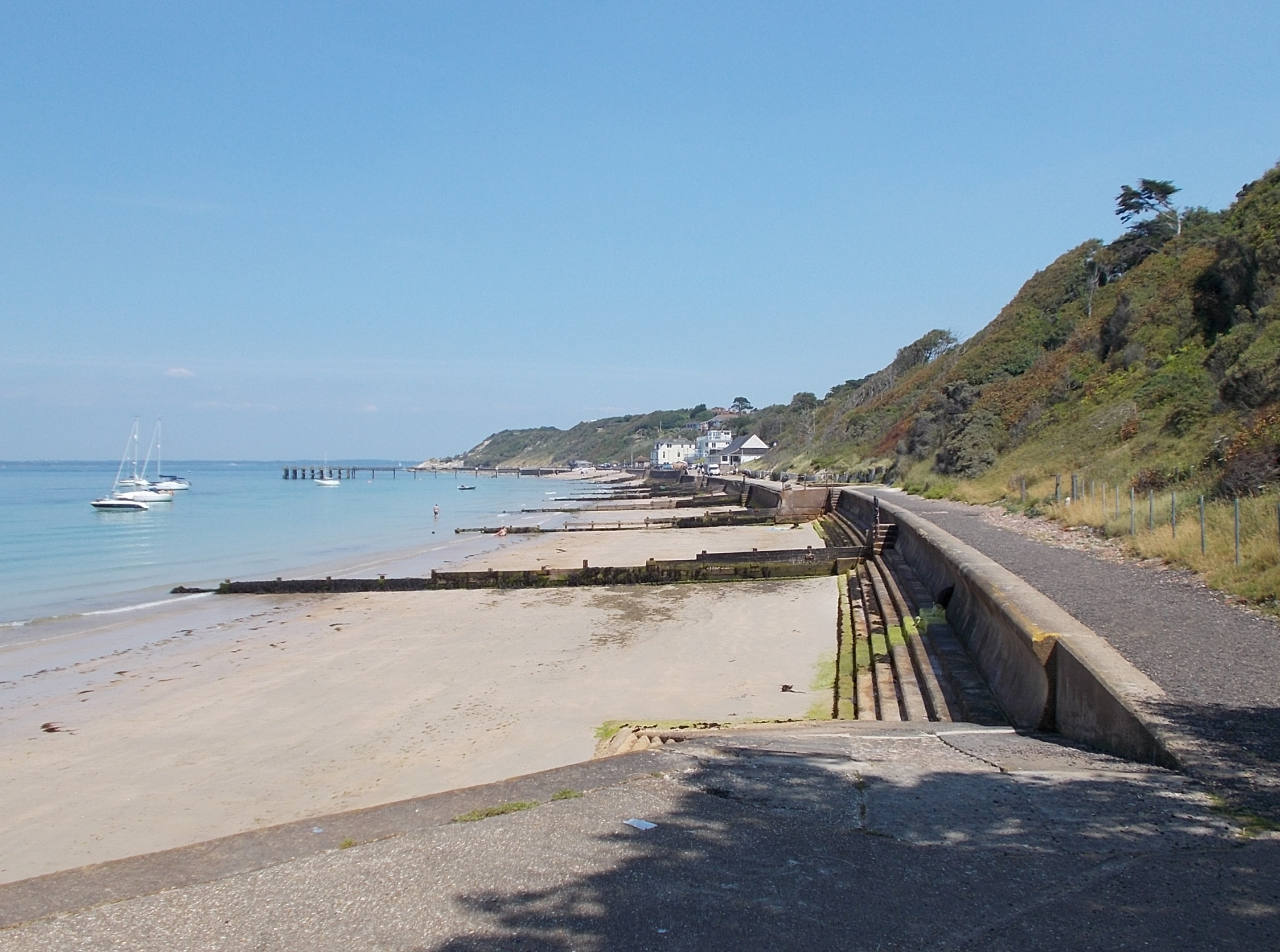
Totland beach

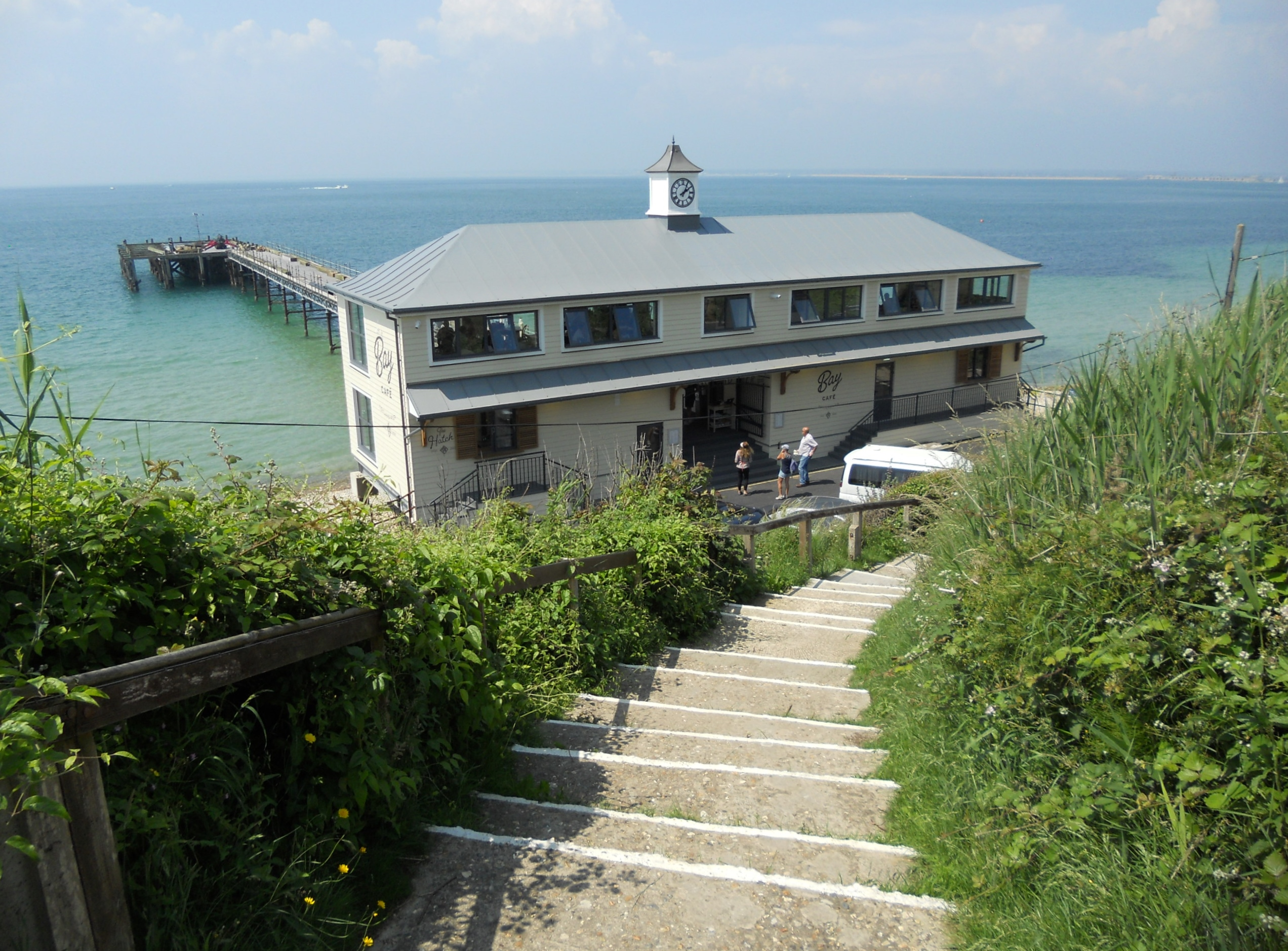
Totland Pier and Bay Café in 2021

It is linked to other parts of the island by Southern Vectis buses on route 7, and route 12 serving Freshwater, Yarmouth and Newport including intermediate villages. In the summer, open-top bus "The Needles Tour" also serves the village.

Christ Church, Totland is the Church of England parish.

== Environmental concerns ==
During Christmas 2012, a large landslip overran a section of the sea wall between Totland Bay and adjacent Colwell Bay, also blocking the walkway which ran along the top of the wall. The local council sealed off the affected section from the public. After a successful local campaign the council accepted a compromise solution and a new path over the landslip was opened to the public on 12 September 2015.

== See also ==
- Christ Church, Totland
- Totland Bay
- List of current places of worship on the Isle of Wight
