= Isle of Wight Coastal Path =

70-mile footpath on the Isle of Wight, England

Coordinates: 50.73269°N 1.15969°W

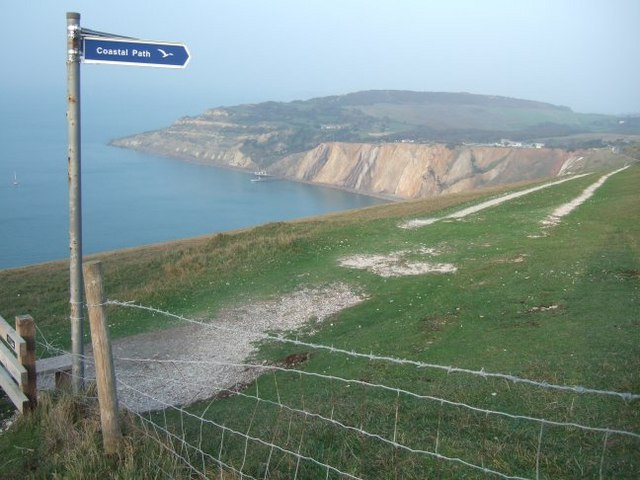
- Above Alum Bay
- Length: 67 mi (108 km)
- Location: Isle of Wight, England
- Trailheads: Circular walk, accessible by bus or train at many points
- Use: Dog Walking, Hiking, Running, Cycling
- Difficulty: Easy: A few significant hills, varied surfaces
- Season: All year

The Isle of Wight Coastal Path (or Coastal Footpath) is a circular long-distance footpath of 70 miles (110 km) around the Isle of Wight, England. It follows public footpaths and minor lanes, with some sections along roads.

== Route ==
The path is waymarked in both directions and can be started at any point, but is described here clockwise from the pier at Ryde (grid reference SZ594929).

=== Ryde to Sandown ===
==== Ryde to Bembridge (7.5 miles) ====
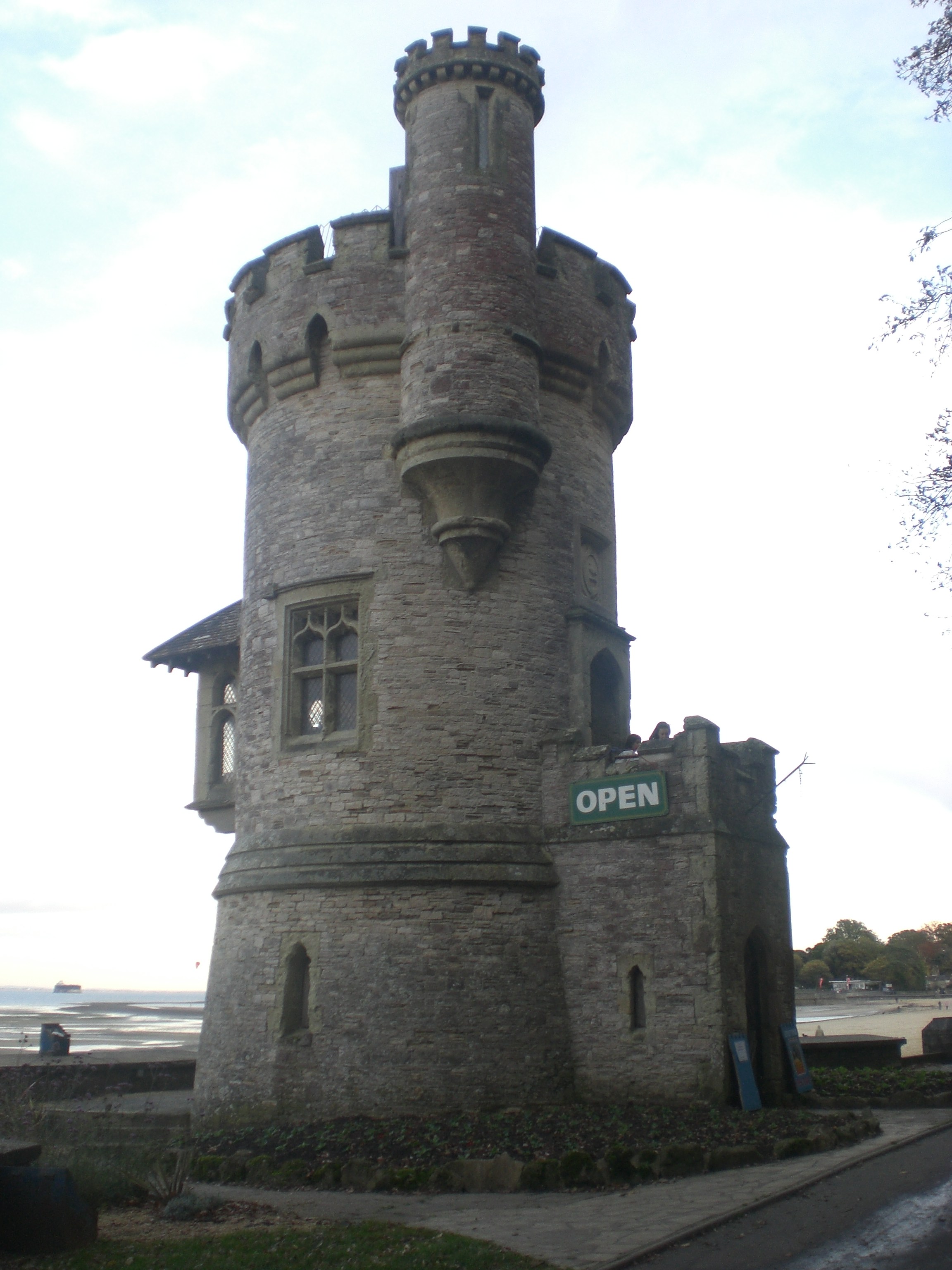
Appley Tower

From the bus station by Ryde Pier, the path follows the Esplanade close to the beach. It passes Appley Tower and Puckpool Point before rejoining the coast road to Seaview. It then climbs inland on footpaths, skirting Priory Woods, before returning to sea level at The Duver near St Helen's Old Church. Then the path crosses the edge of Bembridge Harbour on the old mill wall, using Embankment Road to pass the houseboats in the harbour. The path then continues into Bembridge and to the Lifeboat Station.

==== Bembridge to Sandown (5.5 miles) ====
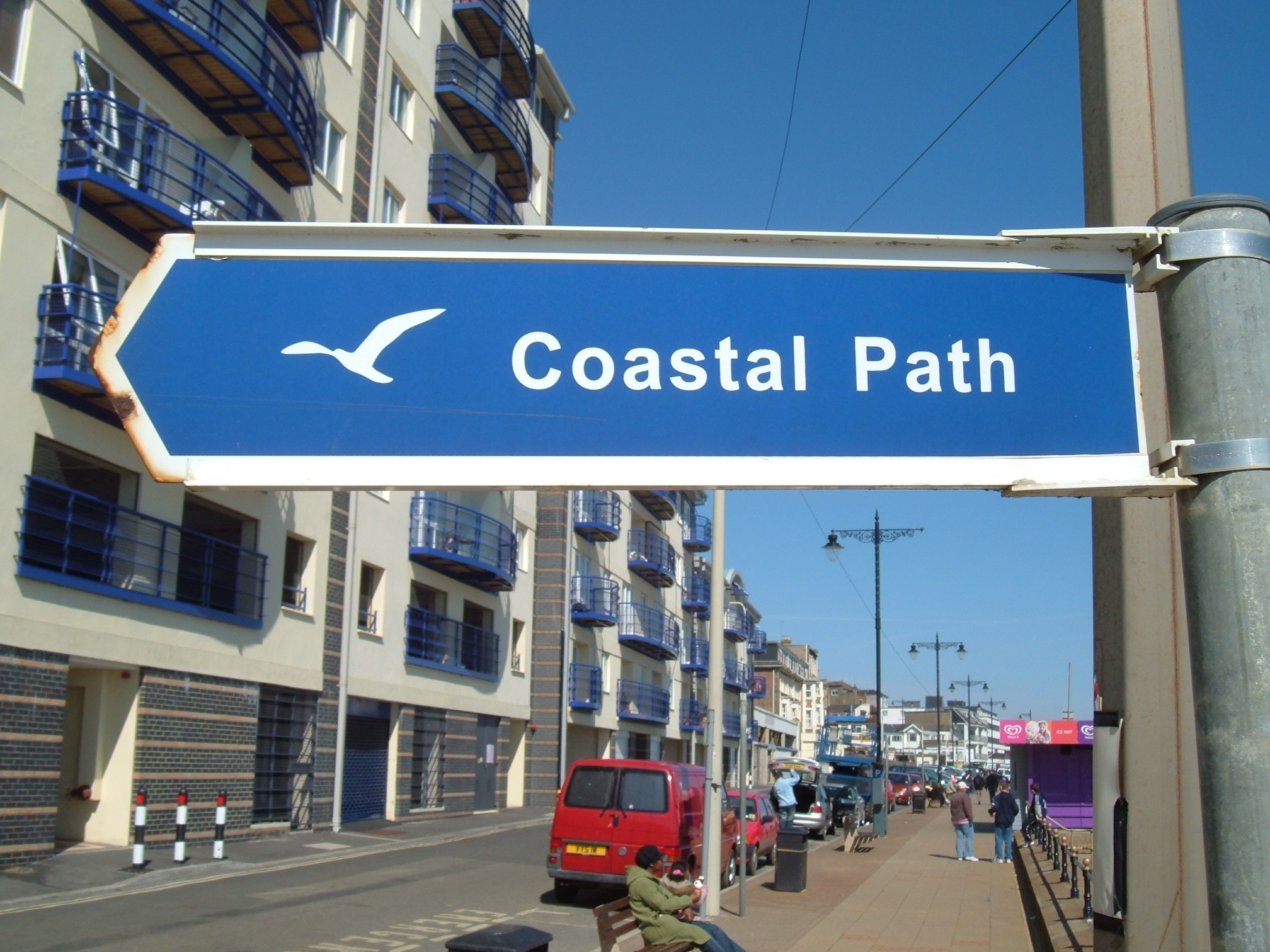
Coast Path sign at Sandown

The path follows the coast around the eastern tip of the Island at Foreland, then skirts the cliffs above Whitecliff Bay. This part is subject to regular erosion; as of 2012 a section at Foreland is closed (walkers may prefer to divert and walk through Bembridge village). From Whitecliff Bay and its caravan park the path climbs steadily to Culver Down and the Yarborough Monument, with impressive views across Sandown Bay and across the Solent to Portsmouth. Dropping fairly steeply away from Culver Down, the path meets the beach again at Yaverland, then passes the Isle of Wight Zoo and enters Sandown.

=== Sandown to Ventnor ===
==== Sandown to Shanklin ====
The two-mile coastal walk between Sandown and Shanklin is a popular attraction, with a choice of the moderately undulating coastal (cliff) path or the flat sea wall promenade. At Shanklin, there is a "cliff lift" (open Summer only), which may help make the decision. There are a couple of cafes on the cliff open during the summer months.

==== Shanklin to Ventnor ====
From Shanklin the path passes the Fisherman's Cottage pub on the beach at the foot of Shanklin Chine, before climbing Appley Steps up the side of the cliff and then through the edge of Shanklin. It continues uphill on a minor road, passing Luccombe village, where there are magnificent views across Sandown Bay. It then follows paths and steps through the woods of the Bonchurch Landslips (where a side path ascends to the Devil's Chimney) before reaching the sea again at Horseshore Bay. It then follows the sea wall for two miles until reaching Ventnor.

=== Ventnor to Freshwater Bay ===
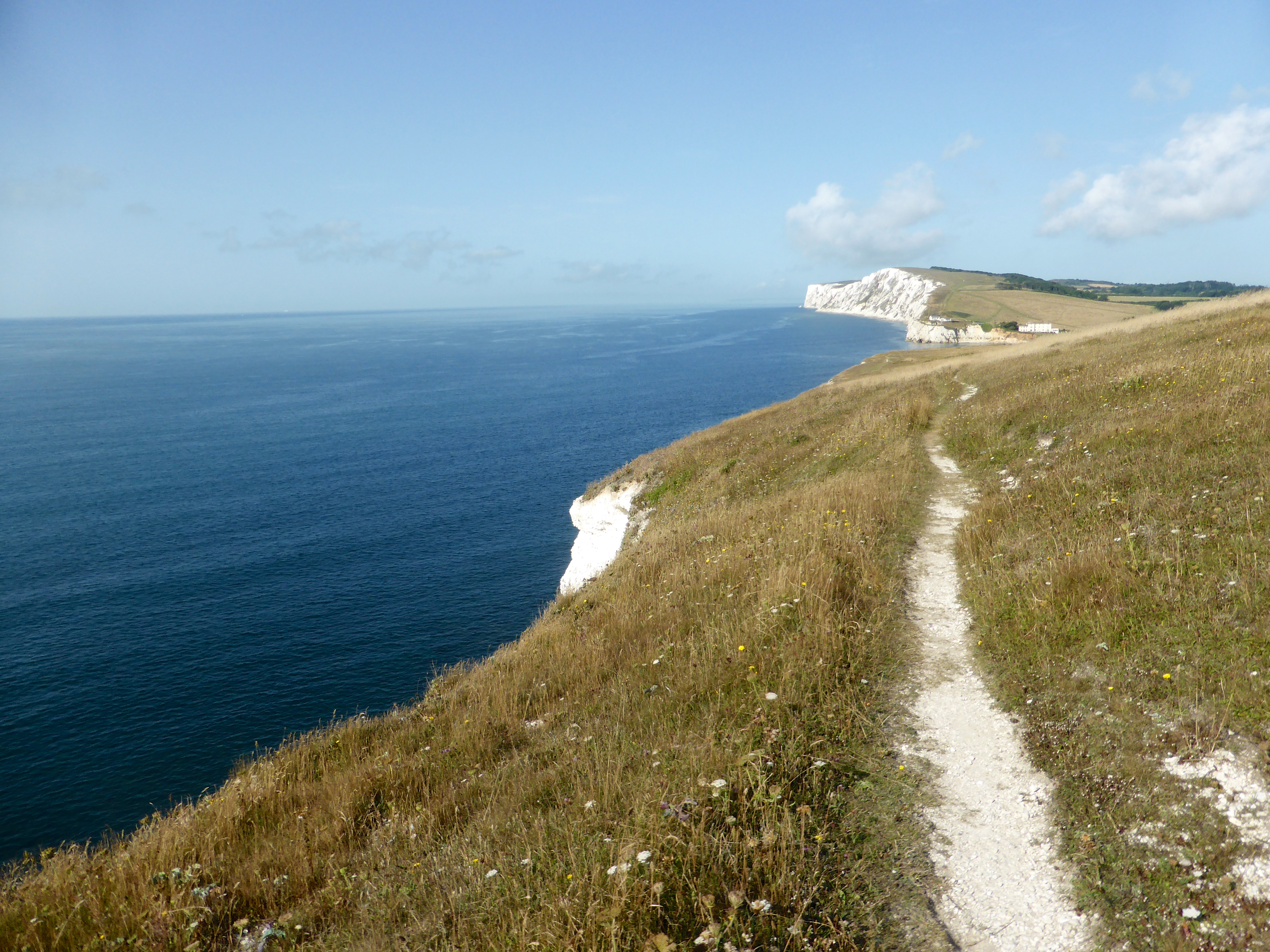
East of Freshwater

==== Blackgang to Brook ====
Description of Niton to Brighstone IOW coastal path

=== Freshwater Bay to Yarmouth ===
==== Freshwater Bay to Needles New Battery ====
Starting 100 metres west of The Albion Hotel, the path is a steady climb ascending Tennyson Down where at its peak stands the Tennyson memorial. The path continues forward to the Needles Old Battery (National Trust) with views over Alum Bay.

=== Yarmouth to East Cowes ===
Away from the approaches to East Cowes and Yarmouth, the majority of this section follows inland roads and many unmade, muddy public footpaths. Between Thorness Bay and Hamstead Point the path takes a circuitous 7 mile route via Newtown and Shalfleet to avoid a rifle range and the Newtown River.

The total official length of this section is 17 miles.

=== East Cowes to Ryde ===
==== Wootton to Ryde ====
Walking on roads until the outskirts of Fishbourne, then along a track past Quarr Abbey and Ryde Golf Course, then roads into Ryde.

== Practical aspects ==
The route is circular and one can join at any point.

The route is easily accessible by public transport: Ryde and Yarmouth Bus Stations are on the route, and Southern Vectis bus routes stop near the route. Ferry services from the mainland arrive at Yarmouth, Cowes, East Cowes, Fishbourne and Ryde, all of which are on the route. Additionally, Ryde Esplanade and Lake railway stations are on the path, and Shanklin and Sandown stations are less than 750m away.

There are some sections, notably between Blackgang and Brook, where public transport is limited. Small public car parks are located along the Military Road, most of which are free. In other locations, car parking on the route is within an urban or semi-urban area and a fee is charged.

The Ordnance Survey maps covering the route are:

- Landranger 1:50,000 sheet 196
- Explorer 1:25,000 sheet OL29 Isle of Wight

Both publications cover the entire route, although the Explorer has the greater detail.

The route is mostly waymarked with signs, showing a seagull symbol and the words "Coastal Footpath" Some signs include the next destination(s) on the route, with the distance in miles.

The route can be completed in as little as two long days but that is not advisable.
