= Newtown, Isle of Wight =

Settlement on the Isle of Wight, England

Coordinates: 50.70912°N 1.39243°W

Newtown
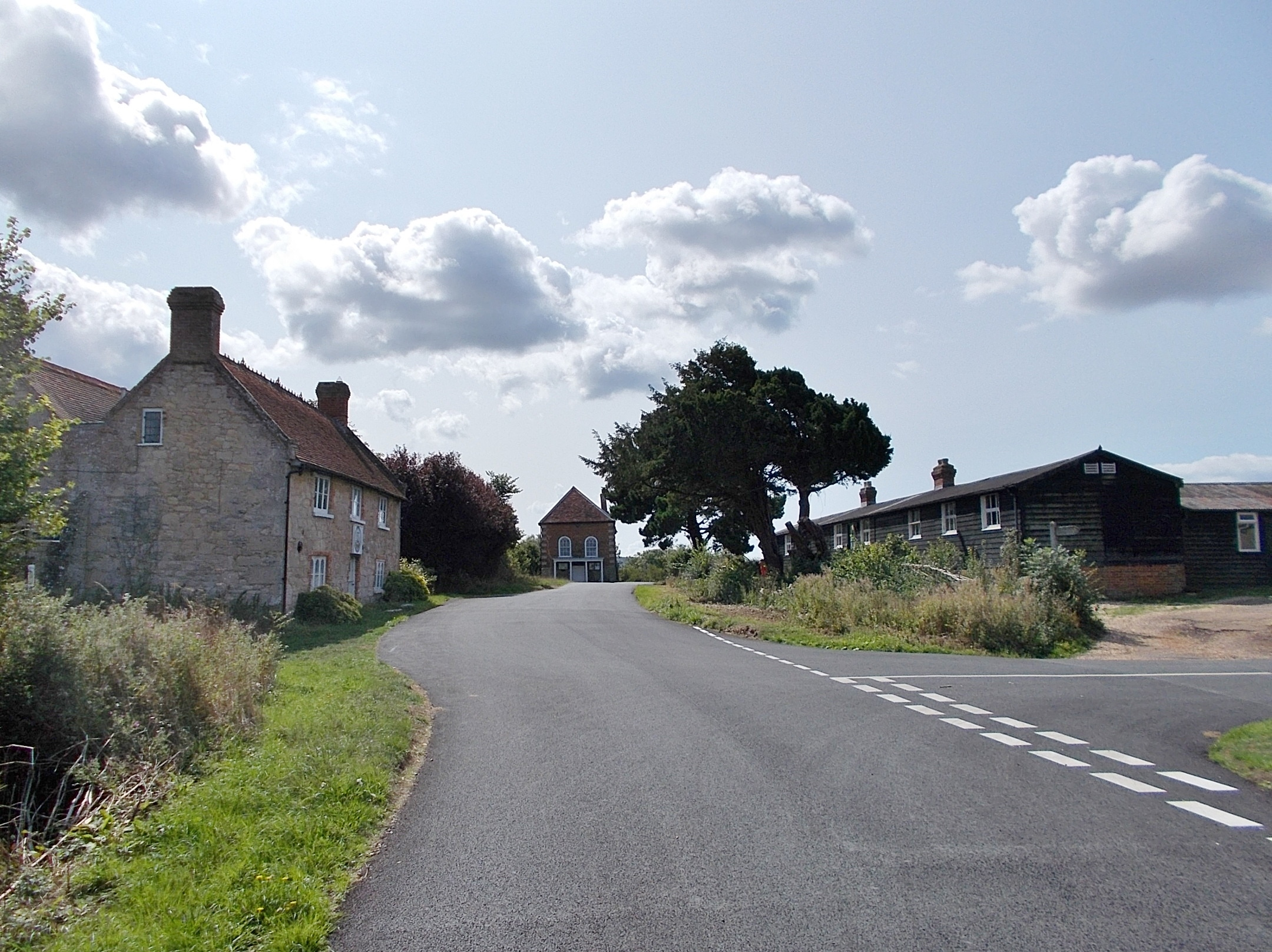

- Location within the Isle of Wight
- OS grid reference: SZ429901
- Civil parish: Calbourne, Newtown and Porchfield
- Unitary authority: Isle of Wight
- Ceremonial county: Isle of Wight
- Region: South East
- Country: England
- Sovereign state: United Kingdom
- Post town: NEWPORT
- Postcode district: PO30
- Dialling code: 01983
- Police: Hampshire and Isle of Wight
- Fire: Hampshire and Isle of Wight
- Ambulance: Isle of Wight
- UK Parliament: Isle of Wight West

Newtown is a small village in the civil parish of Calbourne, Newtown and Porchfield, on the Isle of Wight, England. In medieval times it was a thriving borough.

Newtown is located 5 miles (8 km) west of the town of Newport on the large natural harbour on the island's north-western coast. It is now mostly a national nature reserve owned and managed by the National Trust.

The Caul Bourne streams through Calbourne, passes Newbridge and Shalfleet and empties into the Solent at Newtown.

== Name ==
The name means 'the new town or borough', from Old English nīwe and tūn. It was originally called Francheville 'the free town' until the 16th century.

1189-1204: Niwetune

1254: nouum burgum de Francheuile

1255: Newtone

1257: Frauncheuile

1339: la Nywetone

1512: Newtowne alias Frauncheuyle

== History ==
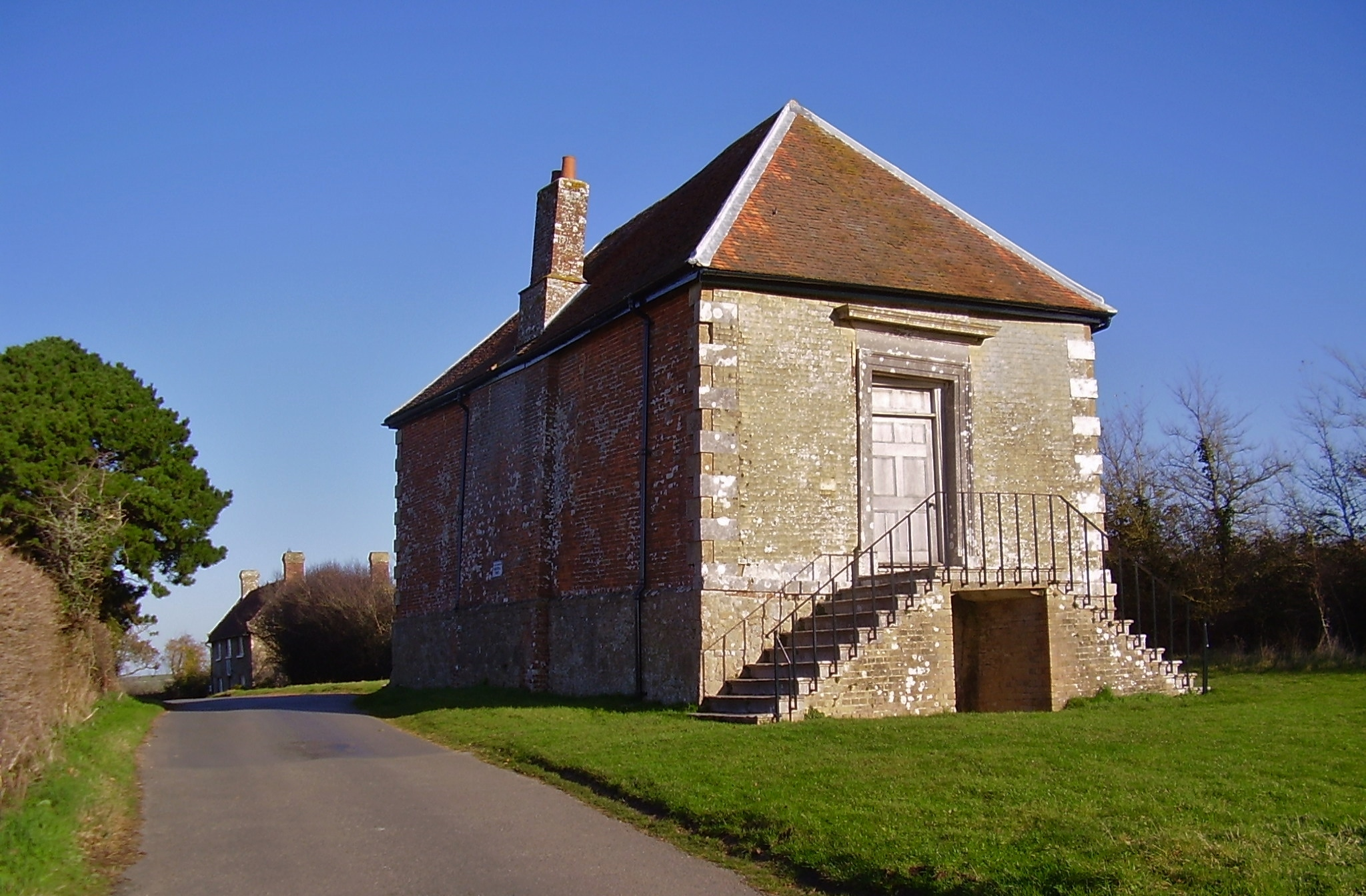
Newtown Town Hall

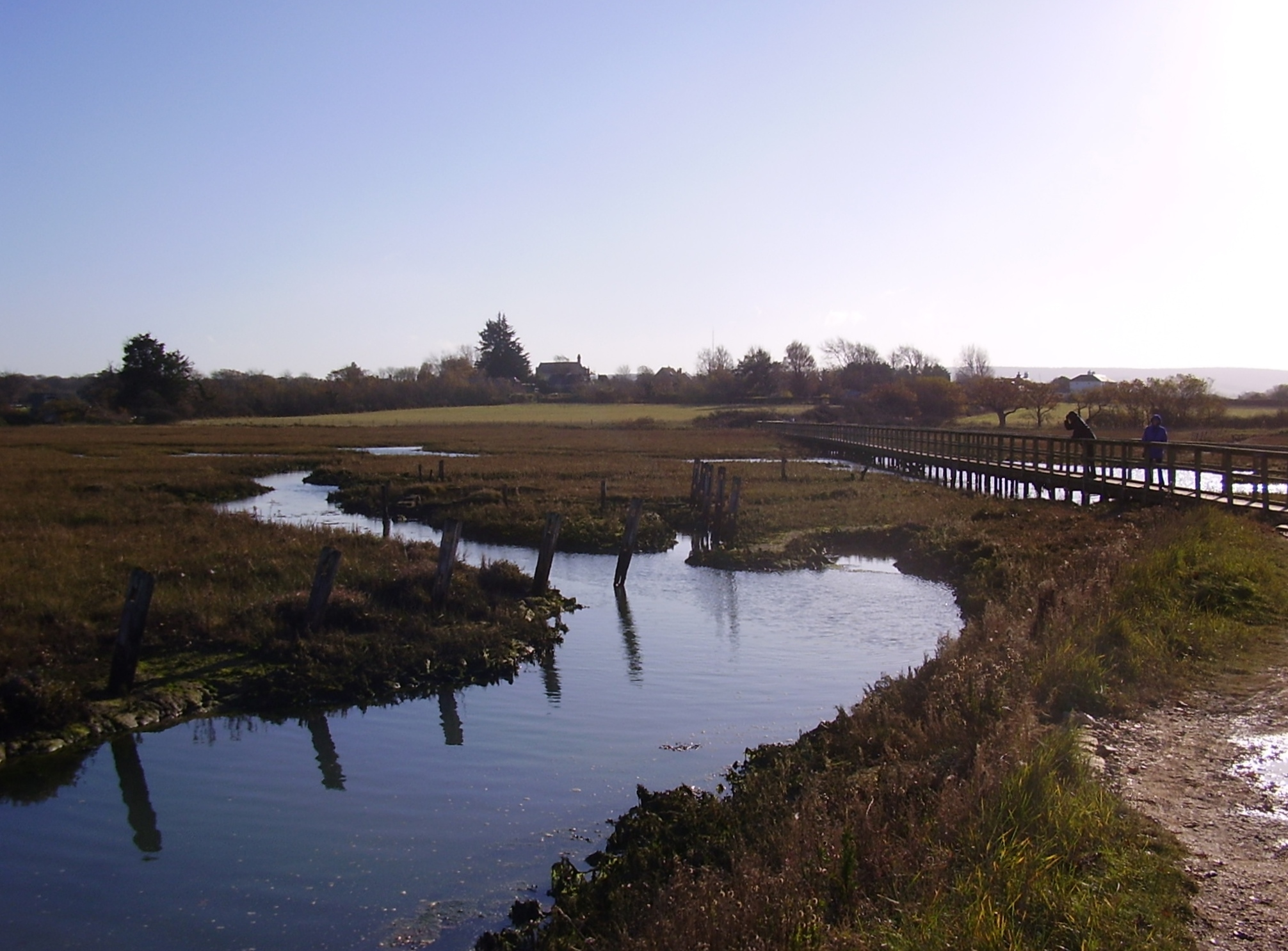
View over the marshes, with Newtown church on the skyline

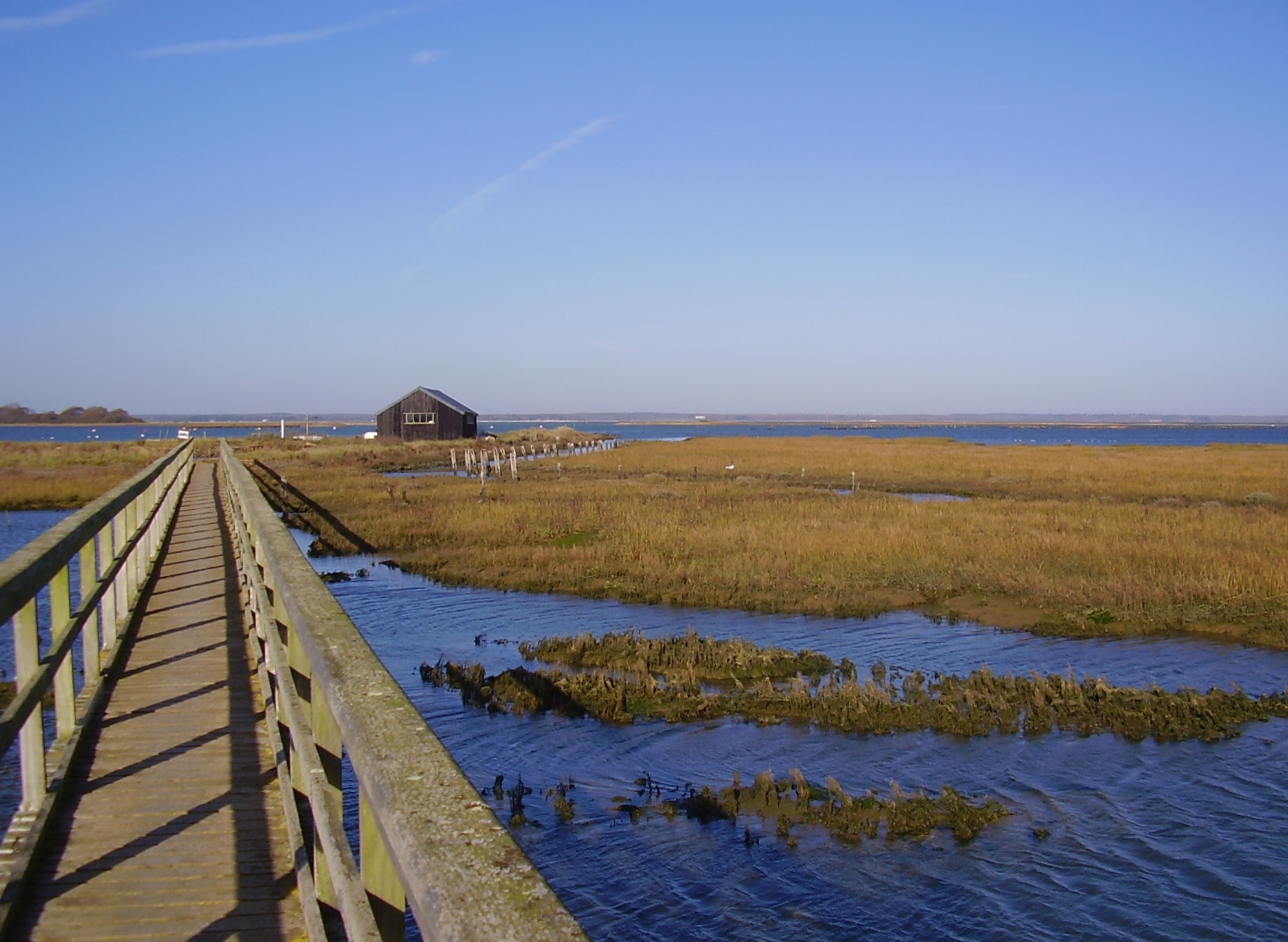
The harbour; looking north with the mainland in the far distance

The village was originally called Francheville (i.e. 'the free town'), and only later renamed Newtown in the 16th century. It was probably founded before the Norman Conquest. There is some indication that it was attacked by Danes in 1001.

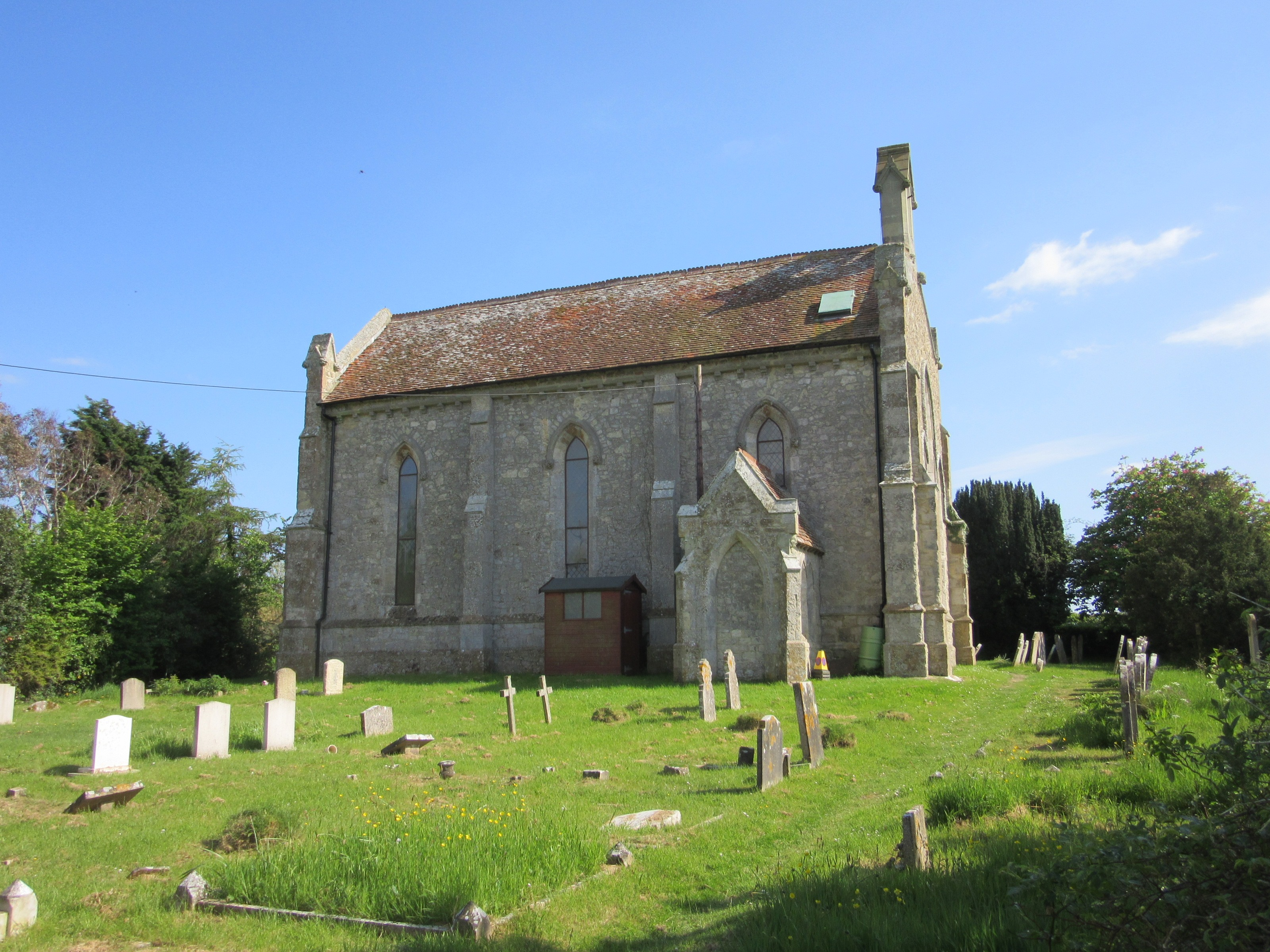
The Church of The Holy Spirit in Newtown.

The earliest known charter was granted by the Bishop-elect of Winchester, Aymer de Valence. He signed it at his ecclesiastical estate of Swainston Manor in 1256. The early hopes for its success are reflected in the names of its streets, such as Gold Street and Silver Street. However, it will have had competition from Yarmouth, Newport and Southampton. In 1284 it was somewhat reluctantly given to Edward I. Apparently there were about 60 families living in Newtown at the start of the 14th century. In 1318 Edward III granted it the right to a market and fair.

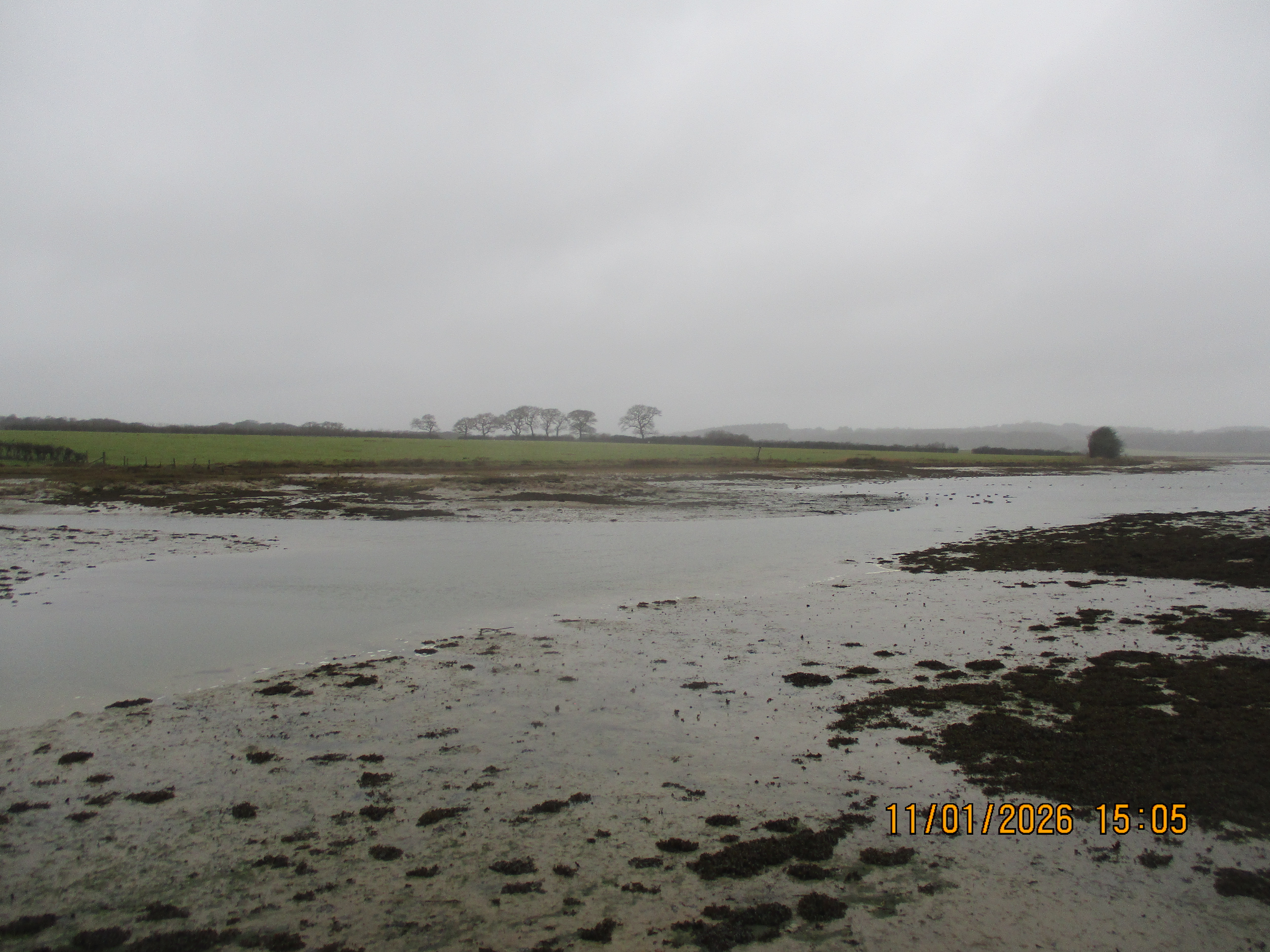
Causeway Lake, Newtown

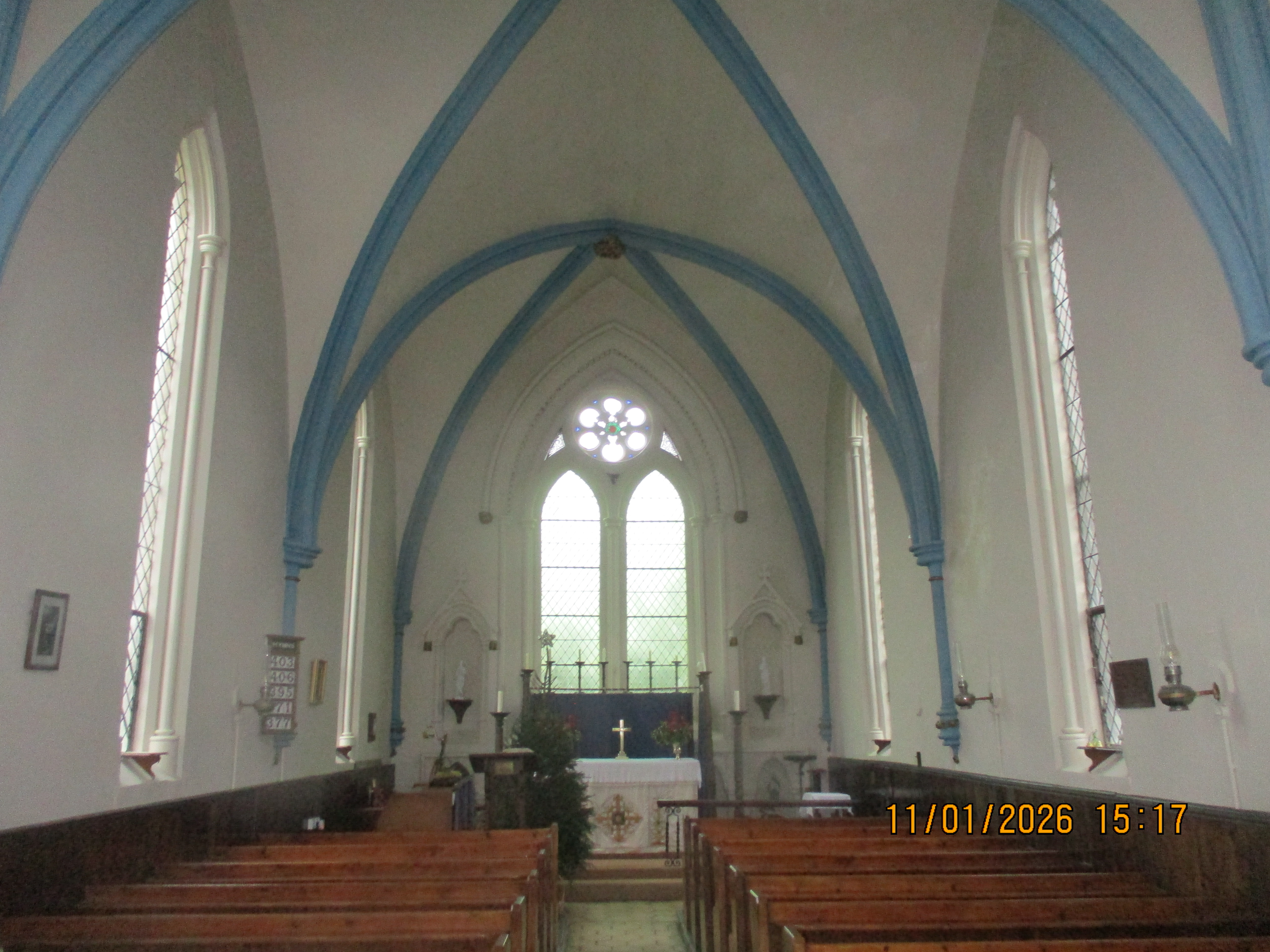
The inside of The Church of the Holy Spirit

By the mid 14th century, Newtown was starting to mature into a thriving commercial centre. In 1344, it was assessed at twice the value of Newport. Its harbour was busy and reputed to be the safest on the island. There was a prosperous saltworks and abundant oyster beds. There was an annual three-day festival on the "eve, the day and the morrow of the Feast of St. Mary Magdalen", who was honoured in the name of the local thirteenth-century chapel. Then, the great plague struck, and subsequently a French raid in 1377 destroyed much of the town, from which it never truly recovered.

The town's mace dating back to the reign of Henry VII survives in the collection of Carisbrooke Castle Museum.

By the middle of the 16th century, it was a small settlement eclipsed by the more easily defended town of Newport. A survey in 1559 noted that Newtown no longer had a market, and did not have a single good house still standing. Its harbour slowly became clogged with silt and inaccessible to larger vessels.

In the 1600s 11 houses were recorded.

In 1584 Elizabeth I breathed some life into the town by awarding it two parliamentary seats. Newtown Town Hall was built in the 17th century. However, these seats ultimately made Newtown borough one of the most notorious of the rotten boroughs, prevalent in the UK before the 19th century reforms. By the time of the 1832 Reform Act that abolished the seats, a survey found that Newtown had just fourteen houses and twenty-three voters, whilst massively larger municipal areas with many more voters had less representation.

In the 18th century, a 1.25 miles (2.01 km) long embankment was built in the habour, until 1954 when it was destroyed.

The town hall was restored in 1813, and again in the 1930s. It is now open to the public.

The Grade II listed, Church of The Holy Spirit was built in 1837.

The Newtown Arms Inn was closed in 1916. It was in an unusually shaped building referred to locally as "Noah's Ark."

Newtown remained small, but this has preserved its original layout, which is of historical interest. There are two square ponds by the boathouse, which were dug as salterns as part of the former local salt industry. The harbour and salterns have since become a habitat for fish native to the Isle of Wight and its surrounding waters, with large populations of Flathead grey mullet living in both the harbour and the salterns. Although there are a number of private residences still in use and the harbour is still accessible and used by small to medium vessels, Much of the land Newtown is situated on is now under the ownership of the National Trust, with the hamlet being at the centre of a nature reserve built around the old harbour. Newtown is popular with tourists and birdwatchers, as numerous uncommon native species use the salt marshes to nest.

== Legend ==
There are stories of a pied piper, hired for 50 pounds to save Newtown from an excess of rats, which are similar to the story of the Pied Piper of Hamelin, Germany. He is said to have played his pipe and led the rats into the Solent, where they drowned. The townspeople refused to pay the agreed price, and gave the piper 20 pounds, so he then led the children away. The town lost an entire generation, so had no young people to defend it when the French attacked in 1377.

== Transport ==
Southern Vectis operates an infrequent bus route 35, Newbridge to Newport, via Newtown, Porchfield and Mark's Corner.
