= 1957 Aquila Airways Solent crash =

Aviation accident in England

- Aquila Airways Short Solent G-AKNU

Accident
- Date: 15 November 1957
- Summary: Engine stoppage
- Site: Near Chessell, Isle of Wight, England; 50°40′05″N 1°26′37″W

Aircraft
- Aircraft type: Short Solent 3
- Aircraft name: City of Sidney
- Operator: Aquila Airways
- Registration: G-AKNU
- Flight origin: Southampton Water
- Passengers: 50
- Crew: 8
- Fatalities: 45
- Survivors: 13

The 1957 Aquila Airways Solent crash occurred on the Isle of Wight in England on 15 November. With 45 lives lost, at the time it was the second worst aircraft accident within the United Kingdom, then at the time the worst ever air disaster to occur on English soil until it was superseded by the Stockport air disaster, in 1967.

== Accident sequence ==
The aircraft, an Aquila Airways Short Solent 3 flying boat named the City of Sydney, registered G-AKNU, departed Southampton Water at 22:46 on a night flight to Las Palmas and Madeira via Lisbon. At 22:54, the crew radioed to report that the number 4 propeller had been feathered (No. 4 engine feathered. Coming back in a hurry. ). During an attempt to return, the Solent crashed into a disused chalk pit adjacent to heavily forested downland. The crash site is on a steep eastern slope of Shalcombe Down, above the small villages of Chessell and Shalcombe. At the time of impact, the plane was banked 45 degrees to the right, the same side of the aircraft that had lost all engine power according to the accident report. The aircraft caught fire on impact. However, three soldiers on a night-exercise were close by when the crash happened and were on the scene within minutes; they managed to rescue some of the survivors from the burning wreckage, suffering burns as they did so.

Except for the tail, the aircraft was destroyed. Of the 58 on board, 45 were killed and 13 injured. Initially 43 perished, but two more later succumbed to their injuries.

In the days following, the crash-site became a scene of morbid interest and crowds of people came to see it; a police presence was required to keep them at distance.

== Possible causes ==
A public inquiry by the Air Accidents Investigation Branch of the Ministry of Transport concluded that the essential cause remains unknown. The accident was caused by the stoppage of the No.3 engine while the No.4 engine was also stopped. What caused the initial failure of the No.4 engine is unknown. The cause of the subsequent number 3 engine stoppage was either an electrical failure in the fuel cutoff actuator circuit or the accidental operation of the cutoff switch.

== Legacy ==
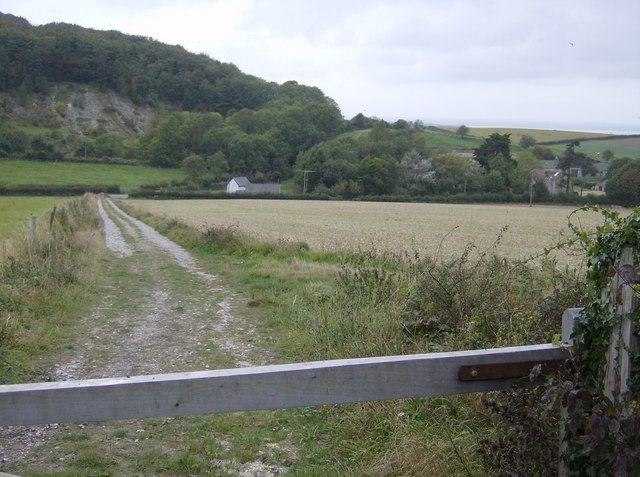
The crash site in 2007. Visible to the left, as a scar on the forested slope of Shalcombe Down, is the disused chalk pit where the aircraft crashed

The soldiers who rescued crash survivors later received awards for their actions; Major W.J.F. Weller and Lieutenant J.R. Sherbourn were made Members of the Order of the British Empire, Company quartermaster sergeant J.W. Reid, was awarded the British Empire Medal.

Aquila Airways, after operating for 10 years announced in July 1958 it would cease operations, nine months after the crash.

A 50th anniversary memorial service was held in the village of Brook, Isle of Wight on 18 November 2007 to commemorate the lives lost. In October 2008 a permanent memorial was dedicated at Brook's St Mary's Church, about 0.7 miles (1.1 km) due south of the crash site.
