= Five Houses, Isle of Wight =

Hamlet on the Isle of Wight, England

Coordinates: 50.687602°N 1.395238°W

Five Houses
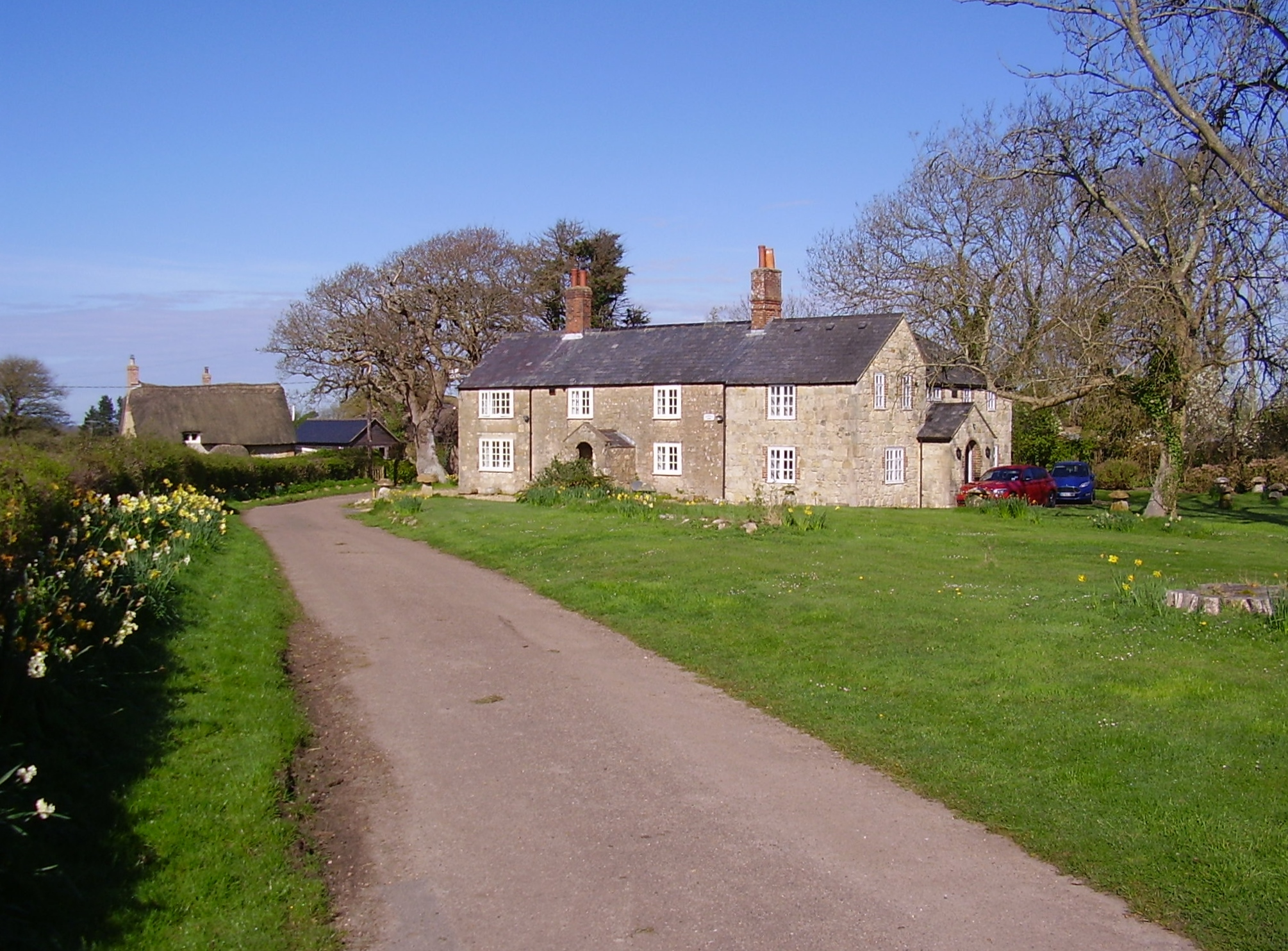

- Location within the Isle of Wight
- OS grid reference: SZ429877
- Civil parish: Calbourne, Newtown and Porchfield
- Unitary authority: Isle of Wight
- Ceremonial county: Isle of Wight
- Region: South East
- Country: England
- Sovereign state: United Kingdom
- Post town: NEWPORT
- Postcode district: PO30
- Dialling code: 01983
- Police: Hampshire and Isle of Wight
- Fire: Hampshire and Isle of Wight
- Ambulance: Isle of Wight
- UK Parliament: Isle of Wight West

Five Houses is a hamlet on the Isle of Wight, off the south coast of England. The settlement is in the civil parish of Calbourne, Newtown and Porchfield.

The hamlet lies to the south of the A3054 road, near to the larger village of Calbourne. Five Houses is approximately 4.5 miles (7.2 km) west of Newport.
