= Mark's Corner =

Coordinates: 50.7254°N 1.3378°W

- Hamlet
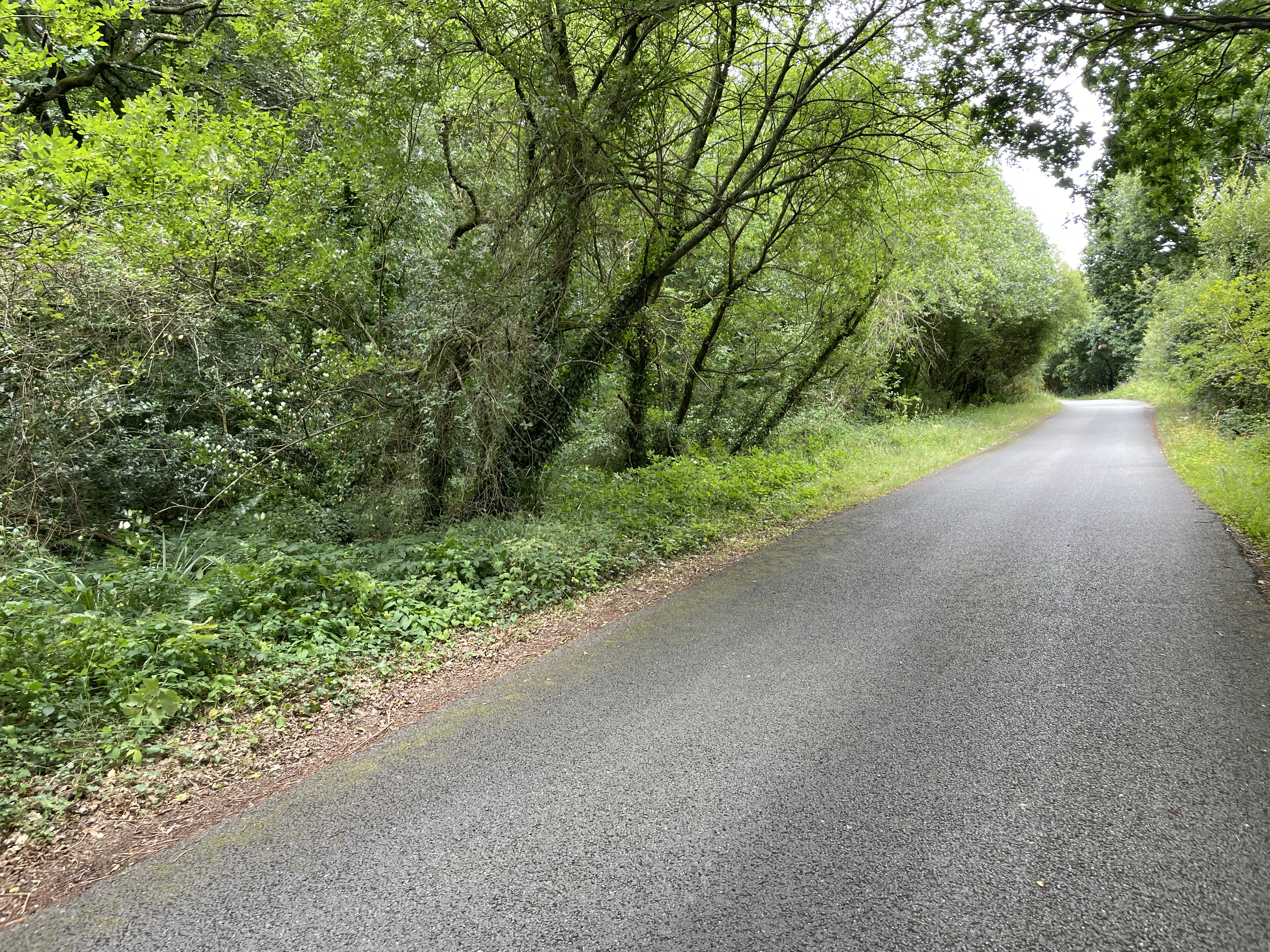
- Road to Mark's Corner

- Location within the Isle of Wight
- OS grid reference: SZ4697391952
- Civil parish: Newport and Carisbrooke; Calbourne, Newtown and Porchfield
- Unitary authority: Isle of Wight
- Ceremonial county: Isle of Wight
- Region: South East
- Country: England
- Sovereign state: United Kingdom
- Post town: NEWPORT
- Postcode district: PO30
- Police: Hampshire and Isle of Wight
- Fire: Hampshire and Isle of Wight
- Ambulance: Isle of Wight

Mark's Corner (also spelled Marks Corner) is a hamlet on the Isle of Wight, in the civil parishes of Newport and Carisbrooke and Calbourne, Newtown and Porchfield, north of Parkhust Forest. It is located 66 metres (216 feet) above sea level, and is located 4 kilometers (2.5 miles) from the centre of the county town, Newport.

== Name ==
It was named after Mark Harvey, who owned land there in the 17th century.

== Location ==
Mark's Corner is located in the civil parishes of Newport and Carisbrooke and Calbourne, Newtown and Porchfield, and in the PO30 postcode.

According to Ordnance Survey maps, there is an unnamed stream and wells in and around the forest near Mark's Corner, and there are two farms, called Stagwell Farm and Jubilee Farm.

There used to be brickmaking operations in the hamlet by the Pritchett family.

== Methodist chapel ==
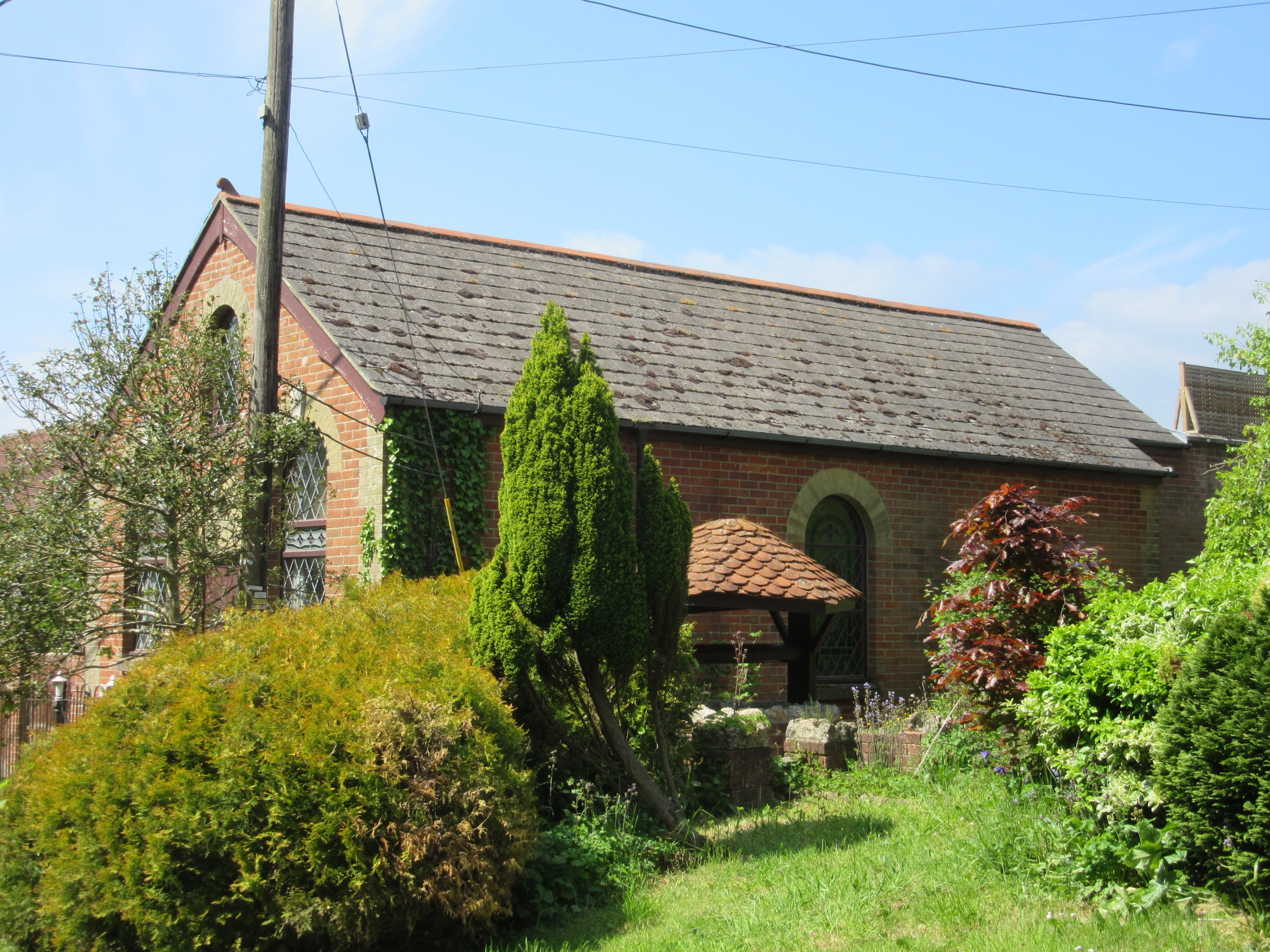
The Methodist chapel in May 2016.

A Primitive Methodist chapel was built in Mark's Corner by Mr. H Mew from Porchfield in July 1833, with space for 100 people. It was closed in the mid 20th century, now a private residence.

Formerly, there was a World War 1 memorial in the chapel, but has now been moved to Calbourne Military Museum, at the Calbourne Mill. It was installed in January and February of 1921, made by H Osborne from Ryde.
