= Thorsness =

Thorsness is a surname. Notable people with the surname include:

- Kristen Thorsness (born 1960), American rower
- Leo K. Thorsness (1932–2017), United States Air Force officer and Medal of Honor recipient

== See also ==
- Thorness (disambiguation)
