= River Caul Bourne =

Stream on the Isle of Wight, England

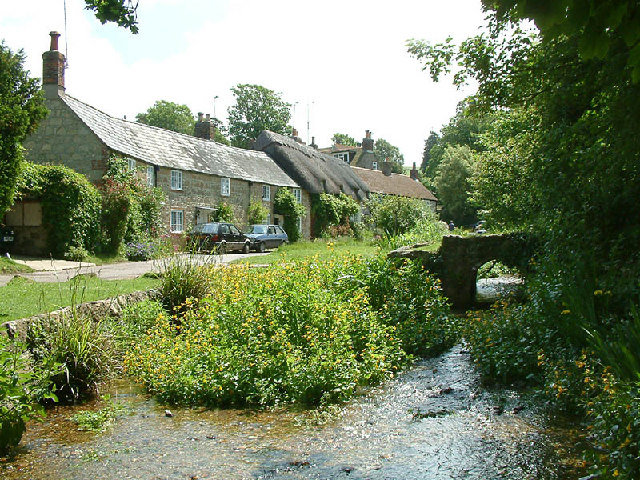
Winkle Street (also known as Barrington Row) in Calbourne, with the Caul Bourne running in front of the houses.

The Caul Bourne is a chalk stream on the Isle of Wight, England.

== Etymology ==
The name Caul Bourne is first attested in a thirteenth-century copy of a charter from 826, where it appears as "Cawelburnan". The burn element is a common Old English word for "stream, river". The cawel element has traditionally been taken to be the Old English word that is the ancestor of Present-Day English "kale" (borrowed into Old English from Latin caulis, "stem, brassica"): perhaps the river was named for brassicas growing on its course. A more recent suggestion is that the cawel element is another Old English word, meaning "basket" (also borrowed into Old English, from Latin *cavellum, "basket"). In this case, the baskets were perhaps fish-traps, and the river was named for their use in it.

== Geography ==
The stream is 3 miles (5 km) long from source to the start of the Newtown River Estuary just below Shalfleet. Its source is in an ornamental lake, near Winkle Street in Calbourne, from which it runs to the north (like most other rivers on the Isle of Wight) through Newbridge and Shalfleet. It is joined by several tributaries before flowing into The Solent via Newtown estuary, a Site of Special Scientific Interest.

The river was subject to flooding in December 1993 when a longer than normal period of precipitation (over 8 hours of rainfall) led to four houses in Shalfleet suffering £36,000 of damage between them.
