= Chessell =

Hamlet on the Isle of Wight, England

Coordinates: 50.6725°N 1.4287°W

- Hamlet
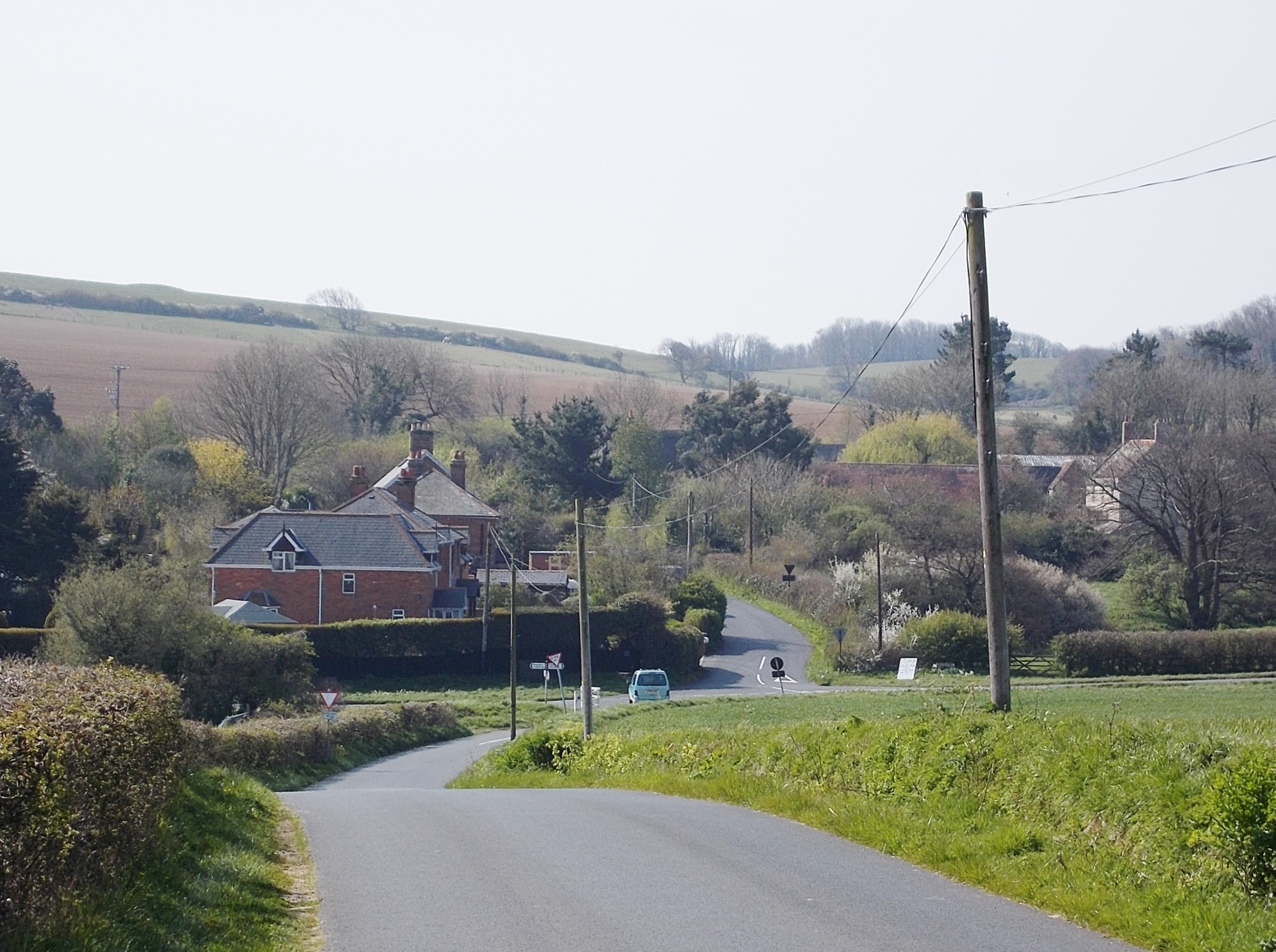
- The hamlet of Chessell

- Location within the Isle of Wight
- OS grid reference: SZ3978685744
- Civil parish: Calbourne, Newtown and Porchfield; Shalfleet
- Unitary authority: Isle of Wight
- Ceremonial county: Isle of Wight
- Region: South East
- Country: England
- Sovereign state: United Kingdom
- Postcode district: PO
- Police: Hampshire and Isle of Wight
- Fire: Hampshire and Isle of Wight
- Ambulance: Isle of Wight

For people with the surname, see Chessell (surname).

Chessell is a hamlet in the civil parish of Calbourne, Newtown and Porchfield, on the Isle of Wight, England, towards the west in an area known as the Back of the Wight partly on the B3401 road, near Shalcombe. Public transport used to be provided by the Southern Vectis route Summer Links. It is the location of the Chessell Pottery Barns, a popular tourist attraction.

== Name ==
The name probably means 'the hill where chests or coffins were found, referencing an important 6th century pagan Jutish cemetery on Chessell Down, from Old English cest and hyll.

1193-1217: Chestelon

1228: Chesthull

1278: Chestull

1280: Cheshulle

1301: Chestelle

1769: (Little) Chestle

The suffix -(l)on may be Old English lanu or land (lane or land) or an Old French diminutive suffix -on.
