= Calbourne, Newtown and Porchfield =

- Civil parish
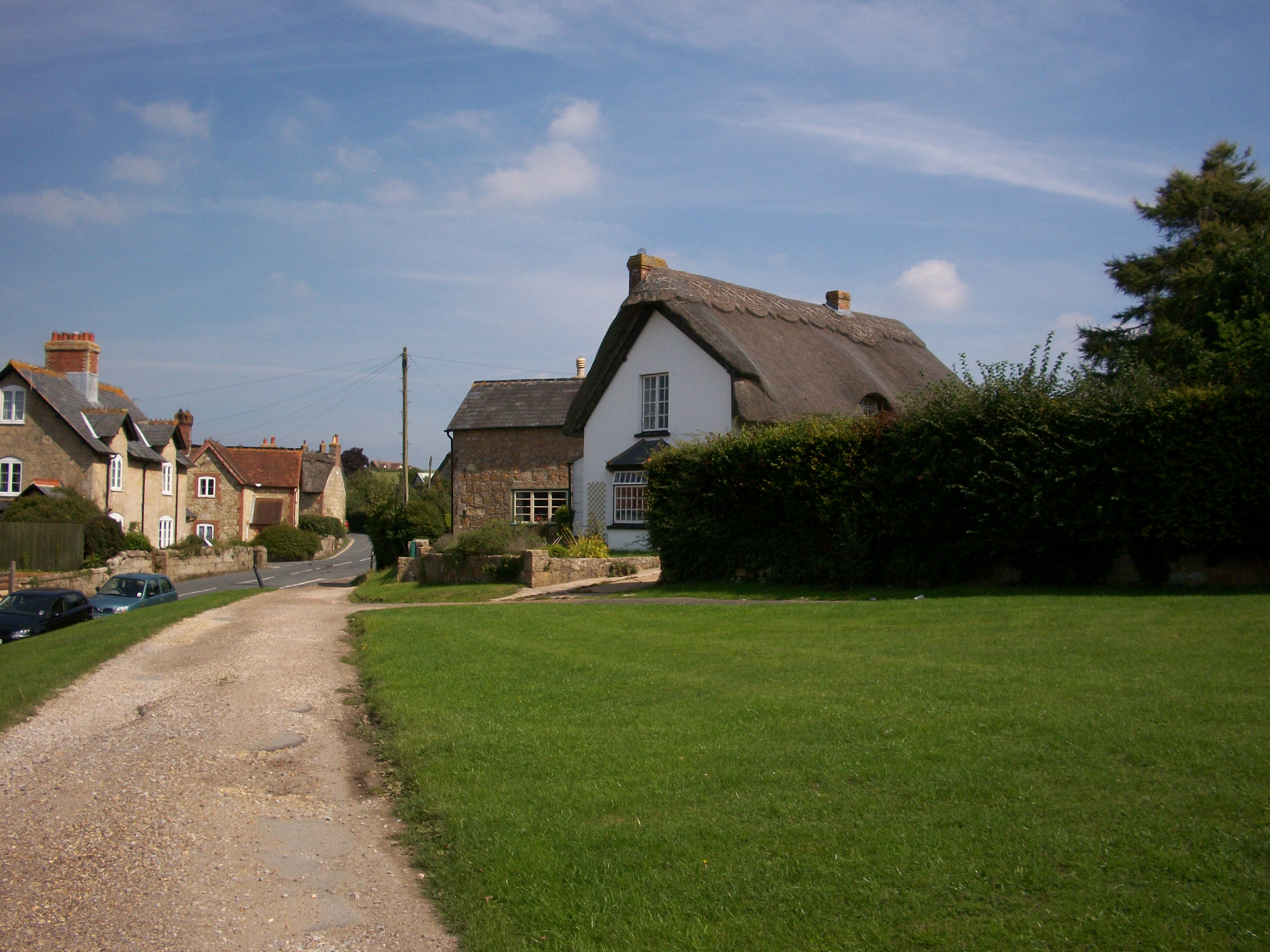
- Calbourne
- Interactive map of Calbourne, Newtown and Porchfield
- Coordinates: 50.711286°N 1.3827727°W
- Country: England
- Primary council: Isle of Wight
- County: Isle of Wight
- Region: South East
- Status: Parish
- Main settlements: Calbourne, Chessell, Five Houses, Great Thorness, Little Whitehouse, Locksgreen, Mark's Corner, Newtown and Porchfield

Area
  - Total: 31.48 km^{2} (12.15 sq mi)

Population (2011)
  - Total: 886
  - Density: 28.1/km^{2} (72.9/sq mi)
- Website: http://www.calbourneparishcouncil.org.uk/

Calbourne, Newtown and Porchfield (formerly just Calbourne) is a civil parish on the Isle of Wight, in the county of the Isle of Wight, England. The parish includes the settlements of Calbourne, Chessell, Five Houses, Great Thorness, Little Whitehouse, Locksgreen, Mark's Corner, Newtown and Porchfield. In 2011 the parish had a population of 886. The parish touches Brighstone, Gurnard, Newport and Carisbrooke, Northwood and Shalfleet. There are 81 listed buildings in Calbourne, Newtown and Porchfield.

== History ==
On 24 March 1889 part of Shalfleet parish was transferred to Calbourne, on 1 April 1933 Northwood parish was abolished and part of it went to Calbourne. The parish was renamed from "Calbourne" to "Calbourne, Newtown and Porchfield" on 16 May 2019.
