= Shalcombe =

Hamlet on the Isle of Wight, England

Coordinates: 50°40′08″N 1°26′30″W

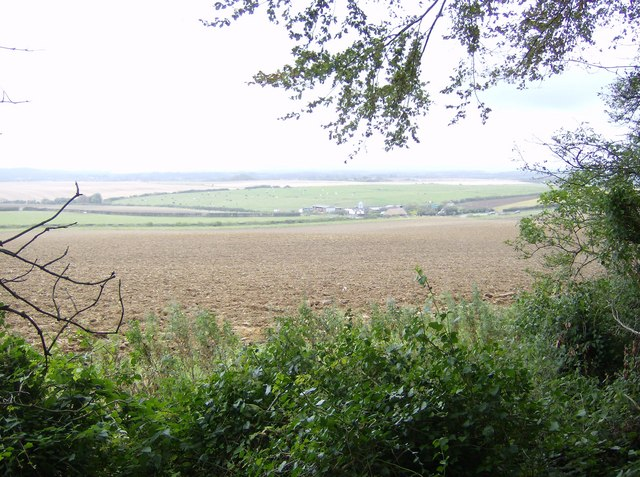
View towards Shalcombe

Shalcombe is a hamlet on the Isle of Wight towards the west in an area known as West Wight, near the hamlet of Chessell. It is in the civil parish of Shalfleet and the PO41 postcode district. It is situated along the B3399 road and is about 3.5 miles (5.6 km) east of Freshwater. There are 3 grade II listed buildings in the hamlet: Central Barn at Shalcombe Manor, Columbarium at Shalcombe Manor and Shalcombe Manor itself.

== Name ==
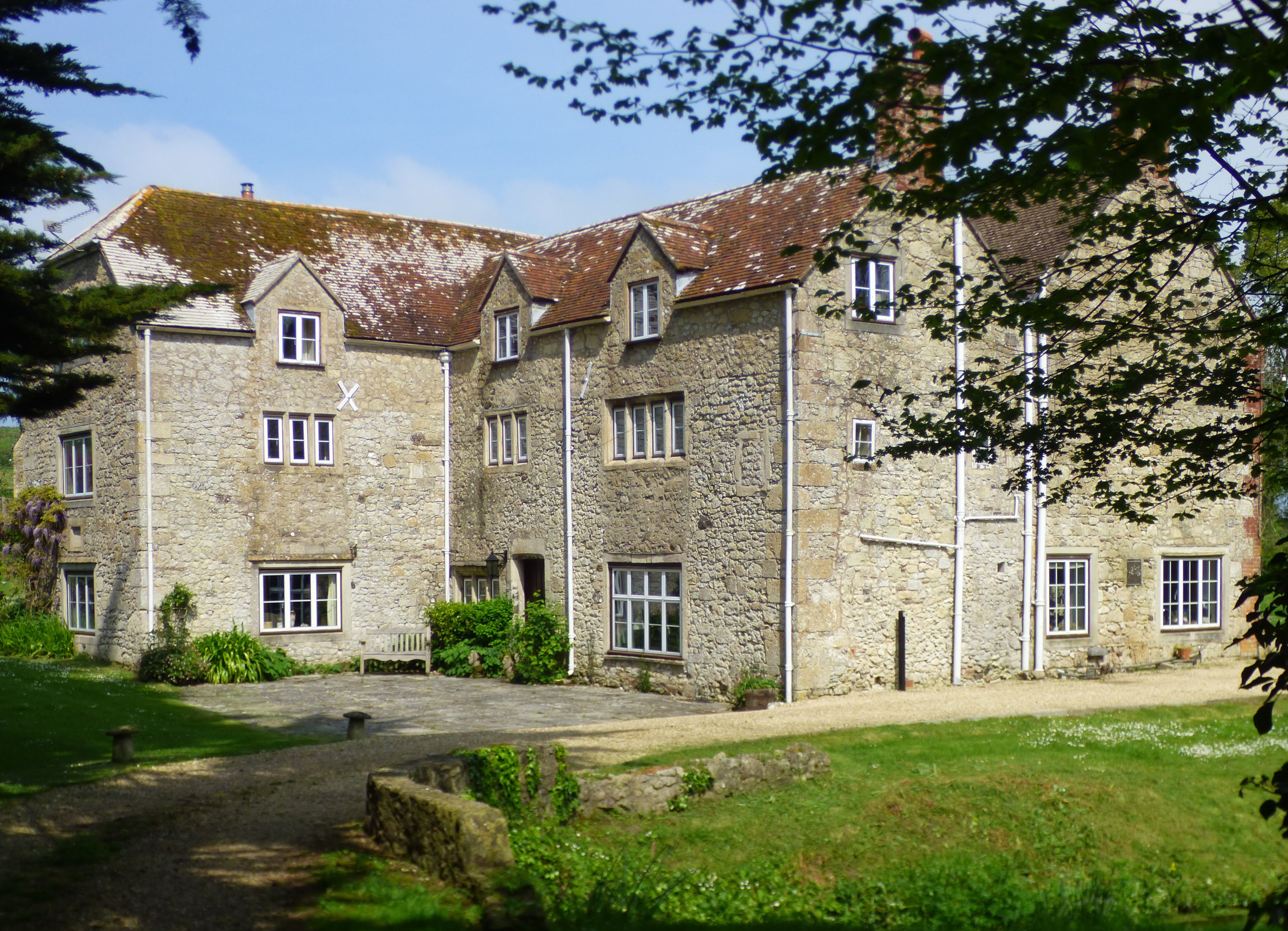
Shalcombe Manor

The name means 'the shadow valley', 'the shaded valley', from Old English sceald and cumb.

1086 (Domesday Book): Eseldecome

1142-1147: Scaldecumbe

1151-1161: Eschaldecumbe

1284: Shaldecumb

1526: Shalcome

== History ==
A partially-excavated Bronze Age bell barrow is on Shalcombe Down, lying in a prominent position. It measures 24 metres (79 ft) from north to south, 26 metres (85 ft) east to west and 3 metres (9.8 ft) high. There is a berm 5 metres (16 ft) wide and a quarried outer ditch. It was opened in 1816 by J. Dennett, who found bronze weapons, a brooch and bone or ivory ornaments.

During 1066, at the Domesday Book, it was worth 3 pounds and its lord was Alwin Frost. In 1086, it had a population of 1 household, a value of 4 pounds, 2 ploughlands and 2 lord's ploughteams. Its lord and tenant-in-chief was Carisbrooke (St Nicholas), church of.

=== 1957 Aquila Airways Solent Crash ===
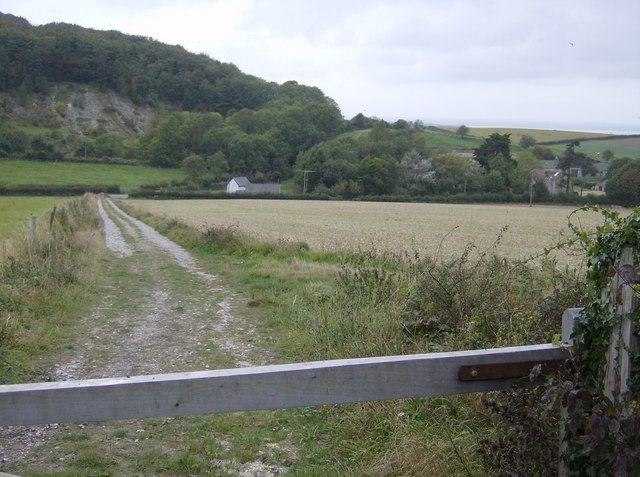
The crash site today

In 1957, an Aquila Airways Short Solent 3 flying boat called The City of Sydney, crashed up Shalcombe Down. It was on a night-flight to Las Palmas and Madeira via Lisbon, departing from Southampton Water. Around 10 minutes after they set off, the crew reported that the number four engine had been feathered. During an attempt to return, they crashed in a heavily forested, disused chalk pit. Of the 58 passengers, 45 were killed and 13 injured.
