= Locksgreen, Isle of Wight =

Hamlet on the Isle of Wight

Coordinates: 50.7144°N 1.3725°W

Locksgreen
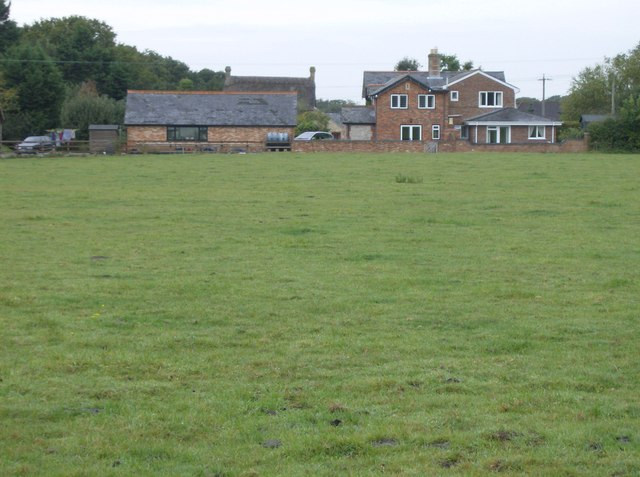
- A farmhouse at Locksgreen

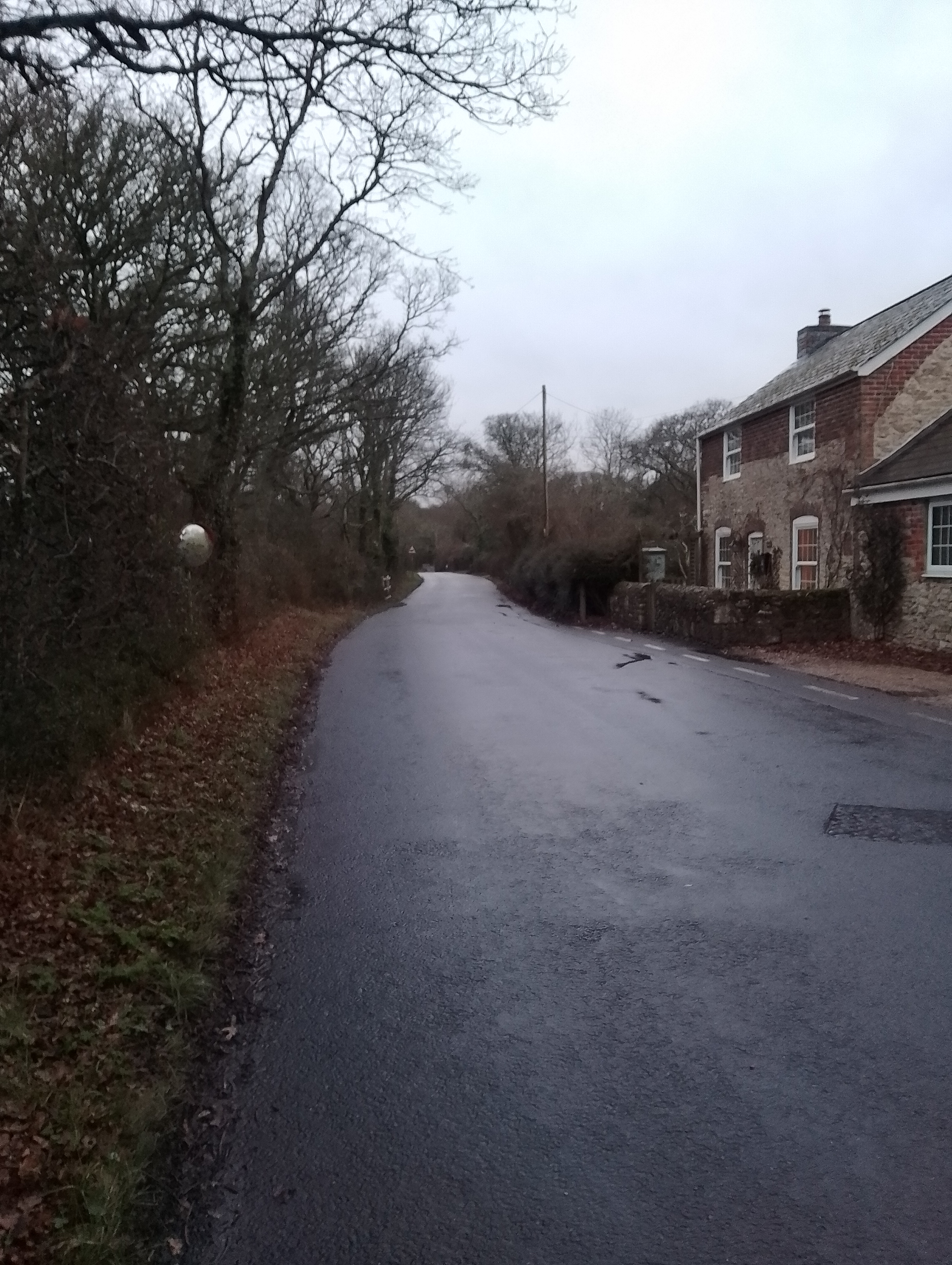
- The main road through Locksgreen, Locks Green Road

- Location within the Isle of Wight
- Civil parish: Calbourne, Newtown and Porchfield
- Unitary authority: Isle of Wight
- Ceremonial county: Isle of Wight
- Region: South East
- Country: England
- Sovereign state: United Kingdom
- Police: Hampshire and Isle of Wight
- Fire: Hampshire and Isle of Wight
- Ambulance: Isle of Wight

Locksgreen (also spelt Locks Green or Lock's Green) is a hamlet on the Isle of Wight, in the civil parish of Calbourne, Newtown and Porchfield. There are 2 Grade II listed buildings in the hamlet, called Locks Green Dairy and Locks Farmhouse.

The hamlet borders a site of special scientific interest, the Newtown Harbour SSSI.

== Name ==
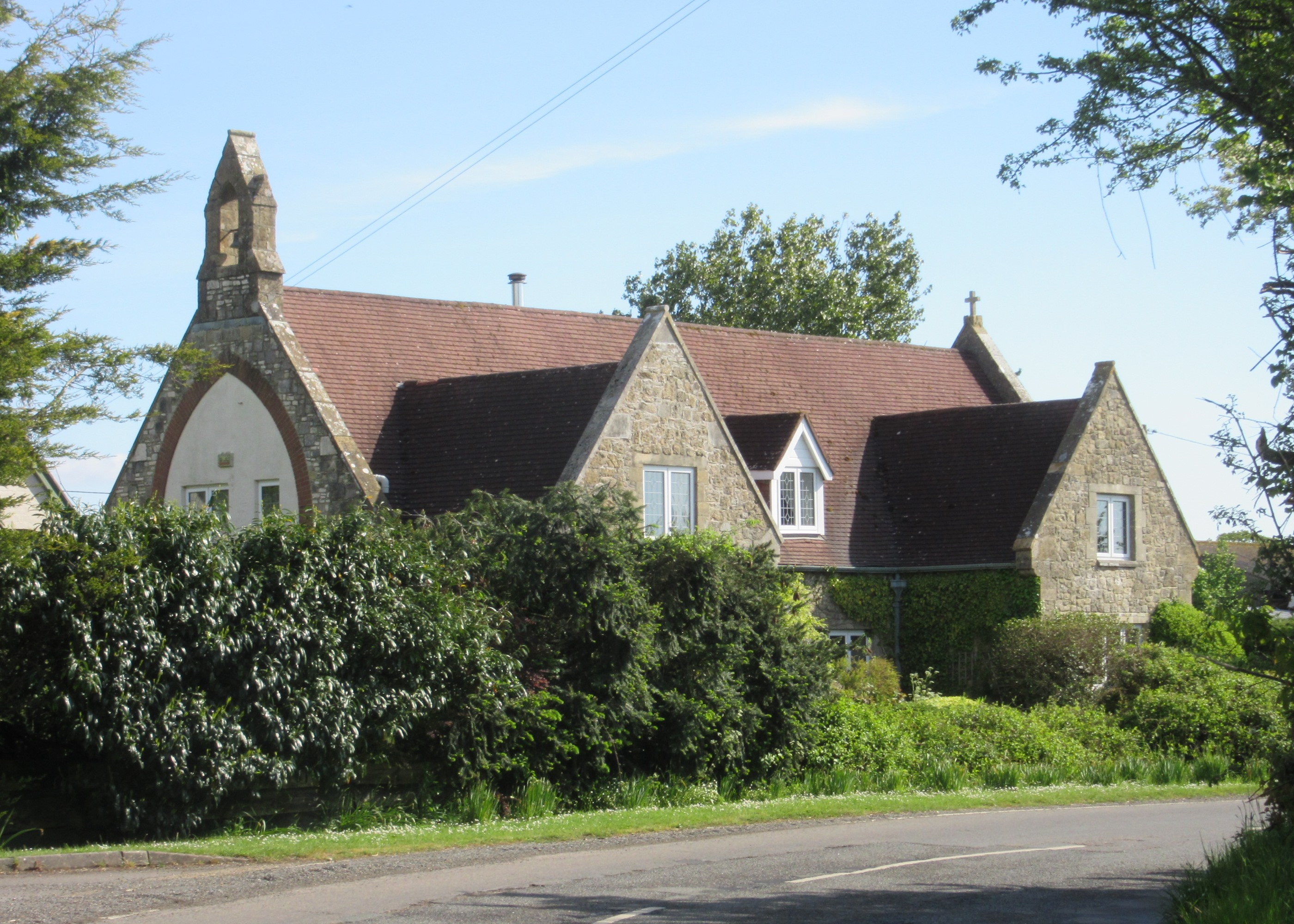
Former school and chapel in Locksgreen

The name derives from the surname Lokke, a family who possessed land there from the 14th century. Other names derived from the surname are Lokkesland (1387), Lockesplace (1507) and (Little) Locks (1769).

== School ==
The school in Locksgreen opened in the 1800s closed in 1949, with the pupils being transferred to the Shalfleet School. Fred Long, who attended the school, and farmed at Westover, Park Place and Hillis farms said:

Yeah, the teachers at Locks Green were typical old schoolmarms. You know. Seemed to me they just had a grudge against nippers. Because a lot of 'em, see, it was just after the war and they'd 'a' lost their boyfriends and that, in the war and they had a grudge against you.
