= All Saints' Church, Calbourne =

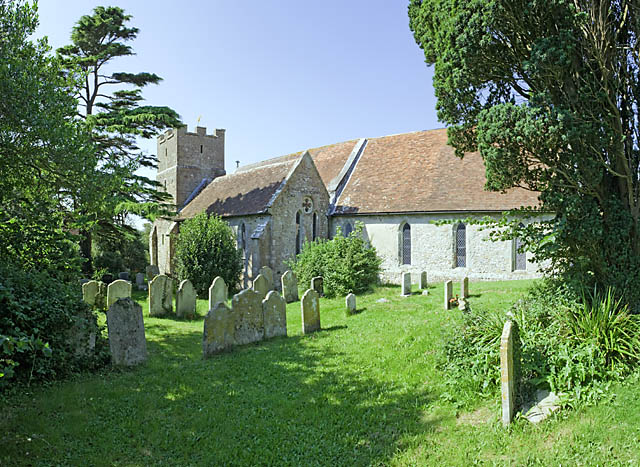
- All Saints' Church, Calbourne
- 50°40′38″N 01°23′58″W
- Denomination: Church of England
- Churchmanship: Broad Church

History
- Dedication: All Saints

Administration
- Province: Canterbury
- Diocese: Portsmouth
- Parish: Calbourne

All Saints' Church, Calbourne is a parish church in the Church of England located in Calbourne, Isle of Wight.

== History ==
The church is medieval. The tower was rebuilt in 1752. The churchyard contains Commonwealth war graves of two British Army soldiers of World War I.

== Church status ==
The church is grouped with Holy Spirit Church, Newtown.

== Organ ==
The church has a one manual organ dating from 1873 by Forster and Andrews. A specification of the organ can be found on the National Pipe Organ Register.
