= Newbridge, Isle of Wight =

Hamlet on the Isle of Wight, England

Coordinates: 50.68725°N 1.42009°W

Newbridge
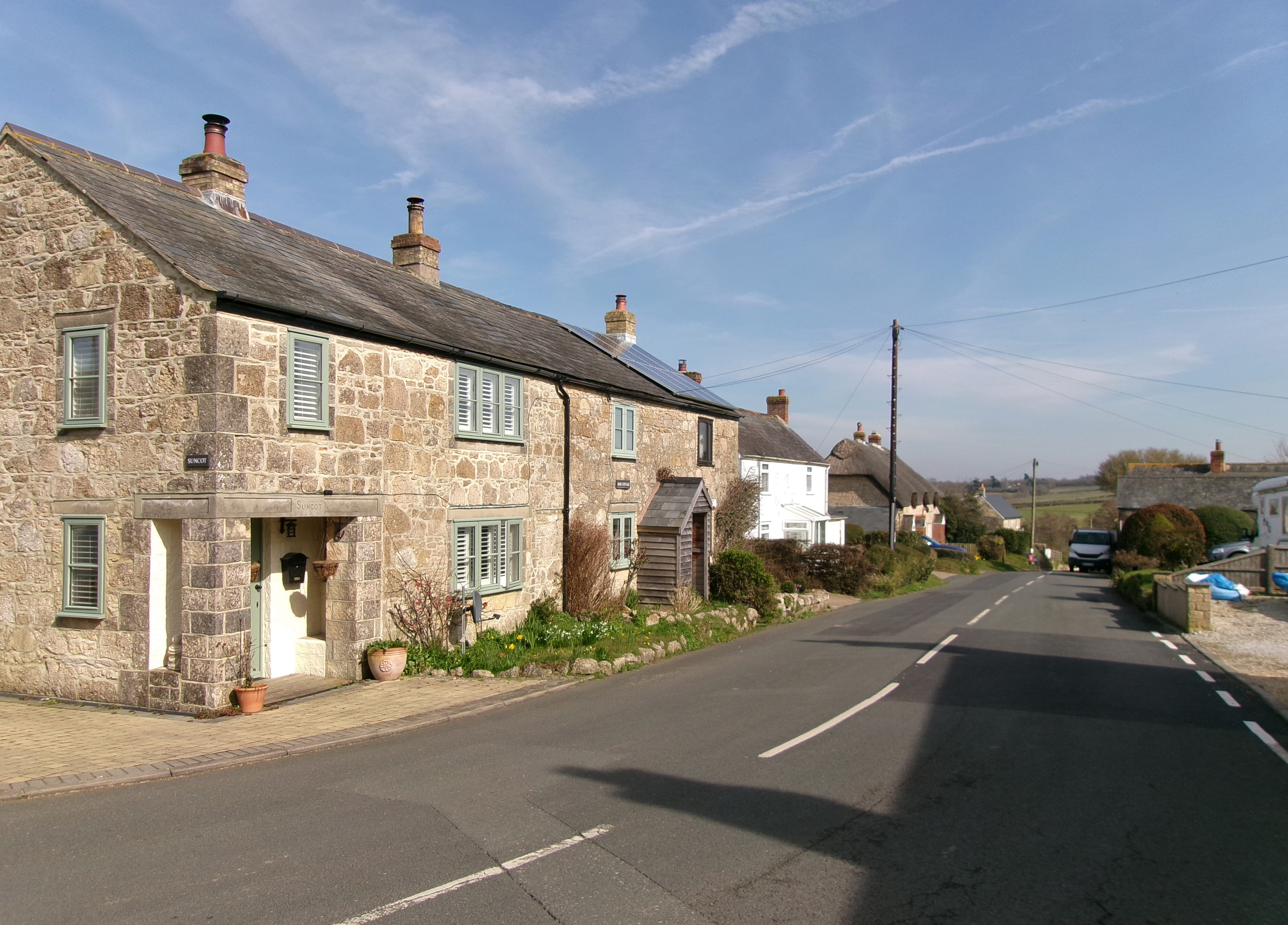
- Main Road, Newbridge

- Location within the Isle of Wight
- OS grid reference: SZ410876
- Civil parish: Shalfleet
- Unitary authority: Isle of Wight
- Ceremonial county: Isle of Wight
- Region: South East
- Country: England
- Sovereign state: United Kingdom
- Post town: YARMOUTH
- Postcode district: PO41
- Dialling code: 01983
- Police: Hampshire and Isle of Wight
- Fire: Hampshire and Isle of Wight
- Ambulance: Isle of Wight
- UK Parliament: Isle of Wight West

Newbridge is a hamlet on the Isle of Wight. It is situated on a small hill, nine kilometres to the west of Newport on the western half of the island. It is in the civil parish of Shalfleet.

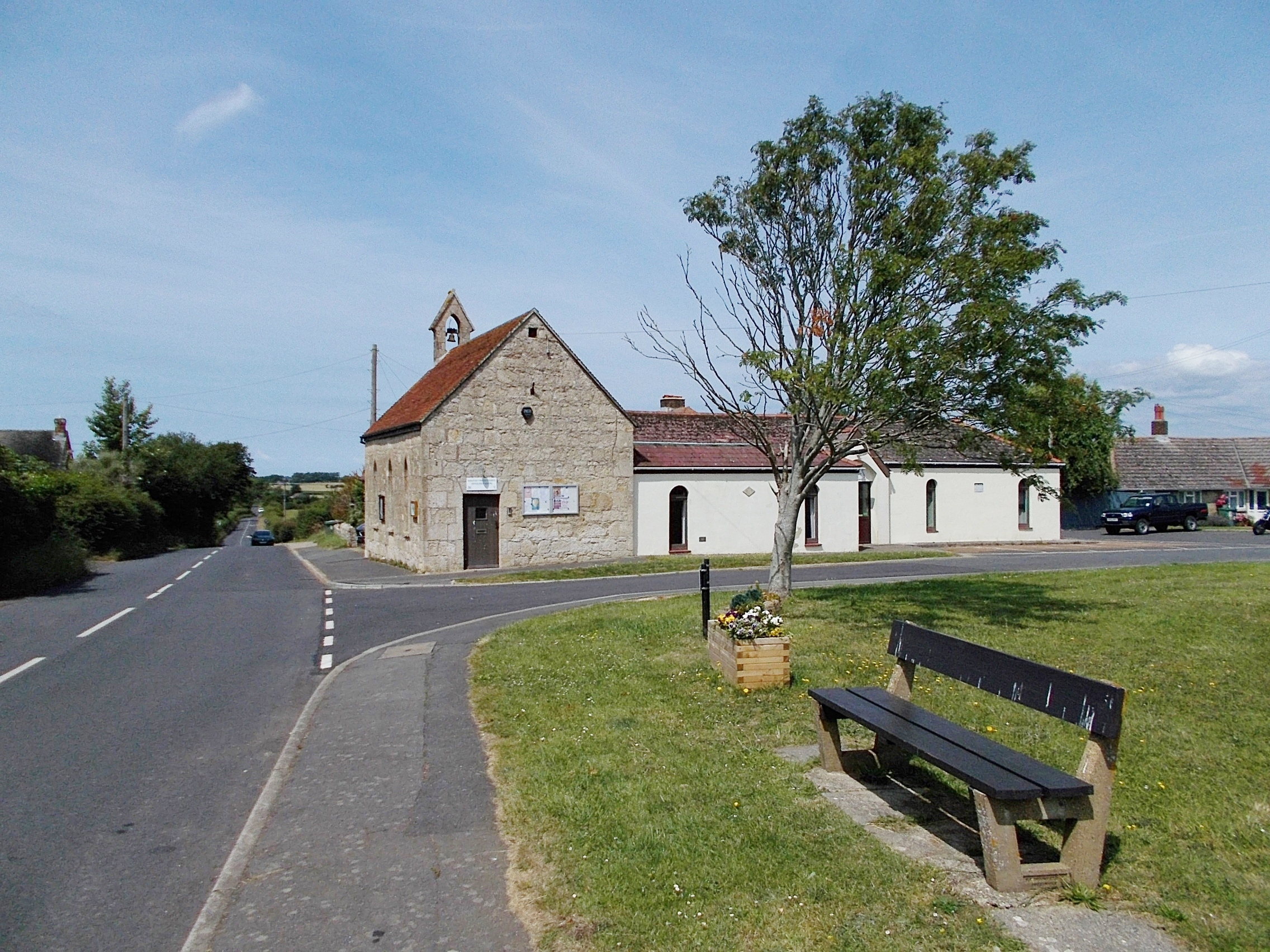
Former Chapel in Newbridge

The village has a social club, situated in the old school house, and a holiday park with indoor and outdoor swimming pools and the village's only remaining shop.

There have never been any churches in Newbridge but the hamlet did have two chapels. One was demolished in the early 1980s and the remaining Newbridge Wesleyan Methodist Chapel is now part of a residence.

The name Newbridge is explained by the bridge near the edge of the village which crosses the Calbourne this being literally the "New Bridge". The Calbourne stream runs through nearby Calbourne passing through Newbridge and Shalfleet and discharges into the Solent at Newtown.

Newbridge is served by Southern Vectis bus route 7.
