= Thorness =

Thorness may refer to the following places in England:

- Great Thorness, hamlet on the Isle of Wight
- Little Thorness, hamlet on the Isle of Wight
- Thorness Bay, bay on the Isle of Wight
