= Holy Spirit Church, Newtown =

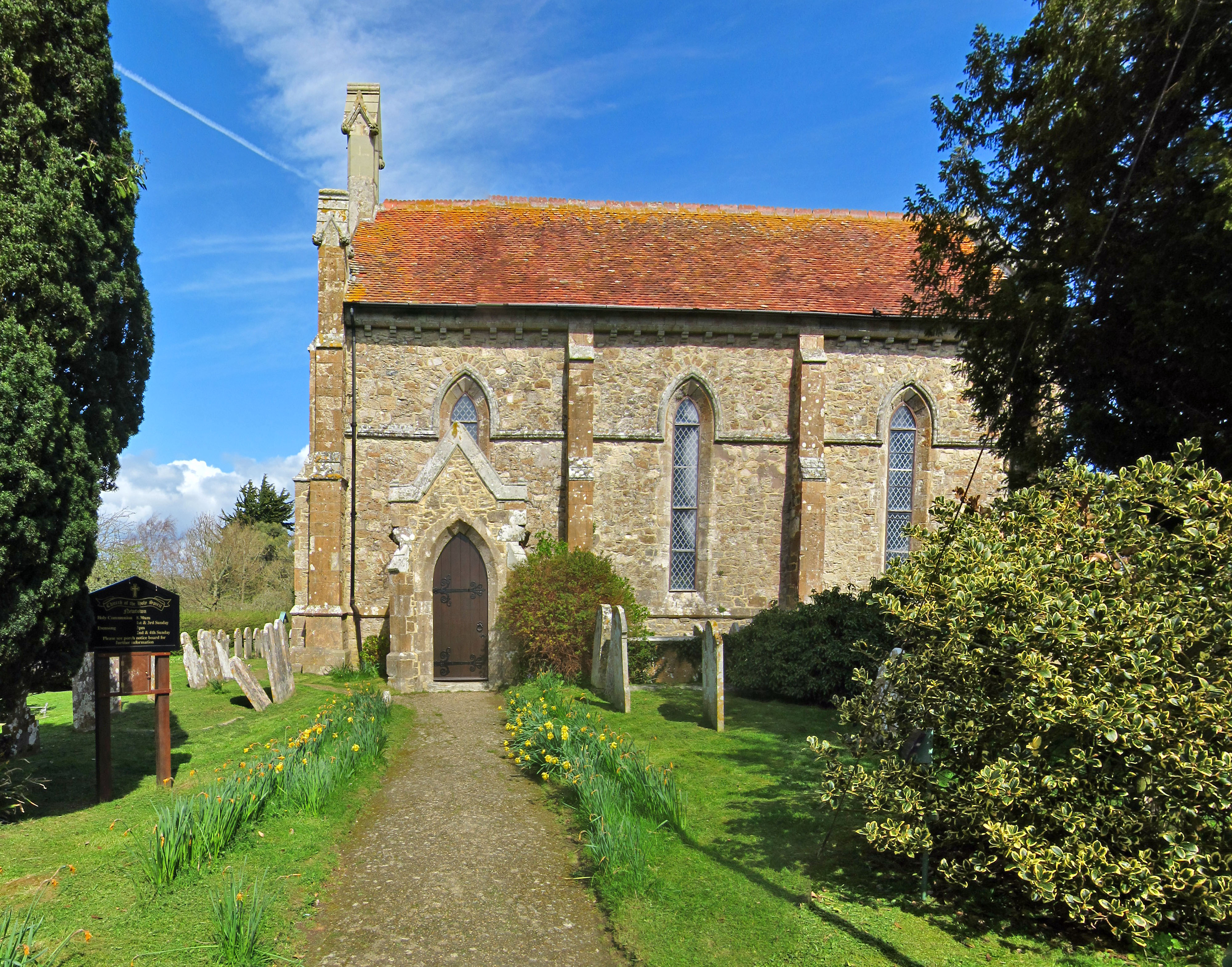
- Holy Spirit Church, Newtown
- 50°42′52″N 01°24′12″W
- Denomination: Church of England
- Churchmanship: Broad Church

History
- Dedication: Holy Spirit

Administration
- Province: Canterbury
- Diocese: Portsmouth
- Parish: Newtown, Isle of Wight

Holy Spirit Church, Newtown is a parish church in the Church of England located in Newtown, Isle of Wight.

== History ==
The church dates from 1835 by the architect A. F. Livesay, and was built on the site of a ruined medieval chapel. Architectural historian Nikolaus Pevsner described the church as 'the finest early nineteenth century church on the Island'.

== Church status ==
The church is grouped with All Saints' Church, Calbourne.
