= Swainston Manor =

Manor house on the Isle of Wight

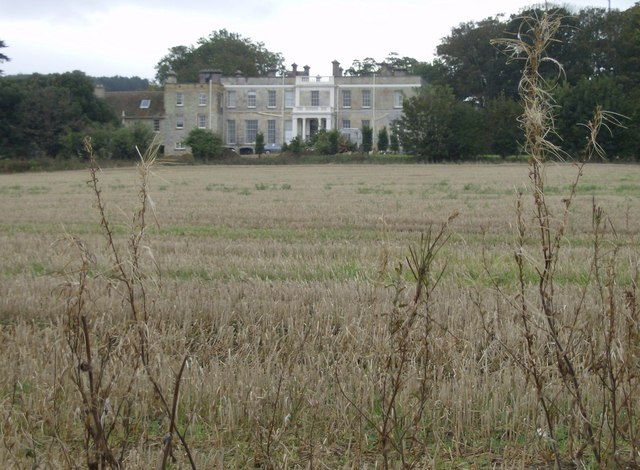
- Swainston Manor Hotel

- Location on the Isle of Wight

General information
- Location: Isle of Wight, England, UK
- Coordinates: 50.688°N 1.377°W
- OS grid: SZ441878

Swainston Manor is an English country house, lying 1 mile (1.6 km) to the east of Calbourne, Isle of Wight, England. It is now a hotel.

== History ==
Swainston Manor was originally a manor house on a site dating back to 735 CE. Eight centuries ago, it became the location of a palace built by the Bishops of Winchester. It has a 12th-century chapel on its 32 acres (13 ha). Most of the present building was constructed in the 18th century, but an attached hall dates from the 13th century. Warwick the Kingmaker reportedly dined at Swainston Manor. It is a Grade II* listed building.

Swainston is derived from its original name, "Sweyn's Town". It was founded by king Sweyn Forkbeard of Denmark, whose son was King Canute. The parish of Calbourne was at one time dependent on Swainston Manor.

The poet Alfred Lord Tennyson also visited Swainston a few times. It is claimed that he wrote "Maud" on its grounds. He also wrote "In the Garden at Swainston" after the death of his friend and Swainston's owner, Sir John Simeon. The house was severely damaged by incendiary bombs during World War II. The church on the site, however, was untouched. Swainstone was one of the locations for the King James School during the 1960s. Other locations for the school included Newport and Cowes.

== In literature ==
Swainston features, as "Swaynestone", in Maxwell Gray's 1886 novel The Silence of Dean Maitland.

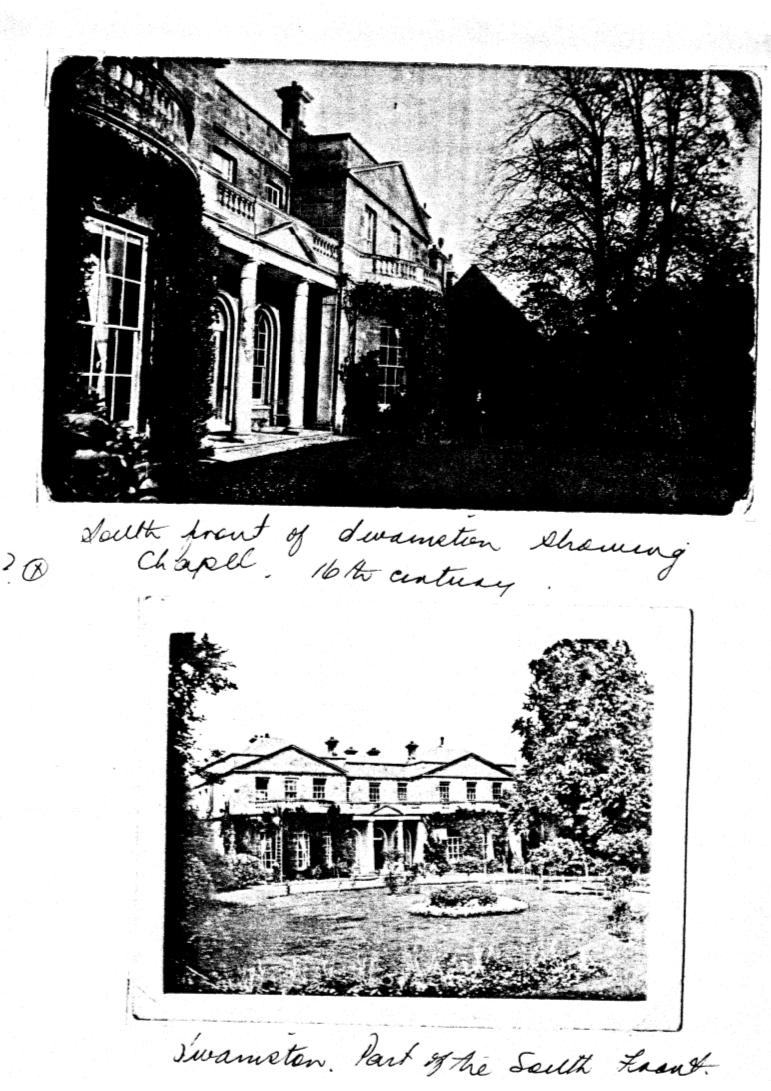
Gardens at Swainston 1909

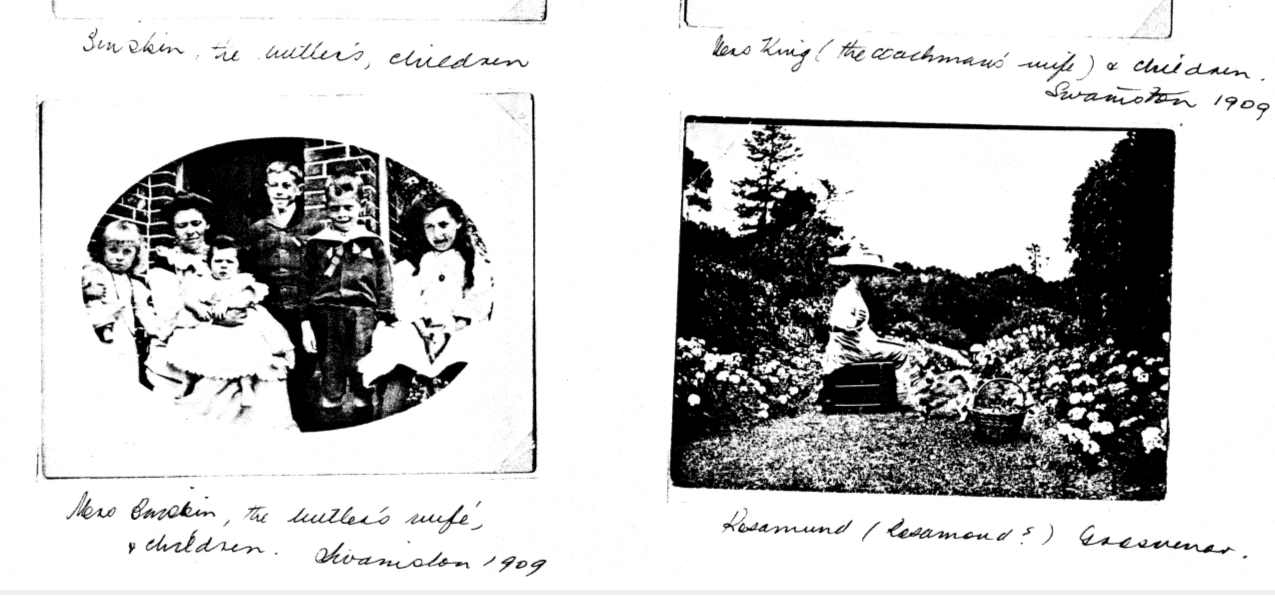
Gardens at Swainston 1909

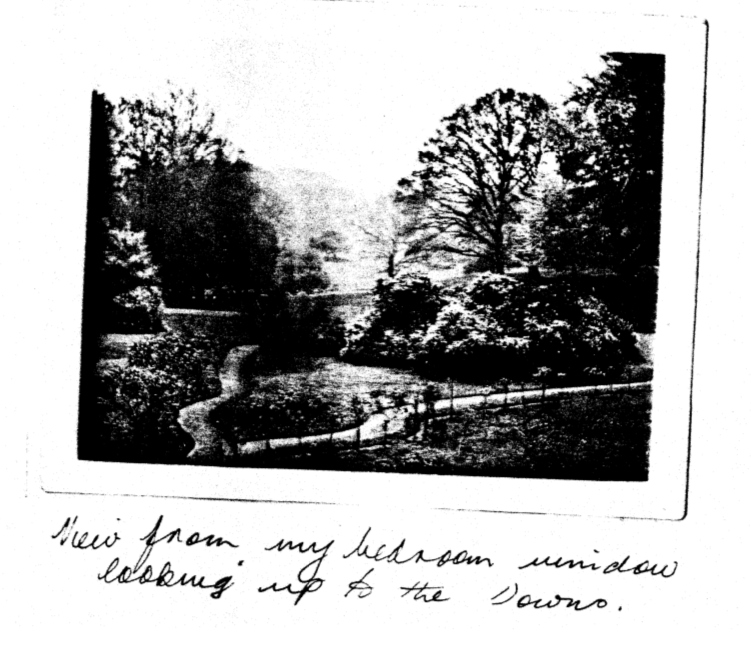
Gardens at Swainston 1909

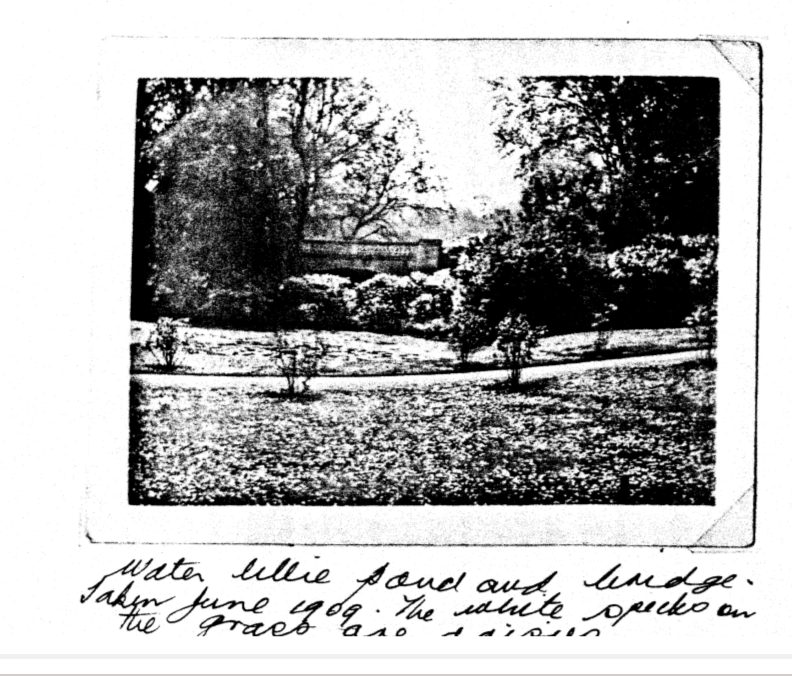
Gardens at Swainston 1909

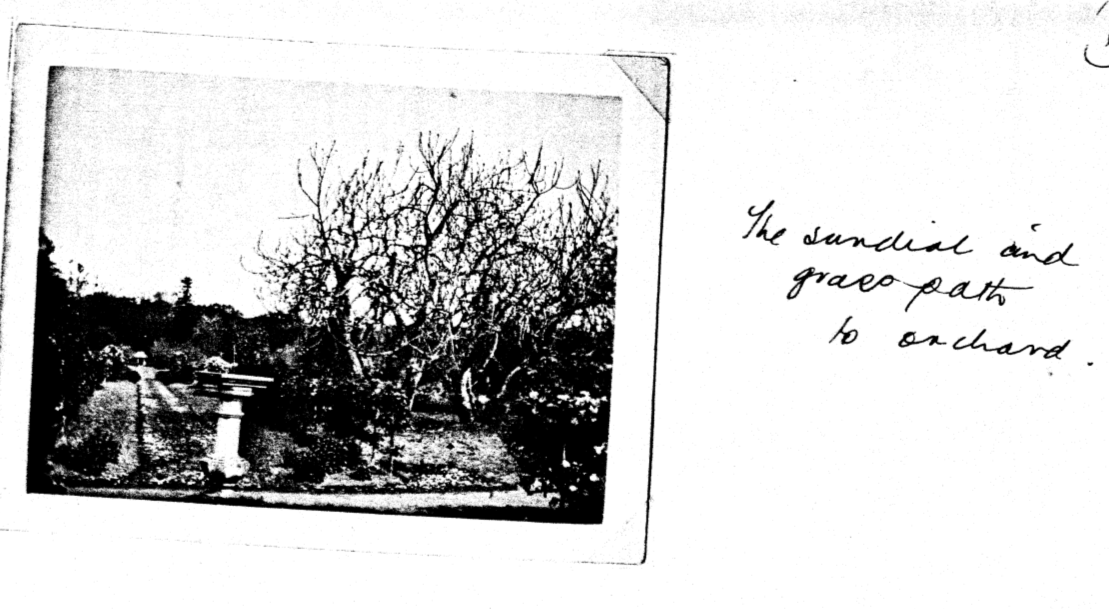
Gardens at Swainston 1909

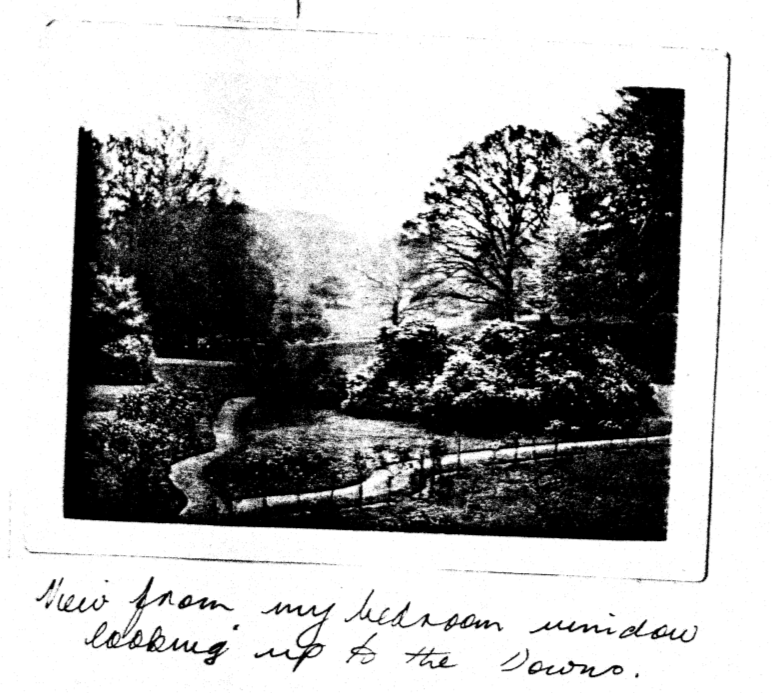
Gardens at Swainston 1909

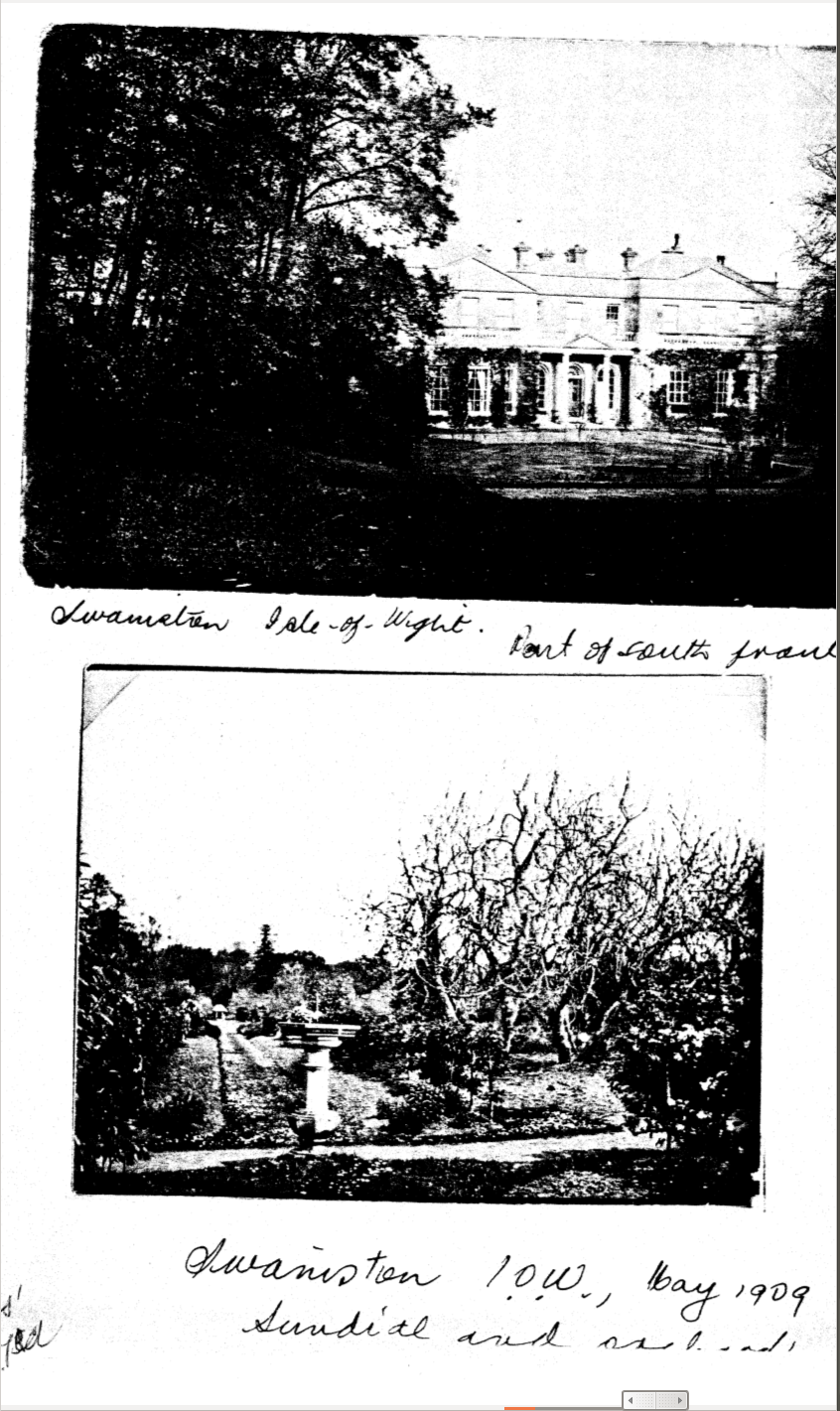
Gardens at Swainston 1909

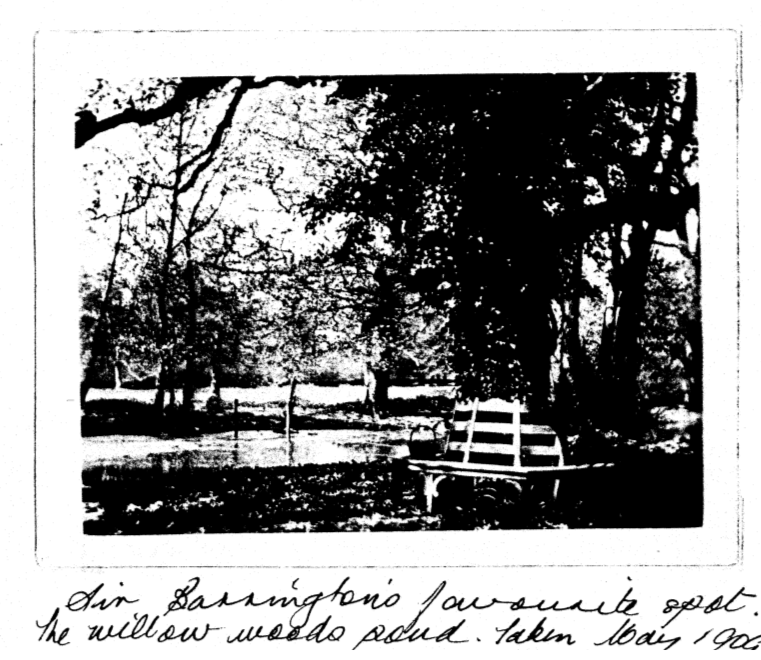
Gardens at Swainston 1909

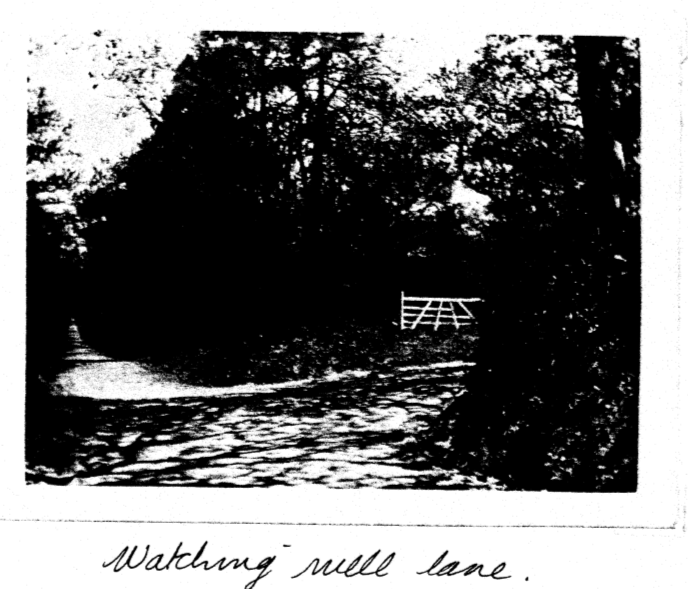
Gardens at Swainston 1909

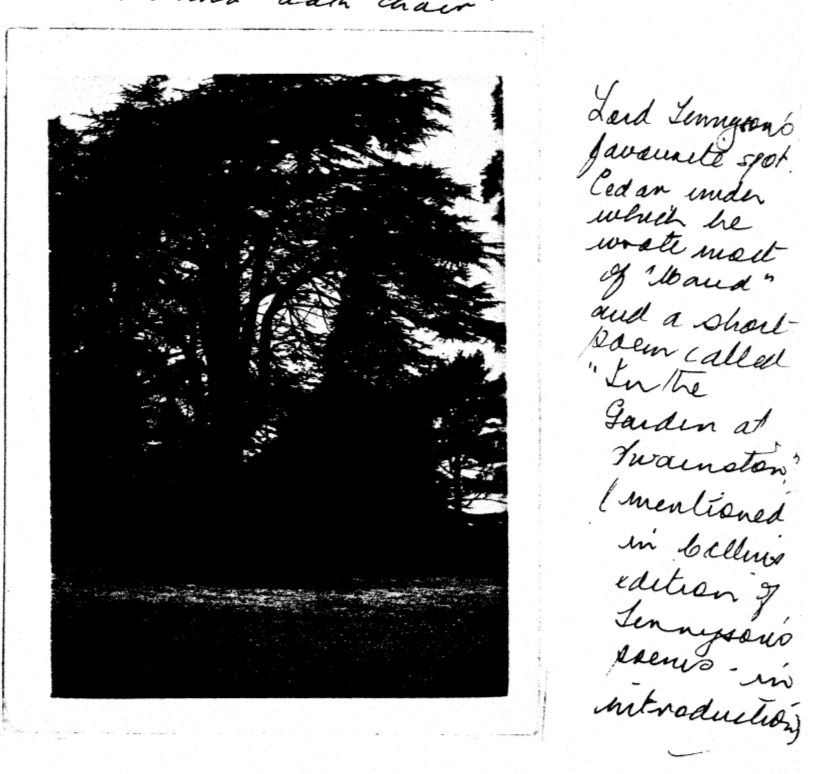
Gardens at Swainston 1909

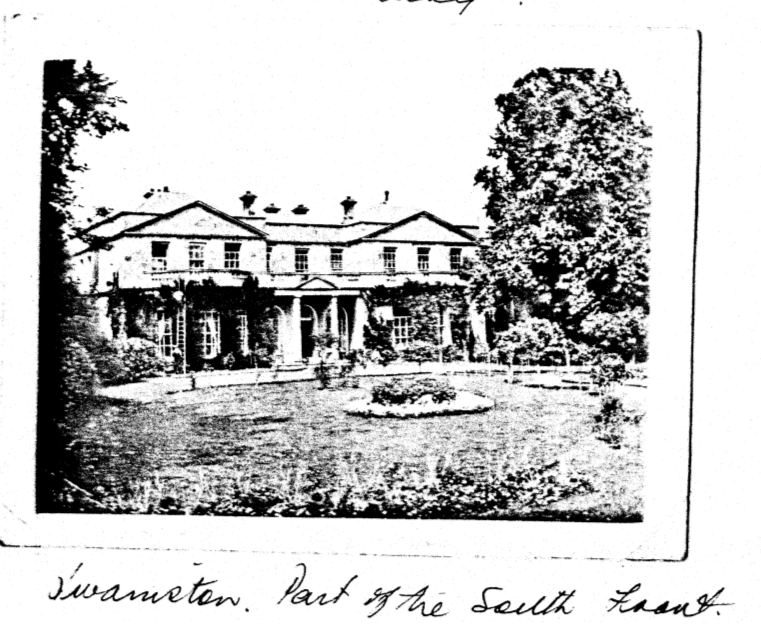
Gardens at Swainston 1909

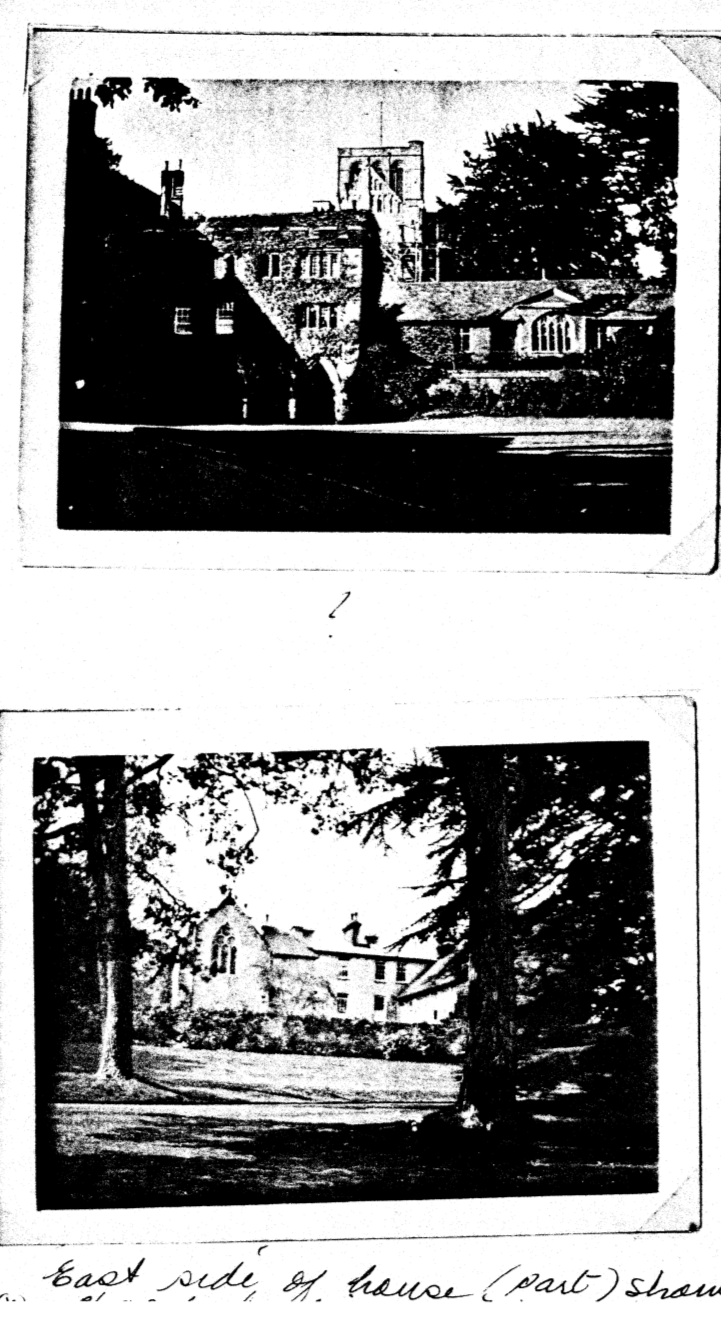
Gardens at Swainston 1909
