= Chessell (surname) =

Chessell is a surname. Notable people with the surname include:

- Duncan Chessell (born 1970), Australian geologist
- Mandy Chessell (born c. 1965), English computer scientist
- Sammy Chessell (1921–1996), English footballer
