= Porchfield =

Village on the Isle of Wight, England

Coordinates: 50°43′08″N 1°22′10″W

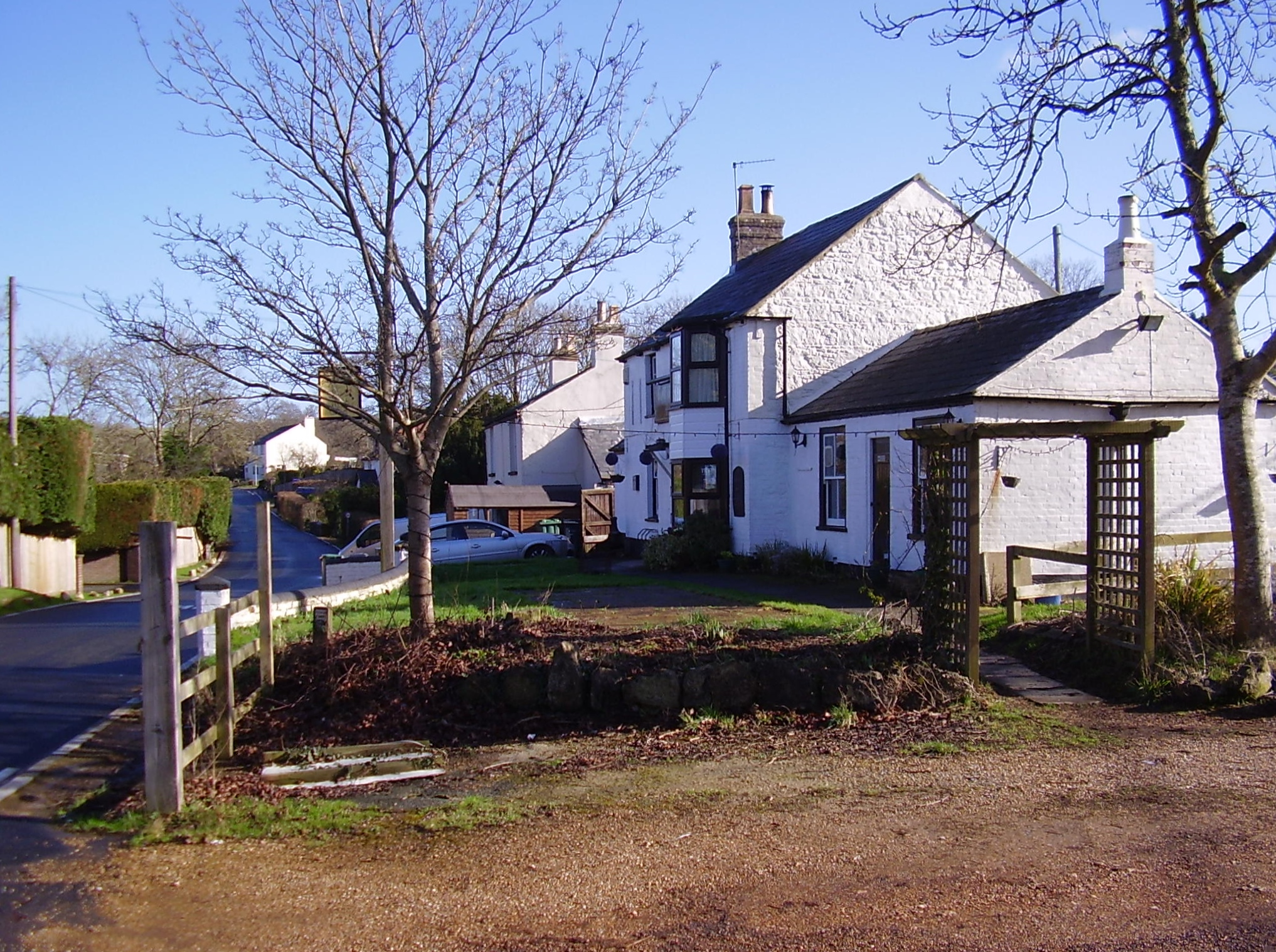
- Main Road, Porchfield

- Location within the Isle of Wight
- OS grid reference: SZ446912
- Civil parish: Calbourne, Newtown and Porchfield
- Unitary authority: Isle of Wight
- Ceremonial county: Isle of Wight
- Region: South East
- Country: England
- Sovereign state: United Kingdom
- Post town: NEWPORT
- Postcode district: PO30 4LP
- Police: Hampshire and Isle of Wight
- Fire: Hampshire and Isle of Wight
- Ambulance: Isle of Wight
- UK Parliament: Isle of Wight West

Porchfield is a village in the civil parish of Calbourne, Newtown and Porchfield, on the Isle of Wight between Cowes and Yarmouth. It is located 4 1/4 miles (6.8 km) southwest of Cowes in the northwest of the island.

== Name ==
The name means 'fields belonging to the Port family', from a local surname mentioned in 13th and 14th century records.

== Amenities ==
Porchfield has a village hall - see external link below - and the nearest church is the Church of the Holy Spirit, in Newtown. There are two bed and breakfasts in Porchfield, "Youngwoods Farm" and "The Ridings". There is a World War I and World War II war memorial in the village.
