= Great Thorness =

Hamlet on the Isle of Wight, England

Coordinates: 50.731085°N 1.361370°W

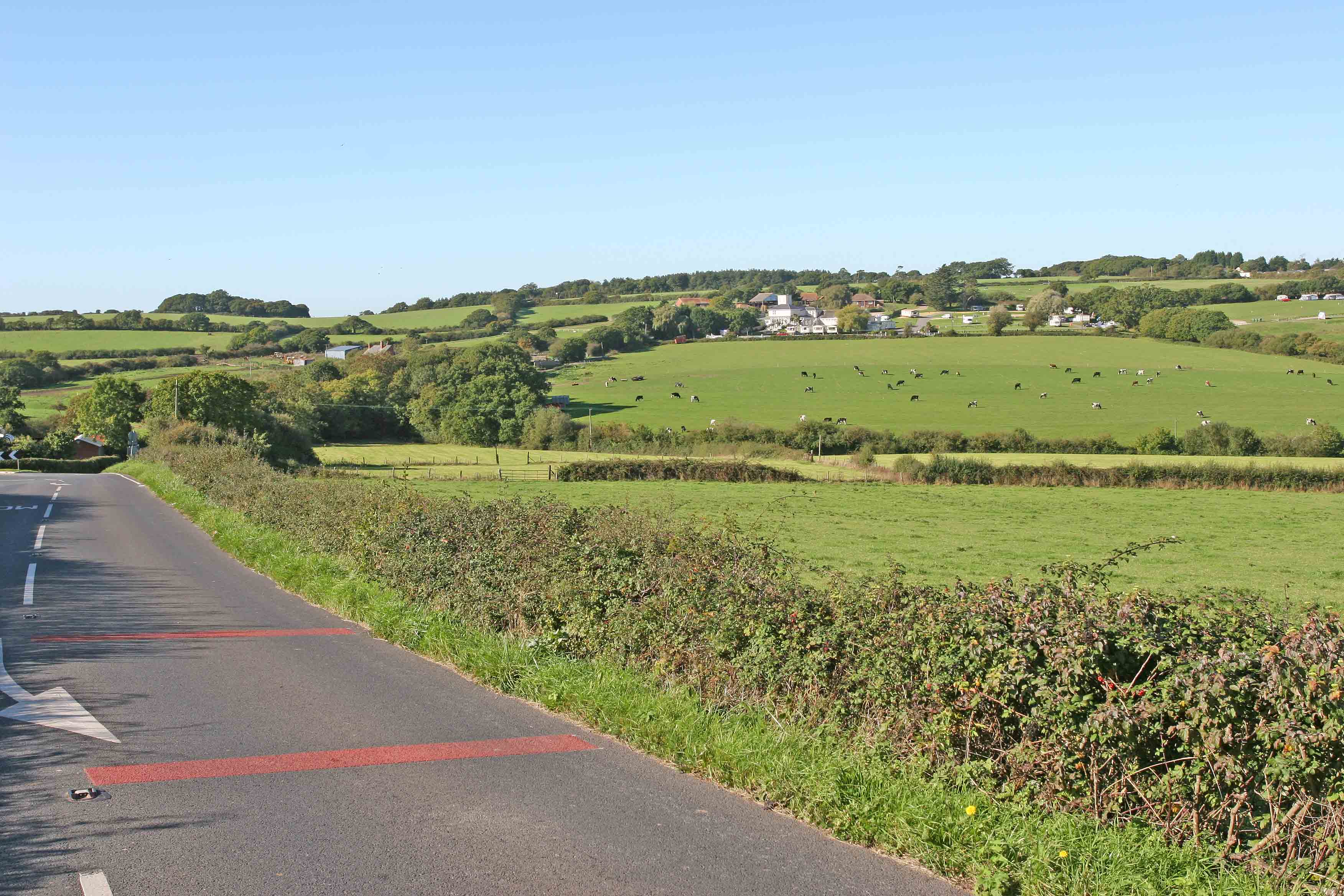
- Great Thorness

- Location within the Isle of Wight
- OS grid reference: SZ452925
- Civil parish: Calbourne, Newtown and Porchfield
- Unitary authority: Isle of Wight
- Ceremonial county: Isle of Wight
- Region: South East
- Country: England
- Sovereign state: United Kingdom
- Post town: NEWPORT
- Postcode district: PO30
- Dialling code: 01983
- Police: Hampshire and Isle of Wight
- Fire: Hampshire and Isle of Wight
- Ambulance: Isle of Wight
- UK Parliament: Isle of Wight West

Great Thorness is a settlement in the civil parish of Calbourne, Newtown and Porchfield, on the Isle of Wight, off the south coast of England.

The hamlet lies near the north-west coast of the island and Thorness Bay. Great Thorness is approximately 4 miles (6.4 km) north-west of Newport.
