= Calbourne =

Village on the Isle of Wight, England

Coordinates: 50.677739°N 1.400175°W

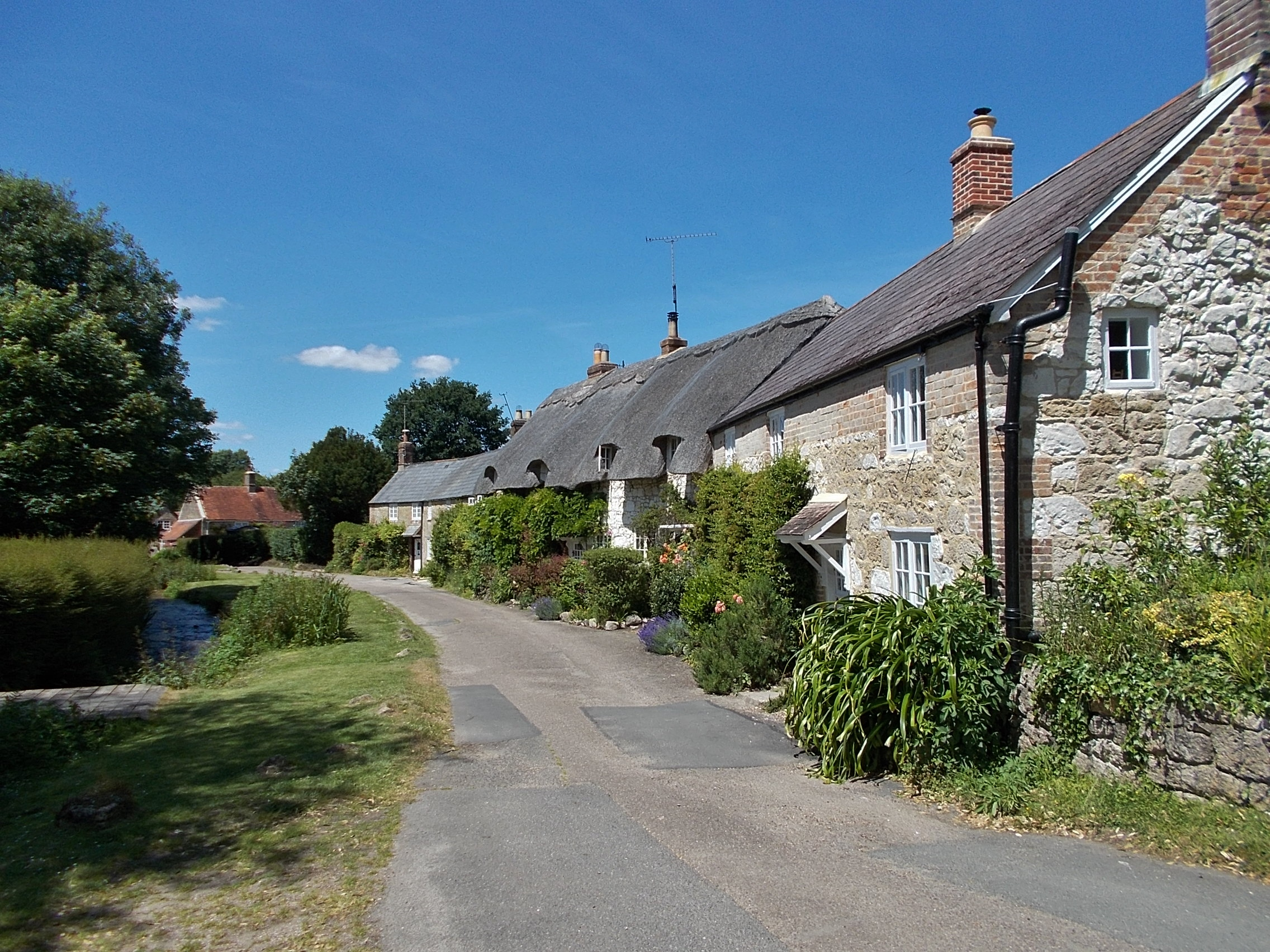
- Winkle Street, Calbourne

- Location within the Isle of Wight
- Area: 31.4800 km^{2} (12.1545 sq mi)
- Population: 886 (2011 Census including Newtown, Five Houses, Porchfield, Locksgreen, Little Whitehouse, Great Thorness and Little Thorness)
  - Density: 28/km^{2} (73/sq mi)
- OS grid reference: SZ4286
- Civil parish: Calbourne, Newtown and Porchfield
- Unitary authority: Isle of Wight
- Ceremonial county: Isle of Wight
- Region: South East
- Country: England
- Sovereign state: United Kingdom
- Post town: NEWPORT
- Postcode district: PO30
- Dialling code: 01983
- Police: Hampshire and Isle of Wight
- Fire: Hampshire and Isle of Wight
- Ambulance: Isle of Wight
- UK Parliament: Isle of Wight West

Calbourne is a village in the civil parish of Calbourne, Newtown and Porchfield, on the Isle of Wight, England. It is located 5 miles (8 km) from Newport in the west of the island.

The village has a post office, a garage, a church and a public house, The Sun Inn. The garage is on the previous site of a blacksmith and wagonmaker. Calbourne is also the home of Westover cricket team, who play on the village green.

== Name ==
Its name is taken from the river Caul Bourne, that the village was built around, probably meaning 'the stream where cole or cabbage grows', referring to sea-kale or sea-cabbage, from Old English cawel and burna. The first element could be an ancient Celtic river-name Cawel, with unknown, but the same origin as the river Cale (earlier Cawel) in Somerset.

826 (in a 12th century copy of a Saxon charter): Cawelburnan

1086 (Domesday Book): Cavborne

1181: Cauelburn

1232: Calburna

1247: Caulburne

== History ==
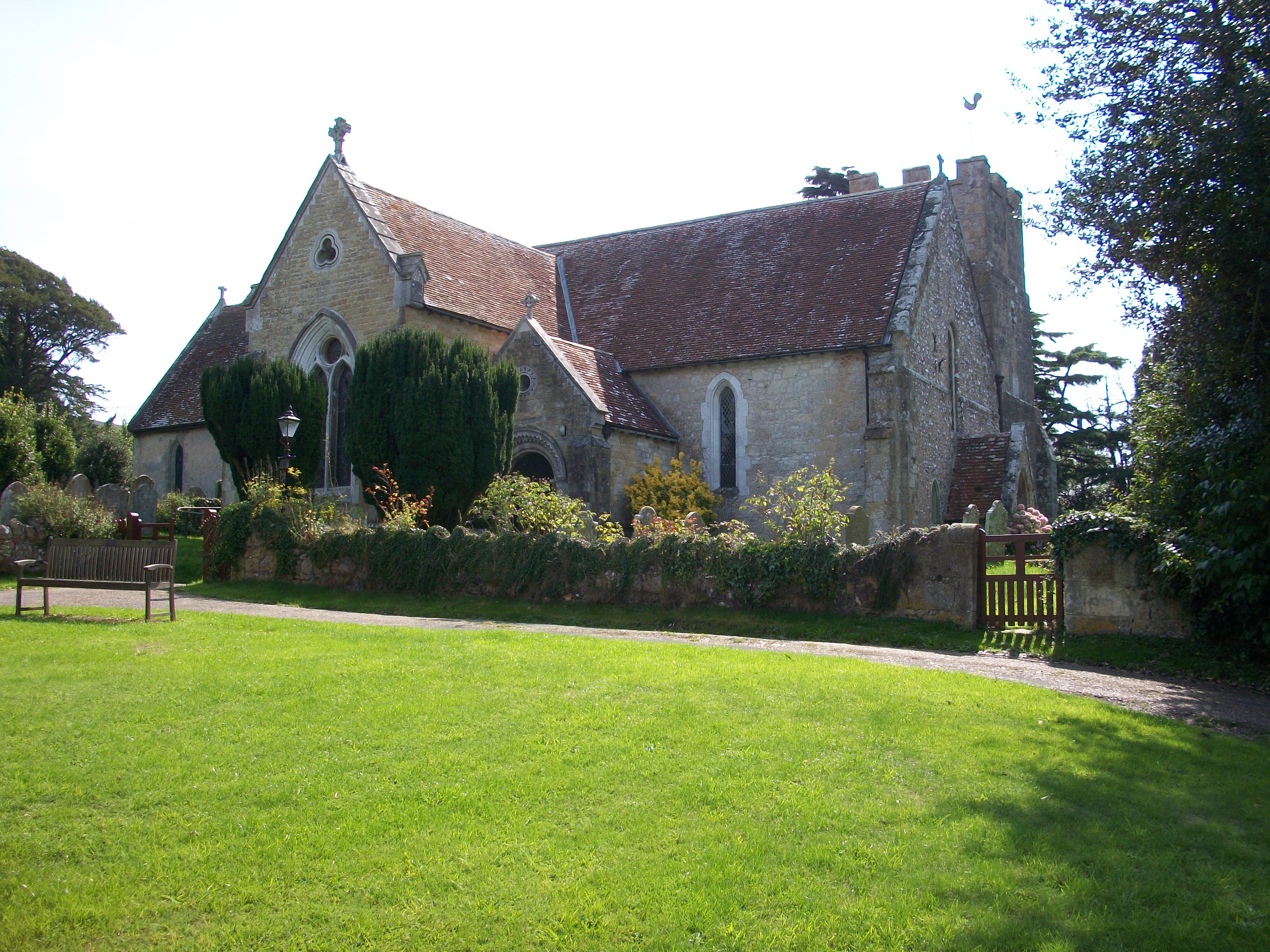
All Saints' Church

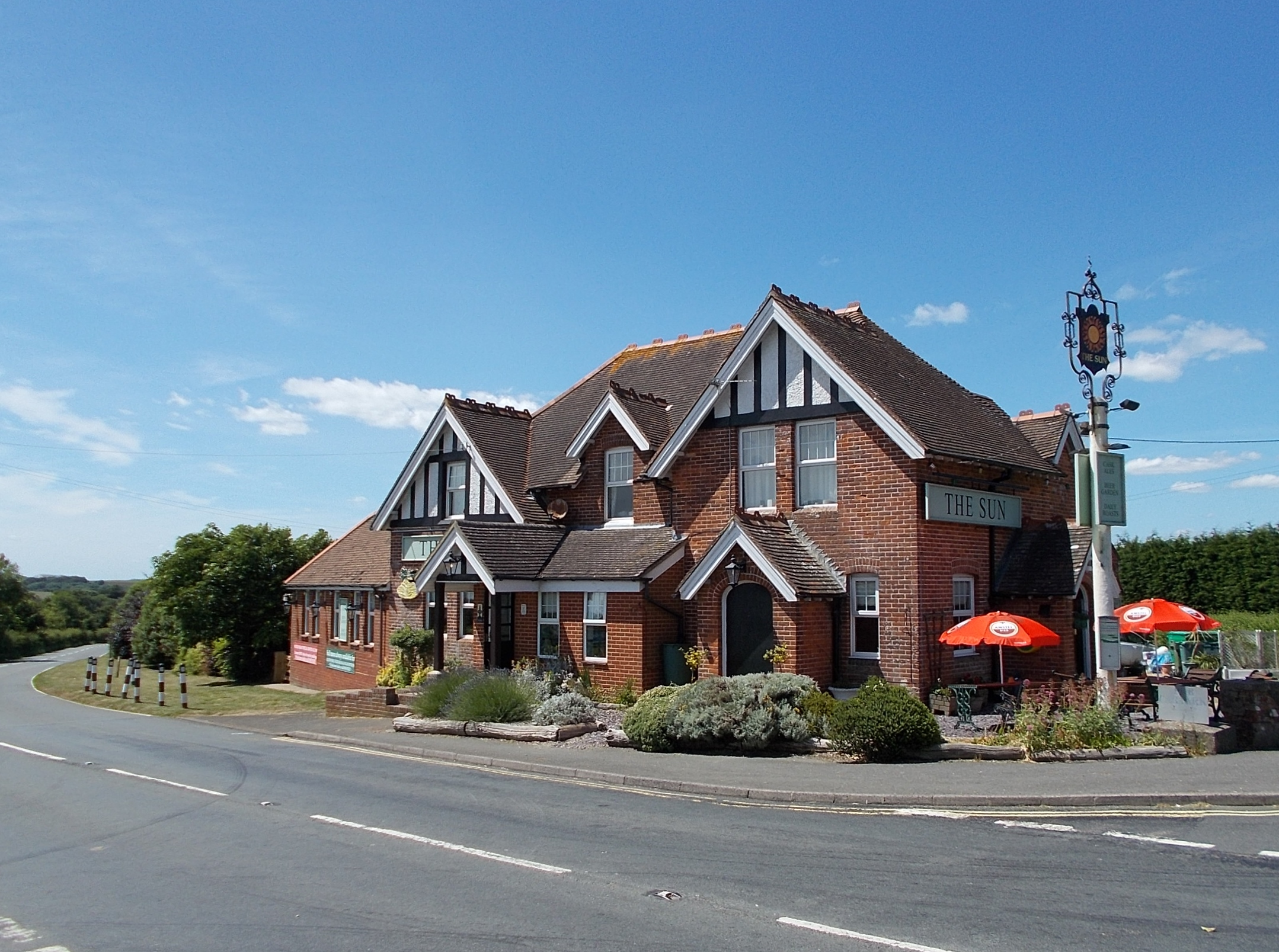
The Sun Inn

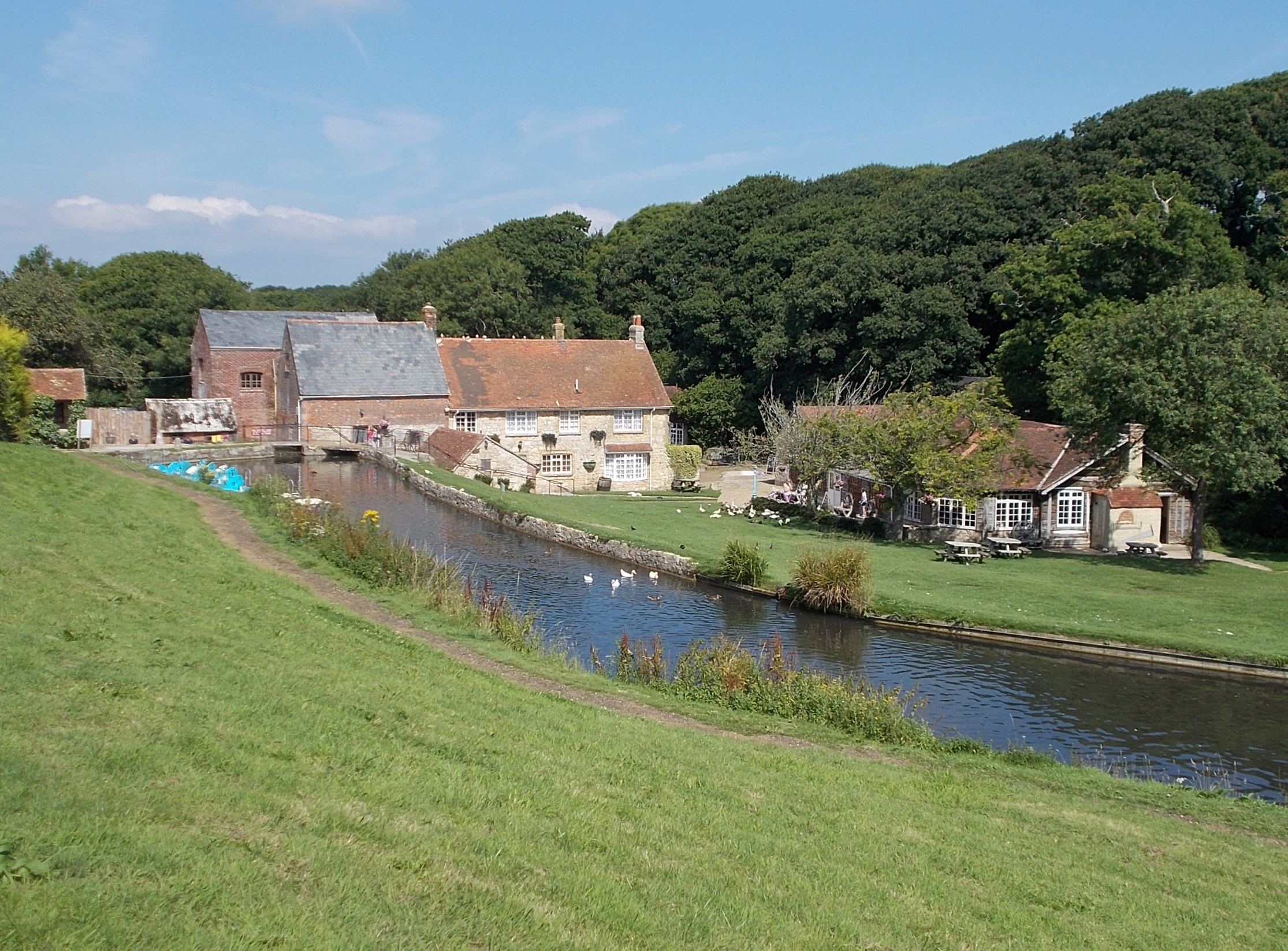
Calbourne Water Mill, now a tourist attraction

There is a privately held manor house, Westover House, on a hill overlooking Calbourne. The Westover Estate was established during the reign of Edward the Confessor. Westover House was once owned by Colonel Moulton-Barrett. Colonel Mouton-Barrett was a relative of the poet Elizabeth Barrett.

Calbourne is also close to the site of Swainston Manor, which is a mile to the east of Calbourne. Now a hotel, Swainston Manor was originally a manor house on a site dating back to 735 CE. Eight hundred years ago it became the location of a palace built by the Bishops of Winchester. It has a 12th-century chapel on its 32 acres (130,000 m^{2}). Most of the present building was constructed in the 18th century, but an attached hall dates from the 13th century. Warwick the Kingmaker reportedly dined at Swainston Manor.

Calbourne is the location of Winkle Street, a picturesque row of cottages which frequently appears on photographs and postcards of the Isle of Wight. Winkle Street looks out on the village stream. Winkle Street was originally named Barrington Row, presumably after longtime residents of Swainston, the Barrington family.

All Saints' Church, in the centre of Calbourne, was established in 826. It features a brass portrait of an armoured knight with hands folded in prayer, resting his feet on a dog. The pictured knight is thought to be William Montacure who was Earl of Salisbury and a governor of the island in the 14th century. Legend has it that Montacure was killed when he was jousting with his father. The heartbroken father created altar tombs in every church in every village in which he owned land or houses.

John Buckler, a British artist and architect, was born in Calbourne.

== Today ==
It is linked to other parts of the Island by Southern Vectis and Community buses Yarmouth and Newport.

A fictionalised Calbourne, as "Malbourne", is the central location of Maxwell Gray's 1886 novel The Silence of Dean Maitland.

== Chale articles ==
- W24 Calbourne
- Swainston Manor
