= Redway Manor =

Country manor house in a parish

Redway Manor is a manor house on the Isle of Wight, situated in the parish of Arreton.

A member of Arreton Manor, it lies to the south of Perreton Manor, between it and the Budbridge and Hale moors. It was devised by Thomas Lord Colepeper to his natural daughter Charlotte, who married Robert Pushall towards the close of the 17th century. After being variously owned, it was bought in 1898 by Mr. Samuel Peters and as of 1912 was occupied by his son Mr. J. C. Peters. The house, a building very similar to Perreton, has lately been remodelled, gables added on the south and a porch to the north front. It lies to the north of the railway about midway between Merston and Horringford, commanding a fine view of the valley.
