= Perreton Manor =

Perreton Manor (also Peryton, 16th century) is a manor house on the Isle of Wight, situated in the parish of Arreton.

A member of Arreton Manor, it belonged at the Dissolution to the Quarr Abbey. A messuage called Perreton was granted in 1545 to Anthony Beyff, and in 1591–2 it was granted to John Welles. It comprises the land between Arreton and Redway, and a field to the west of the road leading from Croucher's Cross to Arreton is called Old Perreton and pointed out as the traditional site of the house. The present house lies in the low ground and is of the ordinary farm type of the 17th century. It has a date stone, L.B. 1668, the initials of Levinus Bennet.
