= Staplehurst Manor =

Historical country manor house in a parish

Staplehurst Manor (also Staplers) was a manor house on the Isle of Wight, situated in the parish of Arreton.

It comprises the high ground to the north-west of Newport, and probably at one time included the land called Blacklands. It was parcel of the manor of Arreton, with which it was granted to Quarr, and is entered as a grange of that monastery in the survey of church lands in 1536. Its later history is identical with that of Arreton Manor.
