= Sillem =

Sillem may refer to:

In people

- Charles Sillem Lidderdale
- Aelred Sillem
- Henrik Sillem

In places

- Sillem Island, Nunavut, Canada

In other uses

- Sillem's rosefinch
