= Horringford =

Coordinates: 50.664887°N 1.237214°W

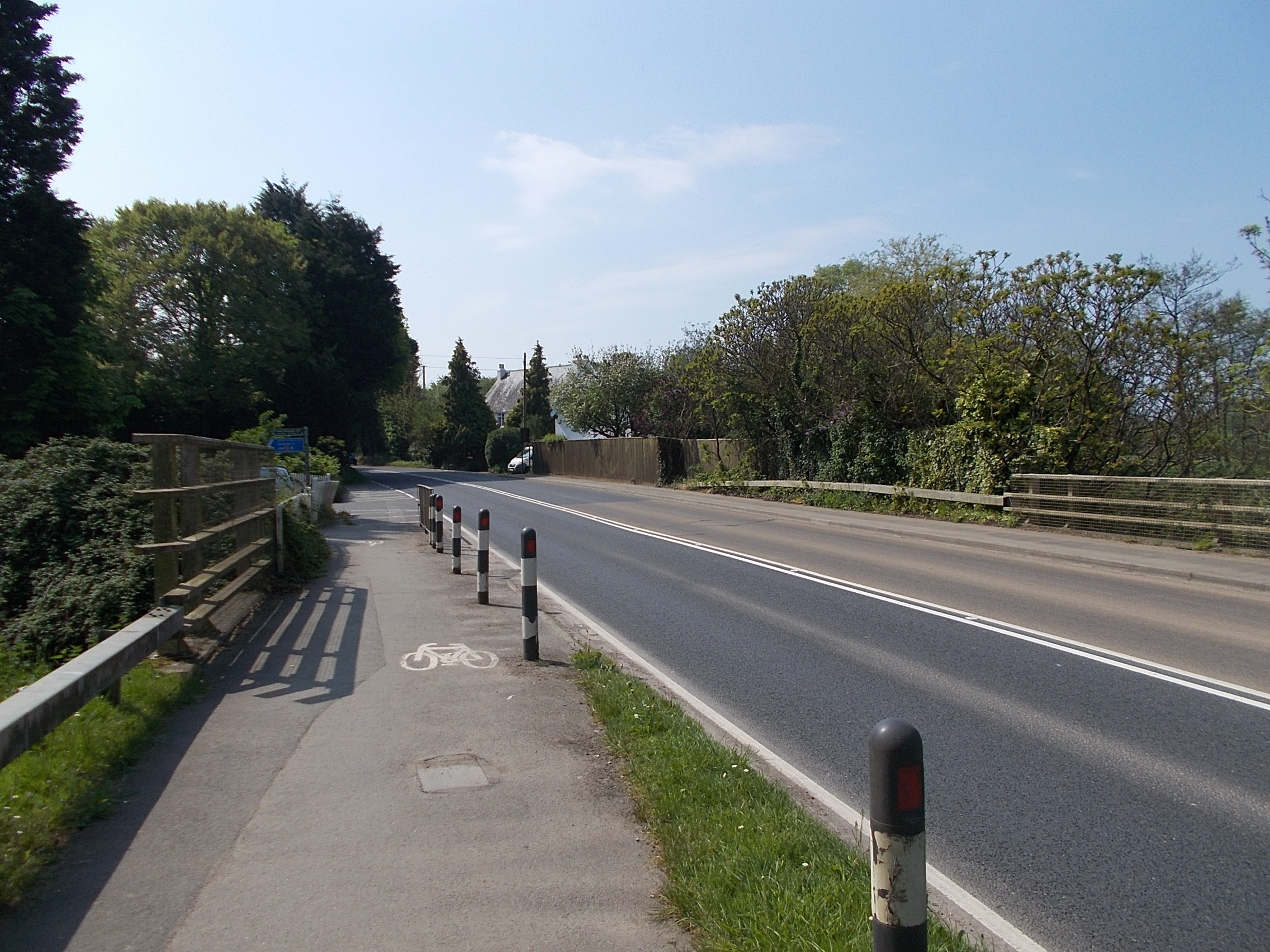

- Location within the Isle of Wight
- OS grid reference: SZ543853
- Unitary authority: Isle of Wight
- Ceremonial county: Isle of Wight
- Region: South East
- Country: England
- Sovereign state: United Kingdom
- Post town: NEWPORT
- Postcode district: PO30
- Dialling code: 01983
- Police: Hampshire and Isle of Wight
- Fire: Hampshire and Isle of Wight
- Ambulance: Isle of Wight
- UK Parliament: Isle of Wight West

Horringford is a settlement on the Isle of Wight, off the south coast of England. It is in the civil parish of Arreton.

The hamlet lies on the A3056 road, near to the larger settlement of Arreton. Horringford is approximately 3.5 miles (5.6 km) south-east of Newport. It contains the Horringford Manor.

== Name ==
The name means 'the ford of the dwellers by the river fork', from Old English horn, -inga-, and ford. Ford is used for the horn-shaped tongue of land between the two streams that meet here, that are tributaries of the Eastern Yar.

1235: Horningeforde

~1240: Horringeford

1255: Horningeford

13th century: Horingeford

1333: Horyngforde
