= Durton Manor =

Durton Manor (also Drodintone, 11th century; Dertune, 13th century; Droditone, 14th century) was a manor house on the Isle of Wight, situated in the parish of Arreton.

Durton, a mile and a half east of Newport, was a manor at the time of Domesday held by Soartin, one of the king's thegns, who had previously held it under King Edward as a freehold. Of this manor William rented two thirds of a hide. Geoffrey Whyteye died in 1309–10 holding 8 acres of land there of Peter Devercy, lord of East Standen, by knight service, and other land of other overlords. He died without heirs and the tenement probably lapsed to the various overlords.
