= Batty Dolls' House =

Dollhouse created by Thomas Batty

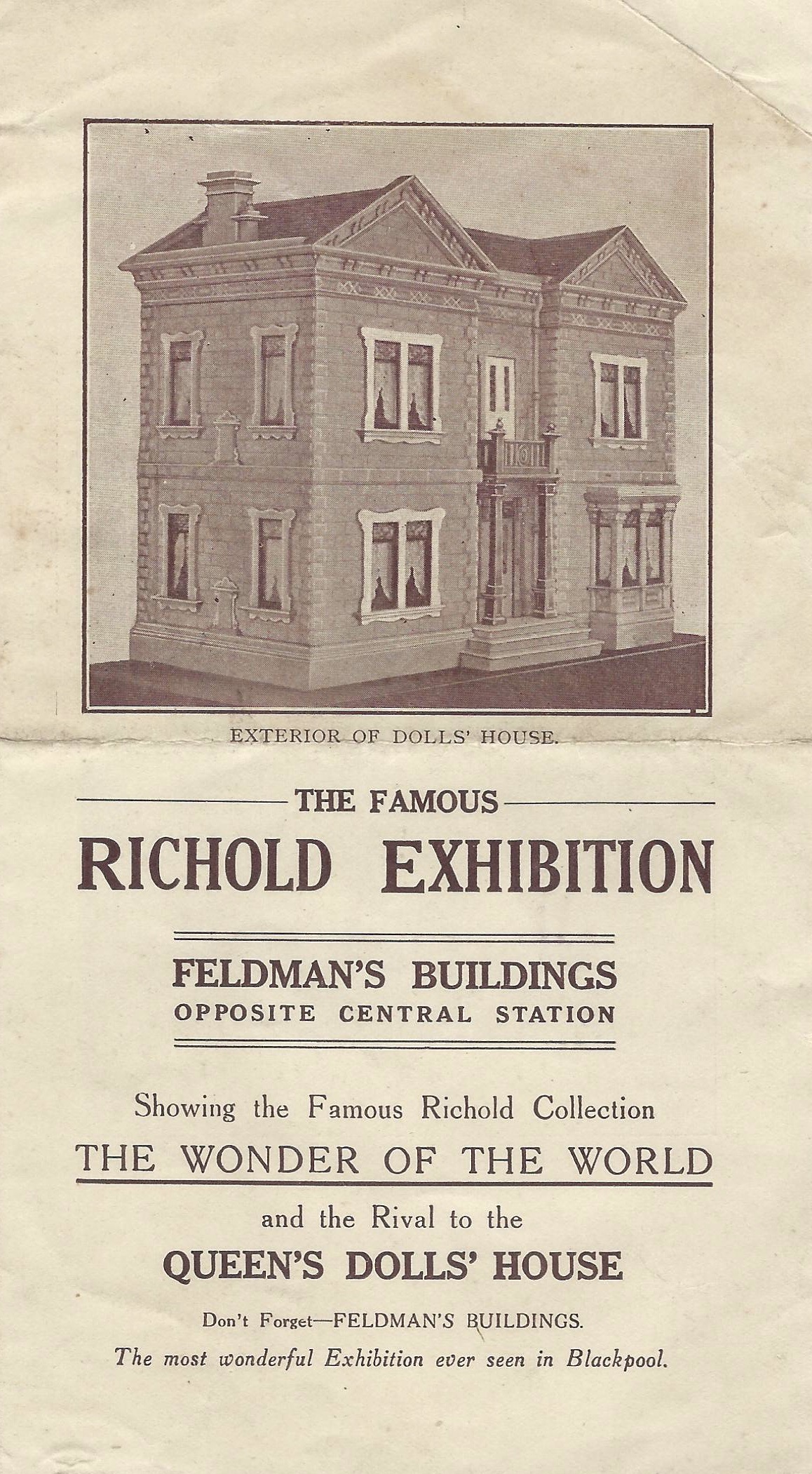
The Batty Dolls' House depicted on a promotional leaflet from circa 1930.

The Batty Dolls' House was a dolls' house of exceptional quality and craftsmanship, created by Thomas Batty of Drighlington, Bradford, West Yorkshire, over a period of more than twenty years from 1908.

The dolls' house and its entire contents were the sole work of Thomas Batty.

Upon completion in about 1928, the Batty Dolls' House was exhibited around the UK, for many years appearing alongside the Richold Collection.

In 1970 the dolls' house went to Arreton Manor on the Isle of Wight where it was on display until sold at auction in 1984 for £6,800.

Since the 1984 auction, the Batty Dolls' House does not appear to have been exhibited in public and details of its present-day whereabouts and owner do not appear to be a matter of public record.

== History ==
=== Pre-World War I ===
Batty made his first dolls' house at the request of a little girl and enjoyed working in miniature so much that he went on to make a dolls' house for his own daughter. At the same time, he conceived the idea of making the "model house, perfect in every detail" which came to be known as the Batty Dolls' House.

Work started on the dolls' house in 1908 and Batty worked on it for over twenty years, initially alongside his work as a painter and decorator and then sometimes for twelve hours a day or more, following his retirement in about 1920. Work on the dolls' house paused during World War I when Batty "laid his hobby aside, having more important work to do". Batty's only son, William Liley, was killed in action during the war on 25 October 1916, at the age of 24.

Batty became a contributor to Queen Mary's Dolls' House when he posted the smallest letter ever sent. The letter was addressed to the Queen Mary's Dolls' House, Wembley where it was on display as part of the British Empire Exhibition, and he received a letter from Queen Mary thanking him for his contribution.

=== Inter-war period ===
The dolls' house was completed some time between 1927 and 1929, by which time Batty was in his early seventies. Some later sources refer to the house as having been completed in 1930, but it was officially opened on 15 of March 1929 by the Duchess of Norfolk at the Shipley Division Unionist Association Empire Bazaar in Saltaire, West Yorkshire. A later source from about 1948 refers to the dolls' house as being opened by "the then Duchess of Devonshire", however, the contemporaneous newspaper article cited refers to the Duchess of Norfolk.

In 1929 the dolls' house was valued at £2,000 and in February 1930 it was on display alongside the 'Famous Richold Collection' of models at an exhibition organised by the Sheffield Daily Telegraph to raise funds for the Poor Children's Holiday Fund.

The dolls' house originally held a miniature autograph book which contained the signatures of "many famous people", however, by 1931 this had been stolen from the dolls' house whilst on display. It is reported that the autograph book contained "over 200 titled signatures", with one such example being Sir William Davies, Editor of The Western Mail.

The dolls' house was then loaned to the Richold Collection, which by 1931 was owned jointly by "Mr. W. H. Todd, a native of Leeds, and Mr. H. Bell of Sheffield". Batty was paid a percentage of the monies earned from exhibiting his dolls' house alongside the Richold models. This arrangement continued for some time until the dolls' house was eventually given to the owner of the Richold collection by a relative of Batty.

Batty died on 24 March 1933.

=== World War II ===
The dolls' house continued to be exhibited extensively alongside the Richold Collection at venues around England and Wales from 1930 up until the beginning of World War II. W. H. Todd managed the Richold Collection, travelling around with it and setting up the models at each venue. He also provided talks on the collection. The creator of the Richold collection, Richard Old, died on 13 November 1932.

The Richold Collection and the Batty Dolls' house may have had something of a base in the seaside resort of Brighton, East Sussex, because in 1931, Todd and his family moved from Scarborough to Woodingdean, Brighton where, according his daughter, Mrs. Una Wilson (née Todd), her "father ran an exhibition of architectural models at the Royal Pavilion," and a later newspaper article refers to "the new owners of the dolls' house" having "had it on display amid the Regency splendour of Brighton's Royal Pavilion". Additionally, during the war, the dolls' house was stored for safety in a room under Brighton railway station, presumably alongside the Richold Collection. In 1969 the Richold Collection was on display on the West Pier, Brighton.

After WW2 both the Richold Collection and the Batty Dolls' House appear to have been exhibited less frequently, however, in November 1950 they were both on display at the 'Birkenhead and Wallassy Ideal Homes Trades Exhibition'.

=== 1960s ===
By February 1969 the Batty Dolls' house was owned by Todd's daughter, Mrs. Una Wilson, and was on display at Kinch and Lack, an outfitters in Worthing. Wilson lived in nearby Lancing and the dolls' house was being used to raise money for Worthing and district Animal Rescue Service, of which Wilson was a committee member. At the same time, Wilson was in discussions with the American company which had recently bought London Bridge and was planning to create an English village around the bridge which was being rebuilt in Arizona. The deal fell through, however, because the company also wanted the Richold Collection (then on display on the West Pier, Brighton) which Wilson is reported as saying she had promised to the Middlesbrough Museum. The American company decided that it "wanted all or nothing, and so the whole thing fell through".

The dolls' house was then in store for a few months before it went to Arreton Manor, possibly on loan since there is no reference to its sale, near Newport on the Isle of Wight, to be displayed in the library.

=== 1970s ===
In 1974 the Batty Dolls' House at Arreton was mentioned in a newspaper advert as one of the attractions included in tours of the Isle of Wight. During its time at Arreton Manor, various postcards depicting the Batty Dolls' house were produced.

=== 1980s ===
The dolls' house remained on display at Arreton Manor, until 1984. However, in 1983 the owner of Arreton Manor, Count Slade de Pomeroy, placed the Manor on the market for sale and though it wasn't sold until 1987 this may have been the catalyst for the sale of the Batty Dolls' house which was auctioned at Phillips auctioneers, off New Bond Street, London on 5 December 1984, where it fetched £6,800.

Since the 1984 auction, the Batty Dolls' house does not appear to have been exhibited in public and details of its present-day whereabouts and owner are not a matter of public record.

== Description ==
The dolls' house was made to a scale of 1:8 (one and a half inches to one foot), measured 1.4 m (4.5 ft) tall by over 1.5 m (5 ft) wide, and weighed about 91 kg (200 lb). Its entire contents (other than the china and glass) were entirely the work of Batty, who was a painter and decorator by trade.

The key to the house was a coin which was posted through the letter box in the front door. This caused the doorbell to ring, released a spring which opened the front door, and at the same time lit up the house electrically.

The exterior of the house incorporated "a device of Mr. Batty's own invention whereby the chimneys could be swept without entering the respective rooms. A portion of the exterior wall was constructed separately and could be removed as a unit to enable the chimney-sweep to tackle his job from the outside".

The house had twenty-six hand-painted windows. Six hundred miniature slates were cut separately from children's hand slates for the roof of the house and the entire dolls' house was electrically illuminated. There was a balcony from the landing window, supported by a square pillar on either side of the front door. The ground floor drawing-room to the right-hand side of the house had a box bay window.

The floor of the hallway was made of inlaid marble "of an original and beautiful design", and a "fine double staircase, with electric standards at the base" led up to the landing above.

The ground floor dining room featured a finely built ceiling, oak furniture upholstered in "warm red Morocco leather", a bookcase stocked with miniature books, a sideboard with a "decanter, cigars and little jars of Chivers' jam" on it, a "cosy armchair", small pewter plates on a plate-rack, a "colourful carpet and glowing fire".

The ground floor drawing-room was designed in Louis XIV style with its furniture covered with 22-carat gold leaf. The table was inlaid with mother-of-pearl. There was an "eight octave grand piano, three and three-quarter inches high, with each of its sixty-four white keys separately cut from billiard balls and the black keys from an ebony walking stick. Two Dresden china ornaments were valued in the first half of the 20th century at £50 each, "and three more small vases at several pounds each", "Delicate paintings panelled the walls and baby Cupids among fleecy clouds" ornamented the ceiling.

There were two bedrooms on the first floor. In one bedroom a piece of furniture described as a "bed-cum-radiator-cum-wardrobe-cum-medicine-chest-cum-safe" was made to Batty's own design and the wardrobe, chest, and "secret safe" were all built into the bed head. It was reported that only Batty knew the whereabouts of the "secret safe".

The four carpets in the house took Batty two years to make working on an average of eight hours a day. It was estimated that "in one cross stitch carpet alone the needle must have passed through the canvas two hundred thousand times". There were three pile carpets made from mercerised silk, and one cross-stitch carpet into which Batty's "needle went in 200,000 times".

The floors of both dining, drawing rooms, and two bedrooms were in inlaid parquetry.
