= Bathingbourne =

Hamlet on the Isle of Wight, England

Coordinates: 50°38′54″N 1°13′31″W

- Hamlet
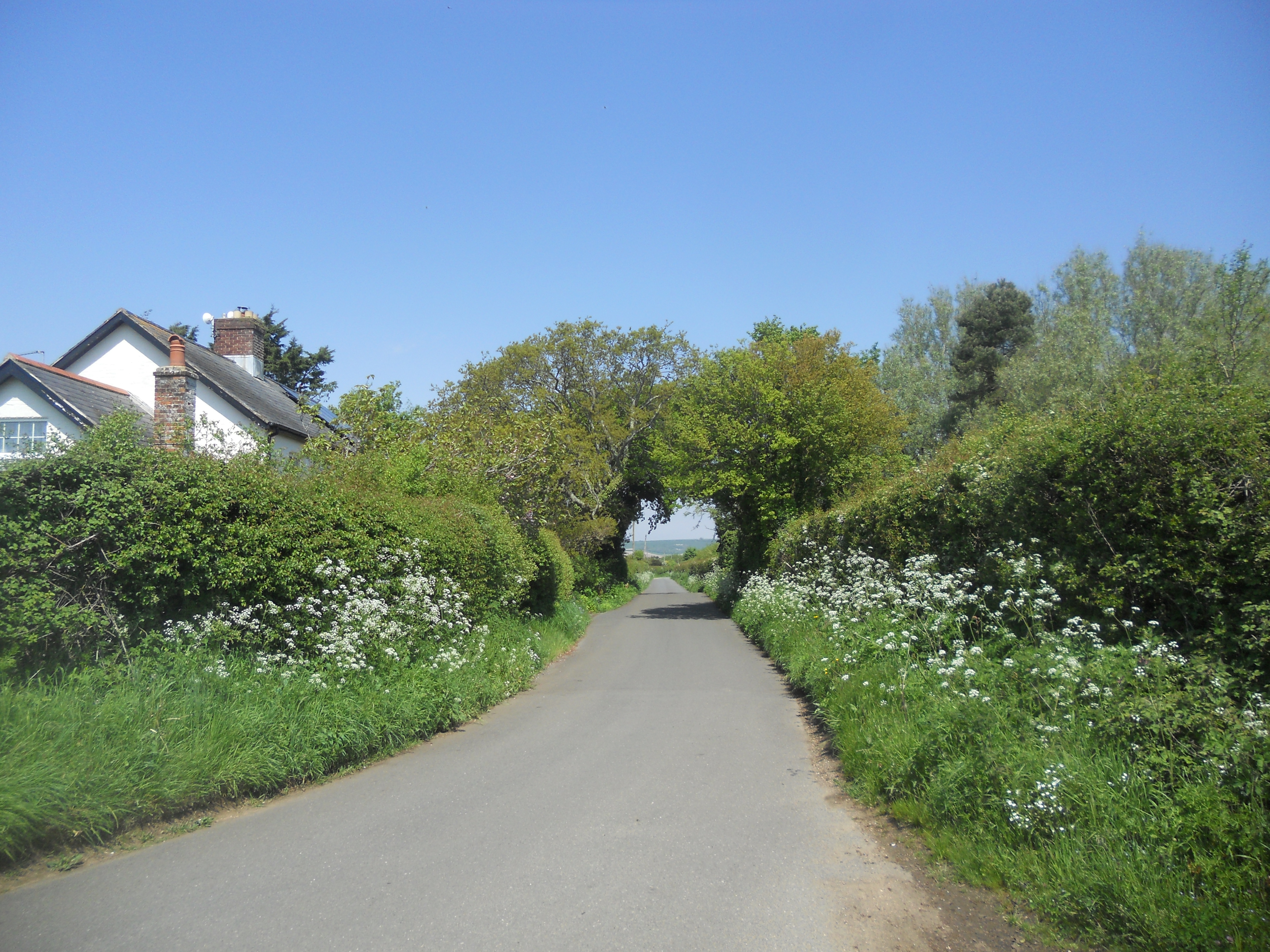
- Bathingbourne Lane
- OS grid reference: SZ5488583575
- Civil parish: Arreton; Newchurch; Godshill
- Unitary authority: Isle of Wight
- Ceremonial county: Isle of Wight
- Region: South East
- Country: England
- Sovereign state: United Kingdom
- Post town: SANDOWN
- Postcode district: PO36
- Police: Hampshire and Isle of Wight
- Fire: Hampshire and Isle of Wight
- Ambulance: Isle of Wight

Bathingbourne is a farming hamlet in the southeastern part of the Isle of Wight. It is located on Bathingbourne Lane, northwest of Apse Heath and southwest of Hale Common. Bathingbourne is on the boundary of Godshill, Arreton and Newchurch civil parishes.

== Name ==
Its name means 'the stream of the family or followers of a man called Beadda', from Old English Beadda (personal name) with -inga- and burna.

~953: Beaddingaburna

1086: Bedingeborne

1235: Baddingeburne

1346: Bathyngbourne

1577: Bangborne

The 1577 spelling reflects the local pronunciation of the name.

== Amenities ==
Several businesses, holiday accommodations and farms are present in Bathingbourne. Bathingbourne farms produce livestock and garlic.

== History ==
Bathingbourne was the name of a manor in the ancient parish of Godshill. It was alternatively known as "Baddingbourne" and "Bangbourne" in the 16th century, but before that it was earlier known as Beaddingaburn (10th century, Bedingeborne (11th century), Baddingebourne (13th century), and Bathyngbourne (14th century). Bathingbourne was one of five manors granted by King Eadwig (reigned 955–959) to members of his thegn, although a previous charter of King Edred (reigned 946–955) also parcelled out this land, but Edred's charter divided the land along different boundaries. The Domesday Book in 1086 listed Bathingbourne in its records of English settlements.

On 16 August 1940, a damaged plane incorrectly identified as a plane manufactured by Dornier Flugzeugwerke, later correctly as a Messerschmitt Bf 109e from Rennes, was struck by a 234 Squadron Supermarine Spitfire and crashed at Bathingbourne Farm. The pilot, Feldwebel Christian Hansen, was taken into police custody, after having a drink at the Fighting Cocks Inn, and driven to Newport. His plane was relatively undamaged, with locals paying to sit in the cockpit. Some mock In Memorium cards were sold, with the text:

In joyful remembrance of the Messerschmitt 109, one of Hitler's Nazi Circus, which finished its aerial career at Bathingbourne Farm on Friday, August 16th, 1940. May its end be followed by many others.
