= Richard Old =

English woodworker and model maker

Richard Old (1854–1932), was an English woodworker and prolific model maker, specialising in fretwork. He was born in Staithes, though for most of his life he lived at 6 Ruby Street in Middlesbrough and it was in that small terraced house that he made all the models - over 750 of them - for which he is celebrated.

A cabinet maker by day, Old would work obsessively through the night on his hobby. Old's wife of just a few years died at the age of twenty-four on 31 March 1889. and although he had been making models since about 1881 this was perhaps the catalyst for it becoming his obsession.

Many of the models were scaled down versions of real buildings and other structures famous for their architecture.

Many of his models formed the Richold Collection - "pronounced RISHOLD" - which of its type was generally regarded as unrivalled by those who viewed it.

Old's work has been displayed at various exhibitions since the 1930s and by the end of 1934 alone the there had been over 100 of these. The collection has since been broken up and sold off. Its star piece was a 1:100 scale model of Milan Cathedral, which was painstakingly recreated over a period of 5 years (a hundredth of the time the real Milan Cathedral took to build).

As well as making his models, Old also found time for many hobbies. He conducted the Cleveland Choral Party "of sixty voices" for eighteen years, including at the Temperance Fete of 100 choirs at Crystal Palace. He was also the choir master and organist of the Baptist Choir, Martin Road, Middlesbrough for six years, and later the choir master of the West End Wesleyan for three years. He was a keen gardener with a particular passion for flowers, having at one time over a hundred different types in his garden. He also had a collection of birds, "all stuffed by himself", birds' eggs, foreign coins and rare grasses.

Late in life, Old made a living from building and restoring church organs. For several years, he was the organist at St John's Church in Middlesbrough.

Richard Old died on 13 November 1932.

Until the 1980s Preston Hall in Stockton-on-Tees housed a number of models from the Richold collection.
