= The Richold Collection =

Collection of architectural models

The Richold Collection was a collection of seven hundred and sixty-seven architectural models, created in wood by Richard Old in the kitchen of the four-room cottage where he lived at 6 Ruby Street, Middlesbrough, North Yorkshire. The models were created over a period of thirty-two years, from about 1881.

Upon completion in about 1913, the Richold Collection was exhibited at various locations around the UK for over thirty years.

The collection was broken up and sold at auction in 1990.

== History ==
Richard Old was born in Staithes, North Yorkshire in about 1854. At about the age of twenty-five and living in Middlesbrough, Old began making models. For the next thirty-two years he continued to create models in the kitchen of his four-room cottage where he lived, at 6 Ruby Street Middlesbrough, until there were a total of 767 models contained in 128 packing cases.

A cabinet maker by day, Old devoted much of his spare time to his hobby, often working through the entire night on a model. Old's wife of just a few years died at the age of twenty-four in 31 March 1889.

Mr W. H. Todd managed the Richold Collection, travelling around with it and setting up the models at each venue. He also provided talks on the collection. The first exhibition was in Scarborough, North Yorkshire.

The Richold Collection had a number of connections to the seaside resort of Brighton, East Sussex: in 1931 Todd and his family moved from Scarborough to Woodingdean, Brighton where, according to his daughter, Una Wilson (née Todd), her “father ran an exhibition of architectural models at the Royal Pavilion,"; and a 1984 newspaper article refers to the owners having had it “on display amid the Regency splendour of Brighton's Royal Pavilion” at an earlier date. Additionally, during WW2 the Batty Dolls' House which toured with and was exhibited alongside the Richold Collection for many years is known to have been stored for safety in a room under Brighton railway station. In 1969 the Richold Collection is known to have been on display on the West Pier, Brighton.

By 1931, the Richold Collection was owned jointly by a Mr. Todd and a "Mr. H. Bell of Sheffield".

Mr. Old died on 13 November 1932.

In November 1950 the Richold Collection was on display at the 'Birkenhead and Wallassy Ideal Homes Trades Exhibition'.

In 1952, the Birmingham Daily Gazette reported that eighteen packing cases containing "the Richold Collection of exhibition fretwork" had been destroyed in a fire in a timber warehouse in Blackwell Street, Kidderminster. The collection was owned by Bertram Coates, the owner of the warehouse, who had purchased it about ten years previously.

The models destroyed by fire in 1952 can have constituted only part of the Richold collection because in February 1969 it was reported that the Richold Collection was in the ownership of W. H. Todd's daughter, Mrs. Una Wilson, who lived in Lancing, West Sussex. At that time, Wilson was in discussions with a view to selling the Batty Bolls’ House to an American company which had recently bought London Bridge and was planning to create an English village around the bridge which was being rebuilt in Arizona. The deal fell through, however, because the company in question also wanted to purchase the Richold Collection (on display on the West Pier, Brighton at that time) which Wilson is reported as having promised to the "Middlesbrough Museum". The American company decided that it "wanted all or nothing, and so the whole thing fell through".

The Collection, by this time numbering "around 70 works", including the model of Milan Cathedral, was auctioned by Sothebey's, Summers Palace, Billingshurst, 6 March 1990. As well as architectural scale models of numerous buildings and monuments there were "cake baskets, cabinets, fans and birdcages" as well as "scale models of a train, tramcar and crane".

== Description ==
In 1934 the Richold Collection comprised over six hundred articles, including:

=== Milan Cathedral ===
Made to a scale of 1:100, this model of Milan Cathedral was made from over 8,000 pieces of woodland took over five years to make. It is made entirely of white holly in emulation of the white marble from which the actual cathedral in Milan is built.

Newsreel footage of Mr. Todd talking about the Milan Cathedral model was made by British Pathé. Mr. Todd is not named as the presenter in the footage, however, his own account of being given the role rather unexpectedly when the model was taken to Pathé's studios in London is on record.

=== Ulm Cathedral ===
Made to a scale of 1:60, the model was 9 feet high and 8 feet long by 3 feet wide. It was made of eight different woods - Amarinth, white maple, white holly, white chestnut, satin walnut, sycamore, lacewood, and black walnut. It took four and a half years to make.

=== Chartreuse Monastery ===
Made to a scale of 1:50. The model contained over 4,000 pieces and took over four years to make. It is made of sycamore with window bows of cotton wood.

=== St. Paul's Cathedral ===
Made to a scale of 1 in 150 with over 400 pieces of sycamore, red myrtle, and white holly. There was also a smaller model in the collection, made to a scale of 1:200 and made in orange wood, mahogany, and lime tree.

=== The Large Alter of St. Peter's Cathedral, Rome ===
This model was 7 foot high and took two and a half year to make. It was made in bird's eye maple and white chestnut.

=== Old State Carriage of France, under the Monarchy ===
Made in satin walnut and white holly to a "small scale".

=== Giotto Campanie, Florence ===
Made to a scale of 1:100 in sycamore.
