= Marie-Gabriel Tissot =

Marie-Gabriel Tissot (1886 - 1983), in 1937 become the first Abbot of Quarr Abbey, England in modern times.

== Biography ==
Tissot was born in France in 1886, and after studies in the seminary of Saint-Sulpice, in 1906 he entered the community of Solesmes Abbey, then living in exile at Appuldurcombe on the Isle of Wight, England. Settling with the rest of the Solesmes community at nearby Quarr in 1908, he was ordained priest there and in 1921 appointed procurator for Solesmes to the Holy See. In these years he also taught patristics at the Benedictine house of studies at Sant’Anselmo on the Aventine.

He rejoined his community at Solesmes in 1925 as novice-master and in 1937 he was appointed Prior. The following year he became the Abbot of Quarr when the house became an independent abbey in its own right. In 1964 he retired and returned to live at Solesmes, where after many years of tranquil life he died suddenly on 21 September 1983. He was to be succeeded as abbot by Dom Aelred Sillem.
