= Quarr Abbey House =

Coordinates: 50.732°N 1.205°W

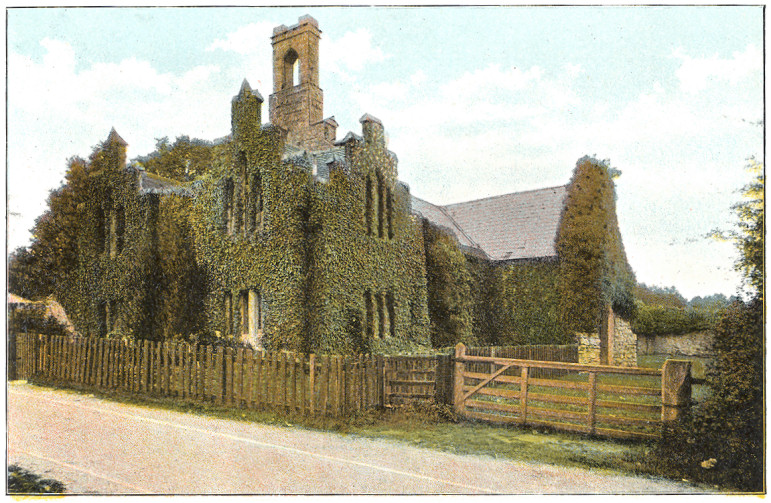
(new) Quarr Abbey House circa 1910 - Original Quarr Abbey House is incorporated in to the new Quarr Abbey

The Quarr Abbey House was one of several houses constructed along the north coast of the Isle of Wight in southern England. Built in the 19th century from the ruins of a Norman abbey, it was a residence of the Cochrane family and was later incorporated into the new Quarr Abbey monastery that was built on the site.

== History ==
The house was built with stone from the ruins of a Norman abbey in the 19th century. It became the home of Sir Thomas John Cochrane in 1859. His daughter Minna was lady-in-waiting to Princess Beatrice, youngest daughter of Queen Victoria. It was at Quarr Abbey House that Princess Beatrice spent her honeymoon after her marriage to Prince Henry of Battenberg on July 23, 1885, at St. Mildred's Church, Whippingham on the Isle of Wight. Henry died ten years later and was buried at St. Mildred's Church, part of which became known as the Battenberg Chapel.

Queen Victoria visited Quarr Abbey House. The Prince of Wales, later Edward VII, and the German Kaiser William II watched the sailing boats from the balcony of the house during the annual Cowes Week Regatta. Only ten days before her death, Queen Victoria recorded in her diary she had enjoyed a duet at Quarr Abbey House played by Minna Cochrane and her daughter Beatrice. After the Queen's death at Osborne House, the Cochrane family and others ceased to frequent the island so often. Quarr Abbey House was left in the hands of a caretaker.

On 24 May 1907 Quarr Abbey House was bought by Benedictine monks who had been leasing the Appuldurcombe House near Wroxall on the Isle of Wight. The house was incorporated into the new Quarr Abbey monastery that was built on the site.

== See also ==
- Quarr Abbey
