= Cuthbert Johnson =

British musician, liturgist and Benedictine abbot

Cuthbert Johnson (11 July 1946 – 16 January 2017) was a British Catholic priest, musician, liturgist and a Benedictine monk. He was the fourth Abbot of Quarr Abbey.

== Life ==
Johnson was born in County Durham, England. After studying with the Christian Brothers and the White Fathers, he entered Quarr Abbey on the Isle of Wight and made monastic profession there on 8 September 1966. He was ordained a priest in 1973.

In 1975 he was sent for further studies at the Pontifical Liturgical Institute in Rome, as a result of which he was awarded a doctorate in Sacred Liturgy. In the years of his studies he also pursued the theory and practice of sacred music, in particular of Gregorian chant, making frequent visits to the Abbey of Solesmes. After several years further service in his monastery, he was called to Rome as an Official of the Congregation for Divine Worship in 1983 and became a section head there in 1994. Upon the sudden death of the then Abbot of Quarr, Dom Leo Avery, Dom Cuthbert was elected to succeed him in August 1996.

After twelve years as abbot, Johnson retired in March 2008. At the time of his retirement he stated,

Quarr Abbey is now ready to pass through a new stage and to enter into a transitional period. After due reflection and prudent counsel the present moment seems an appropriate one in the history of the monastery to provide for new leadership. Therefore, I have decided to retire from the office of Abbot in which it has been my privilege to serve the monastic community of Quarr.

He was appointed a Consultor of the Congregation for Divine Worship and an Advisor to the Vox Clara Committee. He was elected President of the Henry Bradshaw Society in April 2007. Abbot Cuthbert died on 16 January 2017.

== Selected bibliography ==
- 1975: "Prosper Gueranger, Abbot of Solesmes", Clergy Review 60 (1975), p. 95
- 1976: "A Word in Season: A Proposed Patristic Lectionary", Worship 50 (1976), pp. 435–45
- 1981:
  - "Dom Henry Ashworth, O.S.B. (1914–1980) Obituary Notice and Bibliography", Ephemerides Liturgicae 95 (1981), pp. 138–41
  - "British Benedictines and Liturgy", Notitiae 17 (1981), pp. 138–51
- 1982:
  - "On the eve of the publication of Sacrosanctum Concilium", Notitiae 18 (1982), pp. 413–7
  - "A Prophet Igmored", Music and Liturgy 8 (1982), pp. 78–80
  - Cuthbert Johnson & Anthony Ward, "Ou en sont les études sur les liturgies diocésaines de France aux 17e, 18e et 19e siècles?", Ephemerides liturgicae 96 (1982), pp. 265–70
- 1983:
  - Cuthbert Johnson & Stephen Johnson, Planning for Liturgy Liturgical and Practical Guidelines for the Re-Ordering of Churches, St Michael's Abbey Press (1983), p. 123 ISBN 0-907077-22-6
  - Anthony Ward & Cuthbert Johnson, "John Wickham Legg (1843–1921): A Contribution towards the rediscovery of British Liturgical Scholarship", Ephemerides Liturgicae 97 (1983), pp. 70–84
  - "Twenty Years on", Music and Liturgy 9 (1983), pp. 104–12
  - "Prosper Guéranger", Questions Liturgiques 4 (1983), pp. 214–27
  - "Two Abbots and Liturgical Studies: Prosper Guéranger and Fernand Cabrol", Notitiae 19 (1983), pp. 24–9
- 1984:
  - Prosper Guéranger (1805–1875): A Liturgical Theologian, An Introduction to his Liturgical Writings and Work, Pontificio Istituto Sant’Anselmo, Rome, (1984)
  - Cuthbert Johnson & Anthony Ward, "Mediator Dei: The Mandement of the Missal of the Diocese of Evreux 1740", Ephemerides Liturgicae 98 (1984), pp. 416–8
  - "Altar and Ambo: Christ's Presence in Sacrament and Word", Music and Liturgy 10 (1984), pp. 13–6
  - "The Instruction 'Liturgicae Instaurationes': A Commemorative Review, 1970–1985", Notitiae 21 (1984), pp. 723–7
  - Cuthbert Johnson & Anthony Ward, "Mediator Dei: The Mandement of the Missal of the Diocese of Evreux 1740", Ephemerides Liturgicae 98 (1984), pp. 416–8
- 1985:
  - Anthony Ward & Cuthbert Johnson, "A Forgotten Liturgical Scholar: John Wickham Legg", Notitiae 21 (1985), pp. 115–21
  - Cuthbert Johnson & Anthony Ward, "Diary of an Anglican Liturgist in Rome in 1906", Notitiae 22 (1985), pp. 563–5 (in collaboration)
  - Cuthbert Johnson & Anthony Ward, "A Catalogue of Printed Liturgical Books of the Dioceses of France", Questions Liturgiques 66 (1985), pp. 53–8
- 1986:
  - Cuthbert Johnson & Anthony Ward, "Fontes Liturgici: The Sources of the Roman Missal (1975), I. Advent, Christmas", Notitiae 23 (1986), pp. 441–748
  - "Gosling, Samuel", R. Aubert (ed) Dictionnaire d’histoire et de géographie ecclésiastiques, Letouzey et Ané, Paris t. 21 (1986), col. 833
- 1987:
  - Cuthbert Johnson & Anthony Ward, "Some British Societies for the Publication of Studies and Ancient Texts", Ephemerides Liturgicae 101 (1987), pp. 229–45
  - Cuthbert Johnson and Anthony Ward, "The Figure of Mary in the Worship of the Church of England", Marianum 49 (1987), pp. 254–95
  - Cuthbert Johnson & Anthony Ward, "Fontes Liturgici. The Sources of the Roman Missal (1975) II: Prefaces", Notitiae 24 (1987), pp. 408–1010
- 1988:
  - Dom Guéranger et le renouveau liturgique : une introduction son oeuvre liturgique, Téqui, Paris (1988)
  - "Rogate e Liturgia", Studi Rogationisti 21 (1988), pp. 7–33
  - "Decalogue for Prayer", Notitiae 24 (1988), pp. 615–24
  - Cuthbert Johnson & Anthony Ward, "Documentation Concerning the Liturgy during the Pontifical Ministry of Pope Paul VI", Notitiae 24 (1988), pp. 529–42
  - Cuthbert Johnson & Anthony Ward, "Documentation Concerning the Liturgy in the Pontifical Ministry of Pope John Paul II", Notitiae 24 (1988), pp. 777–89
- 1989:
  - Anthony Ward & Cuthbert Johnson, The Prefaces of the Roman Missal: A Source Compendium with Concordance and Indices, Congregation for Divine Worship, Vatican City, (1989)
  - Cuthbert Johnson & Anthony Ward, "Praecelsa Filia Sion: Approaching the Euchological Vocabulary of the Collection Missarum de Beata Maria Virgine", Notitiae 25 (1989), pp. 625–788
  - "Evangelisation and Culture: An African American Catholic Perspective. Rejoice! Conference Seminar Rome 9 16 November 1989", in Notitiae 25 (1989), pp. 623–624
- 1990:
  - Anthony Ward & Cuthbert Johnson, "The Henry Bradshaw Society: Its Birth and First Decade, 1890–1900", Ephemerides Liturgicae 104 (1990), pp. 187–200
  - Cuthbert Johnson & Anthony Ward, "The Liturgical Scholarship of Dom Henry Ashworth (1914–1980)", Ephemerides Liturgicae 104 (1990), pp. 299–338
- 1991:
  - "Dalla Lancia del Soldato alla Devozione al Sacro Cuore", Messagero del Sacro Cuore (giugno 1991), pp. v–xv
- 1992:
  - Cuthbert Johnson & Stephen Johnson, Progetto Liturgico, CLV, Rome (1992)
  - "Prefaces: Shaping a New Translation", Pastoral Music (April–May 1992), pp. 34–7
- 1993:
  - Christian Burial: The Ordo Exsequiarum 1969 with Related Liturgical Texts, Indexes, and Bibliography, CLV, Rome (1993) ISBN 8885918794
  - Missale Parisiense anno 1738 publici iuris factum. Curantibus Cuthbert Johnson, o.s.b. & Anthony Ward, s.m. (1993); ISBN 88-85918-82-4
  - "Variationes: Il Codice di Diritto Canonico e i libri liturgici", A. Moroni, C. Pinto, M. Bartolucci (edd.) Sacramenti, Liturgia, Cause dei Santi: Studi in onore del Cardinale Giuseppe Casoria, Napoli 1992, pp. 481–500
  - "The Education of the Social Conscience in Christian Initiation", Christus Lumen Gentium. Eucharistia et Evangeliatio, Vatican City (1993), pp. 281–9
  - Cuthbert Johnson & Anthony Ward, "The Sources of the Eucharistic Prefaces of the Roman Rite", Ephemerides Liturgicae 107 (1993), pp. 359–83
- 1994:
  - Missale Romanum anno 1962 promulgatum. Reimpressio, introductione aucta curantibus Cuthbert Johnson, o.s.b. & Anthony Ward, s.m., CLV, Rome, (1994) ISBN 88-85918-90-5
  - Cuthbert Johnson & Anthony Ward, "Missale Romanum anno 1975 promulgatum", Orationes et Benedictiones, CLV, Rome, (1994) ISBN 88-85918-81-6
- 1995:
  - "Cuthbert Johnson & Anthony Ward, Orbis Liturgicus: Repertorium Peritorum Nostrae Aetatis in Re Liturgica, Who's Who in Contemporary Liturgical Studies, Repertoire des chercheurs contemporains en etudes liturgiques, CLV Rome (1995) ISBN 88-86655-02-9
  - Le Liber Mozarabicus Sacramentorum et les manuscrits mozarabes. Marius Férotin, o.s.b. Réimpression de l'édition de 1912 et bibliographie générale de la liturgie hispanique, préparées et présentées par Anthony Ward, sm et Cuthbert Johnson, osb., CLV, Rome, (1995)
- 1996:
  - Anthony Ward & Cuthbert Johnson, "The Sources of the Roman Missal (1975)", Notitiae 32 (1996), pp. 7–179
  - Missalis Romani Editio Princeps. Mediolani anno 1474 prelis mandata. Reimpressio Vaticani exemplaris, introductione aliisque elementiis aucta curantibus Anthony Ward, s.m. & Cuthbert Johnson, o.s.b., CLV, Rome, (1996) ISBN 88-86655-09-6 Le Liber Ordinum en usage dans l'Église wisigothique et mozarabe d'Espagne du cinquième au onzième siècle. Marius Férotin, o.s.b. Réimpression de l'édition de 1904 et supplément de bibliographie générale de la liturgie hispanique, préparés et présentés par Anthony Ward, sm et Cuthbert Johnson, osb, CLV, Rome, (1996)
  - Cuthbert Johnson & Anthony Ward, "The Preface: A Bibliography", Ephemerides Liturgicae 110 (1996), pp. 388–97
  - Anthony Ward & Cuthbert Johnson, "Edmund Bishop's The Genius of the Roman Rite: Its Context, Import and Promotion", Ephemerides Liturgicae 110 (1996), pp. 401–41
- 1998:
  - Vetus Missale Romanum Monasticum Lateranense. Anno 1752 a Nicolao Antonelli editum. Reimpressio editionis Romae anno 1752 publici iuris factae, introductione aucta curantibus Anthony Ward, s.m. & Cuthbert Johnson, o.s.b., CLV, Rome (1998) ISBN 88-86655-39-8
  - Martyrologium Romanum. Reimpressio integra textus officialis cum emendationibus et variationibus usque ad Concilium Oecumenicum Vaticanum II convocatum effectis necnon nova introductione aucta curantibus C. Johnson & A. Ward, CLV, Rome (1998)
  - Pontificale Romanum. Reimpressio editionis iuxta typicam anno 1962 publici iuris factae, partibus praecedentis editionis ab illa omissis, introductione et tabulis aucta., curantibus Cuthbert Johnson, o.s.b. & Anthony Ward, s.m., CLV, Rome (1999)
- 2001: Rituale Romanum. Editio prima post typicam anno 1953 promulgata. Reimpressio editionis primae post typicam anno 1953 publici iuris factae, textibus postea approbationis, introductione et tabulis aucta. Curantibus Anthony Ward, s.m. & Cuthbert Johnson, o.s.b., CLV, Rome (2001)
- 2003: Cuthbert Johnson, Liturgie et Archeologie, Deux Fondateurs: Prosper Gueranger, OSB et G.B. De Rossi. Documents inédits, CLV, Rome (2003) ISBN 88-7367-016-4
- 2004: "An Episode in the Struggle for Reform of the Gregorian Chant and for Religious Liberty", Ephemerides Liturgicae 118 (2004), pp. 29–61
- 2005: "Shared Values: Newman, Guéranger and Benedict XVI", Benedict XVI and Cardinal Newman, ed. Peter Jennings, Oxford (2005), pp. 72–5
- 2007:
  - "Guéranger and Study, Pitra and Migne", Ephemerides Liturgicae 121 (2007), pp. 7–24
  - Cuthbert Johnson & Anthony Ward, "The Orations of Lent before the First Sunday in the 2000 Missale Romanum", Ephemerides Liturgicae 121 (2007), pp. 328–69
- 2008:
  - Anthony Ward & Cuthbert Johnson, "The Orations of Lent for the Second Week in the 2000 Missale Romanum", Ephemerides Liturgicae 122 (2008), pp. 78–125
  - Cuthbert Johnson & Anthony Ward, "The Lenten Orations for the Third Week in the 2000 Missale Romanum", Ephemerides Liturgicae 122 (2008), pp. 190–239
  - "The Pastoral Power of the Liturgy: Prosper Guéranger's 'Année Liturgique'", Ephemerides Liturgicae 122 (2008), pp. 240–9
- 2009:
  - Cuthbert Johnson & Anthony Ward, "Sources of the Orations for Holy Week in the 2000 Missale Romanum", Ephemerides Liturgicae 123 (2009), pp. 311–56
- 2011:
  - Understanding the Roman Missal: The New Translation, CTS, London (2011).
  - A Simple Guide to the Mass, CTS, London (2011).
  - Celebrating the Liturgy with Dignity and Beauty, CTS, London (2011).
- 2015
  - Vatican II as I saw it: Letters, Journal, Diary and Papers of Lawrence Leslie McReavy, St Michael's Abbey Press, Farnborough, Hampshire (2015).
- 2016
  - "Guéranger, Prosper", in Luigi Borriello (et alii, edd.), Nuovo Dizionario di Mistica, Libreria Editrice Vaticana, 2016, pp. 1007–1009.
  - Cuthbert Johnson & Anthony Ward, "The First Three Days of Advent: Sources of the Orations in the 2008 Printing of the "'Missale Romanum'", Ephemerides Liturgicae 130 (2016) pp. 157–203.
  - Cuthbert Johnson & Anthony Ward, "Sources of the Advent Orations in the Missal of Paul VI: Week I, Wednesday to Saturday", Ephemerides Liturgicae 130 (2016) pp. 306–344.

Reviews published in Revue d'histoire ecclésiastique and Ephemerides liturgicae (1972–2016)
