= Hale Common =

Hamlet on the Isle of Wight, England

Coordinates: 50°39′16″N 1°13′37″W

Hale Common: Hale
- Hamlet
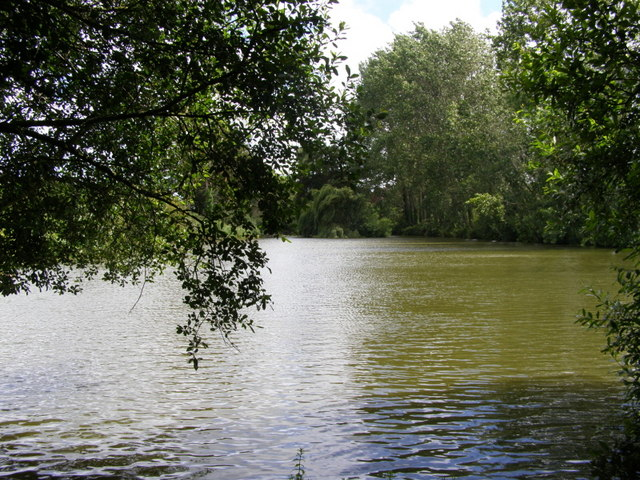
- A fishing lake at Hale Common

- Location within the Isle of Wight
- OS grid reference: SZ5496084312
- Civil parish: Arreton
- Unitary authority: Isle of Wight
- Ceremonial county: Isle of Wight
- Region: South East
- Country: England
- Sovereign state: United Kingdom
- Post town: Sandown
- Postcode district: PO

Hale Common (also known as Hale) is a farming hamlet in the civil parish of Arreton, on the Isle of Wight. Hale Common is on the A3056 road between Lake and Arreton. Hale Common is northeast of Bathingbourne and northwest of Branstone.

== Name ==
The name means '(the place at) the nook or corner of land', from Old English h(e)alh (dative case h(e)ale)

1086 (Domesday Book): Atehalle

~1200: la Hale

1255: Hale

1267: la Haule

1769: Hale (Farm)

In the Domesday Book spelling, ate means 'at the'.

== Overview ==
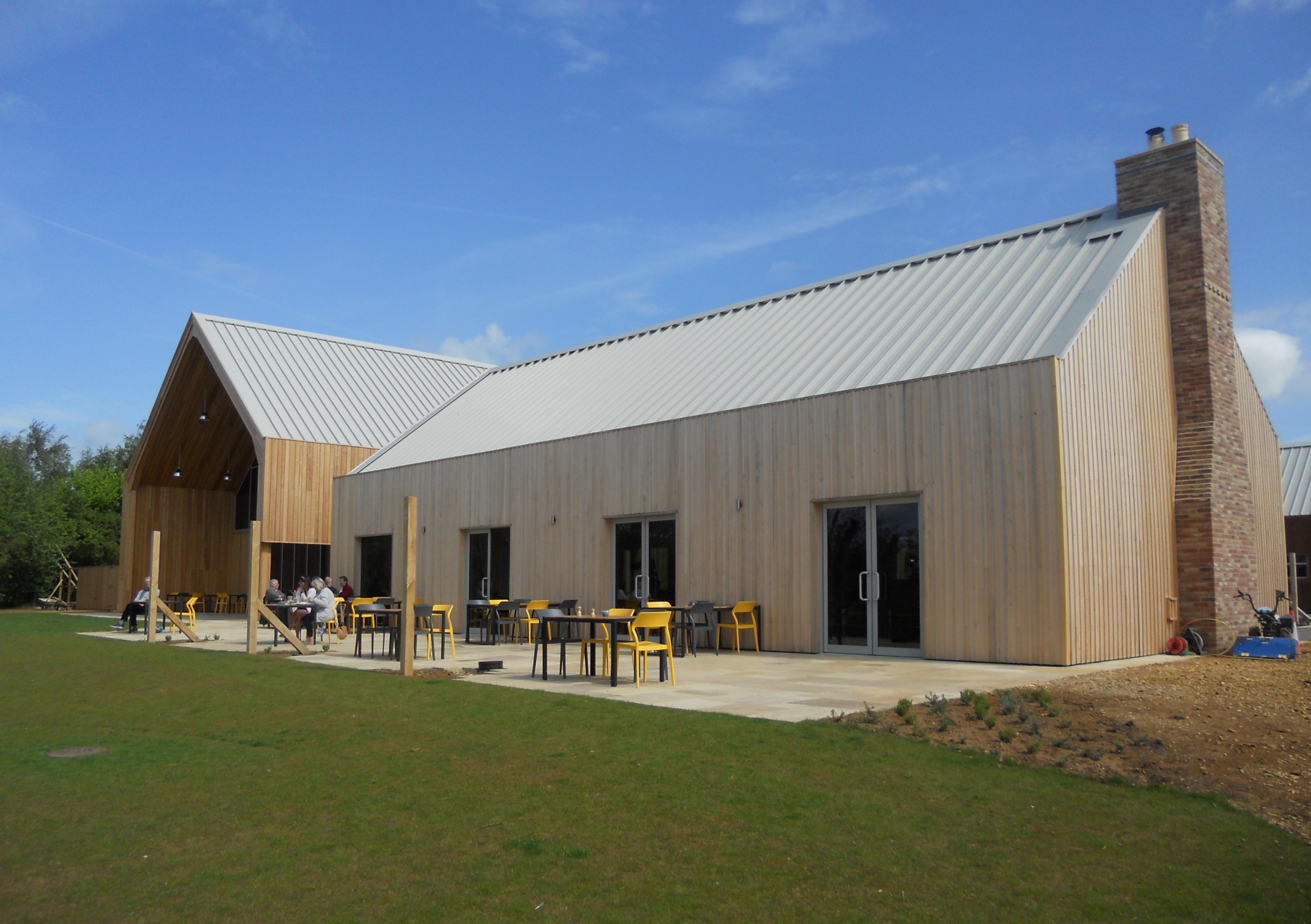
Harvey Brown's farm shop café

Hale Common features "The Fighting Cocks" pub. There is a strawberry farm in Hale Common, called Hollands Strawberry Farm. Hollands Strawberry Farm has a shop, and also allows people to pick their own strawberries.

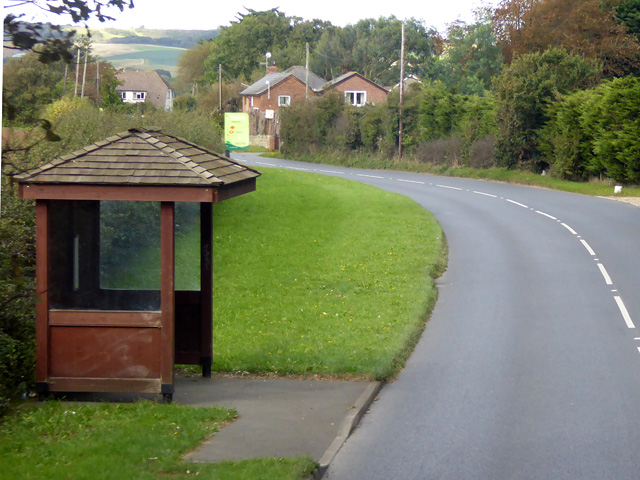
Bus shelter at Hale Common

There are two fishing lakes in Hale Common, called the Hale Manor lakes. One is available for those who purchase a "day ticket" and the other allows fishing by those members of a syndicate. These lakes are the site of a wetland restoration project by the Royal Society for the Protection of Birds.

Hale Common also is the site of a car dealership and service station. There are several other businesses in Hale Manor, including other farms, and engineering, concrete and construction services.
