= Harry Hawles =

Harry Hawles (1386–1430) was a Steward of the Isle of Wight during the reign of Henry V. Hawles was a member of the de Aula family, who held office under Montecute, Earl of Salisbury, Lord of the Island from 1386 to 1397 under grant from Richard II. Hawles fought in the Battle of Agincourt in 1415.

There is a brass effigy of Hawles in St. George's Church in Arreton, Isle of Wight. In the fourteenth century, the brass effigy of Hawles was added to the church's interior. The brass effigy is missing its head and also the coat of arms.

There is a note marking Hawle's resting place that reads:

Here is ybried under this grave
Harry Hawles, his soul god save
Long tyme steward of the yle of wyght
have m'cy on hym, god ful of myght.
