= Leo Avery =

English abbot

Leo Avery (5 January 1938 - 4 July 1996) was third Abbot of Quarr Abbey, on the Isle of Wight, from 1992 to 1996.

== Biography ==
Leo was born 5 January 1938, in Wakefield, Yorkshire, England, and raised in Maidstone, Kent, England. After studies in aeronautical engineering at Southampton University, England, he entered the novitiate at Quarr Abbey, on the nearby Isle of Wight, in September 1960. He made monastic profession on 8 September 1962, and in 1969 was ordained priest. Subsequently he studied for a licentiate in Biblical Studies at the Pontifical Biblical Institute in Rome. After his return he taught Scripture to the monks and served in many other capacities, often of a practical nature that reflected his early training as an engineer.

In 1980 he became prior and upon the retirement of Abbot Aelred Sillem in 1992, Dom Leo was elected to succeed him. He died after a short illness on 4 July 1996. He was succeeded as abbot by Dom Cuthbert Johnson.
