= Aelred Sillem =

English abbot

Aelred Sillem (29 October 1908 – 19 May 1994) was second abbot of Quarr Abbey, on the Isle of Wight, from 1964 to 1992.

Sillem was educated at Haileybury and Magdalen College, Oxford, and received the habit at the Benedictine abbey of St Gregory, Downside, in 1929. He studied theology in Munich in the years 1931–1933 and then in 1934 asked to be transferred to Quarr Abbey, on the Isle of Wight. He was ordained a priest at Quarr's mother abbey, Solesmes, in France, on 22 August 1937. He was Superior of the Solesmes Congregation community at Farnborough in the difficult years of 1941–1947.

Returning to Quarr, he occupied important posts and was appointed Prior in 1951. Upon the retirement of Abbot Marie-Gabriel Tissot, he was elected Abbot on 3 May 1964. For many years he served as an Abbot Assistant to the Abbot of Solesmes and held the role of retreat preacher and confessor. He retired in 1992 and died peacefully at Quarr. He was succeeded as abbot by Dom Leo Avery.

He appears in Tony Hendra's autobiography, Father Joe: The Man Who Saved My Soul.
