= Horringford Manor =

Manor house in Isle of Wight, United Kingdom

Horringford Manor is a manor house on the Isle of Wight, situated in the parish of Arreton.

== History ==
It is classed by Mr. Moody as a manor identical with the Domesday entry of Ovingefort, then held by Godric the king's thegn. The difficulty of accepting this identification lies in the presence of the letter "r" and the fact of the existence of a small holding by Blackwater called Huffingford, in the 13th century written Hovyngford. Godric also held Huncheford, which had a mill, and this double tenure of holdings with very similar names may account for the somewhat puzzling entries in the Testa de Nevill, the Feudal Aids and the later fee roll among the Worsley MSS. Distinct holdings they certainly were, Horringford (Horyngforde) being held under Yaverland Manor, Huffingford (Hovyngforde) partly under Gatcombe and partly under John de Lisle—probably, like Rookley, of the manor of Appleford. The first instance of its present spelling occurs in an exchange of land lying to the west of the road "quod ducit de Areton usque ad Horingeford."

In the 13th and 14th centuries a family of Fleming held Horringford. About 1339 the estate seems to have been in the hands of Ralph Overton and Thomas Haket, who were liable for one archer. By 1346 Thomas Noreys had acquired the holding, and in 1428 John Garston, the founder of a chantry in the church of St. Thomas of Canterbury in Newport, held half a fee at Horringford which had passed three years later to John Rookley. In 1486 Richard Keen and William Middlemarsh released their rights in the manor to Joan Bowerman and John Trenchard, and this is the first time Horringford is called a manor.

John Trenchard, then Sir John, died in 1495, leaving land in Horringford, which Lady Joan Bowerman held for life, to his second son Henry in tail-male with contingent remainder to his eldest son Thomas. In the reign of Edward VI the custody of land in Horringford and the wardship of Henry Trenchard was granted to John Russell, Earl of Bedford, and in 1560 Henry Trenchard granted the manor to John Collyer. The manor was in 1613–14 in the possession of Nicholas Deane of Holdenhurst, co. Hants, who settled it at that time on his wife Frances and his heirs by her.

From the rent books of the Worsley estate, that family certainly held Horringford in the 17th century, and doubtless sold to the representative of the Cromwell family who was in possession at the beginning of the 18th century. John Pope seems to have succeeded the Cromwells in their tenure, as by his will in 1781 he left a rent-charge of 10s. annually upon Horringford for the use of the Arreton poor. In 1803 W. Roberts sold the holding to W. A. Hills, who sold to William Thatcher in 1867; he disposed of it in 1875 to T. Perrott, and finally in 1880 it was purchased by Mr. Charles Allen, whose son owned it as of 1912.

== Architecture ==
The house, standing on the high ground above the station, is an unpretentious building of the 17th century, with stone mullioned windows on the south front. It was evidently remodelled at the advent of the Cromwells, as the date stone, a later insertion, is inscribed 1718, i.e. William and Martha Cromwell.

The mill of Horringford seems to have been a separate holding, as in the tithe book of 1842 it is entered as part of Fulford. It may have been the 'water mill in Arreton' held by Richard Baskett at his death, February 1626. John Baskett settled a tenement and water mill called Horringford upon himself and his heirs in 1640. It became attached to the holding of Horringford only on its purchase by Mr. Charles Allen in 1907.
