= Father Joe =

Memoir by Tony Hendra

Father Joe: The Man Who Saved My Soul
- Author: Tony Hendra
- Language: English
- Genre: Memoir
- Publisher: Random House
- Publication date: May 18, 2004
- Publication place: United States
- Pages: 304
- ISBN: 1-4000-6184-9

Father Joe: The Man Who Saved My Soul (2004) is a memoir written by Tony Hendra, an English humorist and satirist. It was on the New York Times Best Seller list for many weeks.

== Plot summary ==
When Hendra was 14, he had an affair with a married woman. When her husband, a devout Catholic, discovered them in each other's arms, he took Hendra on a trip to Quarr Abbey, a monastery on the Isle of Wight off the coast of England. Hendra, expecting to be disciplined, was surprised when a "cartoonish" monk, Father Joseph Warrilow, instead treated him kindly. Hendra fell in love with Quarr and decided to become a monk.

When Hendra reached the age of eighteen and could legally begin his time at Quarr, Father Joe found out that Hendra had received a scholarship to Cambridge University, and he urged Hendra to first attend college and obtain a degree before he could be admitted to the monastery.

While at Cambridge, Hendra attended a theatrical revue called Beyond the Fringe. The brilliant performance by Peter Cook, Dudley Moore, Alan Bennett, and Jonathan Miller had such an impact on him that his life set off on a totally different course. In his words, "I went into that theater a monk. I came out a satirist. Save the world through prayer? I don't think so. I'm going to save it through laughter." In spite of his decision not to become a monk, he continued to visit Father Joe for more than 40 years, until Father Joe's death on April 27, 1998.
