= Quarr Abbey =

Monastery on the Isle of Wight, England

Coordinates: 50.7310°N 1.1996°W

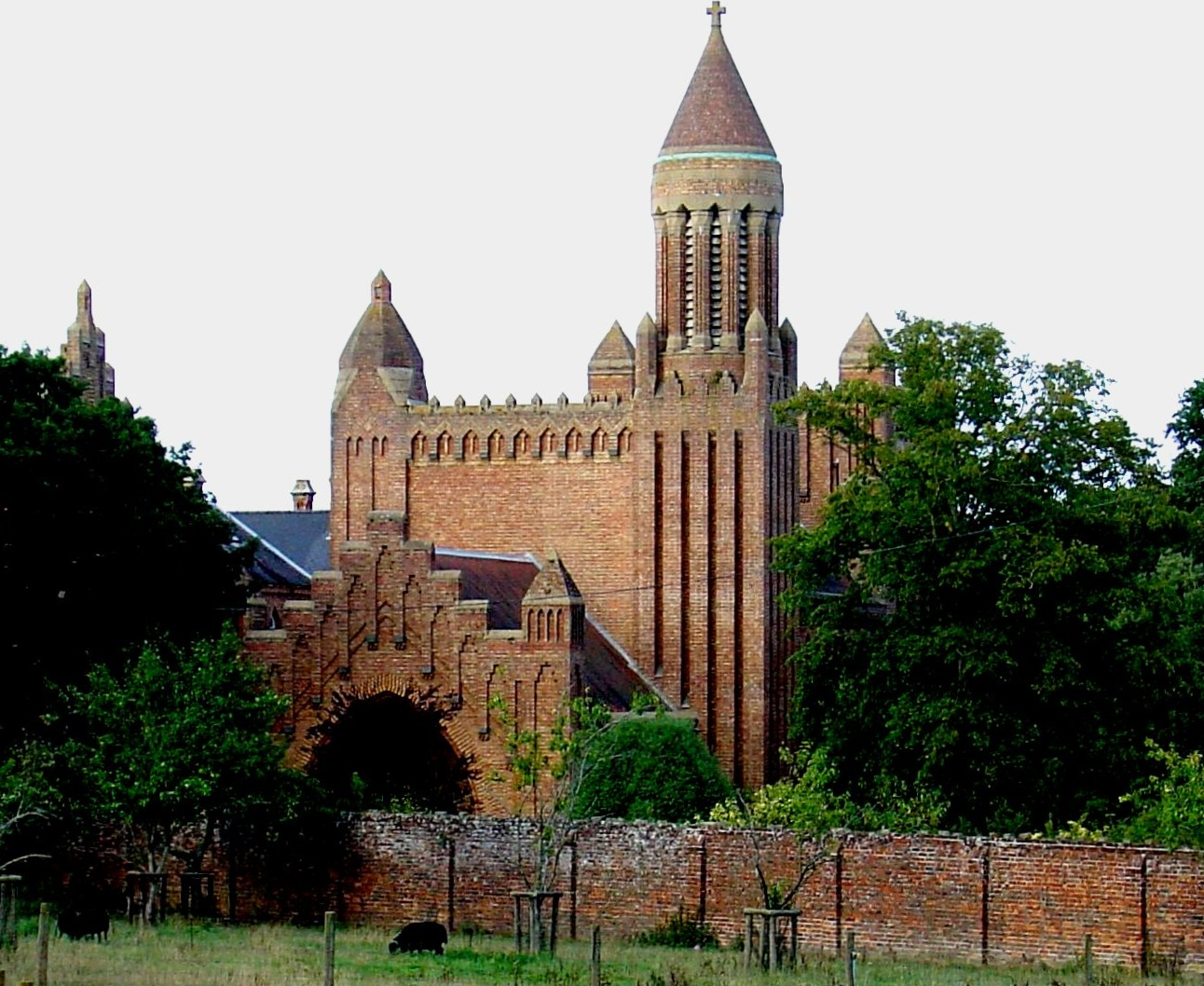
- 1912-rebuilt Quarr Abbey
- Interactive map of Quarr Abbey

Monastery information
- Full name: Abbey of Our Lady of Quarr
- Order: Benedictines
- Established: 1132
- Disestablished: 1536
- Reestablished: 1912
- Diocese: Portsmouth

People
- Founder: Baldwin de Redvers, 1st Earl of Devon

Architecture
- Status: Active
- Heritage designation: Grade I
- Style: French, Byzantine, Moorish

Site
- Location: Ryde, Isle of Wight, England
- Public access: Yes

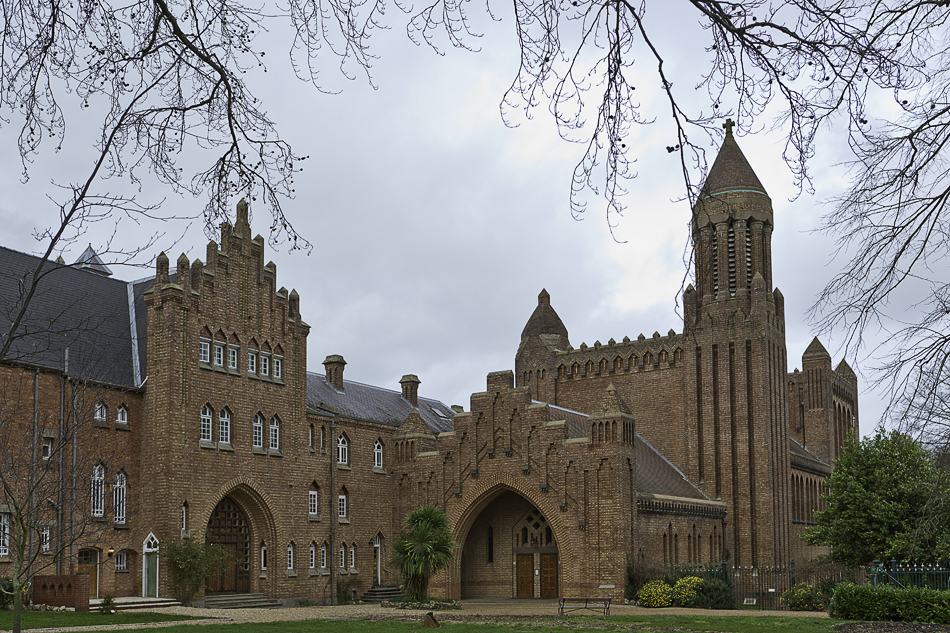
Quarr Abbey

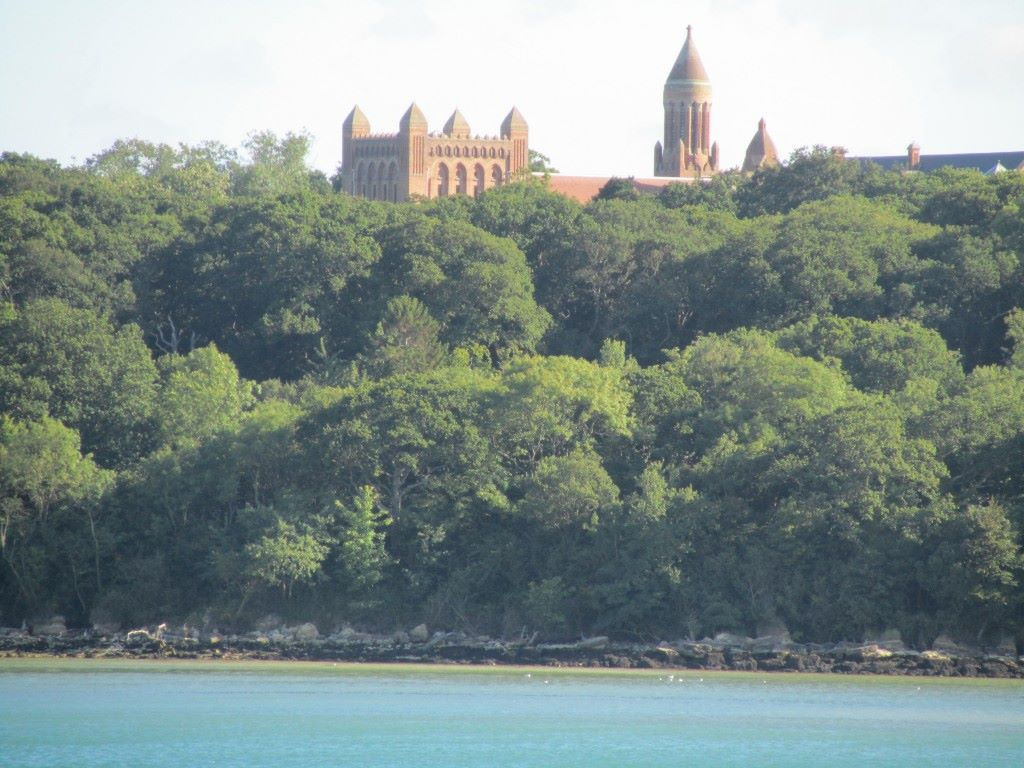
Quarr Abbey from the Solent

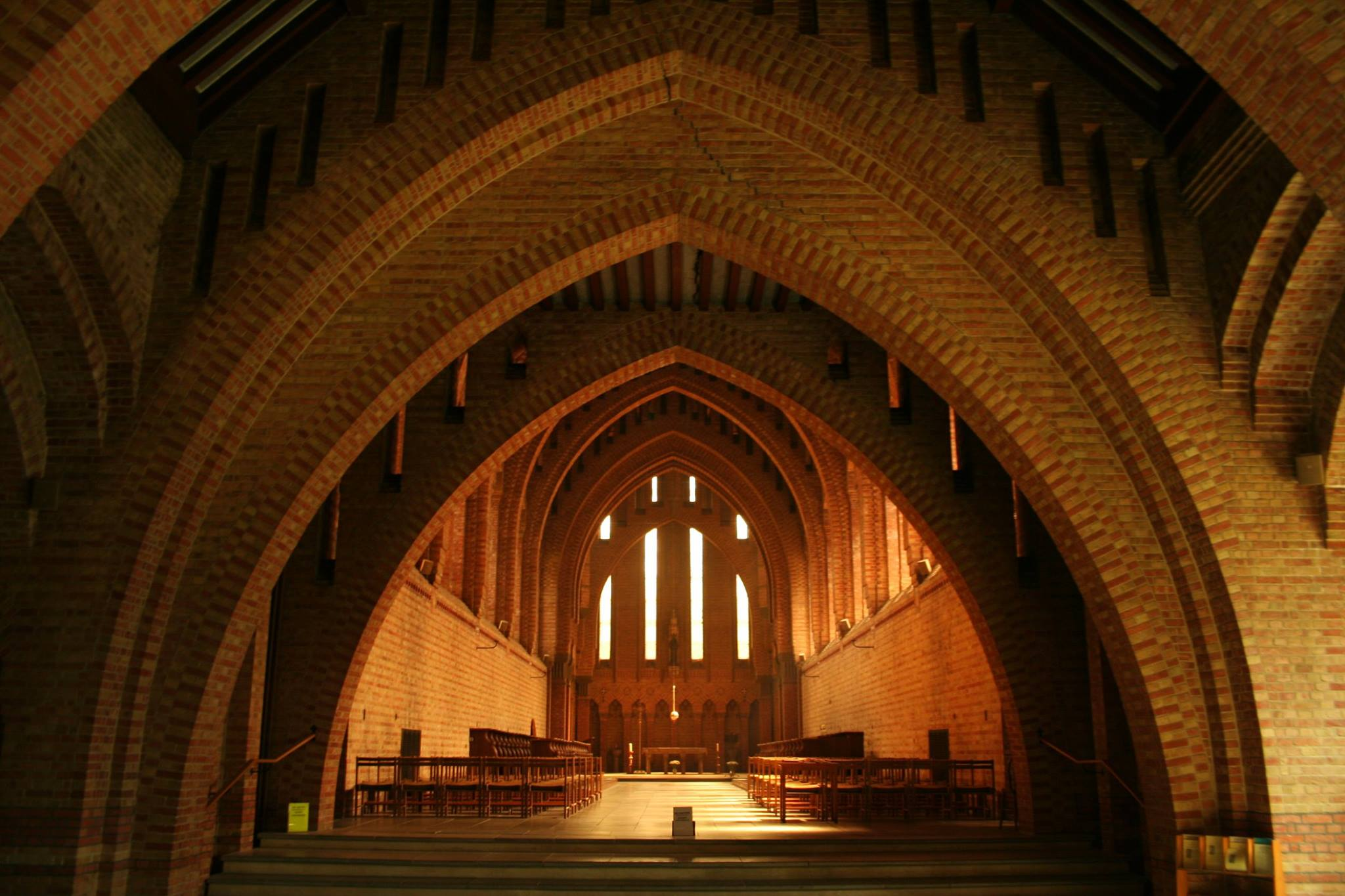
Inside the church at Quarr Abbey

"The Remains of Quarr Abbey on the Isle of Wight, Hants. The Property of John Fleming Esq." Engraving by Richard Godfrey of Long Acre, c. 1780. Published in Worsley, Sir Richard, History of the Isle of Wight, London 1781

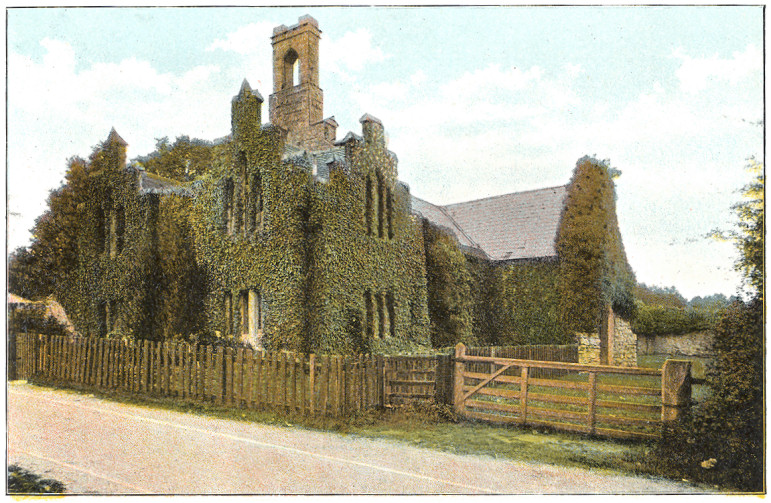
Former Quarr Abbey House, c. 1910

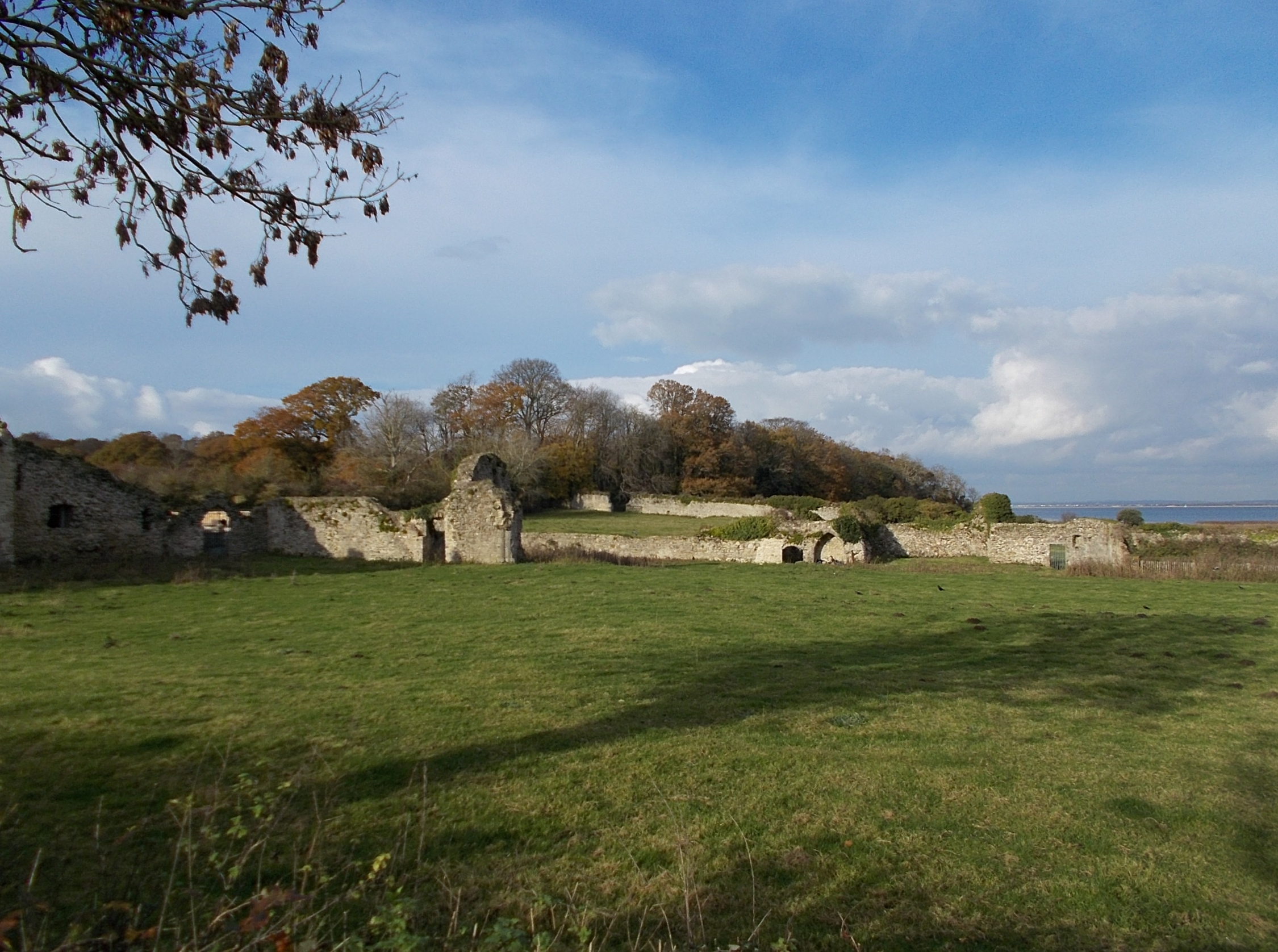
Ruins of the old abbey

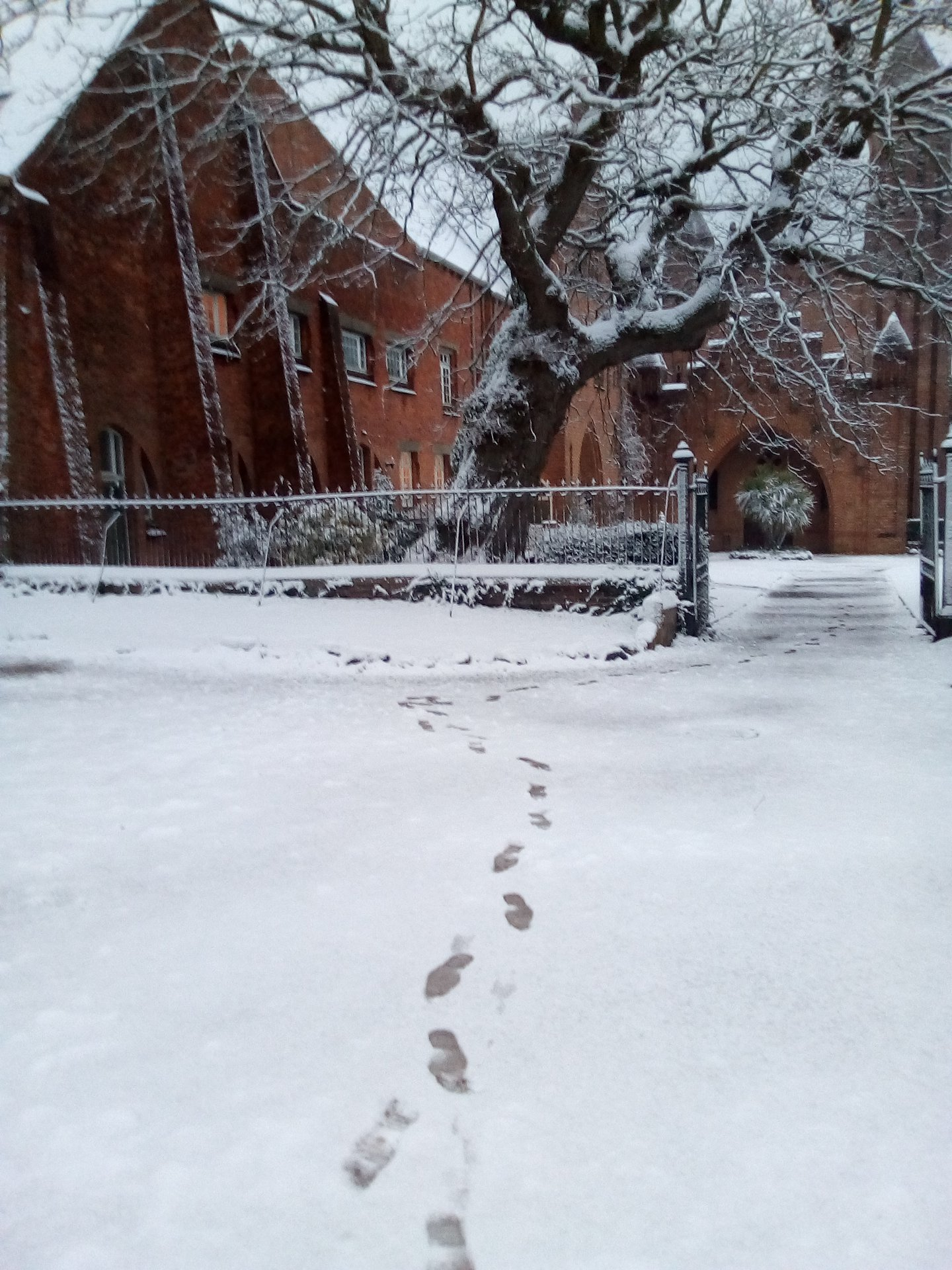
Quarr Abbey in the snow circa 2018

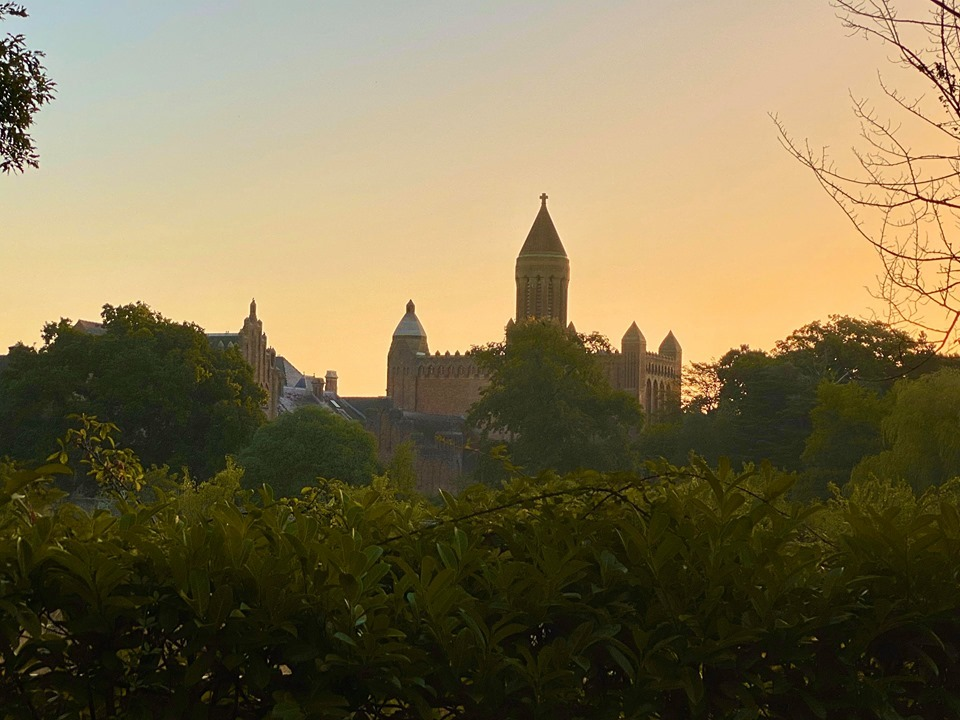
Sunrise over Quarr Abbey

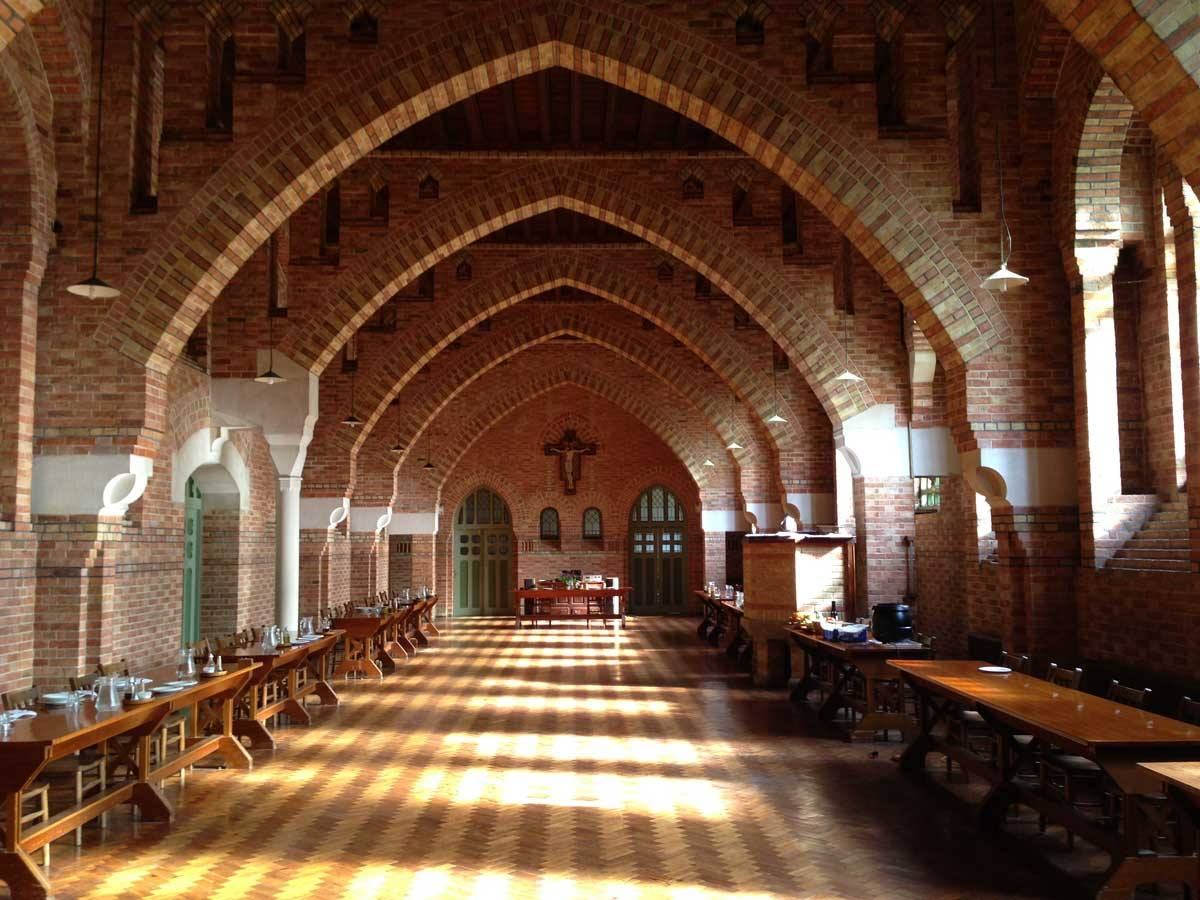
The monks eat in the refectory with those on retreat.

Quarr Abbey (French: Abbaye Notre-Dame de Quarr) is a monastery between the villages of Binstead and Fishbourne on the Isle of Wight in southern England. The name is pronounced as "Kwor" (rhyming with "for"). It belongs to the Catholic Order of St Benedict. Its formal name is the Abbey of Our Lady of Quarr.

The Grade I listed monastic buildings and church, completed in 1912, are considered some of the most important twentieth-century religious structures in the United Kingdom; Sir Nikolaus Pevsner described the Abbey as "among the most daring and successful church buildings of the early 20th century in England". They were constructed from Belgian brick in a style combining French, Byzantine and Moorish architectural elements. In the vicinity are a few remains of the original twelfth-century abbey.

A community of fewer than a dozen monks maintains the monastery's regular life and the attached farm. As of 2013, the community provides two-month internships for young men.

== History ==
=== Cistercian monastery ===
St Mary's Abbey at Quarr was part of the Cistercian Order and was founded in 1132 by Baldwin de Redvers, 1st Earl of Devon, fourth Lord of the Isle of Wight. The founder was buried in the Abbey in 1155, and his remains, along with those of a royal princess, Cecily of York (died 1507), second daughter of King Edward IV of England and godmother of Henry VIII, still lie on the site of the mediaeval monastery, as do other important personages. Arreton Manor was part of the abbey from the 12th century until 1525.

The name Quarr comes from 'quarry', because there used to be a stone quarry in the neighbourhood. The original title of the monastery was the Abbey of Our Lady and St John. Stone from the quarry was used in the Middle Ages for both ecclesiastical and military buildings, for example for parts of the Tower of London.

This site became a valuable and productive property. Because of this, it was the tradition for the abbot to be appointed warden or lord of the island. The prevalence of piracy in the area led to the granting in 1340 of special permission to fortify the area against attack. A stone wall, sea gate and portcullis were constructed. The ruins of these defences are still visible.

=== Secular ownership ===
After the Dissolution of the Monasteries in 1536, the land was acquired by a Southampton merchant, George Mills, who demolished most of the abbey. Its stone was used for fortifications at the nearby towns of Cowes and Yarmouth.

One of the three abbey bells is preserved in the belfry of the nearby Anglican Holy Cross Church, Binstead, originally built by the monks of Quarr Abbey for their lay dependants. Salvaged stone was also used to build Quarr Abbey House.

== Modern abbey ==
=== Exile of Solesmes ===
A nineteenth-century French law banned religious orders except by special dispensation, though its application varied with changes of government. As a precaution, Abbot Paul Delatte (1848–1937) of the Benedictine Solesmes Abbey had sent a monk to England to look for a house to shelter the community. A crisis came in 1880, when congregations were ordered to apply for authorisation within three months. Although this was at first brutally enforced against men's communities, protests resulted in gradual abandonment of the measures. Congregations were reconstituted. On 1 July 1901, however, tolerance towards religious communities came to an end with the passing of a new law.

The founder of Solesmes, Prosper Guéranger, had originally thought of England as a possible place of refuge should the community have to go into exile. Moreover, since 1896, at the invitation of the former Empress Eugénie, the Solesmes Benedictines had taken over as a priory the former Premonstratensian house of Farnborough Abbey, which sheltered the tomb of Napoleon III.

=== Appuldurcombe House ===
Finally, at the end of July, attention was drawn to a suitable 'large house on the Isle of Wight which seems to meet the requirements of the monks', Appuldurcombe House near Wroxall on the Isle of Wight. The house was viewed and accepted, and a lease contract was signed on 19 August 1901. A former monastic site, the construction of the house had been begun in 1701 by Sir Robert Worsley on the site of a Tudor manor house and completed much later (1773) by Sir Richard Worsley who, from 1787, also established there what was to become a well-known art collection. On the death of Sir Richard in 1805, the estate passed to his niece, who was married to the Second Baron and first Earl of Yarborough. The family connection with the house ended in 1855, when the estate was sold off by her son, the Second Earl of Yarborough.

The monks wasted no time in beginning their transfer from Solesmes to the Isle of Wight and, on Saturday 21 September 1901, practically the entire community of Solesmes reached Appuldurcombe.

=== New abbey on site of Quarr Abbey House ===
The lease of the Appuldurcombe property was due to run out in 1907, and it was decided to seek a permanent property nearby. An obvious candidate was the nearby site of the ruined medieval Cistercian abbey, with its lands. The estate had a wooded area and a short stretch of coast. It also included Quarr Abbey House, though this was too small to accommodate the sizeable community of monks, not to mention the large internal spaces required by monastic life.

A first group of monks arrived at Quarr Abbey House from Appuldurcombe on 25 June 1907 to prepare the grounds and the beginnings of a kitchen garden. They also put up fencing around the property, established a chicken farm and planted an orchard.

One of the monks, Dom Paul Bellot, aged 31, was an architect. He designed and draughted plans for the new abbey, incorporating and extending Quarr Abbey House, some distance from the ruins of the medieval monastery. 300 workers from the Isle of Wight, accustomed to building only dwelling-houses, raised a building whose design and workmanship is admired by all who visit the Abbey. The building of the refectory and three sides of the cloister began in 1907 and was completed inside one year. The rest of the monks came from Appuldurcombe and, in April 1911, work began on the Abbey church which was quickly completed and consecrated on 12 October 1912. It was built with tall pointed towers of glowing Flemish brick, adding a touch of Byzantium to the skyline. The monastic buildings are considered some of the most important twentieth-century religious structures in the United Kingdom.

In 1922, after World War I, the community of Solesmes returned to France. A small community of monks was left at Quarr which, from being a priory of Solesmes, became in 1937 an independent abbey, with English monks recruited to the community.

With a shrinking community and ageing buildings the World Monuments Fund identified Quarr Abbey as one of the 100 most endangered historic sites in the world. In July 2012 the Heritage Lottery Fund awarded Quarr a £1.9 million matching grant. The project included repair and conservation of the abbey remains and existing abbey church, as well as a visitor information centre and education and training placements in construction for local college students. In the Bellot Abbey, repairs were carried out to remedy rain penetration. In 2021 a grant of £229,817 was made by Historic England for roof and window repairs.

As an observant community in the Solesmes tradition, the independent Quarr had always given close attention to the matter of the chant and had a reputation for its effective promotion. Over the years it received many visitors seeking to benefit from the community's technical expertise as well as to experience its evident spiritual value.

In July 2013, the Abbey hosted a Chant Forum, a five-day course on early polyphony and Gregorian Chant.

=== Abbots ===
- Dom Marie-Gabriel Tissot, OSB, Abbot 1937 - 1964
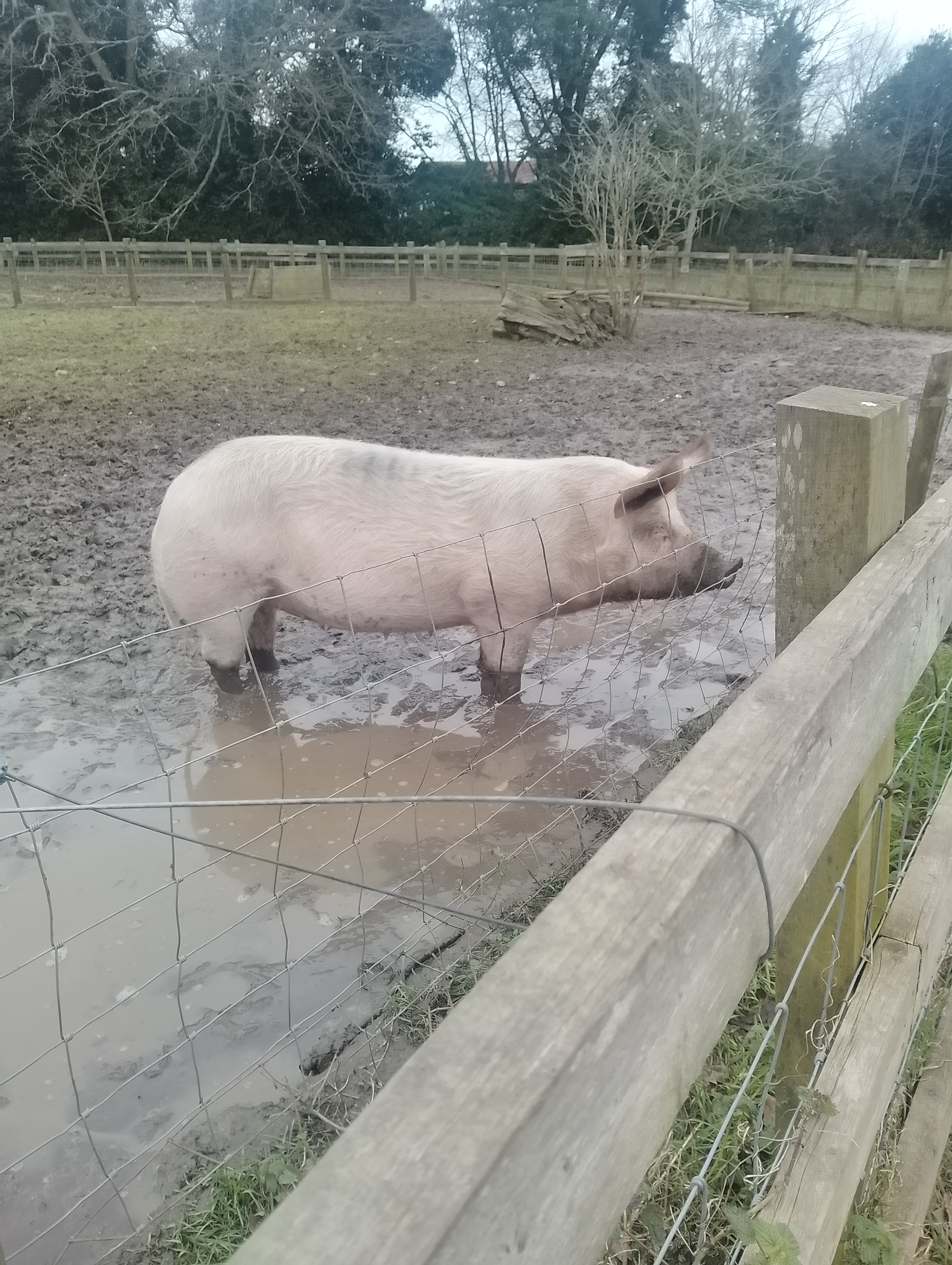
  A pig at Quarr Abbey
- Dom Aelred Sillem, OSB, Abbot 1964 - 1992
- Dom Leo Avery, OSB, Abbot 1992 - 1996
- Dom Cuthbert Johnson, OSB, Abbot Aug 1996 - March 2008
- Dom Finbar Kealy, OSB, Prior Administrator 2008 - 2013
- Dom Xavier Perrin, OSB, was appointed as Prior Administrator in May 2013, having previously held the position of Prior at Kergonan Abbey, Brittany. He was elected Abbot by the community in the presence of the Abbot of Solesmes on 11 May 2016.

=== Day-to-day life ===
Benedictine monks strive to dedicate their lives to the glory of God, and to the Rule of Saint Benedict, which sees their time structured between prayer, work and community life. There are seven public services each day, beginning with Vigils at 5.30 in the morning. Lauds then follows at 7 am during the week and at 10 am on a Sunday. Daily Mass is at 9 am during the week and at 10 am on a Sunday. Sext is at 1 pm, with Nones at 2.20, Vespers at 5pm and Compline at 8 pm. Each of the monks has jobs to do around the monastery and its grounds. Father Nicholas, for example, is the guestmaster, tending to those on retreat, but he is also the abbey's bookbinder and bee keeper. Pilgrims to Quarr can stroll around the gardens, tea shop, visitor centre, and book shop, and see the works of local artists in the monastery's gallery.

=== Retreats ===
According to the Rule of Saint Benedict, "All guests who present themselves are to be welcomed as Christ", and as such, Quarr Abbey makes no distinction in who it allows to stay within the monastery's guest house facilities, regardless of what denomination they may or may not be. Payment for a stay comes in the form of a donation, based on what the guest can or cannot afford, and no one is ever turned away simply because they cannot afford it. Father Nicholas, the guestmaster is constantly on hand to show visitors to their rooms and to sit and chat with them in that of the common room. Meals are provided for those on retreat, with breakfast being around 7.30am, lunch at 1.15pm and supper at 7pm. Whilst the guests are welcome to participate in all seven of the services that take place in a day, these are in no way compulsory. Such is the popularity of Quarr, many well known people have stayed there including the musicians Scott Walker and Phil Collins, and people return time after time, from all four corners of the globe.

== In literature ==
Tony Hendra devotes much of his 2004 memoir, Father Joe: The Man Who Saved My Soul, to his experiences at Quarr Abbey.

In his 1929 memoir, Good-Bye to All That, Robert Graves describes visiting Quarr Abbey whilst recovering on the Isle of Wight during the Great War. The fresh grains, vegetables and fruits at the Abbey helped change Graves' previously held negative views of Catholicism.

== Burials in the old abbey ==
- Baldwin de Redvers, 1st Earl of Devon and wife Adelize Ballon (d. circa 1146)
- Cecily of York and husband Thomas Kymbe

== Bibliography ==
- S.F. Hockey, Quarr Abbey and Its Lands, 1132–1631, Leicester University Press, 1970.
