= Arreton Manor =

Manor house in Arreton, Isle of Wight, England

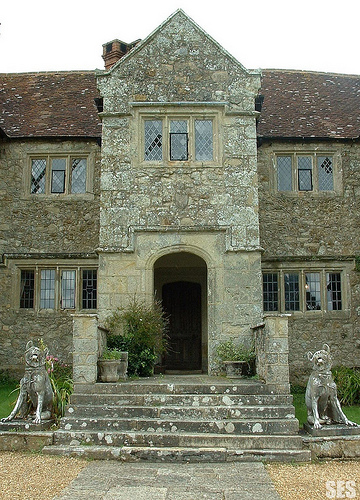
- Arreton Manor

- Location within Isle of Wight

General information
- Architectural style: Jacobean
- Location: Arreton, Isle of Wight, England
- Coordinates: 50°40′40″N 1°14′46″W
- Construction started: 872

Arreton Manor is a manor house in Arreton, Isle of Wight, England. Its history is traced to 872 AD to the time of King Alfred the Great and his parents. It was left by King Alfred by his will to his youngest son Aethelweard. Once owned by William the Conqueror, as mentioned in the Domesday Book in 1086, in the 12th century it became part of Quarr Abbey and was used by the monks for over 400 years. In 1525, it was leased to the Leigh family. The manor was rebuilt between 1595 and 1612. Built in Jacobean style, it is in the shape of a "H".

== History ==
=== Early history ===
Arreton Manor's history dates back to at least 872 AD. In his will, King Alfred the Great bequeathed the manor of Arreton to his youngest son, Aethelweard, in 885. Previously, it had been owned by his mother, Osburga, and her father Oslac, Chief Butler of England. The manor was owned by King Edward before the Norman conquest.

After 1086, it was owned by William the Conqueror. In 1100, it was granted to Richard de Redvers, and was part of an endowment given to the monks of the Quarr Abbey by his son Baldwin in 1131. It was confirmed to the convent by Isabel de Fortibus in 1278. The manor was farmed by the monks in Quarr Abbey for about 400 years until 1525.

=== 16th–17th centuries ===
In 1525, it was leased by Abbot William Rippon to a parish landholder, John Leigh. The manor was rebuilt between 1595 and 1612. Charles I visited the manor several times. Sir Thomas Bennet added the new porch and oak panelling in the major rooms. The original manor house was far older, however. It is claimed that Queen Mary often visited Arreton Manor.

Arreton Manor was leased to several different farmers until 1628, when it was granted by the king to trustees to settle the king's debts to the City of London. It was then bought by two merchants from the trustees. It was later bought by Thomas Colepeper, 2nd Baron Colepeper, Governor of the Isle of Wight. On Lord Culpeper's death, his daughter Lady Katherine, acquired the property. Lady Katherine married Lord Fairfax and it stayed in the Fairfax family for 230 years. Its history then followed that of the island community, and the manor was farmed by the abbot's steward till 1525, when it was leased by the last Abbot William Rippon to John Leigh, who already held land in the parish. After the Dissolution, it was granted to various farmers by the Crown until 1628, when it was granted by the king by trustees for the payment of his debts to the City of London. The manor then followed the same descent as that of Newport to the Wykeham-Martin family, in whose hands it remained until the 20th century. Queen Victoria supposedly planted a conifer on the manor's south lawn.

=== 20th century ===
The house was purchased from Count Slade de Pomeroy by Jeanne Schroeder in 1987. She sold it to a family named Clark, who closed the house to the public in 1999. It was subsequently bought by Andy and Julia Gray-Ling in 2004, and re-opened to the public, during which time it displayed a Living History display by the Church, State and Household group every August before it was closed and made a private residence again. In August 2017, the manor was purchased by Nathalie Pulford and the manor is still a private residence.

== Architecture ==
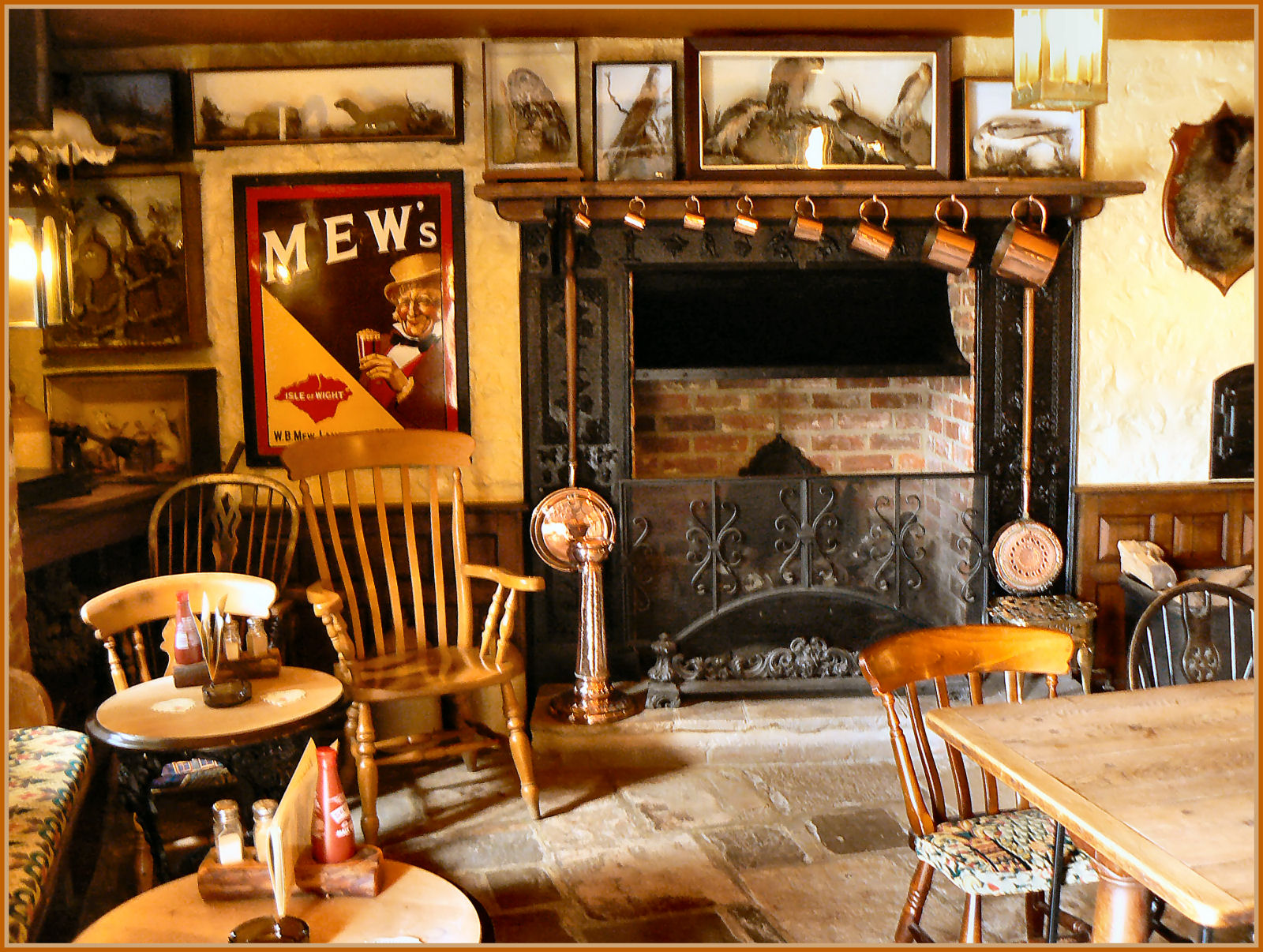
Arreton Manor public house

=== Style ===
Arreton is a typical example of the Jacobean manor house of the old Isle of Wight. It was rebuilt over an older house between 1637 and 1639 by Humphrey Bennett. He had purchased the old house in 1630. The manor was built as a two storied structure in an "H" layout; such a centre block with projecting wings was common in the 17th century. The extended portion on the left side, which was added in 1832 in the same architectural style, has disturbed the structure's symmetry. The interior woodwork is elaborate, but the exterior is plain.

=== Interior ===
The original inner door with its knocker still remains. The plan has a central hall with rooms on either side; the western portion is comparatively modern. In the room to the right of the hall, the panelling is noteworthy, though some of it has evidently been brought from elsewhere. The cornice is supported by well-proportioned turned columns, with square pilasters below the mantelshelf. Also seen is a frieze of the foliage and garlands suspended from the lions’ mouths. The house has 17th century panelling with Ionic pilasters which have decorations of vine stems, particularly on the west wall. The windows in the manor house are "mullioned in the range of three to five". On the east wall, there is pilaster of "stylized figure under cocked hat". The hall has panelling of simple design with fluted pilasters. The east side of the hall has the staircase (with rounded newels and widely spaced balustrades) concealed by an ordinary looking screen. On the first floor, in the bedroom, is an oak mantelpiece with a curious carved panel above, representing the offering up of Isaac. It is Flemish in character, and it is doubtful if it belongs to the rest of the chimney piece. The cellar of the house contains concrete block bearing a Rosy Cross, and such a cross was previously included in a stained glass window. This may suggest that Rosicrucians met at Arreton, probably within living memory.

Percy Stone’s Antiquities of the Isle of Wright illustrates many manor house chimney designs; Arreton Manor had two such chimneys, one in-situ in the manor house while the other has been shifted to Priory Bay Hotel in St Helens. This chimney piece, located in the west wing of the hall, reaching from floor to ceiling, is an excellent specimen of the work of the period. In the centre is a shield of arms: Gules a bezant between three demi-lions argent with the difference of a crescent, which are the coat of arms of Bennet in an arched frame, impaling a fess with three trefoils in the chief; on either side are panels cross patterned representing Peace and War or "Mars and the Goddess of Plenty" (small carvings in relief). The stone fireplace here is simple.

=== Exterior ===
The building was constructed with "limestone rubble with freestone dressings". It has gabled roofs with a symmetrical front elevation. The porch is double storied and the hall on the southeast is entered through this porch. The porch, with its date tablet of 1639, is an addition put up soon after the house was finished.

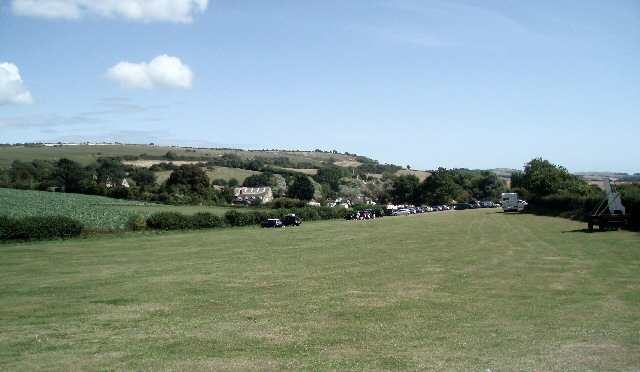
Manor grounds

== Grounds ==
Arreton Manor House lies under the south slope of the chalk down. The manor is close to the church. To the east of the house is a 16th–17th century dovecote with a four-centred arched opening and stone mullioned windows, and to the south stands a 17th-century barn of noble proportions, with a chestnut roof worthy of notice.

== Cultural references ==
Arreton Manor, fictionalised as "Arden Manor", is a central location of the 1889 Maxwell Gray novel, The Reproach of Annesley.
