= Arreton =

Village on the Isle of Wight, England

Coordinates: 50°40′35″N 1°14′39″W

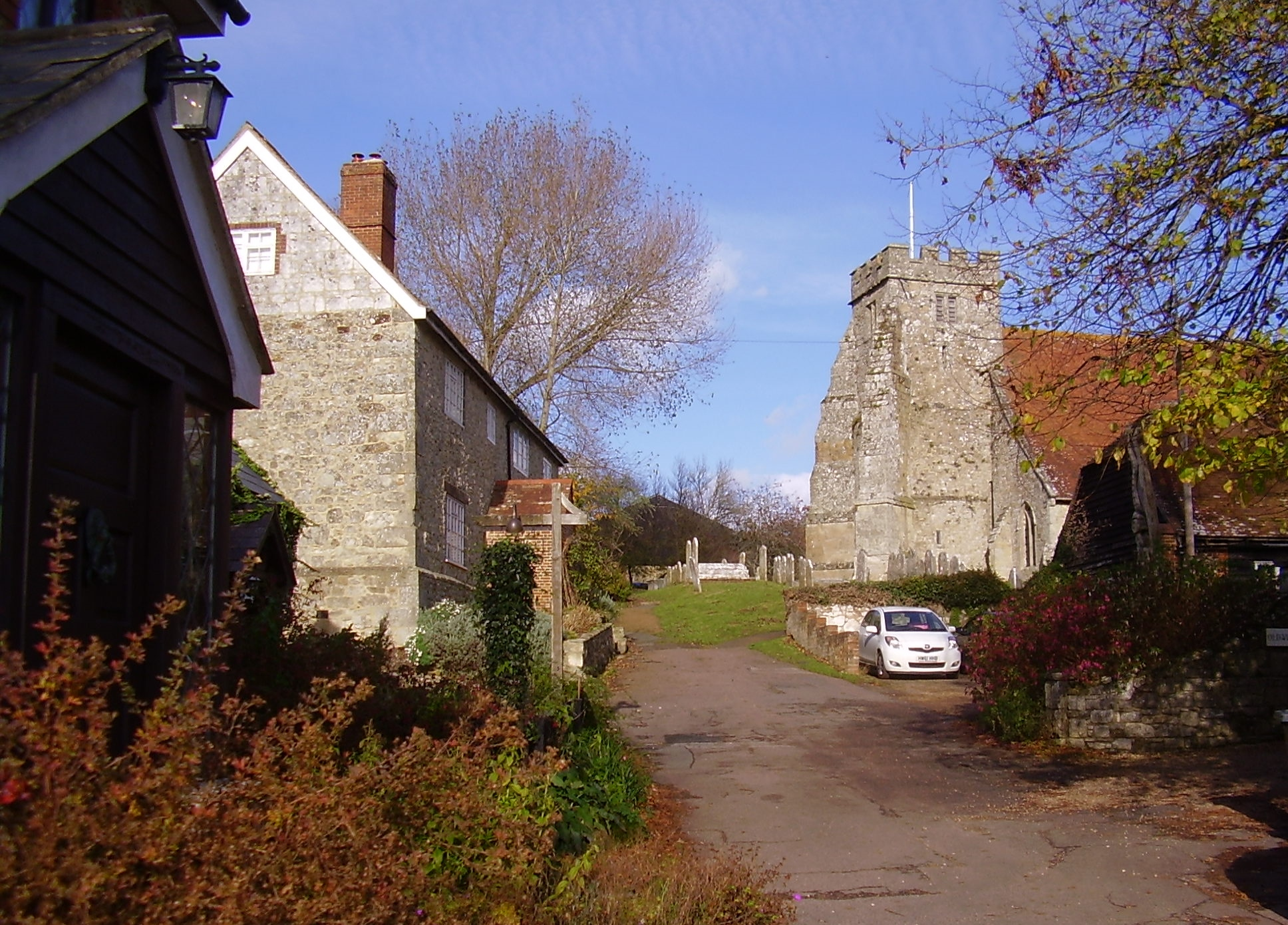
- Arreton Old Village

- Location within the Isle of Wight
- Area: 7.465 sq mi (19.33 km^{2})
- Population: 1,037 (2021 census)
  - Density: 139/sq mi (54/km^{2})
- OS grid reference: SZ545865
- Civil parish: Arreton
- Unitary authority: Isle of Wight
- Ceremonial county: Isle of Wight
- Region: South East
- Country: England
- Sovereign state: United Kingdom
- Post town: Newport
- Postcode district: PO30
- Dialling code: 01983
- Police: Hampshire and Isle of Wight
- Fire: Hampshire and Isle of Wight
- Ambulance: Isle of Wight
- UK Parliament: Isle of Wight West

Arreton is a village and civil parish in the central eastern part of the Isle of Wight, England. It is about 3 miles (4.8 km) southeast of Newport.

The parish includes the hamlets of Blackwater, Hale Common, Horringford and Merstone. In 2021, it had a population of 1,037.

To the north of the village lies Arreton Down, a chalk hill designated as a Site of Special Scientific Interest.

Southern Vectis bus route 8 passes through the village on its way between Newport and Ryde via Sandown and Bembridge. The Downs Tour serves the village during the summer.

== Name ==
The name means 'the farmstead or settlement associated with a man called Ēadhere', from Old English Ēadhere (personal name), -ing- and tūn.

In an 11th century copy of King Alfred's will (c. 880), it was recorded as Eaderingtune. It has variously been recorded as Adrintone (in 1086), Aretona (c. 1145), Arretone (1235), Athertone (1255) and Areton (1297).

== History ==
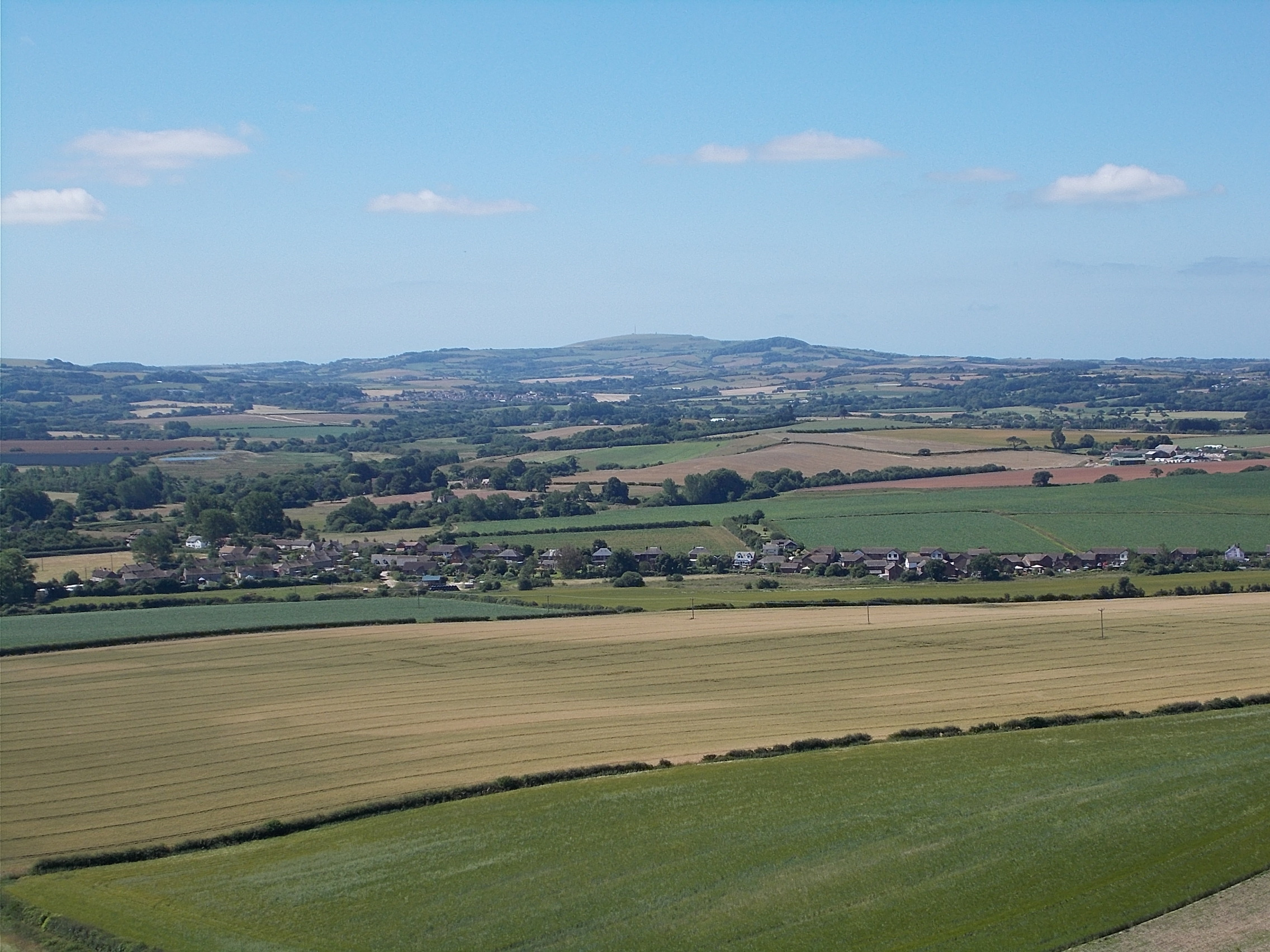
Arreton (linear settlement nearest to the camera) set within Arreton Valley.

Evidence of habitation during Bronze Age Britain are the "two round barrows, the larger, some 9 feet high, known locally as Michael Morey's Hump".

The Arreton church of St George was first begun in the Norman era. The monks of Quarr helped to extend the Church of St. George around 1160. A tower was added in 1299. In the fourteenth century, a brass effigy of Harry Hawles, Steward of the Island on behalf of Montecute, Earl of Salisbury, was added to the church's interior. The brass effigy is missing its head and also the coat of arms.

There is a note marking Hawle's resting place that reads:

Here is ybried under this grave
Harry Hawles, his soul god save
Long tyme steward of the yle of wyght
have m'cy on hym, god ful of myght.

A renowned bowling green in Arreton Parish flourished during the 16th and 17th centuries. "I have seen," wrote Sir John Oglander (1595–1648), "with my Lord Southampton at St. George's Down at bowls some thirty or forty knights and gentlemen, where our meeting was then twice every week, Tuesday and Thursday, and we had an ordinary there and card-tables."

Arreton appears as the central location, fictionalised as "Arden", in the 1889 Maxwell Gray novel, The Reproach of Annesley.

The parish of Arreton was at one time one of the largest on the Isle of Wight. In 1894, Arreton was divided into the parishes of North Arreton and South Arreton. In 1898, part of South Arreton was transferred to Godshill, and part of Godshill was transferred to South Arreton in return. North Arreton was absorbed into Whippingham in 1907.

== Governance ==
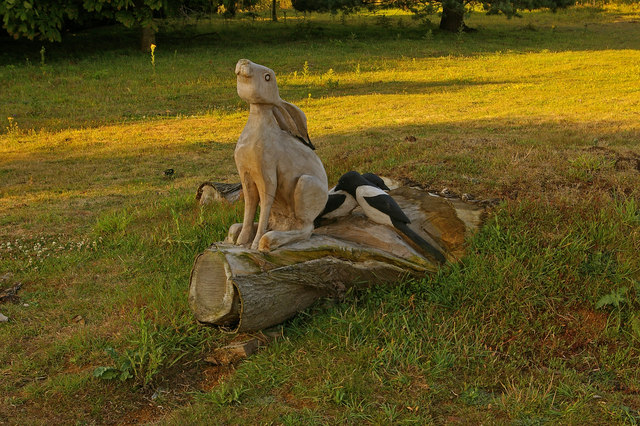
Good Omen, 2008 work by the wood sculptor Paul Sivell, fashioned in situ out of the remains of a Leyland Cypress at Arreton Cross, commissioned by Arreton Parish Council and the Island 2000 Trust.

Arreton is part of the electoral ward called Arreton and Newchurch. At the 2011 census the population of this ward was 3,610.

== Demographics ==
Census population of Arreton parish
Census	Population	Female	Male	Households	Source
2001	1,015	533	482	383	
2011	988	519	469	394	
2021	1,037	542	495	422	

== Culture and community ==
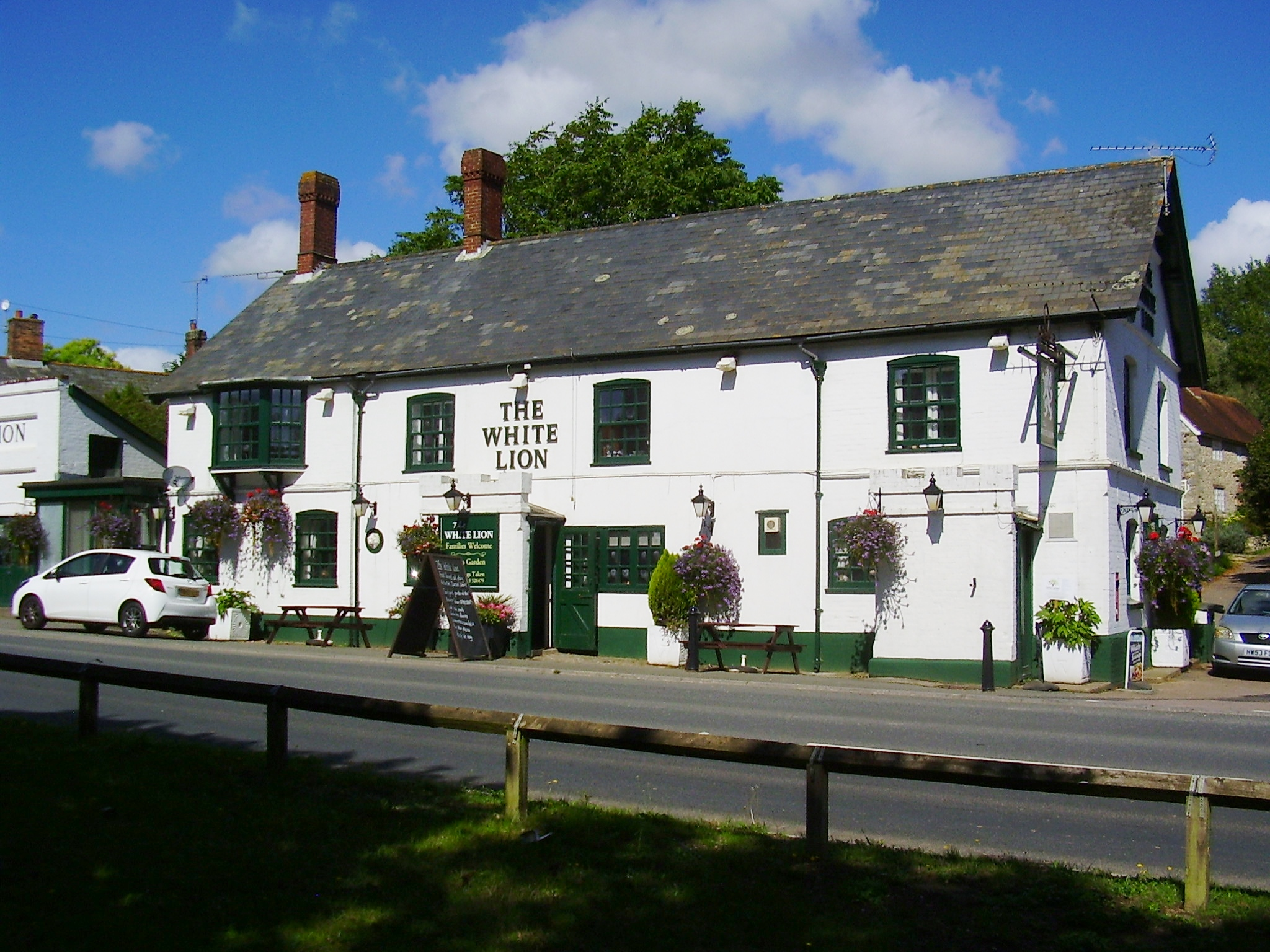
The White Lion Inn

The village has two inns with a long history. The White Lion Inn has been in business for two centuries, and was a staging inn on the A3056 road between Newport and Sandown. At one time, there was a Red Lion Inn nearby. The Arreton Barns Craft Village commercial complex contains a pub called "The Dairyman's Daughter", named after a best selling book about a girl (Elizabeth Wallbridge) from Arreton by Legh Richmond.

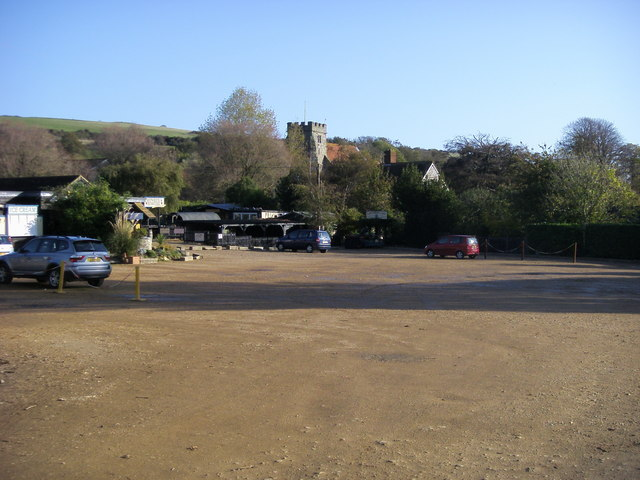
Arreton Barns

Arreton is home to the Shipwreck Centre and Maritime Museum, which moved to the Arreton Barns Complex from Bembridge after 26 years. It is housed in a grade II listed stone barn at Jacob's Yard in the Arreton Barns Centre. Visitors to the Shipwreck Centre can buy a variety of souvenirs and salvaged objects, including Copper ingots from a Victorian steamer ship which capsized off the coast nearby.

Arreton Athletic, the village's local football team, play in Division 3 of the Isle of Wight Saturday Football League.

== Landmarks ==
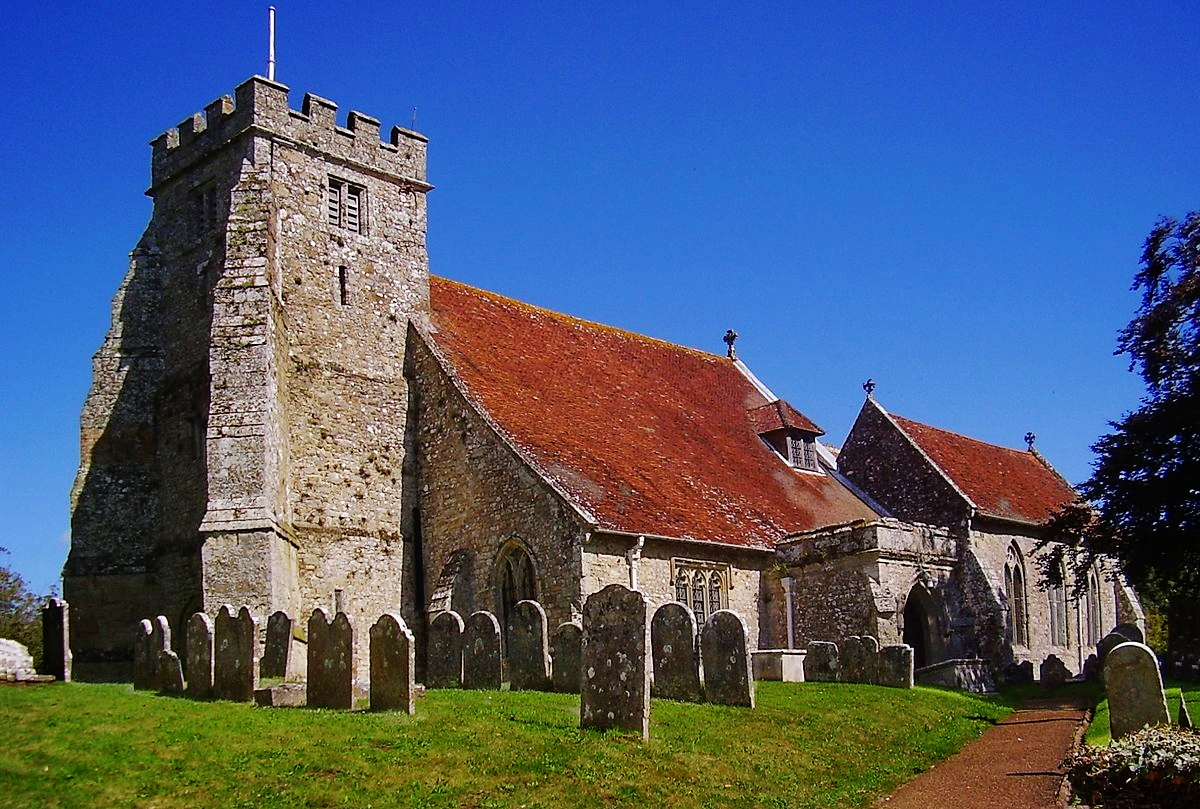
St George's Church

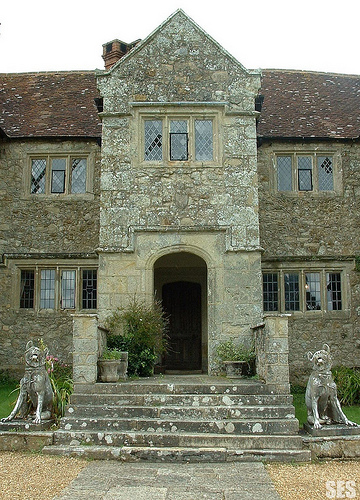
Arreton Manor

St. George's Church, Arreton is renowned. The war memorial was designed by local architect, Percy Stone (1856–1934). On the road to the church is the 17th century Stile Cottage which was previously used to store ales for the church.

Opposite the church is the Island Brass Rubbing Centre, Lavender Cottage (which sells lavender products) and a wood carving of St. George and the dragon by local sculptor Paul Sivell.

Arreton Manor, the local manor house, was rebuilt between 1595 and 1612 by Sir Humphrey Barnet. Arreton Manor is mentioned in the Domesday Book (1086) and has been owned by at least eight monarchs, the earliest being King Alfred the Great who left it in his will to his youngest son Aethelweard. King Charles I reviewed troops on the lawn in 1629, and Queen Victoria planted a tree in the garden.

There are or were several ancient mills in Arreton. The mill at Horringford was apparently a paper mill.

There are 8 war memorials in Arreton, most in St George's Church.
