= Anglican Diocese of Portsmouth =

Diocese of the Church of England

Coordinates: 50°47′25″N 1°06′15″W

Diocese of Portsmouth Dioecesis Portus Magni
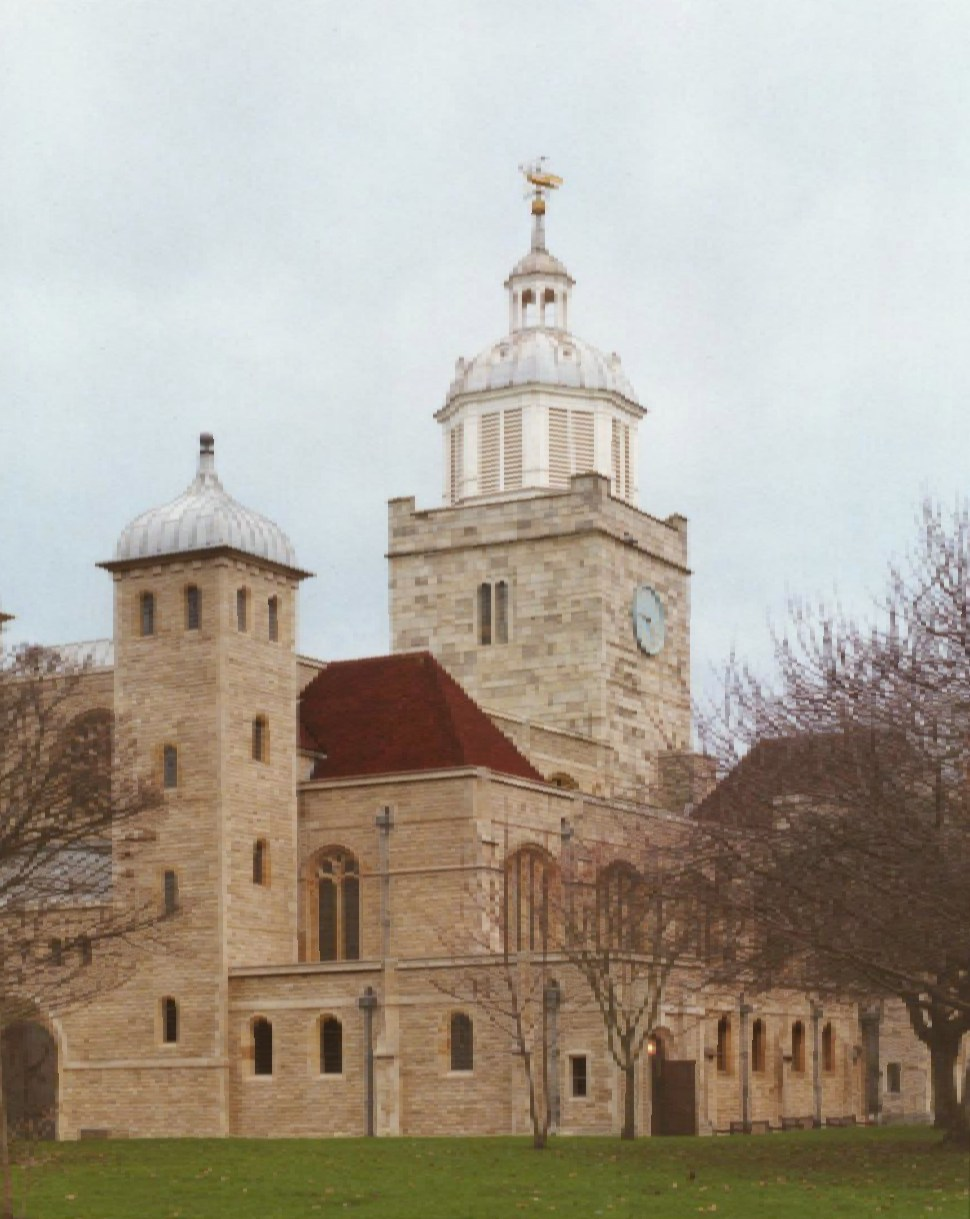
- Portsmouth cathedral

- Coat of arms

- Flag

Location
- Country: England
- Ecclesiastical province: Canterbury
- Archdeaconries: Portsdown, the Meon, Isle of Wight
- Headquarters: Peninsular House, Portsmouth

Statistics
- Parishes: 133
- Churches: 173

Information
- Denomination: Church of England
- Cathedral: Cathedral Church of St Thomas of Canterbury
- Language: English

Current leadership
- Bishop: Jonathan Frost, Bishop of Portsmouth
- Archdeacons: Steve Daughtery, Archdeacon of the Isle of Wight; Kathryn Percival, Archdeacon of the Meon; Bob White, Archdeacon of Portsdown

Website
- www.portsmouth.anglican.org

The Diocese of Portsmouth is an administrative division of the Church of England Province of Canterbury in England. The diocese covers south-east Hampshire and the Isle of Wight. The see is based in the City of Portsmouth in Hampshire, where the seat is located at the Cathedral Church of St Thomas of Canterbury.

== Origin ==
The Diocese of Portsmouth was created on 1 May 1927 under George V from the Diocese of Winchester. It consists of the three archdeaconries of:

- Portsdown (comprising the deaneries of Portsmouth and Havant);
- The Meon (comprising the deaneries of Fareham, Gosport, Petersfield and Bishop's Waltham);
- The Isle of Wight (comprising the deanery of the Isle of Wight).

== Bishops ==
The Bishop of Portsmouth leads the diocese as one of three diocesan bishops in the Church of England not assisted by a suffragan bishop, the others being the Bishop of Hereford and the Bishop of Sodor and Man

Alternative episcopal oversight (for parishes in the diocese which do not accept the ordination of women as priests) is provided by the provincial episcopal visitor, the Bishop suffragan of Richborough. On 10 December 2024, it was announced that the next Bishop suffragan of Richborough, Luke Irvine-Capel, will be "based" in the diocese. There are also two former bishops living in the diocese who are licensed as honorary assistant bishops:

- 2012–present: Timothy Bavin, oblate master at Alton Abbey, is a retired Bishop of Portsmouth.
- 2012–present: John Hind, retired Bishop of Chichester, lives in Emsworth, Hampshire.

== Safeguarding ==
The Anglican Diocese of Portsmouth had a number of sexual abuse convictions in the 1980s and 1990s. Timothy Bavin was the Bishop between 1985 and 1995 and during this time a number of serious safeguarding issues took place. For example, Bavin did not report Fr Terry Knight to the police when parents raised their concerns to him in 1985. Knight was allowed to continue in his position until he was later convicted for sexually abusing boys in 1996 and again in 2016. Bavin had also allowed a convicted paedophile Fr Michael Gover to resume working for the church on his release in 1990. Gover was convicted in 1985 at around the same time as parents raising their concerns about Knight. Bavin stood down in 1995 whilst Knight's police investigation and court case was taking place.

== Archdeaconries and deaneries ==
Diocese	Archdeaconry	Deanery	Paid clergy	Churches	Population	People/clergy	People/church	Churches/clergy
Diocese of Portsmouth	Archdeaconry of Portsdown	Deanery of Havant	16	26	149,426	9,339	5,747	1.63
Diocese of Portsmouth	Archdeaconry of Portsdown	Deanery of Portsmouth	23*	26*	202,016	8,783	7,770	1.13
Diocese of Portsmouth	Archdeaconry of the Isle of Wight	Deanery of the Isle of Wight	21	60	138,259	6,584	2,304	2.86
Diocese of Portsmouth	Archdeaconry of the Meon	Deanery of Bishop's Waltham	7	17	28,844	4,121	1,697	2.43
Diocese of Portsmouth	Archdeaconry of the Meon	Deanery of Fareham	14	13	117,854	8,418	9,066	0.93
Diocese of Portsmouth	Archdeaconry of the Meon	Deanery of Gosport	8	10	82,625	10,328	8,263	1.25
Diocese of Portsmouth	Archdeaconry of the Meon	Deanery of Petersfield	12	20	40,808	3,401	2,040	1.67
Total/average			104	170	759,832	7,306	4,470	1.63

*including Cathedral

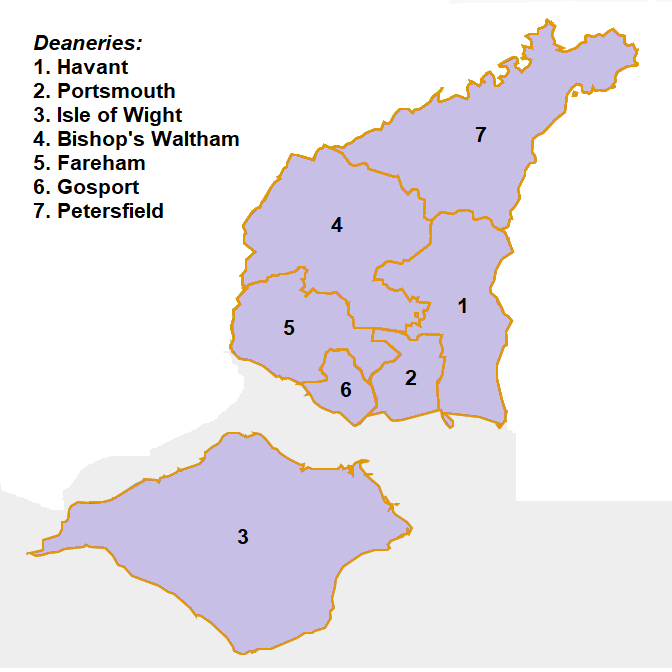
Deaneries of the Diocese of Portsmouth

== List of churches ==
=== Not in a deanery ===
Benefice	Church	Link	Founded (building)	Clergy	Pop. served
Cathedral	Cathedral of St Thomas of Canterbury, Portsmouth		Medieval	4	4,396

=== Deanery of Havant ===
Benefice	Church	Link	Founded (building)	Clergy	Pop. served
Bedhampton (St Nicholas's Mission Church) (St Thomas)	St Thomas, Bedhampton		Ancient (Medieval)	1	9,874
Bedhampton (St Nicholas's Mission Church) (St Thomas)	St Nicholas, Bedhampton		1959	1	9,874
Blendworth (Holy Trinity) with Chalton with Idsworth	Holy Trinity, Blendworth		1851	0	1,055
Blendworth (Holy Trinity) with Chalton with Idsworth	St Michael & All Angels, Chalton		Medieval	0	77
Blendworth (Holy Trinity) with Chalton with Idsworth	St Hubert, Idsworth		Ancient	0	150
Catherington (All Saints) and Clanfield	All Saints, Catherington		Medieval	0	9,086
Catherington (All Saints) and Clanfield	St James, Clanfield		Medieval (1875)	0	3,745
Cowplain (St Wilfrid)	St Wilfrid, Cowplain		1923	2	13,421
Cowplain (St Wilfrid)	Westbrook Church			2	13,421
Crookhorn (Good Shepherd)	Good Shepherd, Crookhorn		1978	1	2,989
Portsdown (Christ Church)	Christ Church, Portsdown		1872	1	6,285
Purbrook (St John the Baptist)	St John the Baptist, Purbrook		1858	1	8,426
Denmead (All Saints)	All Saints, Denmead		1880	1	6,758
Hartplain (Not Known)	Hart Plain Church (CoE/Methodist)			1	8,974
Havant (St Faith)	St Faith, Havant		Medieval	3	8,487
Havant (St Faith)	St Nicholas' Chapel, Langstone		1869	3	8,487
Hayling Island (St Andrew) Eastoke	St Andrew, Eastoke		c. 1940 (1964)	1	4,687
Hayling, North (St Peter)	St Peter, North Hayling		Medieval	1	1,798
Hayling, South (St Mary)	St Mary, South Hayling		Medieval	1	10,894
Leigh Park (St Francis)	St Francis, Leigh Park		1963	1	13,099
Warren Park (St Clare)	St Clare, Warren Park		1970	1	3,278
Leigh, West (St Alban)	St Alban, West Leigh		1957 (1966)	1	9,830
Rowlands Castle (St John the Baptist)	St John the Baptist, Rowlands Castle		1838	0	2,357
Warblington (St Thomas À Becket) with Emsworth	St Thomas à Becket, Warblington		Ancient (Medieval)	2	10,709
Warblington (St Thomas À Becket) with Emsworth	St James, Emsworth		1840	2	10,709
Waterlooville (St George the Martyr)	St George, Waterlooville		1831 (1970)	1	13,447

=== Deanery of Portsmouth ===
Benefice	Church	Link	Founded (building)	Clergy	Pop. served
Cosham (St Philip)	St Philip, Cosham		1938	1	4,266
Wymering (St Peter and St Paul)	SS Peter & Paul, Wymering		Medieval	1	6,608
Farlington (St Andrew) (Church of the Resurrection)	St Andrew, Farlington		Medieval (1875)	2	15,146
Farlington (St Andrew) (Church of the Resurrection)	The Resurrection, Farlington		1930	2	15,146
Milton (St James) (St Andrew's Church Centre) (St Patrick)	St James, Milton		1841 (1913)	1	23,326
Paulsgrove (St Michael and All Angels)	St Michael & All Angels, Paulsgrove		1957	1	11,834
Portsea (All Saints)	All Saints, Portsea		1828	0	5,236
Portsea (St Mary) (St Faith and St Barnabas) (St Wilfrid)	St Mary, Portsea		Ancient (1889)	2	21,635
Portsea (St Mary) (St Faith and St Barnabas) (St Wilfrid)	St Faith, Portsea			2	21,635
Portsea (St Mary) (St Faith and St Barnabas) (St Wilfrid)	St Wilfrid, Portsea			2	21,635
Southsea (St Luke) (St Peter)	St Luke, Southsea		1861	1	13,431
Portsea (St Alban)	St Alban, Copnor		1914	2	5,542
Portsea (St Alban)	Harbour Church Portsmouth		2016	2	5,542
Portsea (St George)	St George, Portsea		1753	2	4,567
Portsea (St Cuthbert)	St Cuthbert, Copnor		1908 (1915)	0	12,167
Portsea (St Cuthbert)	St Aidan, Anchorage Park			0	12,167
Portsea (St Saviour)	St Saviour, Portsea		1901 (1913)	3	6,261
Portsea (The Ascension)	Ascension, North End		1908 (1913)	3	7,882
Portsea North End (St Mark)	St Mark, North End		1868 (1970)	3	20,608
Portsea North End (St Mark)	St Nicholas, North End		1930	3	20,608
Portsea North End (St Mark)	St Francis, Hilsea		1930 (1936)	3	20,608
Southsea (Holy Spirit)	Holy Spirit, Southsea		1858 (1958)	2	13,462
Southsea (St Jude)	St Jude, Southsea		1851	2	8,783
Southsea (St Margaret of Scotland)	St Margaret's Community Church, Southsea		2017 (1903)	0	7,554
Southsea (St Simon)	St Simon, Southsea		1858	0	9,312

=== Deanery of the Isle of Wight ===
Benefice	Church	Link	Founded (building)	Clergy	Pop. served
Arreton (St George)	St George, Arreton		Medieval	1	940
Newchurch (All Saints)	All Saints, Newchurch		Medieval	1	2,397
Barton (St Paul)	St Paul, Barton		1844	0	5,184
Bembridge (Holy Trinity) (St Luke's Mission Church)	Holy Trinity, Bembridge		1827 (1846)	1	3,679
Bembridge (Holy Trinity) (St Luke's Mission Church)	St Luke's Chapel, Bembridge			1	3,679
Binstead (Holy Cross)	Holy Cross, Binstead		Medieval	1	4,490
Havenstreet (St Peter)	St Peter, Havenstreet		1852	1	491
Wootton (St Edmund)	St Edmund, Wootton		Medieval	1	3,653
Wootton (St Edmund)	St Mark, Wootton Bridge		1909	1	3,653
Bonchurch (St Boniface) (St Boniface Old Church)	St Boniface, Bonchurch		1848		568
Bonchurch (St Boniface) (St Boniface Old Church)	Old St Boniface, Bonchurch		Medieval		568
Ventnor (Holy Trinity)	Holy Trinity, Ventnor		1862		1,291
Ventnor (St Catherine)	St Catherine, Ventnor		1837		1,929
Wight, West, Comprising Brighstone, Brook, Calbourne, Freshwater, Mottistone, Newtown, Shalfleet, Shorwell with Kingston, Thorley, Totland Bay, and Yarmouth	St Mary, Brighstone		Medieval	2	1,357
Wight, West, Comprising Brighstone, Brook, Calbourne, Freshwater, Mottistone, Newtown, Shalfleet, Shorwell with Kingston, Thorley, Totland Bay, and Yarmouth	St Mary, Brook		Medieval (1864)	2	135
Wight, West, Comprising Brighstone, Brook, Calbourne, Freshwater, Mottistone, Newtown, Shalfleet, Shorwell with Kingston, Thorley, Totland Bay, and Yarmouth	SS Peter & Paul, Mottistone		Medieval	2	81
Wight, West, Comprising Brighstone, Brook, Calbourne, Freshwater, Mottistone, Newtown, Shalfleet, Shorwell with Kingston, Thorley, Totland Bay, and Yarmouth	St Peter, Shorwell		Medieval	2	659
Wight, West, Comprising Brighstone, Brook, Calbourne, Freshwater, Mottistone, Newtown, Shalfleet, Shorwell with Kingston, Thorley, Totland Bay, and Yarmouth	St James, Kingston (?)		Medieval (1892)	2	659
Wight, West, Comprising Brighstone, Brook, Calbourne, Freshwater, Mottistone, Newtown, Shalfleet, Shorwell with Kingston, Thorley, Totland Bay, and Yarmouth	All Saints, Calbourne		Medieval	2	355
Wight, West, Comprising Brighstone, Brook, Calbourne, Freshwater, Mottistone, Newtown, Shalfleet, Shorwell with Kingston, Thorley, Totland Bay, and Yarmouth	Holy Spirit, Newtown		1835	2	317
Wight, West, Comprising Brighstone, Brook, Calbourne, Freshwater, Mottistone, Newtown, Shalfleet, Shorwell with Kingston, Thorley, Totland Bay, and Yarmouth	St Michael the Archangel, Shalfleet		Medieval	2	1,573
Wight, West, Comprising Brighstone, Brook, Calbourne, Freshwater, Mottistone, Newtown, Shalfleet, Shorwell with Kingston, Thorley, Totland Bay, and Yarmouth	All Saints, Freshwater		Medieval	2	5,428
Wight, West, Comprising Brighstone, Brook, Calbourne, Freshwater, Mottistone, Newtown, Shalfleet, Shorwell with Kingston, Thorley, Totland Bay, and Yarmouth	St Agnes, Freshwater (?)		1908	2	5,428
Wight, West, Comprising Brighstone, Brook, Calbourne, Freshwater, Mottistone, Newtown, Shalfleet, Shorwell with Kingston, Thorley, Totland Bay, and Yarmouth	St James, Yarmouth		Medieval (c. 1626)	2	591
Wight, West, Comprising Brighstone, Brook, Calbourne, Freshwater, Mottistone, Newtown, Shalfleet, Shorwell with Kingston, Thorley, Totland Bay, and Yarmouth	St Swithun, Thorley		1871	2	274
Wight, West, Comprising Brighstone, Brook, Calbourne, Freshwater, Mottistone, Newtown, Shalfleet, Shorwell with Kingston, Thorley, Totland Bay, and Yarmouth	Christ Church, Totland Bay		1869 (1875)	2	2,868
Carisbrooke (St Mary the Virgin)	St Mary, Carisbrooke		Medieval	1	
Carisbrooke (St Nicholas in the Castle)	St Nicholas in Castro, Carisbrooke		Medieval (1904)	1	
Gatcombe (St Olave)	St Olave, Gatcombe		Medieval	1	

Benefice	Churches	Link	Clergy	Population served	Ref
Chale (St Andrew)	St Andrew, Chale		Rector: Nigel Porter	3,331	
St Lawrence (Old Church) (St Lawrence)	St Lawrence, St Lawrence		Rector: Nigel Porter	3,331	
Whitwell (St Mary and St Rhadegunde)	SS Mary & Radegund, Whitwell		Rector: Nigel Porter	3,331	
Niton (St John the Baptist)	St John the Baptist, Niton		Rector: Nigel Porter	3,331	
Cowes (Holy Trinity) (St Mary the Virgin)	Holy Trinity, Cowes		Vicar: Andrew Poppe	5,835	
Cowes (Holy Trinity) (St Mary the Virgin)	St Mary the Virgin, Cowes		Vicar: Andrew Poppe	5,835	
Gatten (St Paul)	St Paul, Gatten		Priest-in-Charge: Mark Williams; NSM (Sandown): Tony Richards	9,487	
Sandown (Christ Church)	Christ Church, Sandown		Priest-in-Charge: Mark Williams; NSM (Sandown): Tony Richards	9,487	
Godshill (All Saints)	All Saints, Godshill; St Alban the Martyr, Ventnor		Vicar: John Ryder; NSM: Corinne Smith	3,631	
Gurnard (All Saints) with Cowes St Faith	All Saints, Gurnard		Vicar/Rector: Amanda Collinson; Curate: Stephen Sutcliffe; NSM: Diana Netherway	9,405	
Northwood (St John the Baptist)	St John the Baptist, Northwood		Vicar/Rector: Amanda Collinson; Curate: Stephen Sutcliffe; NSM: Diana Netherway	9,405	
Lake (Good Shepherd)	Good Shepherd, Lake		Priest-in-Charge: David Lawrence-Marsh; NSM: Corinne Smith (see above)	5,271	
Shanklin (St Saviour On the Cliff)	St Saviour-on-the-Cliff, Shanklin		Priest-in-Charge: David Lawrence-Marsh; NSM: Corinne Smith (see above)	5,271	
Newport (St John the Baptist)	St John the Baptist, Newport		Priest-in-Charge: Alison Kerr; NSM: Janet Hallam; NSM: David Brown	5,790	
Newport (St Thomas)	SS Thomas Minster, Newport		Vicar: Kevin Arkell; NSM: Janet Hallam (see above)	5,666	
Ryde (All Saints)	All Saints, Ryde		Priest-in-Charge: Vacant	10,226	
Swanmore (St Michael and All Angels)	St Michael & All Angels, Swanmore		Priest-in-Charge: Vacant	10,226	
Ryde (St James) Proprietary Chapel	St James, Ryde		Curate-in-Charge: James Leggett	N/A	
Ryde (St John the Baptist) Oakfield and Holy Trinity	St John, Oakfield; Holy Trinity, Ryde		Priest-in-Charge: Sue Theobald	10,501	
Sandown, Lower (St John the Evangelist)	St John the Evangelist, Sandown		Priest-in-Charge: Vacant; Curate: Jonathan Hall; NSM (Sandown): Tony Richards (see above)	6,189	
Shanklin (St Blasius)	St Blasius, Shanklin		Priest-in-Charge: Vacant; Curate: Jonathan Hall; NSM (Sandown): Tony Richards (see above)	6,189	
Seaview (St Peter), St Helens, Brading and Yaverland	St Peter, Seaview; St Helen, St Helens; St Catherine's Chapel, St Helens; St Mary, Brading; St John the Baptist, Yaverland		Rector: Alison Morley	6,148	
Whippingham (St Mildred) with East Cowes	St Mildred, Whippingham; St James, East Cowes		Rector: Susan Paterson	8,439	
Wroxall (St John the Evangelist)	St John the Evangelist, Wroxall		Hon. Priest-in-Charge: Vacant	1,724	

=== Deanery of Bishop's Waltham ===
Benefice	Churches	Link	Clergy	Population served	Ref
Bishop's Waltham (St Peter)	St Peter, Bishop's Waltham		Rector: James Hunt; NSM: Jane Beloe; NSM: Keith Wickert	7,324	
Upham (All Saints) (Blessed Mary of Upham)	Blessed Mary of Upham, Upham		Rector: James Hunt; NSM: Jane Beloe; NSM: Keith Wickert	7,324	
Botley (All Saints)	All Saints, Botley		Rector: Gregg Mensingh	6,371	
Curdridge (St Peter)	St Peter, Curdridge		Rector: Gregg Mensingh	6,371	
Durley (Holy Cross)	Holy Cross, Durley		Rector: Gregg Mensingh	6,371	
Meon Bridge, Comprising Droxford, Exton, and Meonstoke with Corhampton	St Mary & All Saints, Droxford; SS Peter & Paul, Exton; Corhampton Church; St Andrew, Meonstoke		Rector: Antony Forrest; Curate: Samantha Martell	1,739	
Shedfield (St John the Baptist) and Wickham	St John the Baptist, Shedfield		Rector: Jane Isaac; NSM: Brian McHugh; Hon. Curate: Juliet Montague	6,308	
Shedfield (St John the Baptist) and Wickham	St Nicholas, Wickham		Rector: Jane Isaac; NSM: Brian McHugh; Hon. Curate: Juliet Montague	6,308	
Soberton (St Peter), Newtown and Hambledon	SS Peter & Paul, Hambledon		Priest-in-Charge: Vacant	2,715	
Soberton (St Peter), Newtown and Hambledon	St Peter, Soberton; Holy Trinity, Newtown		Priest-in-Charge: Vacant	2,715	
Southwick (St James) with Boarhunt	St James, Southwick; St Nicholas, Boarhunt		Priest-in-Charge: Simon Brocklehurst	1,456	
Swanmore (St Barnabas)	St Barnabas, Swanmore		Vicar: Claire Towns	2,931	

=== Deanery of Fareham ===
Benefice	Churches	Link	Clergy	Population served	Ref
Crofton (Holy Rood) (St Edmund)	Holy Rood, Crofton; St Edmund, Crofton		Vicar: Richard England; Curate: Judith Greenfield; Curate: Dan Greenfield; NSM: Colin Prestidge	14,947	
Fareham (Holy Trinity) (St Columba)	Holy Trinity, Fareham; St Columba, Fareham		Team Rector: Sally Davenport; Curate: Wendy May Jacobs	19,250	
Fareham (St John the Evangelist)	St John the Evangelist, Fareham		Priest-in-Charge: Bruce Deans	9,746	
Fareham (St Peter and St Paul)	SS Peter & Paul, Fareham; St Francis, Funtley		Priest-in-Charge: Roger Jackson	14,251	
Hook (St Mary) with Warsash	St Mary, Warsash		Vicars (NSM): Mike and Nicky-Sue Terry	9,843	
Locks Heath (St John the Baptist)	St John the Baptist, Locks Heath		Vicar: Gavin Foster; Curate: Amy Webb	11,658	
Portchester (St Mary)	St Mary, Portchester		Priest-in-Charge: Ian Meredith	15,618	
Sarisbury (St Paul)	St Paul, Sarisbury Green		Vicar/Priest-in-Charge: Sandy Matheson; Curate-in-Charge (Whiteley): Philippa Mills; Minister (Whiteley): Amy Adeniran	12,585	
Whiteley Conventional District	Whiteley Church		Vicar/Priest-in-Charge: Sandy Matheson; Curate-in-Charge (Whiteley): Philippa Mills; Minister (Whiteley): Amy Adeniran	12,585	
Titchfield (St Peter)	St Peter, Titchfield		Priest-in-Charge: Susan Allman; NSM: Janet Trevithick	9,956	

=== Deanery of Gosport ===
Benefice	Churches	Link	Clergy	Population served	Ref
Alverstoke (St Faith) (St Francis) (St Mary)	St Mary, Alverstoke; St Faith, Alverstoke; St Francis, Alverstoke		Priest-in-Charge: Andrew Norris; Curate: Chris Richardson	16,532	
Bridgemary (St Matthew)	St Matthew, Bridgemary		Vicar: Karen Mitchell; NSM (Elson): Margaret Hay	19,046	
Elson (St Thomas)	St Thomas the Apostle, Elson		Vicar: Karen Mitchell; NSM (Elson): Margaret Hay	19,046	
Forton (St John the Evangelist)	St John the Evangelist, Forton		Vicar: Carrie Thompson	12,473	
Gosport (Christ Church)	Christ Church, Gosport		Priest-in-Charge: Ray Driscoll; Priest: Godfrey Chigumira	8,399	
Gosport (Holy Trinity)	Holy Trinity, Gosport		Priest-in-Charge: Ray Driscoll; Priest: Godfrey Chigumira	8,399	
Lee-On-The-Solent (St Faith)	St Faith, Lee-on-the-Solent		Priest-in-Charge: Paul Chamberlain; Curate: Mary Kells; NSM: Brian Williams; NSM: Steve Dent	10,863	
Rowner (St Mary the Virgin)	St Mary the Virgin, Rowner		Rector: John Draper	15,312	

=== Deanery of Petersfield ===
Benefice	Churches	Link	Clergy	Population served	Ref
Blackmoor (St Matthew) and Whitehill	St Matthew, Blackmoor		Vicar: Alice Wood; Vicar: Dominic Clarke	4,484	
Greatham (St John the Baptist)	St John the Baptist, Greatham		Vicar: Alice Wood; Vicar: Dominic Clarke	4,484	
Bramshott (St Mary the Virgin) and Liphook	St Mary the Virgin, Bramshott; Liphook Church Centre		Priest-in-Charge: Valentine Inglis-Jones	8,514	
Petersfield (St Peter)	St Peter, Petersfield		Rector: Will Hughes; Curate: Samantha Cullen; NSM (Buriton): Judith Bee; NSM (Petersfield): Helen Mitchell	11,125	
Buriton (St Mary the Virgin)	St Mary the Virgin, Buriton		Rector: Will Hughes; Curate: Samantha Cullen; NSM (Buriton): Judith Bee; NSM (Petersfield): Helen Mitchell	11,125	
Empshott (Holy Rood) and Hawkley with Priors Dean	Holy Rood, Empshott; SS Peter & Paul, Hawkley; Priors Dean Parish Church		Priest-in-Charge: Peter Sutton	525	
Langrish (St John the Evangelist)	St John the Evangelist, Langrish		Vicar/Curate: Jane Ball; Curate: Katy Garner	2,520	
Meon, East (All Saints)	All Saints, East Meon		Vicar/Curate: Jane Ball; Curate: Katy Garner	2,520	
Meon, West (St John the Evangelist) and Warnford	St John the Evangelist, West Meon; Our Lady, Warnford		Vicar/Curate: Jane Ball; Curate: Katy Garner	2,520	
Liss (St Mary) (St Peter) (St Saviour)	St Mary, Liss; St Saviour, Liss (?)		Rector: Chris Williams; Curate: Richard Hutchins	6,349	
Sheet (St Mary Magdalene)	St Mary Magdalene, Sheet		Vicar: Richard Saunders; NSM: Anderson Marsh; NSM: Peter Micklethwaite	4,691	
Steep (All Saints) and Froxfield with Privett	All Saints, Steep; Stroud Mission Church; St Peter, Froxfield; St Peter, Froxfield Green		Vicar: John Owen; NSM: Christine Prior-Jones; NSM: Susie Collingridge	2,600	

== See also ==
- Roman Catholic Diocese of Portsmouth
