= Church of St Saviour-on-the-Cliff, Shanklin =

Church on the Isle of Wight, England

Coordinates: 50°37′43.81″N 01°10′29.4″W

The Church of St. Saviour-on-the-Cliff, Shanklin
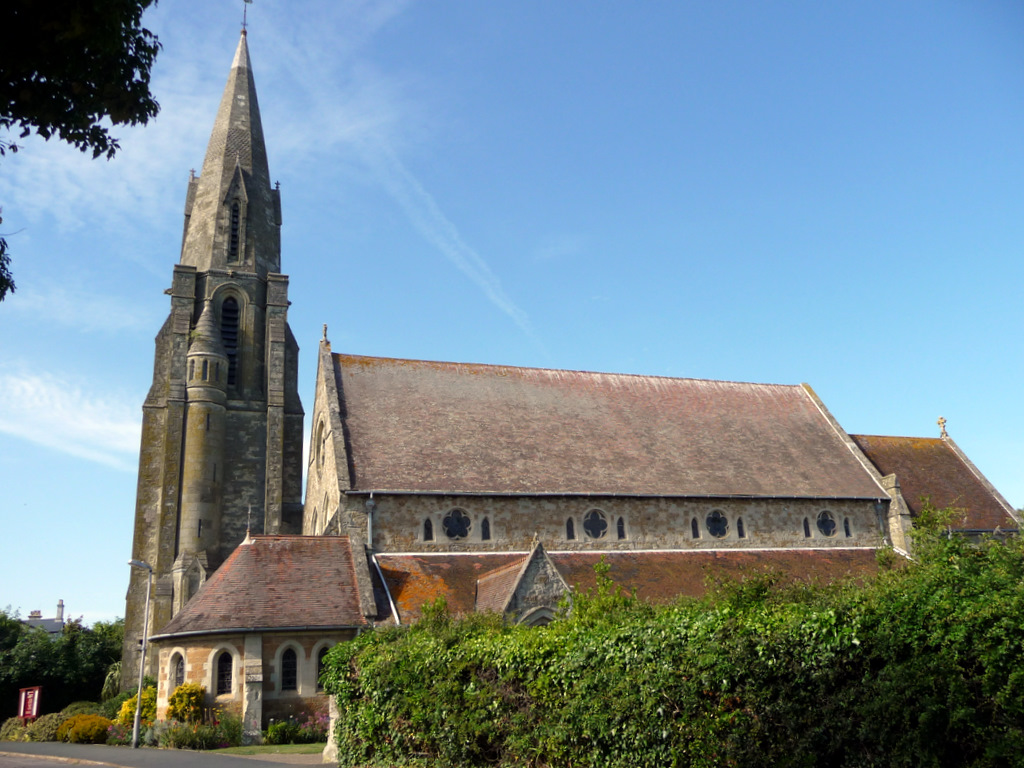
- The Church of St. Saviour-on-the-Cliff, Shanklin
- Denomination: Church of England
- Churchmanship: Anglo-Catholic

History
- Dedication: St. Saviour

Administration
- Province: Canterbury
- Diocese: Portsmouth
- Archdeaconry: Isle of Wight
- Deanery: East Wight Deanery
- Parish: Shanklin

Clergy
- Bishop: The Rt Revd Norman Banks (AEO)
- Priest(s): Fr David Lawrence-March, Fr John Davies

The Church of St. Saviour-on-the-Cliff, Shanklin is a Grade II Listed parish church in the Church of England located in Shanklin, Isle of Wight.

== History ==
The church dates from 1869 to 1905 and was designed by the architect Thomas Hellyer.

The Foundation stone was laid on Ascension Day 1867.

The first phase comprising the Nave, Chancel, Vestry, and Organ Chamber was completed at a cost of £2,789. Bishop Vincent William Ryan, the first Bishop of Mauritius, consecrated it on 7 May 1869.

The present Pulpit dates from 1903 and was designed and carved by Miss Editha Plowden. The original pulpit was taken to St John's Church, Bournemouth where it can still be seen today.

The South aisle and Porch were added in 1871 and the North aisle and Church Hall in 1876. The Baptistry and the proposed Narthex in 1883 were added in 1905 and was the last of the major building work to take place.

The church, rather surprisingly, survived the war years with only a few windows being damaged. The damage to these windows can still be seen in the East window of the Memorial Chapel and the West windows at the back of the church. Damage to one of the Baptistry windows is also visible.

The Chancel Arch contains the only example of Victorian painted text work in the church. " Draw near with a true heart in full assurance of faith" (Hebrews 10 22).

The true glory of St Saviour's can be seen on the interior, which has been richly and generously furnished over the years. The full scale of Hellyer's church in the Early English style can be appreciated by standing at the entrance to the Galilee Porch and looking towards the High Altar.

== The tower and bells ==
In 1883 the Vicar, the Revd Charles I Burland, announced that it was proposed to complete St Saviours by the addition of "a heaven-pointing Tower with its suitable furniture of pealing bells" By early 1887 the tower and spire were completed and the peal of eight bells was installed the following year. The bells were manufactured by Mears and Stainbank of Whitechapel of London. Their total weight is some 75 cwt, with the Tenor alone weighing 18 cwt. The initial optimism which greeted this project has not been sustained. By 1900 the tower and spire were shrouded in scaffolding to enable repairs to take place. The bells were hung too high, and this, along with the unsteady structure, led to the bells being chimed rather than rung from 1925 to 1985. In 1985 the pinnacles were removed at the junction of the tower, and following a structural report that the tower was indeed safe, much hard work started clearing sixty years of debris. By the 1980s the bells were in a very sorry state. They had hung still in a salt-laden air for a century. No less than 56 bags of pigeon guano were removed from the tower, and it was obvious that if the bells were to have a long-term future, a lot of hard work would have to be done. After 8 years of tireless fundraising, the bells were taken out of the tower to be restored with brand new headstocks, stays, wheels, clappers, pulleys and ball but hung in original frame.

== Organ ==
The pipe organ dates from 1874 by the builder J. W. Walker & Sons Ltd. The organ is located in the chancel to the north side. It also has two keyboard manuals and 4 composite pedals. A specification of the organ can be found on the National Pipe Organ Register.
