= Thomas Hellyer (architect) =

English architect

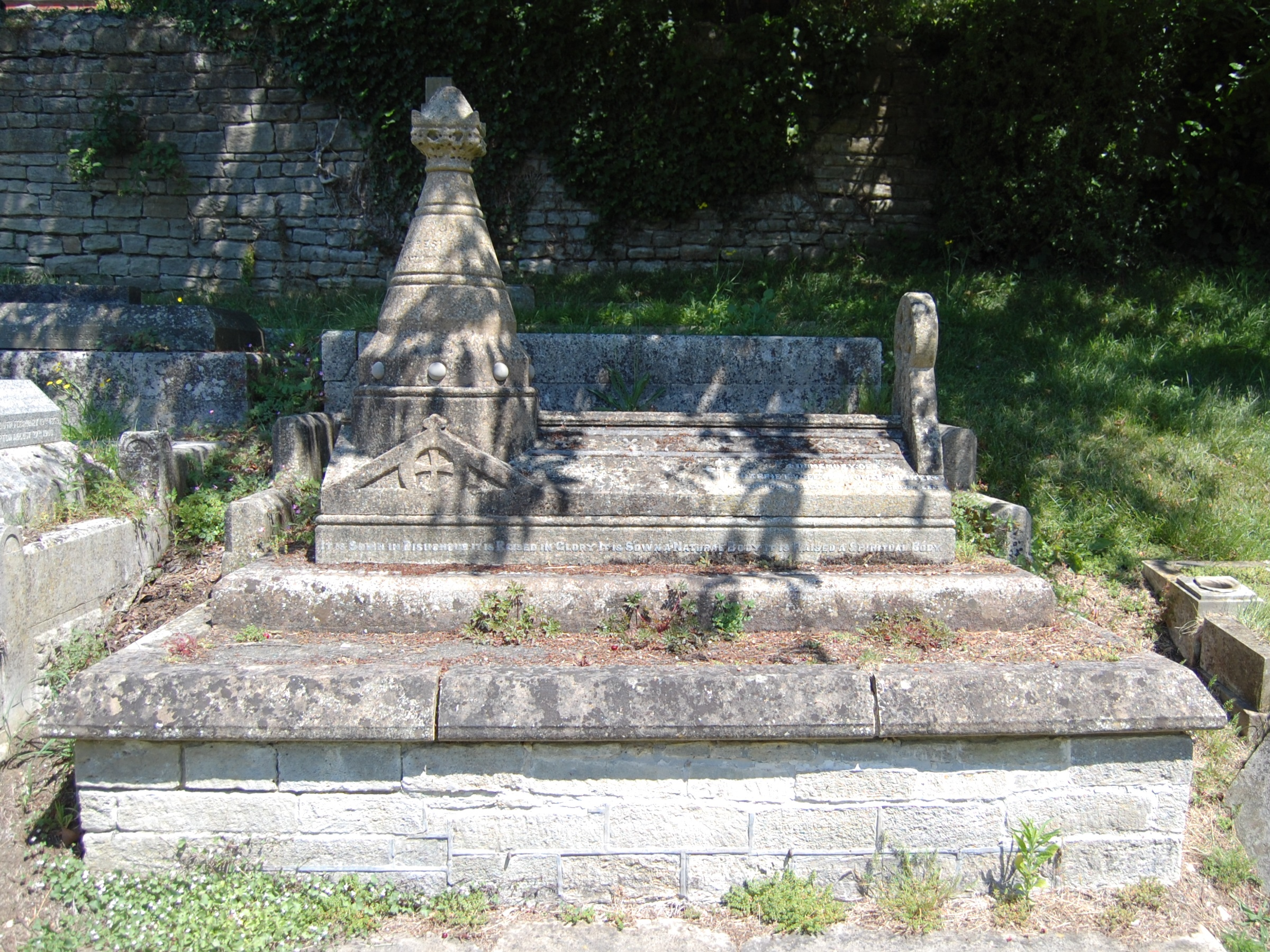
The grave of Thomas Hellyer in Ryde Cemetery

Thomas Hellyer (1811–18 March 1894) was an English architect of the mid-Victorian era. He was based on the Isle of Wight and was "the leading Island-based architect of the period." His works can also be found on the mainland—principally in Hampshire, but also further afield. Described by Pevsner as a "very individualistic" and "remarkable" architect, his output included churches, houses, schools and hospitals across the island, built during a period of rapid urban development. Many of his buildings have listed status and he "made important contributions to the appearance of the city" of Portsmouth through his extensive work in the area.

== Biography ==
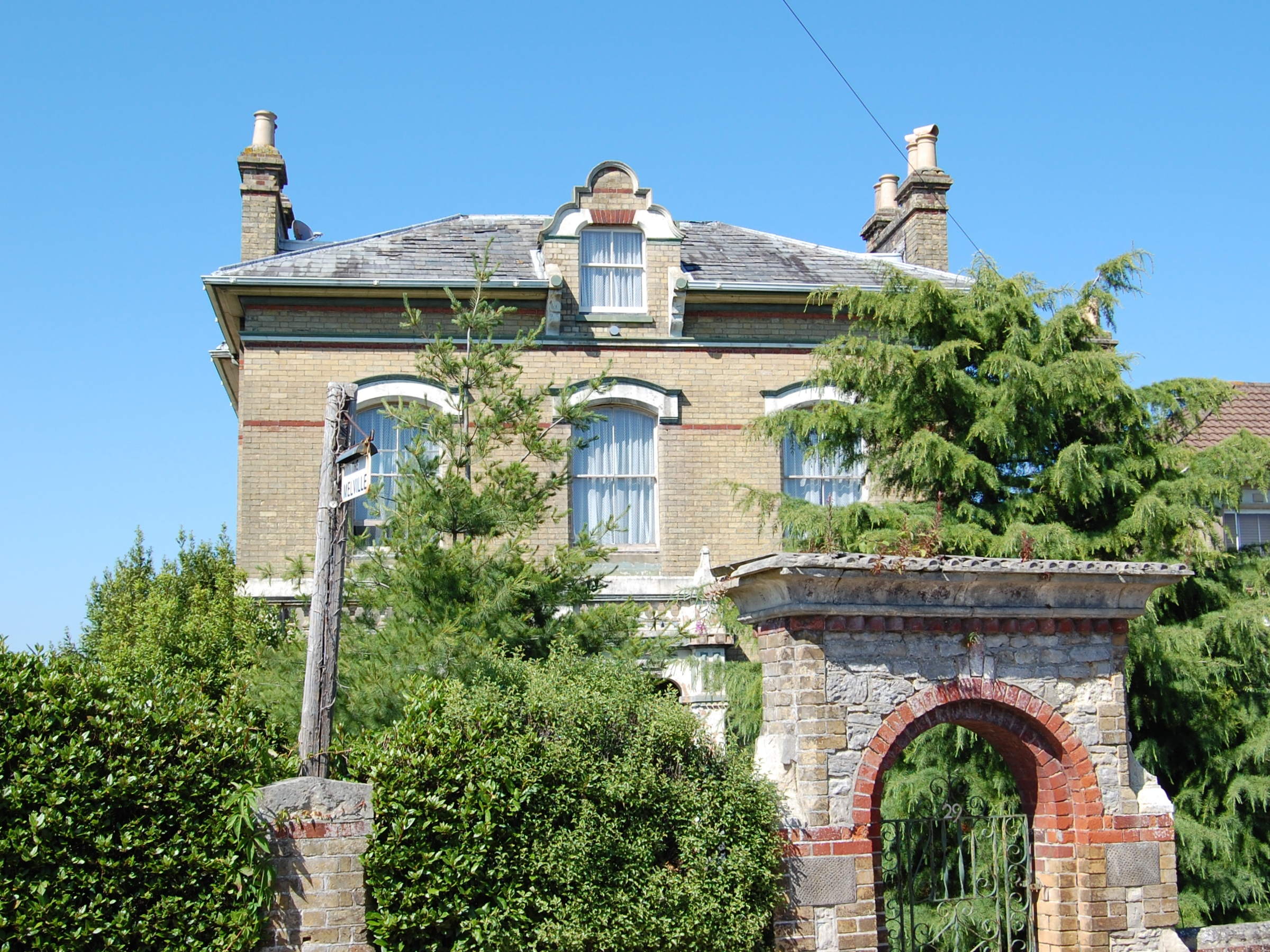
Hellyer designed 29 Melville Street, Ryde, as his family home in 1855

Thomas Hellyer was born in Emsworth, a Hampshire village close to the Sussex border, in 1811. He was married to Harriet, originally from Portsea, and they had one daughter, also called Harriet. His wife predeceased him.

Much of Hellyer's early architectural work involved church design and restoration on the Isle of Wight, where he was active as an architect by 1839. Ryde's rapid growth in the early to mid-nineteenth century led to suburban expansion, and between 1841 and 1843 Hellyer worked on the design of a new church dedicated to St. John to serve the eastern suburbs of Oakfield, Elmfield and St John's Park. The cruciform church was extended with south and north aisles in 1864 and 1879, again to Hellyer's design. He also worked on the design of the St. John's Park estate over several years from 1854. Hellyer designed the layout of the roads and central open space in the high-class suburb surrounding the church; he also may have worked on some of the villas surrounding the park.

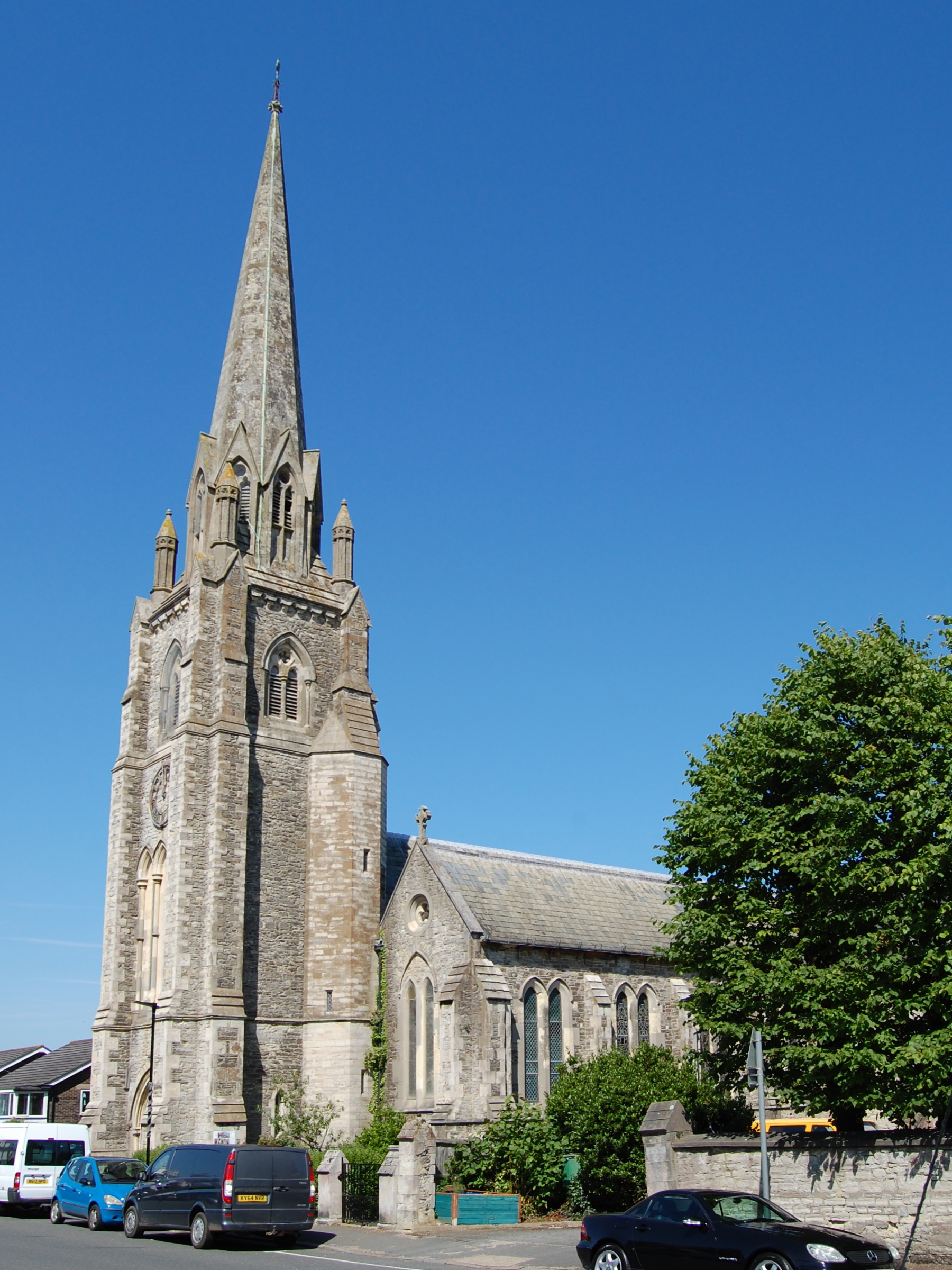
Hellyer's Holy Trinity Church (1841–1846) has a landmark spire.

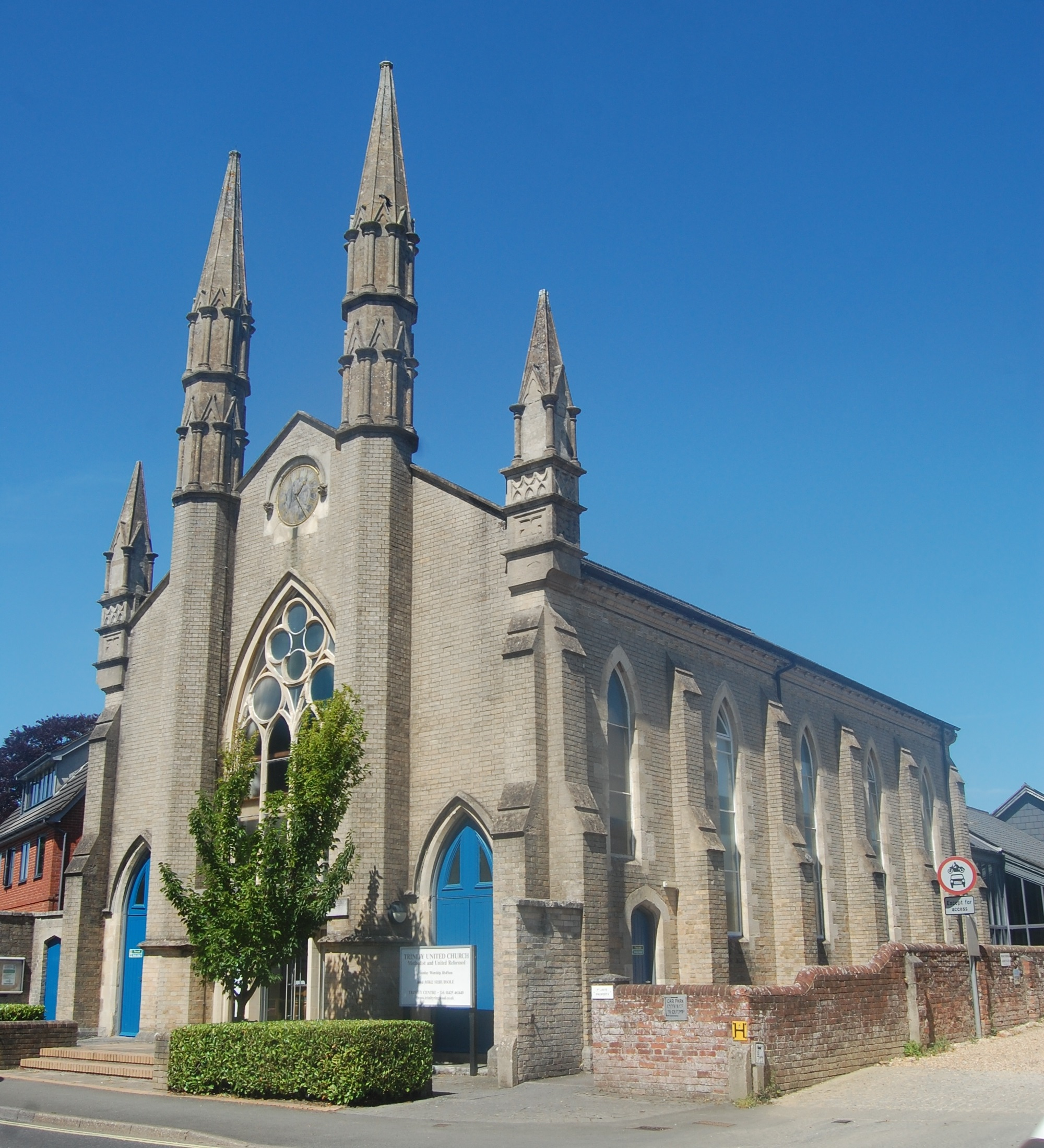
The Congregational church (now Trinity United Reformed and Methodist Church) in Ringwood dates from 1866.

In 1844, he was commissioned to design two churches on the mainland: St. James's Church in the village of Seacroft near Leeds in Yorkshire, a Gothic Revival building that opened in 1845, and St. Paul's Church at Ashford Hill near Kingsclere in Hampshire. This also was completed in 1845. Between 1845 and 1846, he worked on rebuilding and restoring the parish churches of the Isle of Wight villages of Bembridge and Binstead.

Throughout this period he worked on the design of a large new Anglican church in Ryde, Holy Trinity. He started work on it in 1841, but most of the design and construction took place between 1844 and 1846 and work did not finish until 1860. The "delicate" landmark spire, visible for miles, is a "masterpiece" of unusual and distinctive form. The church, now closed and converted into a community centre, is Grade II-listed. He then returned to Kingsclere to design a parsonage and a vicarage and to restore and substantially extend the Norman-era St. Mary's Church, all between 1846 and 1850.

Over the next decade, Hellyer designed three new churches: at Havenstreet (1852) and Seaview (1859), villages near Ryde, and St. Luke's Church in the Southsea area of Portsmouth. Work on this building started in 1855, but it was left incomplete for several years and only opened in 1861. At this time he was engaged in rebuilding work at St. Mary's Church in Thatcham, Berkshire, and designing buildings at Laverstoke Mill in Hampshire. The 1860s saw Hellyer design two Nonconformist chapels on the mainland: one for Wesleyans in Deal, Kent (built in 1864, but no longer extant) (Note: Chronology of major works by Thomas Hellyer incorrectly marks this as a Grade II-listed building.) and a Congregational chapel in Ringwood, Hampshire (1866). In the same year he designed his second church in Southsea, dedicated to St. Simon. Both of these are Grade II-listed, as are St. Peter's at Havenstreet and St. Peter's at Seaview. Both are small Gothic Revival-style stone chapels with narrow lancet windows (a characteristic feature of Hellyer's churches); Seaview has been enlarged several times and has lost its spire, but much of Hellyer's work survives, and Havenstreet (where he also designed a parsonage) has a distinctively steep roof topped with a bell-cot. In Ryde during this decade, he altered Westfield Park House, a large villa of 1811, on behalf of its new owner Augustus Clifford—his work included the combined porch and tower at the front, "evoking Osborne House"— and he designed a National school on Green Street (1856–57). This Gothic Revival building has mullioned windows and symmetrical gabled bays; it is no longer in educational use.

Hellyer's next works were also on the Isle of Wight. On the road between Ryde and Appley he designed Sturbridge House in 1861–62 as a private house, again with a central tower reminiscent of Osborne House. The building is now a hotel called Appley Manor Hotel. After this he restored St. Mary's Church in Brading between 1864 and 1866 and designed a parsonage there, rebuilt St. James's Church at East Cowes in 1868, and built the first sections of the Church of St. Saviour-on-the-Cliff, Shanklin (the nave and chancel in 1869 and the south aisle in 1871), although the building was finished by other architects. Over the other side of the Solent he worked on Holy Trinity Church, Gosport in 1867, where he oversaw the re-pewing of the church, a new altar and formation of a chancel.

There followed his major work of the 1870s: he built the National Hospital of Diseases of the Chest at Ventnor over a period of approximately ten years from 1869. This institution was founded by Arthur Hill Hassall. Princess Louise, Duchess of Argyll, laid the foundation stone of these Hellyer buildings, which were designed in the Tudor Revival style using local stone. They consisted of a line of eight blocks accommodating twelve patients each and flanking a central chapel. Later, the hospital was extended by other architects. After closure in 1964 it fell into dereliction before being demolished in 1969. The Ventnor Botanic Garden now occupies the site. Hellyer also worked on several buildings in Portsmouth during the 1970s. He designed two schools in 1872–73: Grove Middle School in Southsea, for which his design was chosen from about 40 submitted to the local school board, and another (now in residential use) on New Road in Fratton. His Royal Naval Club of 1875 in Southsea still stands and is Grade II-listed.

Hellyer undertook a lot of work at the Royal Isle of Wight County Hospital in Ryde, of which he was Honorary Architect and Life Governor. Planning for this facility started in 1845 and he designed the first section—a ward with 20 beds—in 1848. It opened on 9 November 1849 and was first extended in 1852 when Hellyer built a laundry and an outpatients building. He enlarged the original ward in 1864, and in 1874 designed a children's ward after a benefactor offered money for this purpose. Six years later a resident offered £5,500 for the construction of a convalescent home within the hospital grounds as a memorial to her parents, and Hellyer designed the Milligan Block, also known as the Milligan Convalescent Home. The hospital closed in 1992 and all the buildings were demolished soon afterward. His last work for which a date is known was a school at the top of St. John's Road in Ryde, built in 1883 and now used as a community centre. Like his school at nearby Green Street, it has mullioned windows and tall gabled bays. Another of his later works in Ryde, although the date is not known, was Appley Towers. This was a "fine mock Elizabethan mansion" occupied by the Hutt family and later by Sir Hedworth Williamson, 8th Baronet's son, the 9th Baronet Williamson. A lodge, folly (also designed by Hellyer c. 1875), and other associated buildings remain, but the house has been demolished.

Hellyer was closely involved in civic life in Ryde and "took great interest in town affairs". He served as the honorary secretary of the Ryde School of Art on George Street. He also was involved in honorary and administrative capacities in the hospitals he worked on: he served as Ryde Hospital's honorary architect and on the management board of Ventnor Royal National Hospital. He undertook similar duties on the island's Burial Board and Cemetery Committee, and was elected to the Ryde Commissioners in 1854. Away from architecture he was involved in the development of sewerage in the parish of St. Helens in 1875.

Hellyer designed and built a house for his family on Melville Street in Ryde in 1855. The "unusual" three-bay villa is of pale brown brick "embellished in idiosyncratic ways" with multicoloured brickwork and stucco dressings. Much of its "lavish" interior decoration survives. It is a Grade II listed building.

Initially, his architectural practice was based at nearby Cross Street in the town centre, but by 1878 it was based nearby at George Street. By that date he had moved home to 42 Queen's Road in Ryde. He died there on 18 March 1894, aged 82, and was buried in Ryde Cemetery in the same grave as his wife. The grave was restored in 2005 and 2009, revealing its intricate design and inscriptions.

=== Associated architects ===
Robert Jewell Withers was articled to Hellyer in 1839. Hellyer's specialism in ecclesiastical architecture influenced Withers' career: he went on to work on nearly 100 churches in Britain and Europe. Also articled to Hellyer were Augustus Laver, whose four-year apprenticeship in Ryde was followed by a career in the United States and Canada, and George Alexander Wright, who became a prominent architect in San Francisco after a four-year stint (1881–85) in Hellyer's office.

== Gallery ==
Churches on the Isle of Wight and elsewhere
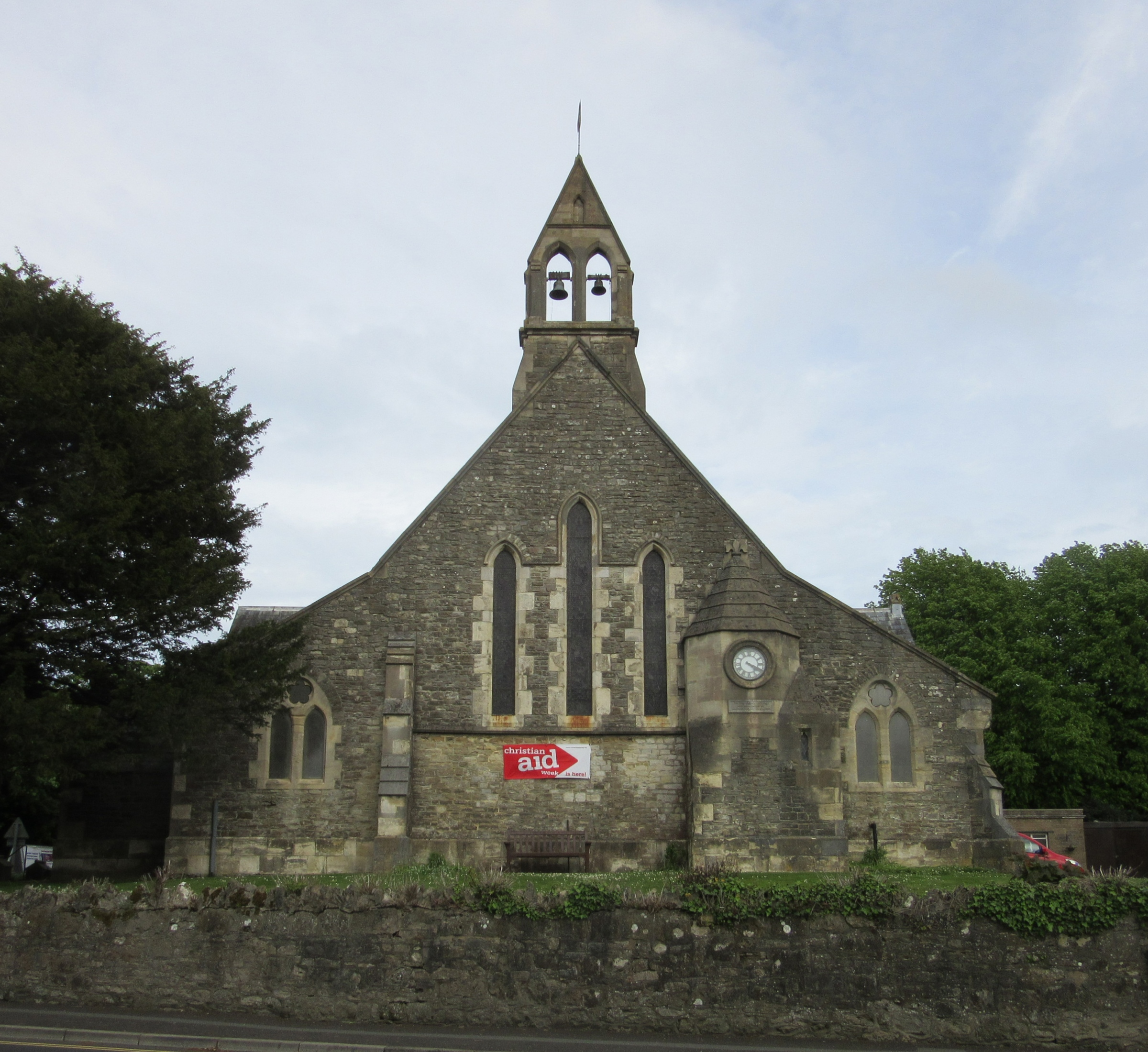
St. John's Church, Oakfield, Ryde

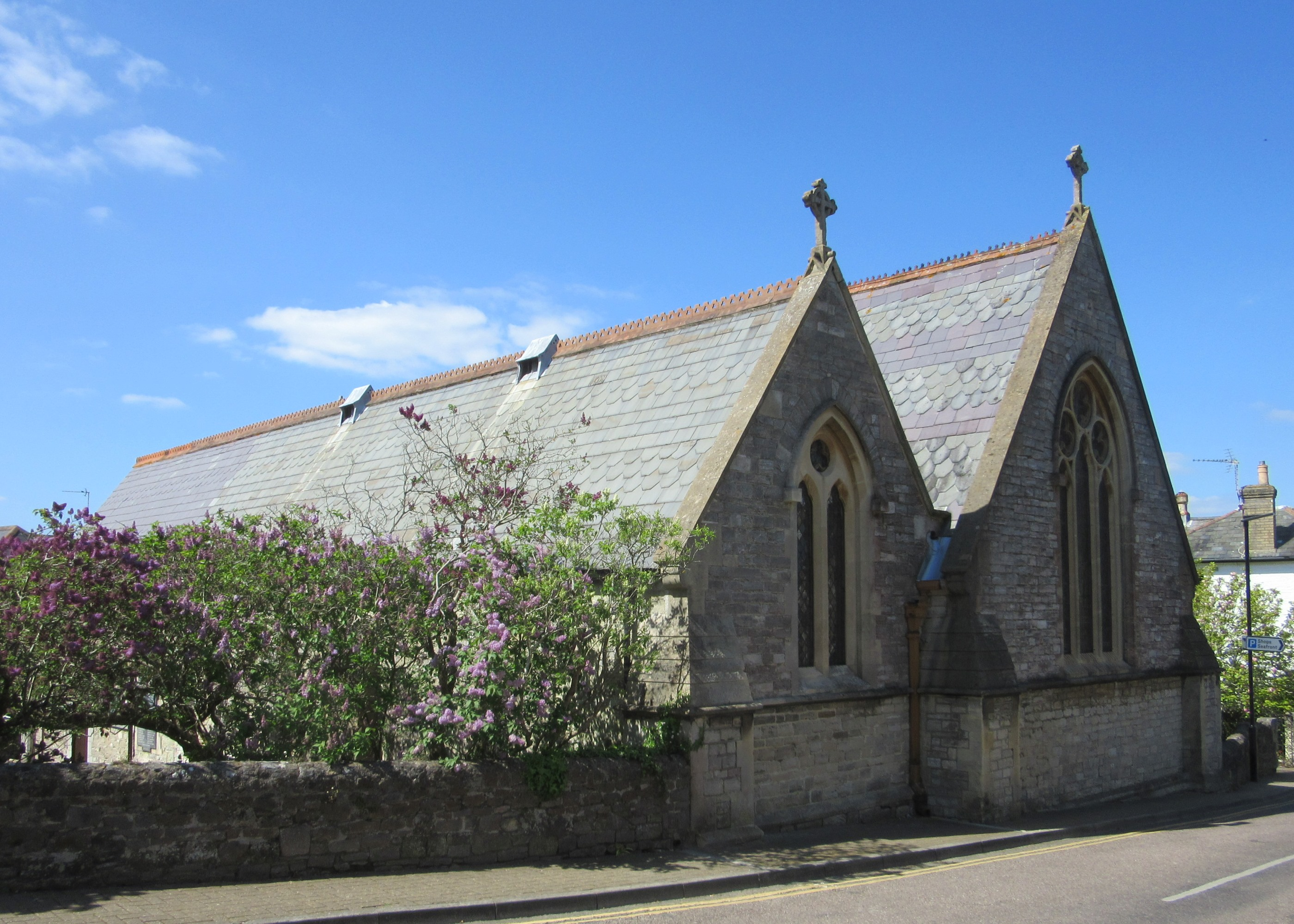
St. Peter's Church, Seaview

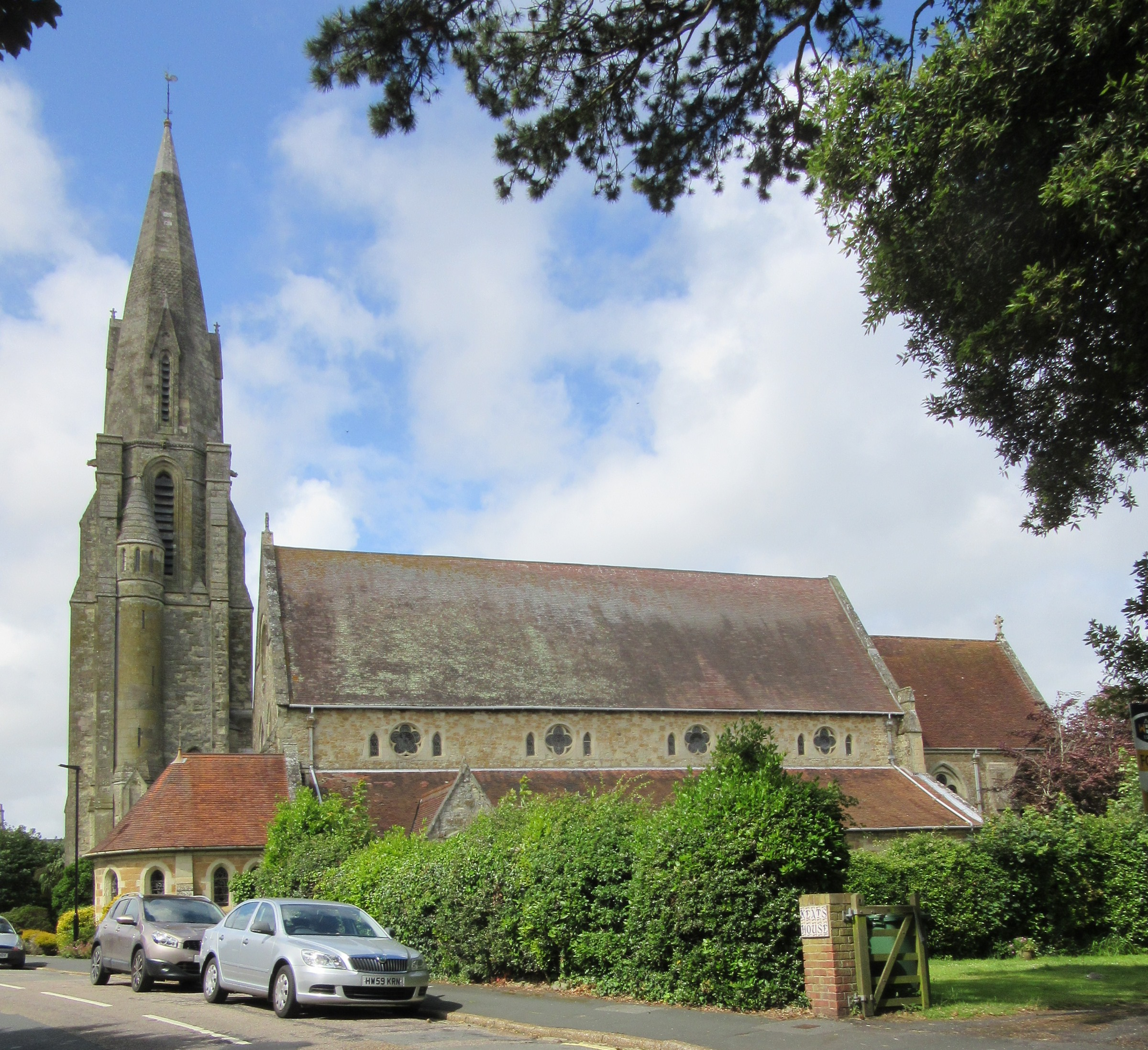
Church of St. Saviour-on-the-Cliff, Shanklin

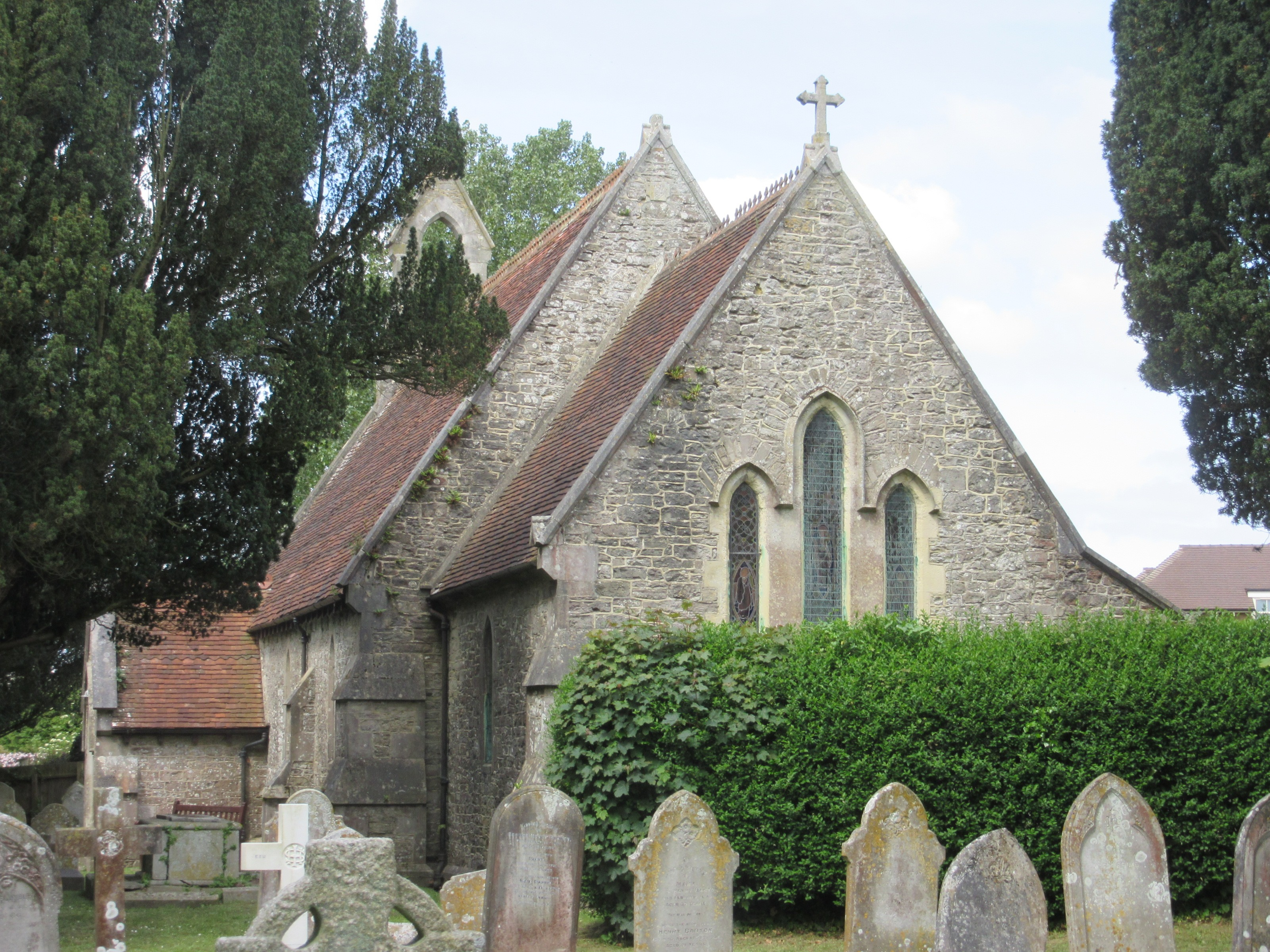
St. Peter's Church, Havenstreet

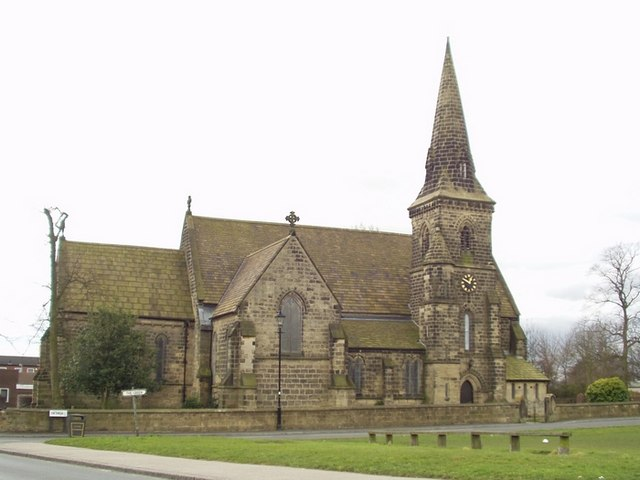
St. James's Church, Seacroft

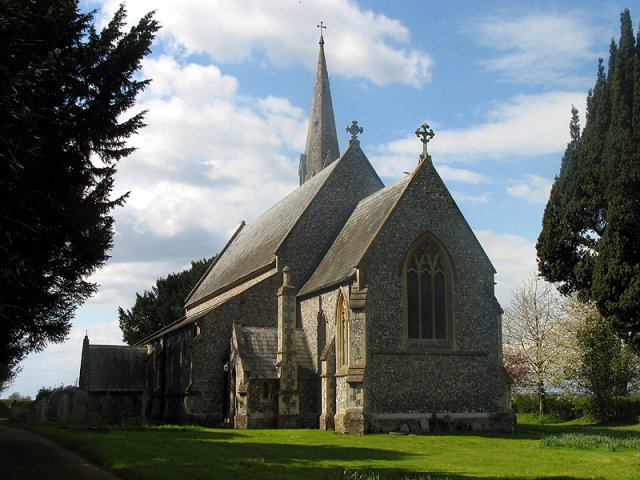
St. Paul's Church, Ashford Hill

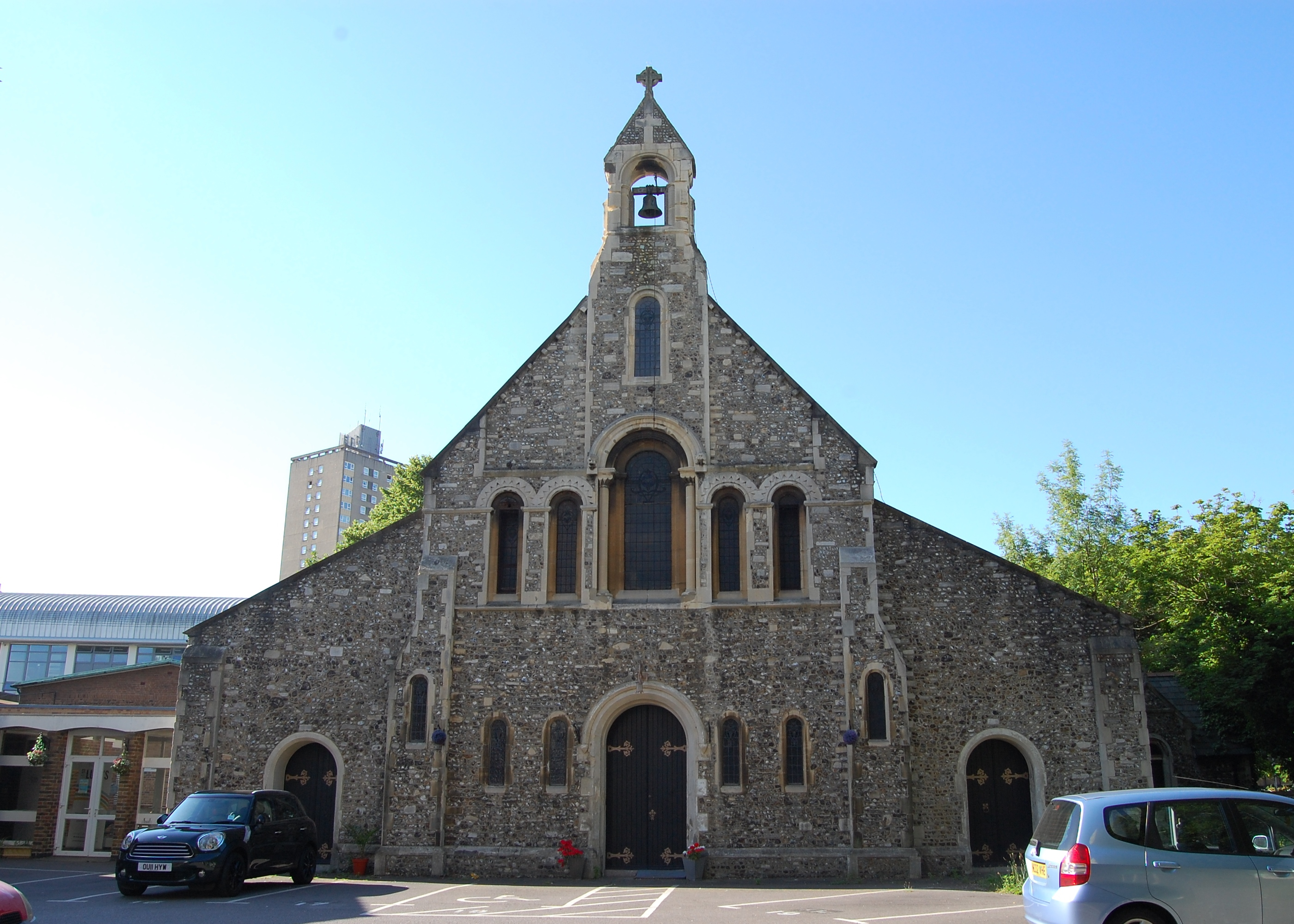
St. Luke's Church, Southsea

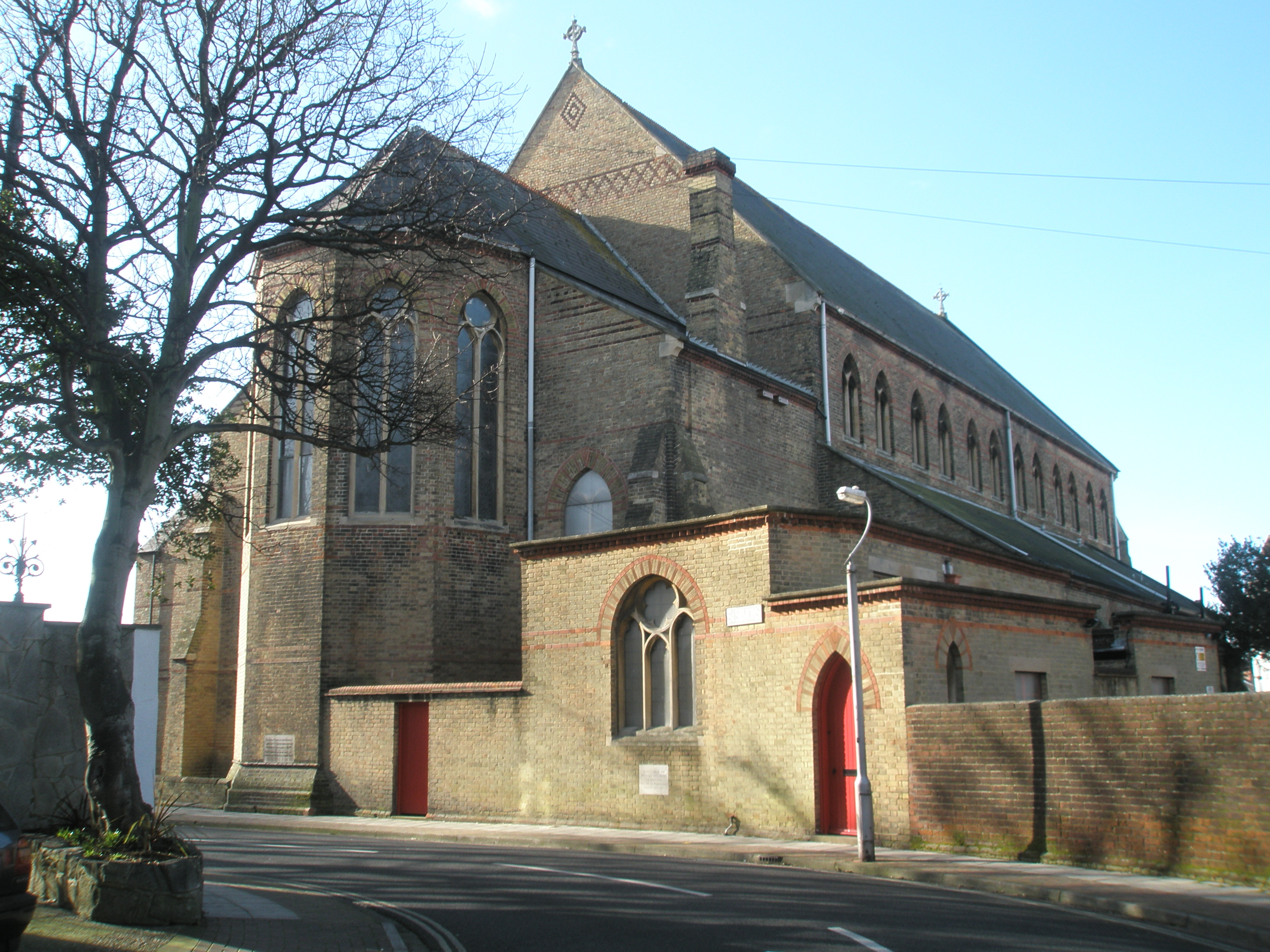
St. Simon's Church, Southsea
Other works
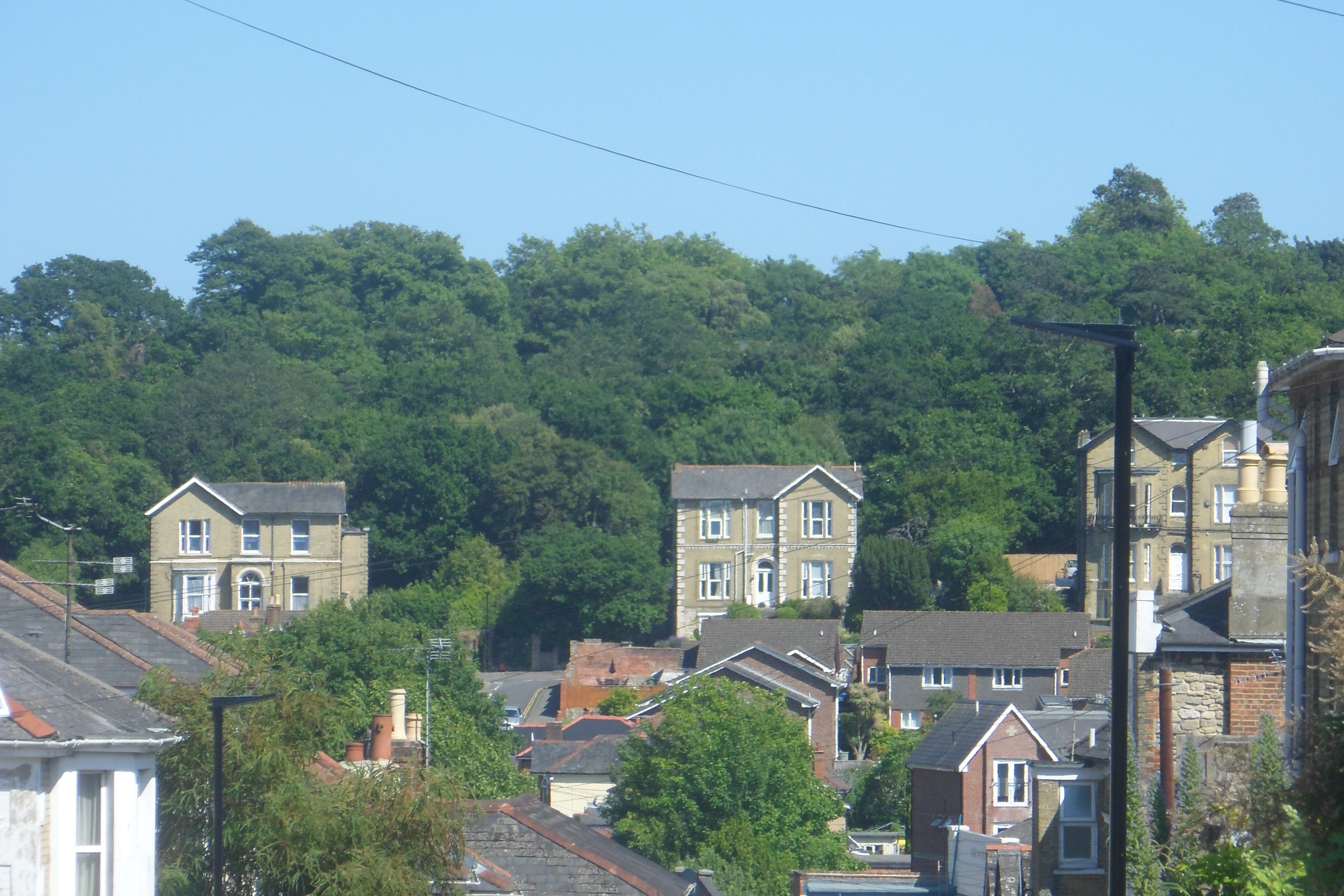
St John's Park Estate, Ryde

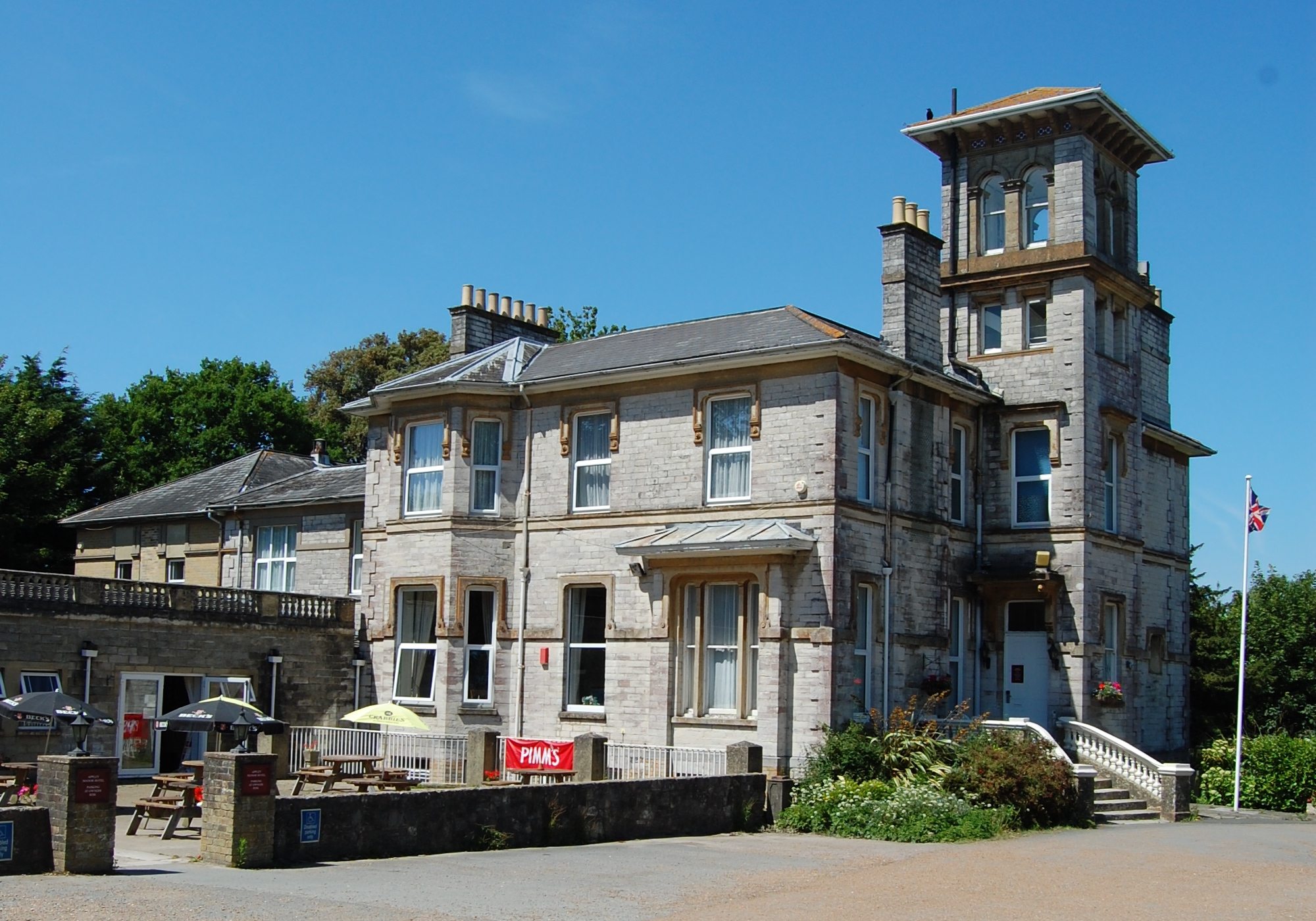
Appley Manor Hotel, Appley

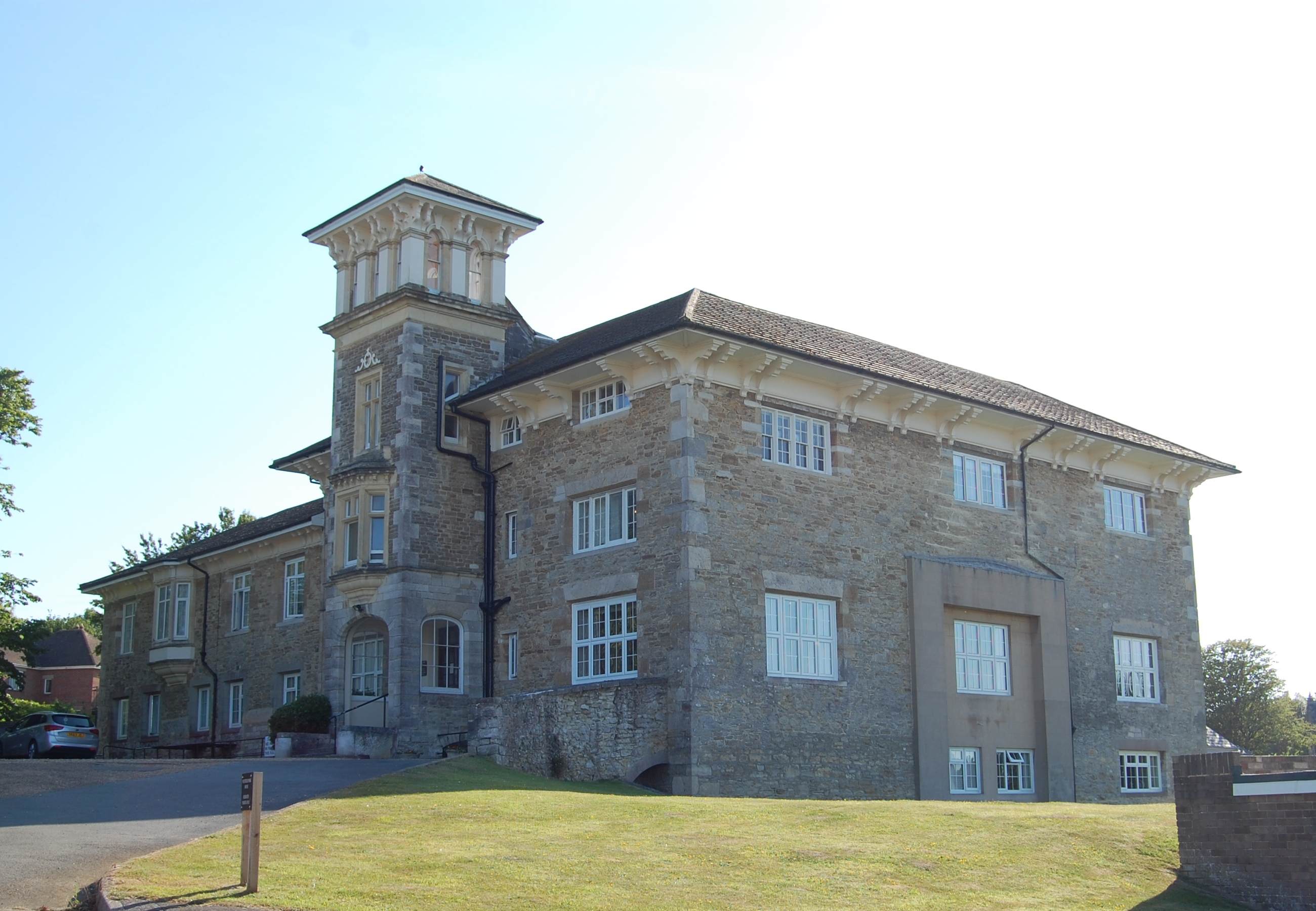
Westfield Park House, Ryde

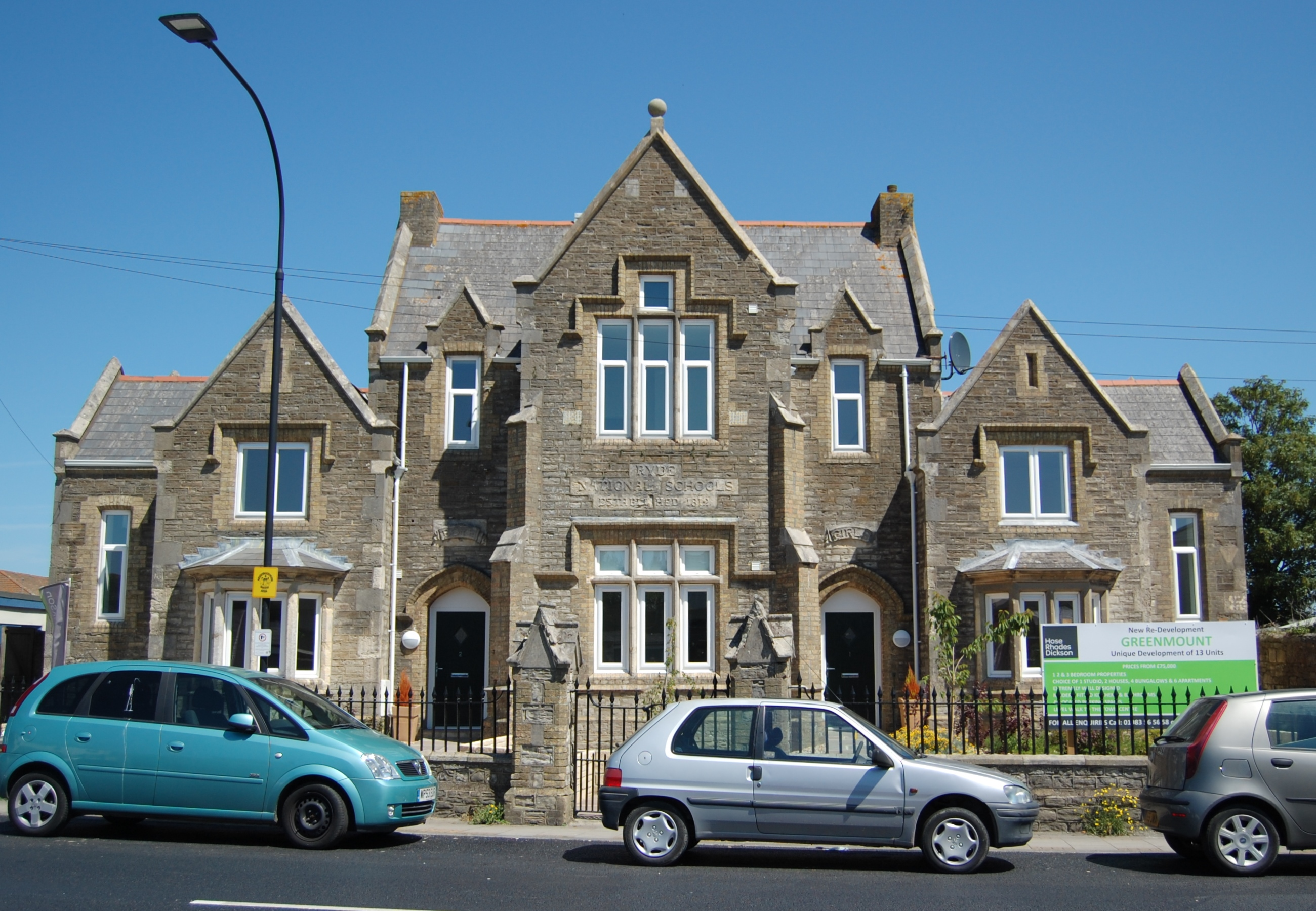
Former National School, Green Street, Ryde

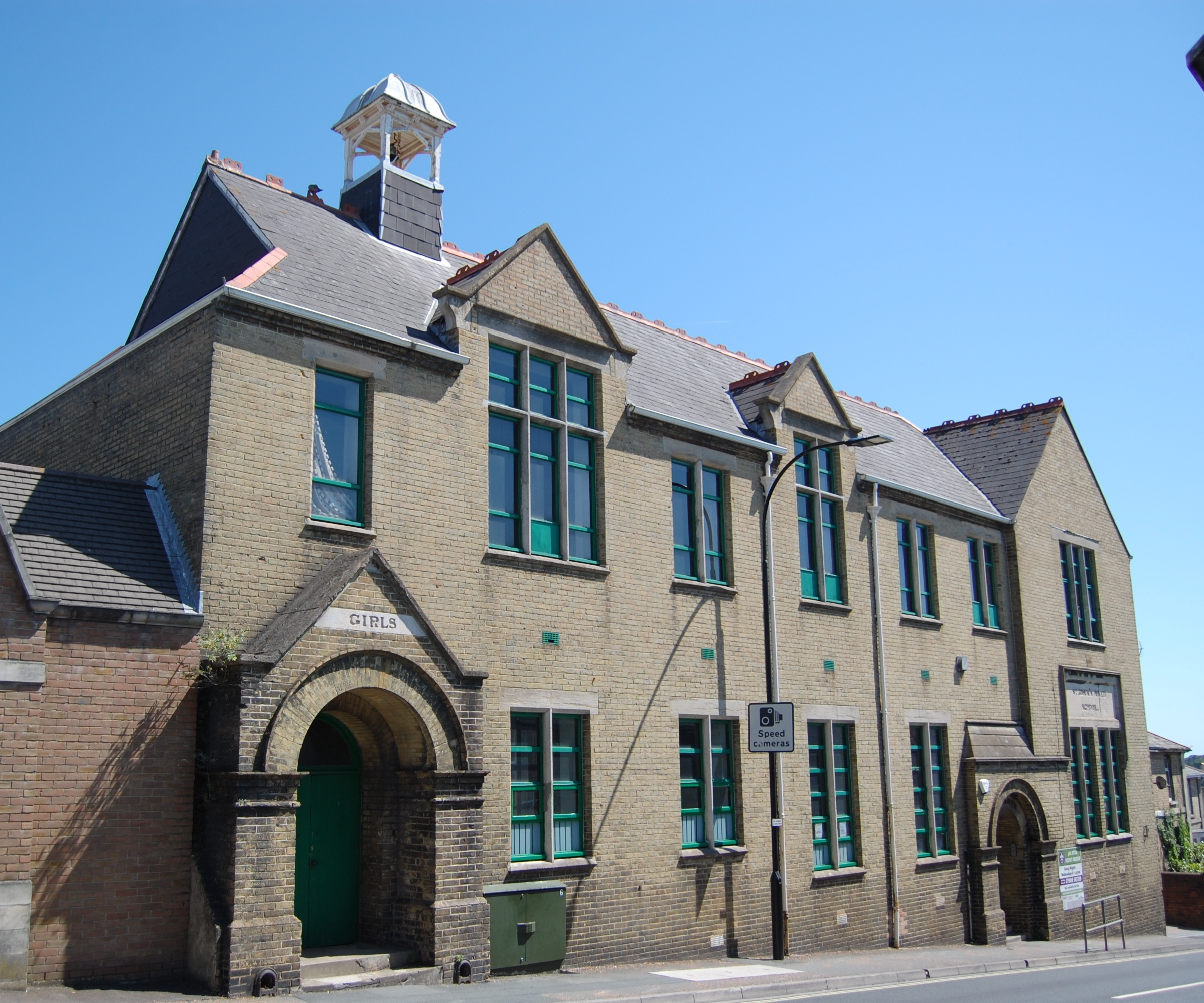
Former St. John's Road School, Ryde

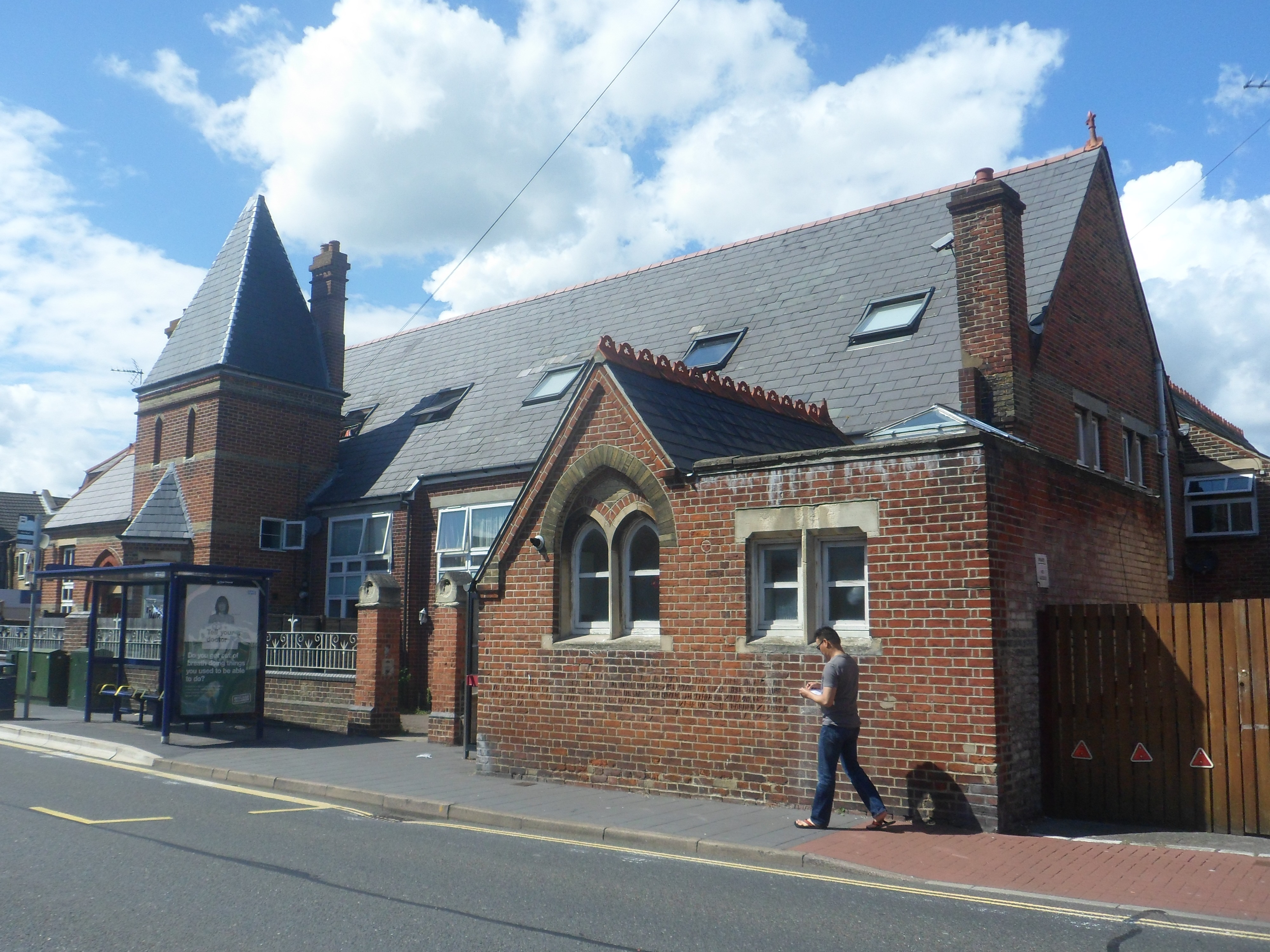
Former New Road School, Fratton

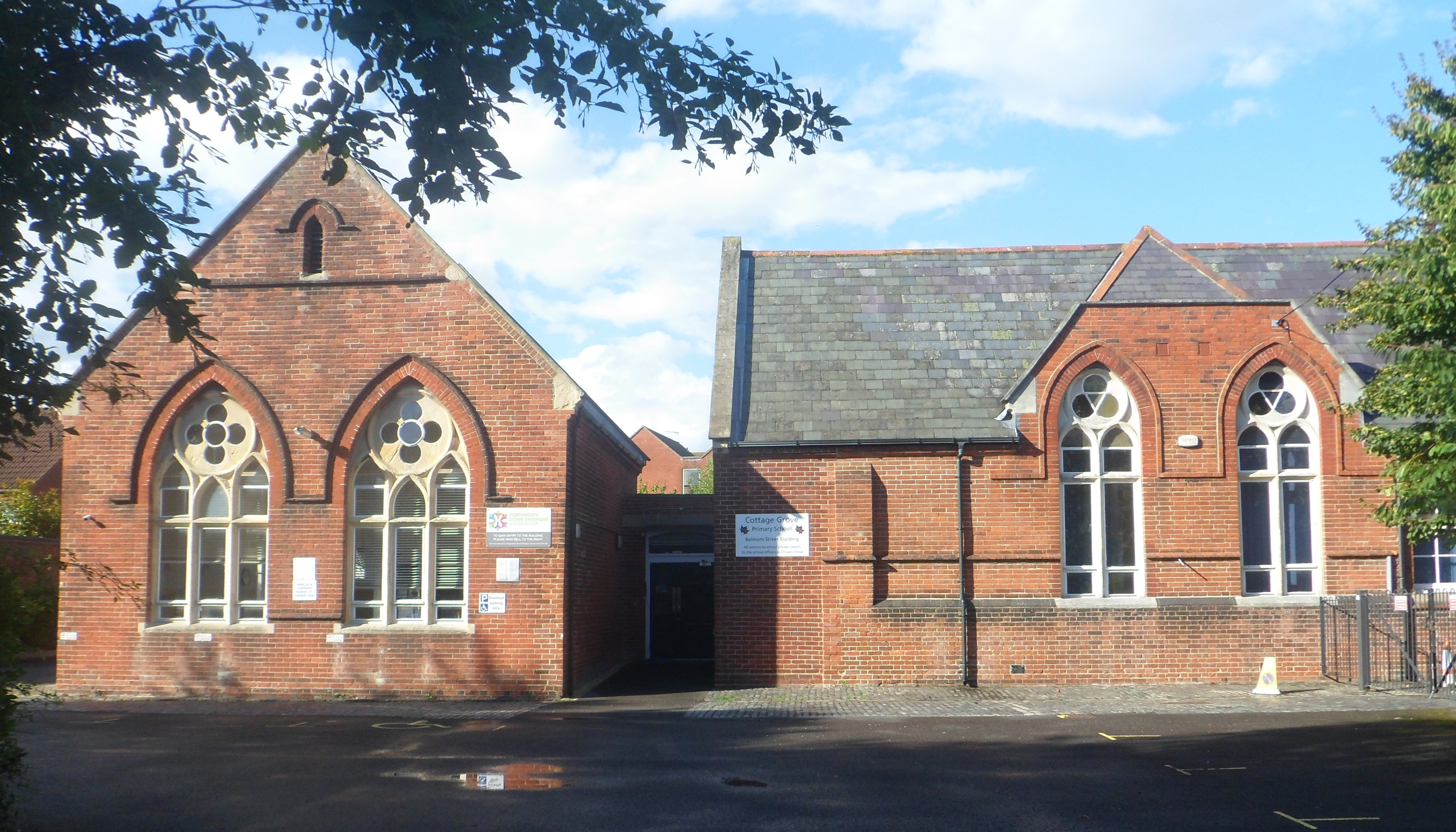
Cottage Grove Primary School, Southsea

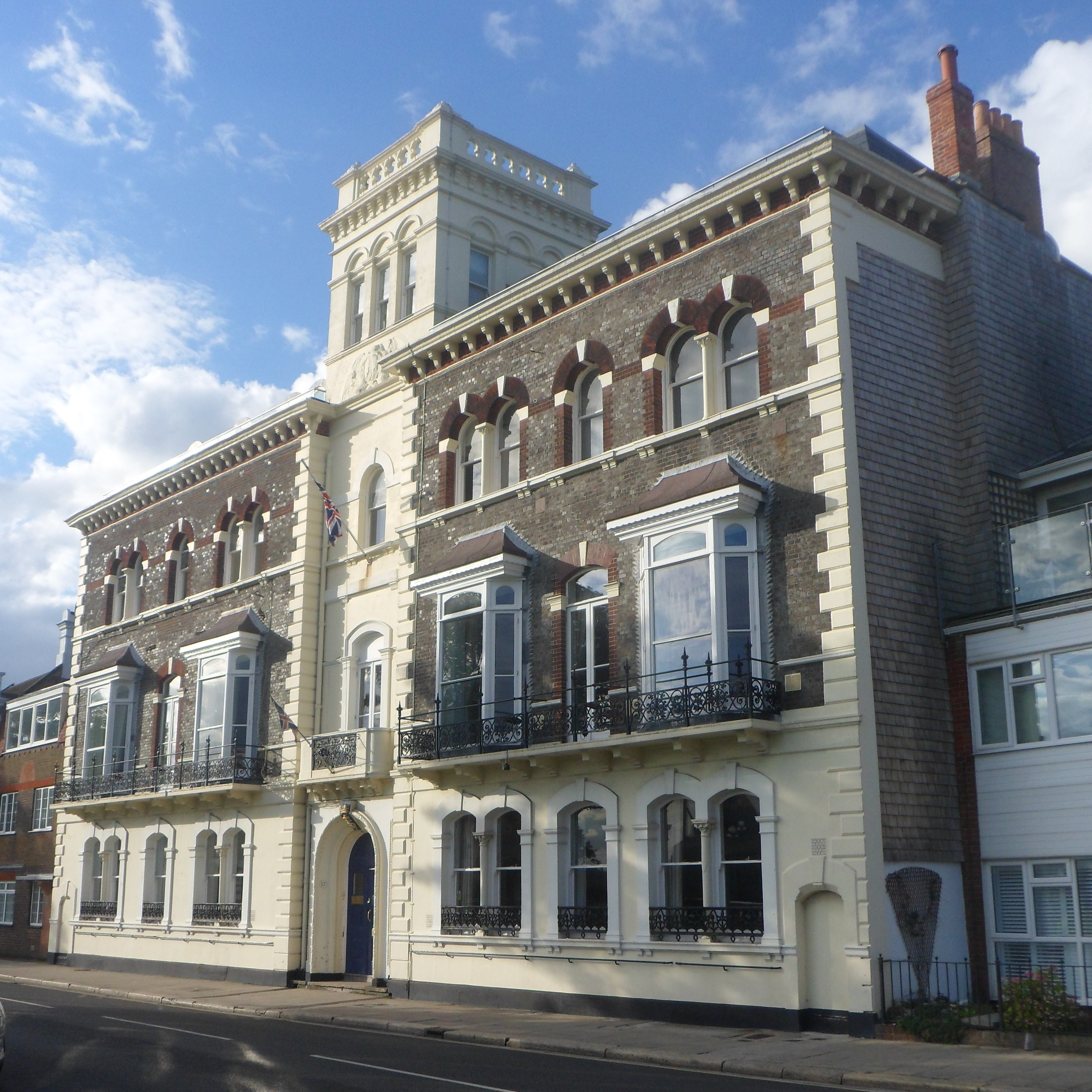
Royal Naval Club, Portsmouth

== See also ==
- List of current places of worship on the Isle of Wight
- Media related to Thomas Hellyer (architect) at Wikimedia Commons

== Bibliography ==
- Halpenny, Francess, ed. (1990). Dictionary of Canadian Biography. Vol. XII (1891 to 1900). Toronto: University of Toronto Press. ISBN 0-8020-3460-8.
- Lloyd, David W.; Pevsner, Nikolaus (2006). The Isle of Wight. The Buildings of England. London: Yale University Press. ISBN 978-0-300-10733-3.
- Slater, John (December 2011). "City of Portsmouth Local List of Buildings: Special Architectural and Historic Interest" (PDF). Portsmouth City Council. Archived (PDF) from the original on 26 June 2017.
- Toms, Jan (2011). The Little Book of the Isle of Wight. Stroud: The History Press. ISBN 978-0-7509-5396-2.
