= St James's Church, East Cowes =

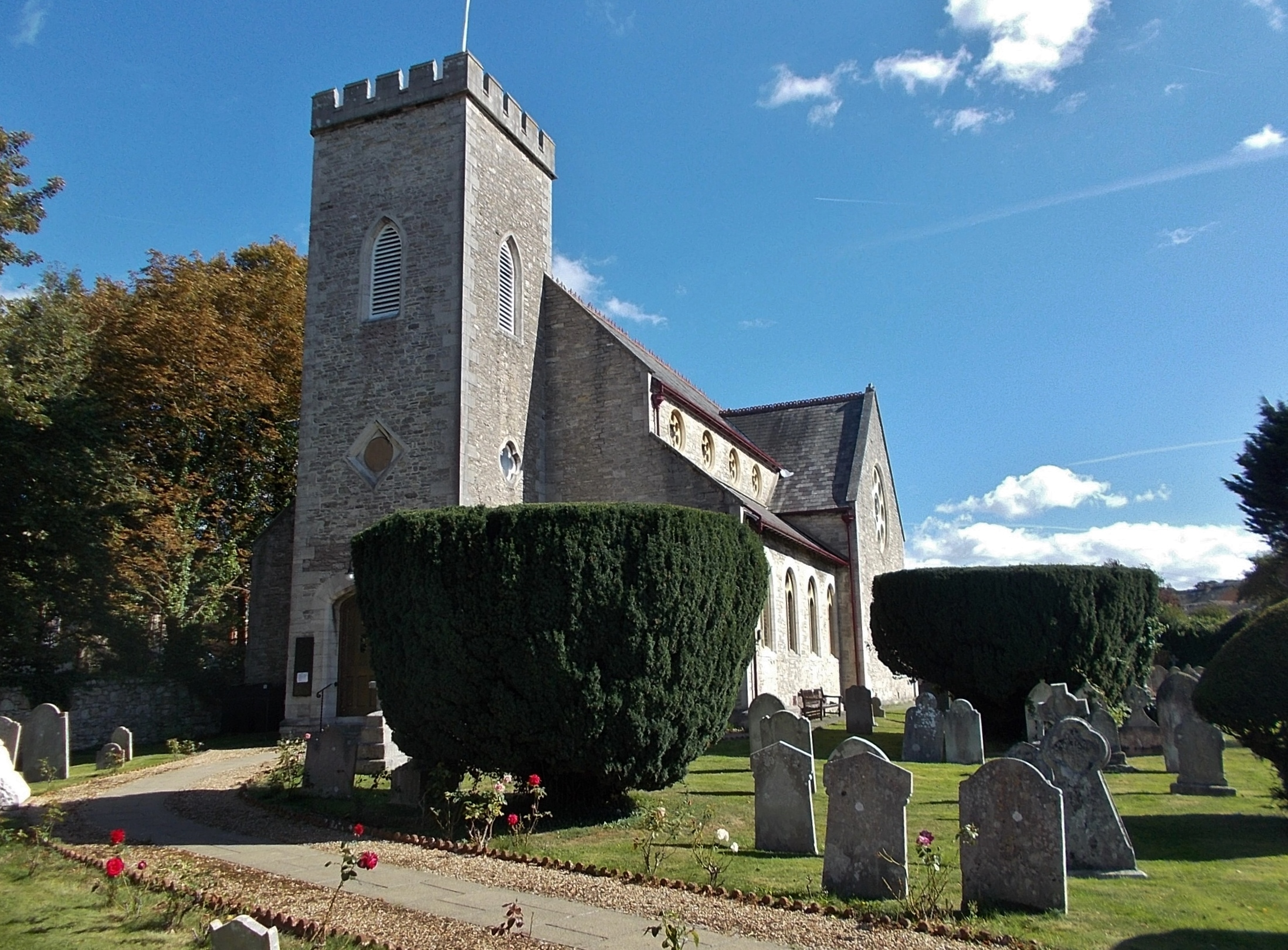
- St James's Church, East Cowes
- St James's Church, East Cowes
- 50°45′28″N 01°17′08″W
- Denomination: Church of England
- Churchmanship: Broad Church

History
- Dedication: St James the Great

Administration
- Province: Canterbury
- Diocese: Portsmouth
- Parish: East Cowes

Clergy
- Rector: Vacant

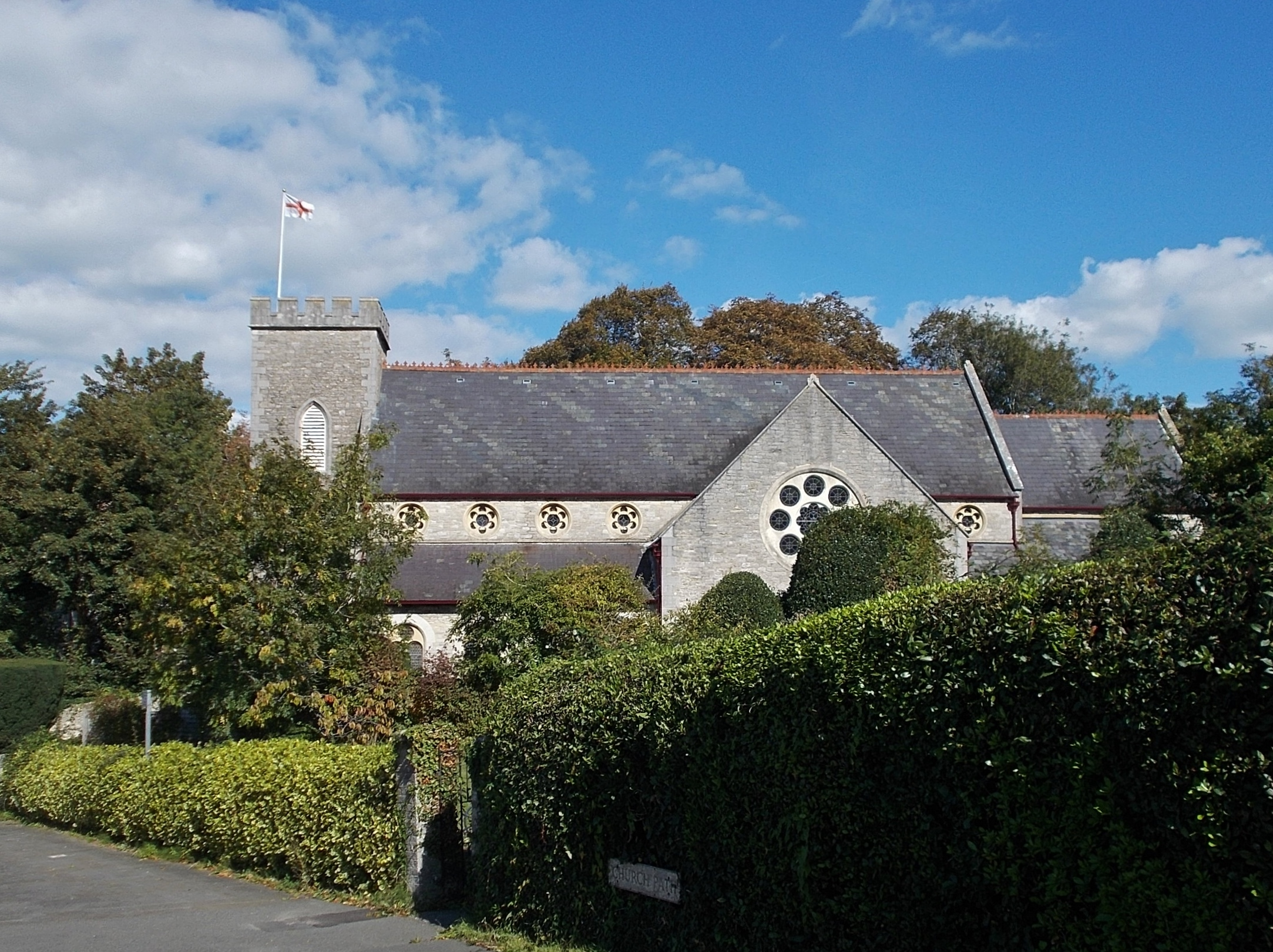
View from south

St James's Church, East Cowes is the Church of England parish church of East Cowes, Isle of Wight.

== History ==
The church was built in 1831 by the architect John Nash. The land was given by Thomas Chamberlayne Esq., of Cranbury Park. On 6 September 1831, the twelve-year-old Princess Victoria laid the foundation stone of the new church. Construction of the church was completed by 1833 and on 12 July 1833, Princess Victoria and her mother the Duchess of Kent attended the consecration service by Charles Richard Sumner the Bishop of Winchester. The total cost of the build was £3,000.

Between 1864 and 1868, the church was greatly enlarged and altered by the architect Thomas Hellyer.

In 1870, the chancel was added, as well as a private chapel.

In June 2009, a new project started allowing the congregation of the church to meet before services to have breakfast together.

Yearly, the church also holds a Jigsaw Puzzle Festival, which is during August and lasts for one week.

== Burials ==
- John Nash (1752–1835), architect

== Parish status ==
The church is in a Plurality with St. Mildred's Church, Whippingham, St. Mark's Church, Wootton and St. Edmund's Church, Wootton.
