= Holy Trinity Church, Ryde =

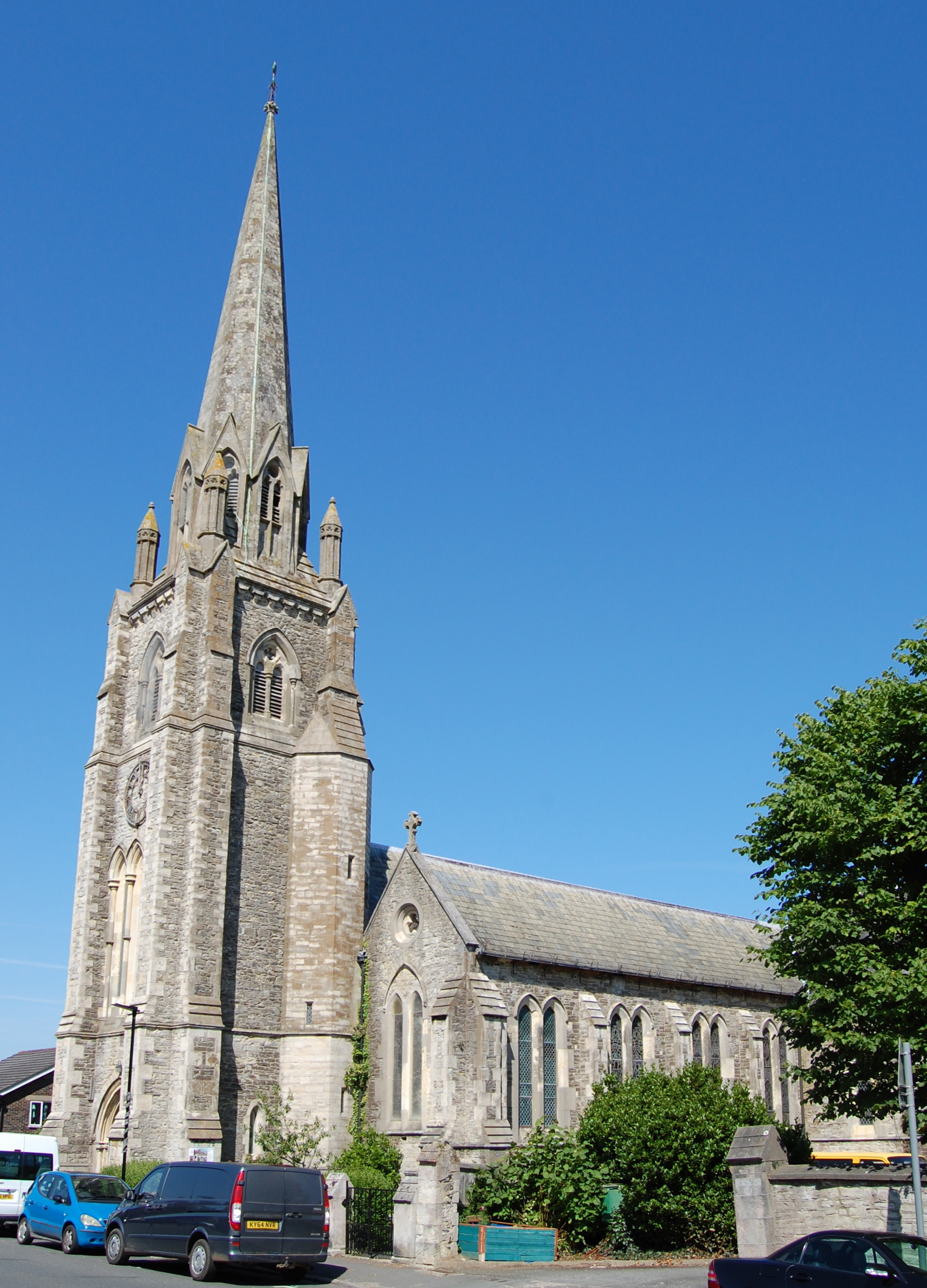
- The former church from the southwest in 2017

- Location on the Isle of Wight
- 50°43′41″N 1°9′28″W
- OS grid reference: SZ 59542 92384
- Location: Dover Street, Ryde, Isle of Wight PO33 2BN
- Country: England
- Denomination: Church of England
- Churchmanship: Anglo Catholic
- Website: www.holytrinityryde.org.uk

History
- Status: Parish church
- Founded: 16 October 1841
- Dedication: Holy Trinity
- Consecrated: 28 October 1845

Architecture
- Functional status: Closed
- Heritage designation: Grade II listed
- Designated: 24 October 1950
- Architect: Thomas Hellyer
- Style: Early English Gothic Revival
- Groundbreaking: 14 October 1841
- Completed: 1860
- Construction cost: £5,806 (equivalent to £610,000 in 2025)
- Closed: January 2014

Specifications
- Capacity: 800 persons

Administration
- Province: Canterbury
- Diocese: Portsmouth
- Archdeaconry: Isle of Wight
- Deanery: Isle of Wight
- Parish: Ryde, Holy Trinity

Holy Trinity Church is a former Church of England parish church located in the town of Ryde on the Isle of Wight. Consecrated while still unfinished in 1845, and parished in 1863, it became the rapidly growing town's first parish church. A "fine, gracious" and "imposing" structure with a 134-foot (41 m) spire, it is visible for miles as a landmark at the northern end of the island, along with nearby All Saints' Church. The building has been used as a community centre since it closed for worship in 2014. Historic England has listed it at Grade II for its architectural and historical importance.

The town of Ryde, which developed in the late 18th and early 19th century, was originally in the large parish of Newchurch, whose parish church was a long way to the south. Private chapels were built in Ryde, but it was only in 1839 that the new vicar of Newchurch set up a committee to found a conventional parish church in the town. Rapid population growth led to the construction of a "large and lofty" stone church capable of holding 800 worshippers. It was designed in the Early English Gothic Revival style by one of the island's most prolific architects, Ryde resident Thomas Hellyer.

== History ==
The ancient parish of Newchurch was vast: it stretched from the north to the south coast of the Isle of Wight and was the largest on the eastern half of the island (the East Medine). The village itself is small and well inland, but the area around the manor of Ryde, on the north coast of the island opposite Portsmouth, developed rapidly as a resort and high-class residential area in the late 18th and early 19th centuries. All Saints, the parish church of Newchurch, was 5 miles (8.0 km) south of the developing town, so two private proprietary chapels were built in Ryde to provide some accommodation for Anglican worshippers: St Thomas's in 1719 (rebuilt in 1827) and St James's (1827–29).

St Thomas's and St James's were not parish churches—St Thomas's was a chapel of ease to Newchurch and the vicar there was responsible for services, while St James's was unconsecrated and sat outside the parochial system— so the town was still formally served by All Saints at Newchurch. In 1839, its new vicar, Rev. W. Spencer Phillips, started a project to build a conventional parish church in Ryde, whose population had grown from 1,600 to more than 5,800 in 30 years. He appointed a fundraising committee, and by 1841 £6,806 had been raised through grants and voluntary contributions. Of this, £1,500 came from the Lind family, who also donated the site on Dover Street southeast of the town centre. (Originally surrounded by fields, the area around the church became built up with villas after 1850.)

The foundation stone was laid on 16 October 1841 in the presence of the Bishop of Winchester by Elizabeth Lydia Lind, widow of the late John Lind, m.d. The church was designed by the local architect Thomas Hellyer and built by Langdon and Denham, a local construction firm. Work was delayed for a year by financial problems, and another local builder Thomas Dashwood had to finish the project.

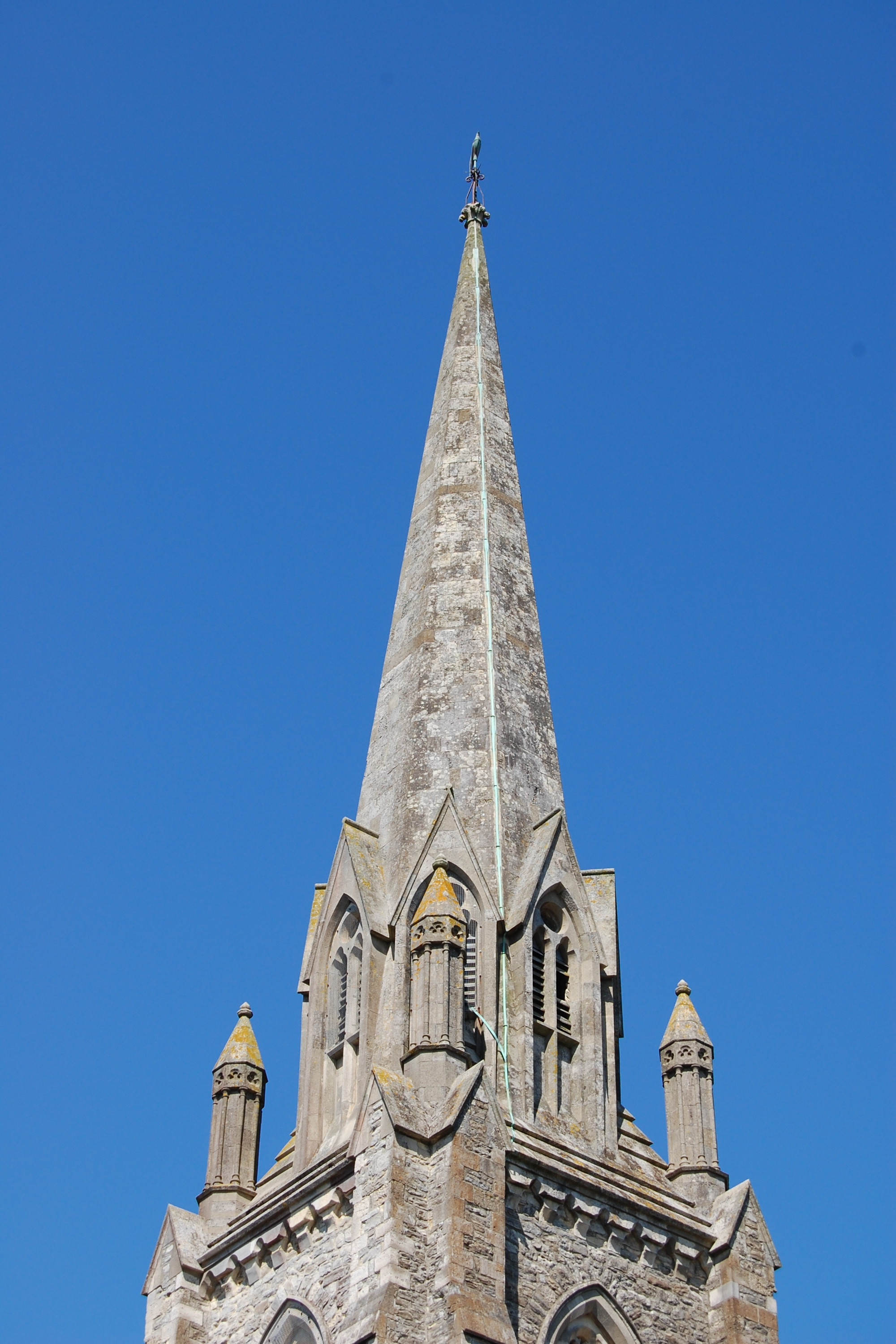
The tall spire is "a prominent landmark when approaching Ryde from The Solent".

Most construction work took place between 1844 and 1846, and the building was still unfinished when it was consecrated by the Bishop of Winchester, Rt. Revd. Charles Sumner on 28 October 1845: the transepts and spire had yet to be added. The following year, by Order in Council, a district called The Chapelry District of the Holy Trinity, Ryde was assigned to the new church. Although it was still part of Newchurch parish, Holy Trinity Church was now ecclesiastically responsible for a large part of Ryde town and was licensed for burials, baptisms and the solemnisation of marriages. A separate parish was created for the church in 1863. At this point Holy Trinity became Ryde's first Church of England parish church. The parish was the first to be created from the territory of Newchurch; subsequently, separate parishes were also formed for Ashey, Ventnor and Wroxall. The first service was held on the day of consecration, 28 October 1845; at that time, 500 of the 800 sittings were free and 300 were subject to pew rents, although all seats were later made free.

Rev. Arthur John Wade, m.a., the first incumbent, was responsible for making the return for the 1851 United Kingdom census, which included for the first time a census of religion. In response to the question about the endowment of the living and other sources of income, he wrote "I will not answer these inquiries"; and added in the remarks section that the question "is quite inquisitive and impertinent ... [and] the Act does not require it, as it is officially but most incorrectly affirmed on [this document]: it is partial and unfair".

The spire was added to the tower in 1846. Two years later the south transept was built, and the church took on its final appearance in 1860 when a north transept was added. This work cost £1,300. An organ chamber was added inside in 1871 at a cost of £286, also designed by a local architect (Francis Newman). The spire was damaged in a storm in 1900, and its distinctive corner pinnacles had to be renewed at a cost of £430; and during repair work in 1963, they were found to be no longer structurally safe and were removed. Replicas were installed five years later as part of a programme of work for which £5,000 was raised.

A small bell was hung in the tower in 1846. On 31 October 1852 it suddenly cracked without warning while being rung during a service. Rev. Arthur Wade, who belonged to the Isle of Wight Philosophical and Scientific Society, reported the events at a meeting the following day, noting that the crack had occurred "without any unusual violence taking place". This was then reported in the Isle of Wight Observer the following week. A letter appeared in the next edition of that newspaper, written by "The Cracked Bell of Trinity Church" of "The Belfry, Trinity Church, Ryde". It noted that the Society had been "mightily puzzled at" what had happened, and went on to say "please ... tell him ... I die of a broken heart, brought on by hearing myself outdone by the silvery tones from a neighbouring steeple. [...] I was never fit for my place; and ... I warn my successor [with my] expiring groans". A larger replacement bell was hung in 1854; it was moved to an "unusual position" below the spire in 1863, from the original bell-chamber in the tower. It was cast by George Mears of the Whitechapel Bell Foundry.

A community facility was created in the crypt in 1992. The Bishop of Portsmouth opened the Crypt Centre, which included a playroom, a refectory serving meals to the public, quiet space for reflection and a chapel. By the start of 2014 the number of regular worshippers had declined to 12, and the church closed for worship in January of that year. The remaining congregation moved to St John's Church in the Oakfield area of Ryde, but Holy Trinity Church has not been deconsecrated or declared redundant. Shortly after closure, a community group acquired the building and converted it into a community centre and events venue with the name "Aspire Ryde". It is a registered charity.

The church was listed at Grade II on 24 October 1950. Such buildings are defined as "nationally important and of special interest".

== Architecture and fittings ==
Thomas Hellyer, who was based in Ryde, was a prolific architect on the Isle of Wight. He designed many churches there and on the mainland, as well as other buildings, and his output has been described as "remarkable" and "very individualistic". Holy Trinity was the largest of his churches on the island, although it was not built fully to his original design: cost constraints meant that a small apse at the east end had to replace the large sanctuary he intended. Consideration was given after World War I to demolishing the apse and building the sanctuary as originally planned, as a war memorial, but this was not done.

Holy Trinity Church is built of rag-stone dressed with ashlar; the roof is of slate. It is a cruciform building in the Early English Gothic Revival style, and has an aisled nave, chancel with an apse, north and south transepts, an entrance porch and a tall, prominent west tower with buttresses and a stone spire which rises to 134 feet 8 inches (41.05 m). Despite its size, it has a "delicate" form and elegant proportions matched with detailed architectural features, and has been called a "masterpiece" and the church's "crowning glory". It is one of two spires (along with that of All Saints) visible for miles around as landmarks of the town. The nave was restored in the 20th century, and screens were installed to separate it from the transepts. The aisles are demarcated by arcades of seven bays. A new altar was placed in the nave in the 1970s, but the original high altar remains. The windows are all lancets: narrow pairs in the aisles, a triple window in the tower, and single lights in the apse. A side chapel dedicated to St Martin, the patron saint of soldiers, is dedicated as a war memorial.

The church contains stained glass windows by James Powell and Sons and Francis Skeat. The Powell glass was installed in the apse in 1913 to replace the original Victorian stained glass; Skeat's window is in the south chapel. The church clock was installed in April 1856 by Messrs. John Moore & Son, of Clerkenwell, London. Money was raised for this in 1855, and was installed that year at a cost of £250. A further £50 was spent the following year to install a second clock face on the Melville Street elevation of the tower.

== Vicars to 1968 ==
- Arthur John Wade, m.a. (1845–1893)
- William Mouat Cameron, m.a. (1893–1906)
- John Elwin Eddis, m.a. (1907–1919)
- The Hon. Ivo Henry John Twisleton-Wykeham Fiennes (1920–1923)
- Noel Howard Stubbs, m.a. (1923–1931)
- Sidney Addison Marsh (1931–1935)
- Leonard Noel St. Alphonse, a.k.c. (1935–1946)
- Oliver Edward Gittins, m.a. (1946–1949)
- David Ford, m.a. (1950–1955)
- Henry Edward Gibson, m.a. (1956–1963)
- John Ramsden Shaw, a.k.c. (1963–)

== Organ ==
A specification of the organ can be found on the National Pipe Organ Register.

=== List of organists to 1968 ===
- J. Trekell (1863–?)
- S. M. Lake (1875–?)
- F. J. W. Williams (1885–?)
- A. Percy James (1890–1937)
- P. J. Monk (1937–1946)
- J. W. Millgate (1947–1957)
- E. W. Matthews (1957–)

== See also ==
- Media related to Holy Trinity Church, Ryde at Wikimedia Commons

== Bibliography ==
- Lane, Marian (1994). Parish Churches of the Isle of Wight. Newport: South Wight Borough Council.
- Lloyd, David W.; Pevsner, Nikolaus (2006). The Isle of Wight. The Buildings of England. London: Yale University Press. ISBN 978-0-300-10733-3.
- Ryde Social Heritage Group (2008). Ryde's Heritage: Our Town, Your Histories. Ryde: Ryde Social Heritage Group. ISBN 978-0-9558987-0-9.
- Vickers, John A., ed. (1993). The Religious Census of Hampshire 1851. Southampton: Hampshire County Council, Planning Department. ISBN 1-8735953-0-1.
- Wheeler, Jack (1968). Towards Another Century: The Chronicle of Holy Trinity Church, Ryde, Isle of Wight. Ryde: Lightbowns.
