= St Peter's Church, Seaview =

Church on the Isle of Wight, England

St. Peter's Church, Seaview
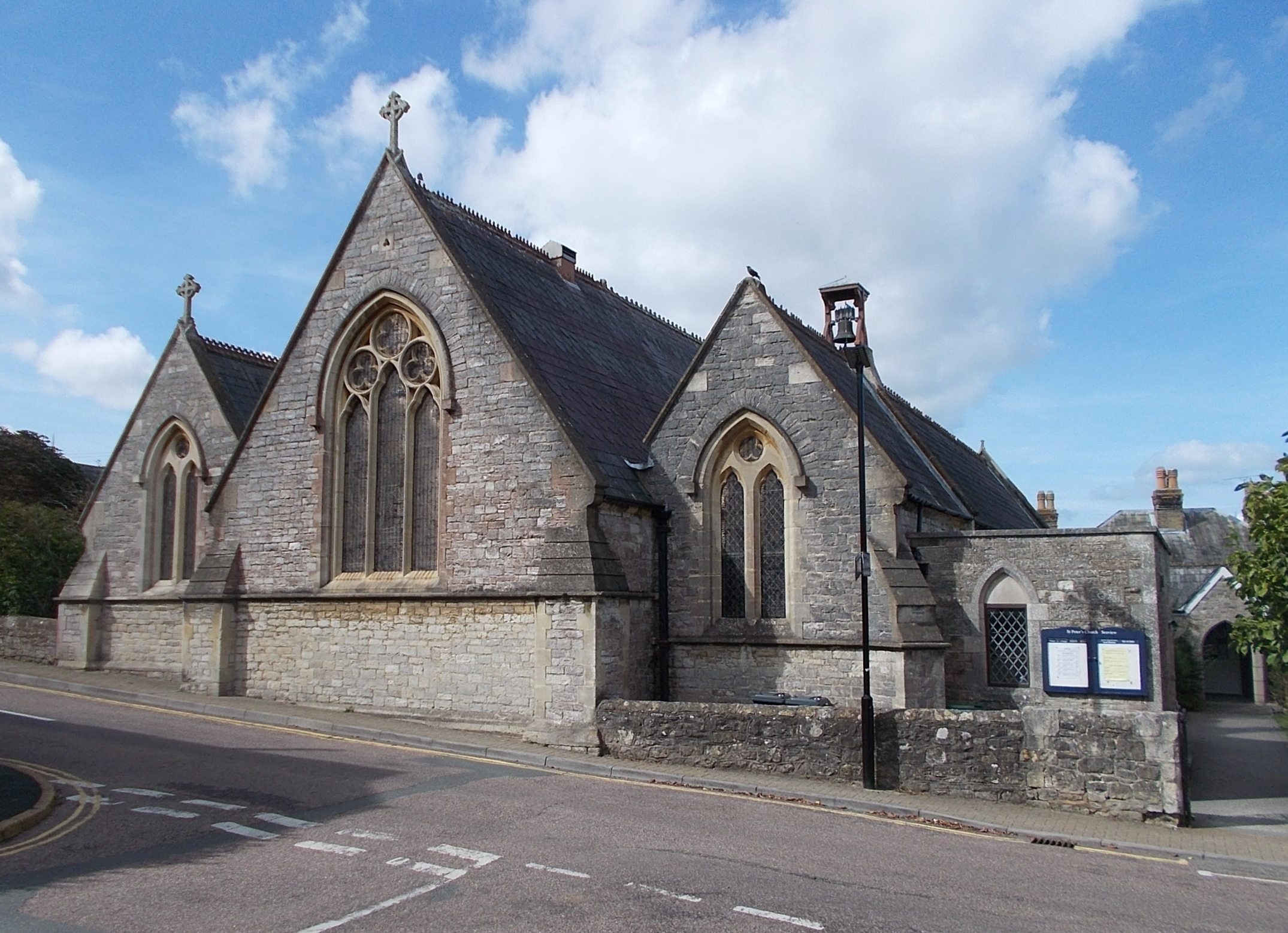
- St. Peter's Church.
- St. Peter's Church, Seaview
- 50°43′13″N 01°06′51″W
- Denomination: Church of England
- Churchmanship: Broad Church

History
- Dedication: St. Peter

Administration
- Province: Canterbury
- Diocese: Portsmouth
- Parish: Seaview, Isle of Wight

St. Peter's Church, Seaview is a parish church in the Church of England located in Seaview, Isle of Wight.

== History ==
The church was built in 1859 by the architect Thomas Hellyer. It was built as a chapel of ease, and has a nave of four bays, north aisle, and south porch. The ecclesiastical parish was formed in 1907.

The south aisle and Lady Chapel were added as war memorials.

== Organ ==
The church Originally had a small pipe organ by Bevington, which was added to at the end of the 1800s by Lewis. A specification of the organ can be found on the National Pipe Organ Register.
