= St Alban's Church, West Leigh =

Church in West Leigh, Hampshire, England

Coordinates: 50.867873°N 0.971557°W

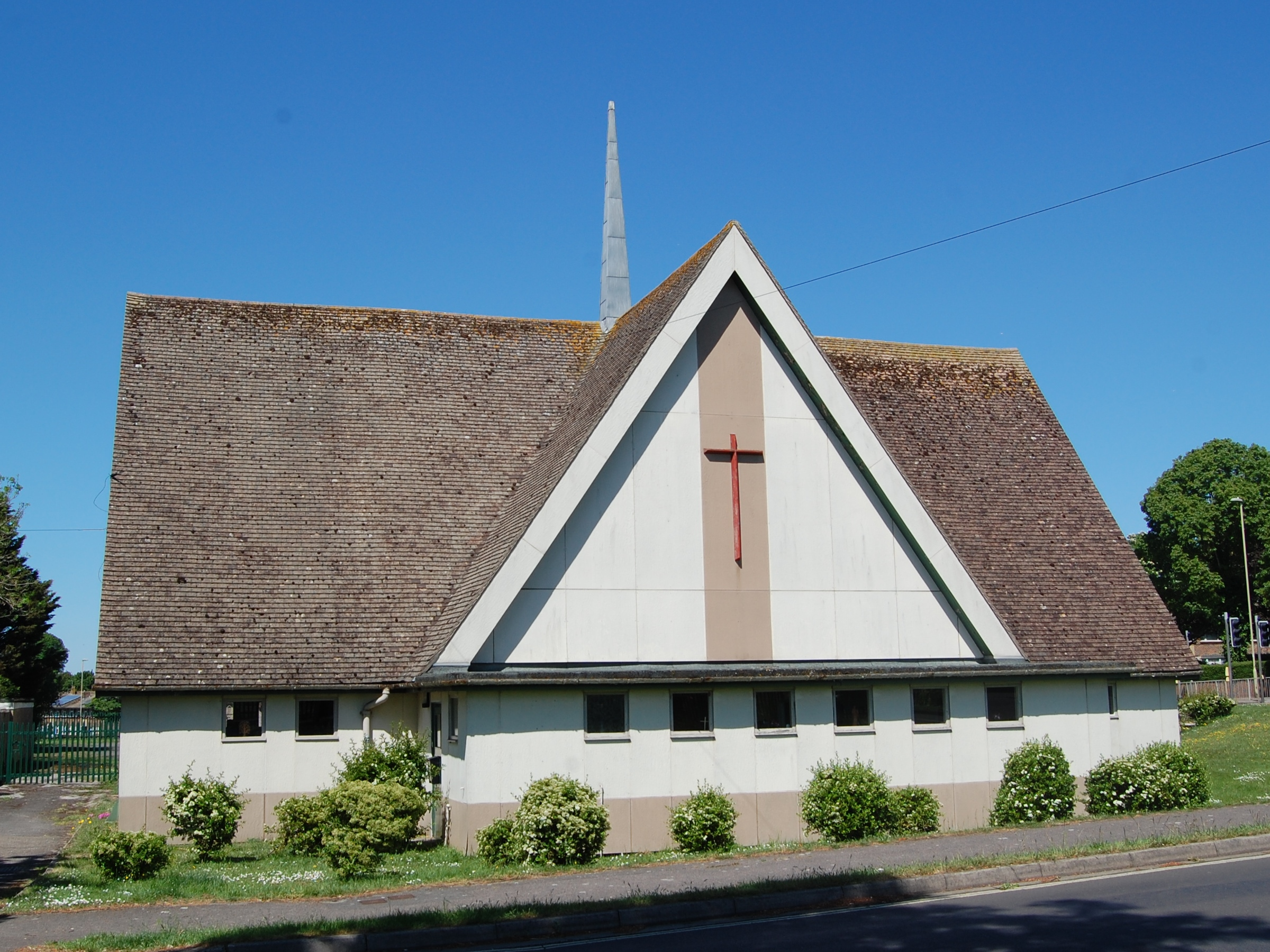
St Alban's Church in May 2019.

St Alban's Church is a Church of England parish church situated in West Leigh, Hampshire, England.

== History ==
The church in its original location in the Naval Galley was dedicated on 7 April 1957 by the Bishop of Portsmouth (Launcelot Fleming). The current church building next to Havant & Waterlooville F.C. was built in 1965-66 and dedicated on 16 July 1966.
