= List of United Kingdom locations: Re-Rh =

The United Kingdom

This is part of the list of United Kingdom locations: a gazetteer of place names in the United Kingdom showing each place's locality and geographical coordinates.

== Re ==
Location	Locality	Coordinates (links to map & photo sources)	OS grid reference
Reabrook	Shropshire	52.63°N 02.94°W	SJ3604
Reach	Cambridgeshire	52.27°N 00.28°E	TL5666
Read	Lancashire	53.80°N 02.36°W	SD7634
Reader's Corner	Essex	51.70°N 00.48°E	TL7204
Reading	Berkshire	51.45°N 00.97°W	SU7173
Readings	Gloucestershire	51.84°N 02.56°W	SO6116
Reading Street	Ashford, Kent	51.03°N 00.73°E	TQ9230
Reading Street	Thanet, Kent	51.37°N 01.41°E	TR3869
Read's Island	North Lincolnshire	53.68°N 00.53°W	SE967221
Readymoney Cove	Cornwall	50.32°N 04.65°W	SX1151
Ready Token	Gloucestershire	51.73°N 01.85°W	SP1004
Reagill	Cumbria	54.54°N 02.61°W	NY6017
Rearquhar	Highland	57.90°N 04.12°W	NH7492
Rearsby	Leicestershire	52.72°N 01.03°W	SK6514
Reasby	Lincolnshire	53.29°N 00.41°W	TF0679
Rease Heath	Cheshire	53.08°N 02.53°W	SJ6454
Reawick	Shetland Islands	60.18°N 01.42°W	HU3244
Reawla	Cornwall	50.17°N 05.36°W	SW6036
Reay	Highland	58.55°N 03.80°W	NC9564
Rechullin	Highland	57.55°N 05.59°W	NG8557
Reculver	Kent	51.37°N 01.18°E	TR2269
Red Ball	Devon	50.94°N 03.31°W	ST0817
Redberth	Pembrokeshire	51.70°N 04.78°W	SN0804
Redbourn	Hertfordshire	51.79°N 00.40°W	TL1012
Redbournbury	Hertfordshire	51.77°N 00.37°W	TL1210
Redbourne	North Lincolnshire	53.47°N 00.53°W	SK9799
Redbridge	Dorset	50.69°N 02.31°W	SY7888
Redbridge	Hampshire	50.91°N 01.47°W	SU3713
Redbridge	London	51.57°N 00.04°E	TQ4288
Red Bridge	Lancashire	54.16°N 02.81°W	SD4775
Redbrook	Gloucestershire / Monmouthshire	51.78°N 02.68°W	SO5310
Redbrook	Wrexham	52.95°N 02.74°W	SJ5040
Red Bull	Cheshire	53.09°N 02.25°W	SJ8355
Red Bull	Staffordshire	52.91°N 02.44°W	SJ7035
Redburn	Northumberland	54.97°N 02.36°W	NY7764
Redcar	Redcar and Cleveland	54.60°N 01.05°W	NZ6124
Redcliffe Bay	North Somerset	51.47°N 02.80°W	ST4475
Redcross	Worcestershire	52.35°N 02.17°W	SO8873
Red Dial	Cumbria	54.79°N 03.16°W	NY2545
Reddicap Heath	Birmingham	52.55°N 01.80°W	SP1395
Redding	Falkirk	55.98°N 03.73°W	NS9278
Reddingmuirhead	Falkirk	55.97°N 03.74°W	NS9177
Reddish	Cheshire	53.38°N 02.46°W	SJ6988
Reddish	Stockport	53.43°N 02.16°W	SJ8993
Redditch	Worcestershire	52.30°N 01.94°W	SP0467
Rede	Suffolk	52.16°N 00.63°E	TL8055
Redenhall	Norfolk	52.40°N 01.32°E	TM2684
Redenham	Hampshire	51.23°N 01.57°W	SU3049
Redesmouth	Northumberland	55.13°N 02.22°W	NY8682
Redford	Angus	56.58°N 02.71°W	NO5644
Redford	Dorset	50.84°N 02.56°W	ST6005
Redford	West Sussex	51.02°N 00.77°W	SU8626
Redgorton	Perth and Kinross	56.43°N 03.49°W	NO0828
Redgrave	Suffolk	52.35°N 00.99°E	TM0477
Redhill	Aberdeenshire	57.12°N 02.38°W	NJ7704
Redhill	Hertfordshire	51.98°N 00.10°W	TL3033
Redhill	North Somerset	51.36°N 02.73°W	ST4963
Redhill	Nottinghamshire	53.00°N 01.15°W	SK5746
Redhill (Hook-a-Gate)	Shropshire	52.67°N 02.80°W	SJ4609
Redhill (Sheriffhales)	Shropshire	52.68°N 02.40°W	SJ7310
Redhill (Telford)	Shropshire	52.69°N 02.43°W	SJ7111
Redhill	Staffordshire	52.84°N 02.25°W	SJ8328
Redhill	Surrey	51.23°N 00.18°W	TQ2750
Red Hill	Bournemouth	50.75°N 01.88°W	SZ0895
Red Hill	Hampshire	50.88°N 00.97°W	SU7210
Red Hill	Herefordshire	52.03°N 02.73°W	SO5038
Red Hill	Kent	51.26°N 00.42°E	TQ6954
Red Hill	Leicestershire	52.56°N 01.21°W	SP5397
Red Hill	Pembrokeshire	51.82°N 04.99°W	SM9418
Red Hill	Wakefield	53.71°N 01.33°W	SE4425
Red Hill	Warwickshire	52.20°N 01.81°W	SP1356
Redhills	Cumbria	54.64°N 02.77°W	NY5028
Redhills	Devon	50.71°N 03.55°W	SX9092
Redhouses	Argyll and Bute	55.78°N 06.22°W	NR3563
Redisham	Suffolk	52.40°N 01.52°E	TM4084
Red Lake	Shropshire	52.68°N 02.47°W	SJ6810
Redland	City of Bristol	51.47°N 02.60°W	ST5875
Redland	Orkney Islands	59.09°N 03.10°W	HY3724
Redland End	Buckinghamshire	51.71°N 00.79°W	SP8302
Redlands	Dorset	50.63°N 02.48°W	SY6682
Redlands	Somerset	51.09°N 02.74°W	ST4833
Redlands	Swindon	51.61°N 01.72°W	SU1991
Redlane	Somerset	50.90°N 03.13°W	ST2012
Redlingfield	Suffolk	52.28°N 01.19°E	TM1870
Red Lodge	Cambridgeshire	52.30°N 00.47°E	TL6970
Red Lumb	Rochdale	53.63°N 02.24°W	SD8415
Redlynch	Somerset	51.09°N 02.42°W	ST7033
Redlynch	Wiltshire	50.97°N 01.71°W	SU2020
Redmain	Cumbria	54.68°N 03.35°W	NY1333
Redmarley D'Abitot	Gloucestershire	51.98°N 02.36°W	SO7531
Redmarshall	Stockton-on-Tees	54.58°N 01.41°W	NZ3821
Redmile	Leicestershire	52.90°N 00.82°W	SK7935
Redmire	North Yorkshire	54.31°N 01.94°W	SE0491
Redmoor	Cornwall	50.41°N 04.70°W	SX0861
Redmoss	Aberdeenshire	57.36°N 02.30°W	NJ8231
Rednal	Shropshire	52.84°N 02.95°W	SJ3628
Rednal	West Midlands	52.38°N 02.00°W	SP0076
Redmonsford	Devon	50.90°N 04.41°W	SS3015
Redpath	Scottish Borders	55.60°N 02.66°W	NT5835
Red Pits	Norfolk	52.80°N 01.09°E	TG0928
Redpoint	Highland	57.65°N 05.80°W	NG7369
Red Post	Cornwall	50.81°N 04.47°W	SS2605
Red Rail	Herefordshire	51.94°N 02.67°W	SO5428
Red Rice	Hampshire	51.16°N 01.52°W	SU3341
Red Rock	Wigan	53.57°N 02.63°W	SD5809
Red Roses	Carmarthenshire	51.76°N 04.61°W	SN2011
Red Row	Northumberland	55.28°N 01.60°W	NZ2599
Redruth	Cornwall	50.23°N 05.24°W	SW6942
Red Scar	Lancashire	53.78°N 02.63°W	SD5832
Redscarhead	Scottish Borders	55.68°N 03.21°W	NT2444
Redstocks	Wiltshire	51.35°N 02.10°W	ST9362
Red Street	Staffordshire	53.05°N 02.27°W	SJ8251
Redtye	Cornwall	50.43°N 04.78°W	SX0263
Redvales	Bury	53.56°N 02.30°W	SD8008
Red Wharf Bay	Isle of Anglesey	53.30°N 04.20°W	SH5381
Redwick	City of Newport	51.55°N 02.85°W	ST4184
Redwick	South Gloucestershire	51.56°N 02.66°W	ST5485
Redwith	Shropshire	52.80°N 03.04°W	SJ3024
Redworth	Darlington	54.60°N 01.62°W	NZ2423
Reed	Hertfordshire	52.00°N 00.01°W	TL3636
Reed End	Hertfordshire	52.00°N 00.04°W	TL3436
Reedham	Lincolnshire	53.08°N 00.14°W	TF2456
Reedham	Norfolk	52.55°N 01.56°E	TG4201
Reedley	Lancashire	53.81°N 02.24°W	SD8435
Reedness	East Riding of Yorkshire	53.69°N 00.80°W	SE7923
Reed Point	Lincolnshire	53.04°N 00.21°W	TF2051
Reed Point	Scottish Borders	55.942°N 2.355°W	NT779721
Reedsford	Northumberland	55.58°N 02.17°W	NT8932
Reeds Holme	Lancashire	53.71°N 02.30°W	SD8024
Reedy	Devon	50.68°N 03.67°W	SX8289
Reef	Western Isles	58.20°N 06.92°W	NB1134
Reen Manor	Cornwall	50.34°N 05.14°W	SW7654
Reepham	Lincolnshire	53.24°N 00.45°W	TF0373
Reepham	Norfolk	52.76°N 01.11°E	TG1023
Reeth	North Yorkshire	54.38°N 01.95°W	SE0399
Reeves Green	Solihull	52.39°N 01.61°W	SP2677
Refail	Powys	52.59°N 03.19°W	SJ1900
Regaby	Isle of Man	54.34°N 04.41°W	SC4397
Regent's Park	City of Westminster	51.52°N 00.15°W	TQ2882
Regil	Bath and North East Somerset	51.35°N 02.67°W	ST5362
Reiff	Highland	58.06°N 05.46°W	NB9614
Reigate	Surrey	51.22°N 00.19°W	TQ2649
Reigate Heath	Surrey	51.23°N 00.23°W	TQ2350
Reighton	North Yorkshire	54.15°N 00.27°W	TA1375
Reisa Mhic Phaidean	Argyll and Bute	56.14°N 05.62°W	NM750007
Reiss	Highland	58.46°N 03.15°W	ND3354
Rejerrah	Cornwall	50.36°N 05.09°W	SW8056
Releath	Cornwall	50.15°N 05.27°W	SW6633
Relubbus	Cornwall	50.12°N 05.41°W	SW5631
Relugas	Moray	57.51°N 03.68°W	NH9948
Remenham	Berkshire	51.54°N 00.89°W	SU7784
Remenham Hill	Berkshire	51.53°N 00.87°W	SU7882
Rempstone	Nottinghamshire	52.81°N 01.15°W	SK5724
Remusaig	Highland	57.98°N 04.15°W	NC7302
Rendcomb	Gloucestershire	51.77°N 01.97°W	SP0209
Rendham	Suffolk	52.22°N 01.43°E	TM3564
Rendlesham	Suffolk	52.12°N 01.38°E	TM3253
Renfrew	Renfrewshire	55.86°N 04.41°W	NS4966
Renhold	Bedfordshire	52.15°N 00.42°W	TL0852
Renishaw	Derbyshire	53.28°N 01.34°W	SK4477
Renish Point	Western Isles	57.73°N 06.97°W	NG040822
Rennington	Northumberland	55.45°N 01.66°W	NU2118
Renshaw Wood	Shropshire	52.65°N 02.25°W	SJ8306
Renton	West Dunbartonshire	55.96°N 04.59°W	NS3878
Renwick	Cumbria	54.78°N 02.63°W	NY5943
Repps	Norfolk	52.69°N 01.56°E	TG4117
Repton	Derbyshire	52.83°N 01.55°W	SK3026
Reraig	Highland	57.28°N 05.63°W	NG8127
Rerwick	Shetland Islands	59.95°N 01.33°W	HU3719
Rerwick Head	Orkney Islands	58.98°N 02.80°W	HY539113
Resaurie	Highland	57.47°N 04.16°W	NH7045
Rescassa	Cornwall	50.24°N 04.83°W	SW9842
Rescobie	Angus	56.65°N 02.81°W	NO5052
Rescorla	Cornwall	50.37°N 04.78°W	SX0257
Reskadinnick	Cornwall	50.22°N 05.32°W	SW6341
Resolis	Highland	57.65°N 04.23°W	NH6765
Resolven	Neath Port Talbot	51.70°N 03.70°W	SN8202
Restalrig	City of Edinburgh	55.95°N 03.15°W	NT2874
Reston	Cumbria	54.37°N 02.84°W	SD4598
Reston	Scottish Borders	55.85°N 02.19°W	NT8862
Restronguet Passage	Cornwall	50.19°N 05.06°W	SW8137
Restrop	Wiltshire	51.57°N 01.88°W	SU0886
Resugga Green	Cornwall	50.37°N 04.78°W	SX0256
Retallack	Cornwall	50.44°N 04.91°W	SW9365
Retford	Nottinghamshire	53.31°N 00.95°W	SK7080
Retire	Cornwall	50.44°N 04.81°W	SX0064
Rettendon	Essex	51.65°N 00.54°E	TQ7698
Revesby	Lincolnshire	53.13°N 00.07°W	TF2961
Revesby Bridge	Lincolnshire	53.12°N 00.05°W	TF3060
Revidge	Lancashire	53.75°N 02.50°W	SD6729
Rew (Ashburton)	Devon	50.51°N 03.76°W	SX7570
Rew (Salcombe)	Devon	50.22°N 03.81°W	SX7138
Rew	Dorset	50.84°N 02.44°W	ST6905
Rewe	Devon	50.78°N 03.50°W	SX9499
Rew Street	Isle of Wight	50.74°N 01.33°W	SZ4794
Rexon	Devon	50.67°N 04.25°W	SX4188
Rexon Cross	Devon	50.67°N 04.25°W	SX4188
Reybridge	Wiltshire	51.42°N 02.13°W	ST9169
Reydon	Suffolk	52.34°N 01.65°E	TM4978
Reydon Smear	Suffolk	52.34°N 01.65°E	TM4978
Reymerston	Norfolk	52.61°N 00.98°E	TG0206
Reynalton	Pembrokeshire	51.73°N 04.76°W	SN0908
Reynoldston	Swansea	51.58°N 04.19°W	SS4890
Rezare	Cornwall	50.56°N 04.31°W	SX3677

== Rh ==
Location	Locality	Coordinates (links to map & photo sources)	OS grid reference
Rhadyr	Monmouthshire	51.71°N 02.92°W	SO3602
Rhandir	Conwy	53.22°N 03.75°W	SH8371
Rhandirmwyn	Carmarthenshire	52.07°N 03.78°W	SN7843
Rhayader	Powys	52.30°N 03.51°W	SN9768
Rhencullen	Isle of Man	54.28°N 04.58°W	SC3291
Rhenetra	Highland	57.47°N 06.30°W	NG4251
Rhes-y-Cae	Flintshire	53.22°N 03.22°W	SJ1870
Rhewl (River Clywedog)	Denbighshire	53.12°N 03.34°W	SJ1060
Rhewl (River Dee)	Denbighshire	52.98°N 03.22°W	SJ1844
Rhewl (Nant Mawr)	Denbighshire	53.14°N 03.40°W	SJ0662
Rhewl (Overton)	Shropshire	52.94°N 02.95°W	SJ3639
Rhewl (Gobowen)	Shropshire	52.89°N 03.04°W	SJ3034
Rhewl-Fawr	Flintshire	53.31°N 03.32°W	SJ1281
Rhewl-Mostyn	Flintshire	53.31°N 03.27°W	SJ1580
Rhiconich	Highland	58.42°N 04.99°W	NC2552
Rhicullen	Highland	57.71°N 04.20°W	NH6971
Rhiews	Shropshire	52.92°N 02.55°W	SJ6337
Rhigos	Rhondda, Cynon, Taff	51.73°N 03.56°W	SN9205
Rhilochan	Highland	58.03°N 04.13°W	NC7407
Rhippinllwyd (Beulah)	Ceredigion	52.04°N 04.51°W	SN2842
Rhippinllwyd (Penbryn)	Ceredigion	52.12°N 04.48°W	SN3050
Rhiroy	Highland	57.85°N 05.11°W	NH1589
Rhitongue	Highland	58.49°N 04.40°W	NC6059
Rhives	Highland	57.72°N 04.11°W	NH7473
Rhiw	Gwynedd	52.82°N 04.64°W	SH2228
Rhiwabon	(Ruabon) Wrexham	52.98°N 03.04°W	SJ3043
Rhiwbebyll	Denbighshire	53.17°N 03.31°W	SJ1265
Rhiwbina	Cardiff	51.52°N 03.22°W	ST1581
Rhiwbryfdir	Gwynedd	52.99°N 03.95°W	SH6946
Rhiwceiliog	Bridgend	51.54°N 03.48°W	SS9784
Rhiwderin	City of Newport	51.57°N 03.06°W	ST2687
Rhiwen	Gwynedd	53.14°N 04.13°W	SH5763
Rhiwfawr	Neath Port Talbot	51.77°N 03.82°W	SN7410
Rhiwinder	Rhondda, Cynon, Taff	51.57°N 03.41°W	ST0287
Rhiwlas (Llanddeiniolen)	Gwynedd	53.16°N 04.14°W	SH5765
Rhiwlas (Llandderfel)	Gwynedd	52.91°N 03.60°W	SH9237
Rhiwlas	Powys	52.87°N 03.20°W	SJ1932
Rhode	Somerset	51.10°N 03.04°W	ST2734
Rhode Common	Kent	51.26°N 00.95°E	TR0656
Rhodes	Manchester	53.54°N 02.24°W	SD8405
Rhodesia	Nottinghamshire	53.31°N 01.16°W	SK5680
Rhodes Minnis	Kent	51.14°N 01.07°E	TR1543
Rhondda	Rhondda, Cynon, Taff	51.65°N 03.49°W	SS9796
Rhonehouse or Kelton Hill	Dumfries and Galloway	54.91°N 03.96°W	NX7459
Rhoose	The Vale Of Glamorgan	51.38°N 03.35°W	ST0666
Rhos	Carmarthenshire	51.99°N 04.36°W	SN3835
Rhos	Denbighshire	53.13°N 03.31°W	SJ1261
Rhos	Neath Port Talbot	51.71°N 03.83°W	SN7303
Rhos	Powys	52.74°N 03.08°W	SJ2717
Rhosamman / Rhosaman	Carmarthenshire	51.81°N 03.84°W	SN7314
Rhoscefnhir	Isle of Anglesey	53.26°N 04.22°W	SH5276
Rhoscolyn	Isle of Anglesey	53.24°N 04.60°W	SH2675
Rhos Common	Powys	52.75°N 03.06°W	SJ2818
Rhoscrowther	Pembrokeshire	51.67°N 05.03°W	SM9002
Rhosddu	Wrexham	53.05°N 03.00°W	SJ3351
Rhos-ddû	Gwynedd	52.88°N 04.60°W	SH2535
Rhosdylluan	Gwynedd	52.83°N 03.69°W	SH8628
Rhosesmor	Flintshire	53.20°N 03.18°W	SJ2168
Rhosfach	Pembrokeshire	51.91°N 04.74°W	SN1128
Rhos-fawr	Gwynedd	52.92°N 04.41°W	SH3839
Rhosgadfan	Gwynedd	53.08°N 04.24°W	SH5057
Rhosgoch	Isle of Anglesey	53.37°N 04.40°W	SH4089
Rhosgoch	Powys	52.11°N 03.19°W	SO1847
Rhosgyll	Gwynedd	52.93°N 04.30°W	SH4540
Rhos Haminiog	Ceredigion	52.25°N 04.14°W	SN5464
Rhoshill	Pembrokeshire	52.03°N 04.64°W	SN190402
Rhoshirwaun	Gwynedd	52.82°N 04.68°W	SH1929
Rhos Isaf	Gwynedd	53.08°N 04.27°W	SH4857
Rhoslan	Gwynedd	52.93°N 04.26°W	SH4840
Rhoslefain	Gwynedd	52.62°N 04.11°W	SH5705
Rhosllanerchrugog	Wrexham	53.00°N 03.05°W	SJ2946
Rhos Lligwy	Isle of Anglesey	53.34°N 04.28°W	SH4886
Rhosmaen	Carmarthenshire	51.88°N 03.99°W	SN6323
Rhosmeirch	Isle of Anglesey	53.26°N 04.31°W	SH4677
Rhosneigr	Isle of Anglesey	53.22°N 04.53°W	SH3173
Rhosnesni	Wrexham	53.04°N 02.98°W	SJ3450
Rhos-on-Sea	Conwy	53.31°N 03.75°W	SH8381
Rhosrobin	Wrexham	53.06°N 03.01°W	SJ3252
Rhossili	Swansea	51.56°N 04.29°W	SS4188
Rhosson	Pembrokeshire	51.87°N 05.31°W	SM7225
Rhostrehwfa	Isle of Anglesey	53.24°N 04.33°W	SH4474
Rhostryfan	Gwynedd	53.08°N 04.25°W	SH4957
Rhostyllen	Wrexham	53.02°N 03.03°W	SJ3148
Rhoswiel	Shropshire	52.91°N 03.05°W	SJ2936
Rhosybol	Isle of Anglesey	53.36°N 04.37°W	SH4288
Rhos-y-brithdir	Powys	52.78°N 03.29°W	SJ1322
Rhosycaerau	Pembrokeshire	51.99°N 05.04°W	SM9137
Rhosygadair Newydd	Ceredigion	52.11°N 04.57°W	SN2449
Rhosygadfa	Shropshire	52.89°N 03.01°W	SJ3234
Rhos-y-garth	Ceredigion	52.32°N 04.01°W	SN6372
Rhosygilwen	Pembrokeshire	52.02°N 04.62°W	SN2040
Rhos-y-gwaliau	Gwynedd	52.89°N 03.57°W	SH9434
Rhos-y-llan	Gwynedd	52.90°N 04.63°W	SH2337
Rhosymadoc	Wrexham	52.97°N 03.02°W	SJ3142
Rhosymedre	Wrexham	52.97°N 03.07°W	SJ2842
Rhos-y-meirch	Powys	52.31°N 03.07°W	SO2769
Rhosyn-coch	Carmarthenshire	51.86°N 04.48°W	SN2921
Rhu	Argyll and Bute	56.01°N 04.79°W	NS2684
Rhuallt	Denbighshire	53.26°N 03.39°W	SJ0775
Rhuddall Heath	Cheshire	53.15°N 02.67°W	SJ5562
Rhuddlan	Denbighshire	53.29°N 03.47°W	SJ0278
Rhue	Highland	57.92°N 05.21°W	NH1097
Rhum	Highland	56.98°N 06.32°W	NM376960
Rhuthun / Ruthin	Denbighshire	53.11°N 03.31°W	SJ1258
Rhuvoult	Highland	58.43°N 05.01°W	NC2454
Rhyd	Ceredigion	52.04°N 04.55°W	SN2542
Rhyd	Gwynedd	52.94°N 04.04°W	SH6341
Rhydaman / Ammanford	Carmarthenshire	51.78°N 04.00°W	SN6212
Rhydargaeau	Carmarthenshire	51.91°N 04.28°W	SN4326
Rhydcymerau	Carmarthenshire	52.02°N 04.08°W	SN5738
Rhydd	Worcestershire	52.10°N 02.24°W	SO8345
Rhyd-Ddu	Gwynedd	53.04°N 04.14°W	SH5652
Rhydd Green	Worcestershire	52.10°N 02.24°W	SO8345
Rhydding	Neath Port Talbot	51.66°N 03.80°W	SS7598
Rhydgaled	Conwy	53.16°N 03.51°W	SH9964
Rhydlewis	Ceredigion	52.09°N 04.42°W	SN3447
Rhydlios	Gwynedd	52.83°N 04.70°W	SH1830
Rhydlydan	Powys	52.52°N 03.40°W	SO0593
Rhydlydan	Conwy	53.03°N 03.65°W	SH8950
Rhydowen	Ceredigion	52.08°N 04.27°W	SN4445
Rhydowen	Carmarthenshire	51.92°N 04.63°W	SN1928
Rhyd-Rosser	Ceredigion	52.28°N 04.11°W	SN5667
Rhydspence	Powys	52.11°N 03.11°W	SO2447
Rhydtalog	Flintshire	53.07°N 03.15°W	SJ2354
Rhyd-uchaf	Gwynedd	52.91°N 03.63°W	SH9037
Rhydwyn	Isle of Anglesey	53.36°N 04.54°W	SH3188
Rhyd-y-Brown	Pembrokeshire	51.85°N 04.81°W	SN0621
Rhyd-y-clafdy	Gwynedd	52.87°N 04.49°W	SH3234
Rhydycroesau	Shropshire	52.86°N 03.13°W	SJ2430
Rhyd-y-cwm	Powys	52.42°N 03.22°W	SO1781
Rhydyfelin	Carmarthenshire	52.00°N 04.50°W	SN2837
Rhydyfelin	Ceredigion	52.39°N 04.07°W	SN5979
Rhydyfelin	Powys	52.52°N 03.35°W	SO0893
Rhydyfelin	Rhondda, Cynon, Taff	51.58°N 03.31°W	ST0988
Rhyd-y-foel	Conwy	53.27°N 03.63°W	SH9176
Rhyd-y-fro	Neath Port Talbot	51.72°N 03.86°W	SN7105
Rhydygele	Pembrokeshire	51.87°N 05.12°W	SM8524
Rhyd-y-gwin	Swansea	51.71°N 03.92°W	SN6703
Rhyd-y-gwystl	Gwynedd	52.92°N 04.38°W	SH4039
Rhydymain	Gwynedd	52.78°N 03.78°W	SH8022
Rhyd-y-meirch	Monmouthshire	51.75°N 03.00°W	SO3107
Rhyd-y-meudwy	Denbighshire	53.04°N 03.31°W	SJ1251
Rhydypennau	Ceredigion	52.45°N 04.01°W	SN6285
Rhydymwyn	Flintshire	53.18°N 03.19°W	SJ2066
Rhyd-yr-onen	Gwynedd	52.59°N 04.05°W	SH6102
Rhyd-y-sarn	Gwynedd	52.95°N 03.95°W	SH6942
Rhydywrach	Carmarthenshire	51.83°N 04.67°W	SN1619
Rhyl	Denbighshire	53.31°N 03.48°W	SJ0181
Rhymney (Rhymni)	Caerphilly	51.75°N 03.29°W	SO1107
Rhyn	Shropshire	52.92°N 03.04°W	SJ3037
Rhynd	Perth and Kinross	56.36°N 03.37°W	NO1520
Rhynie	Aberdeenshire	57.33°N 02.84°W	NJ4927
