= Wightbus =

British bus operating company

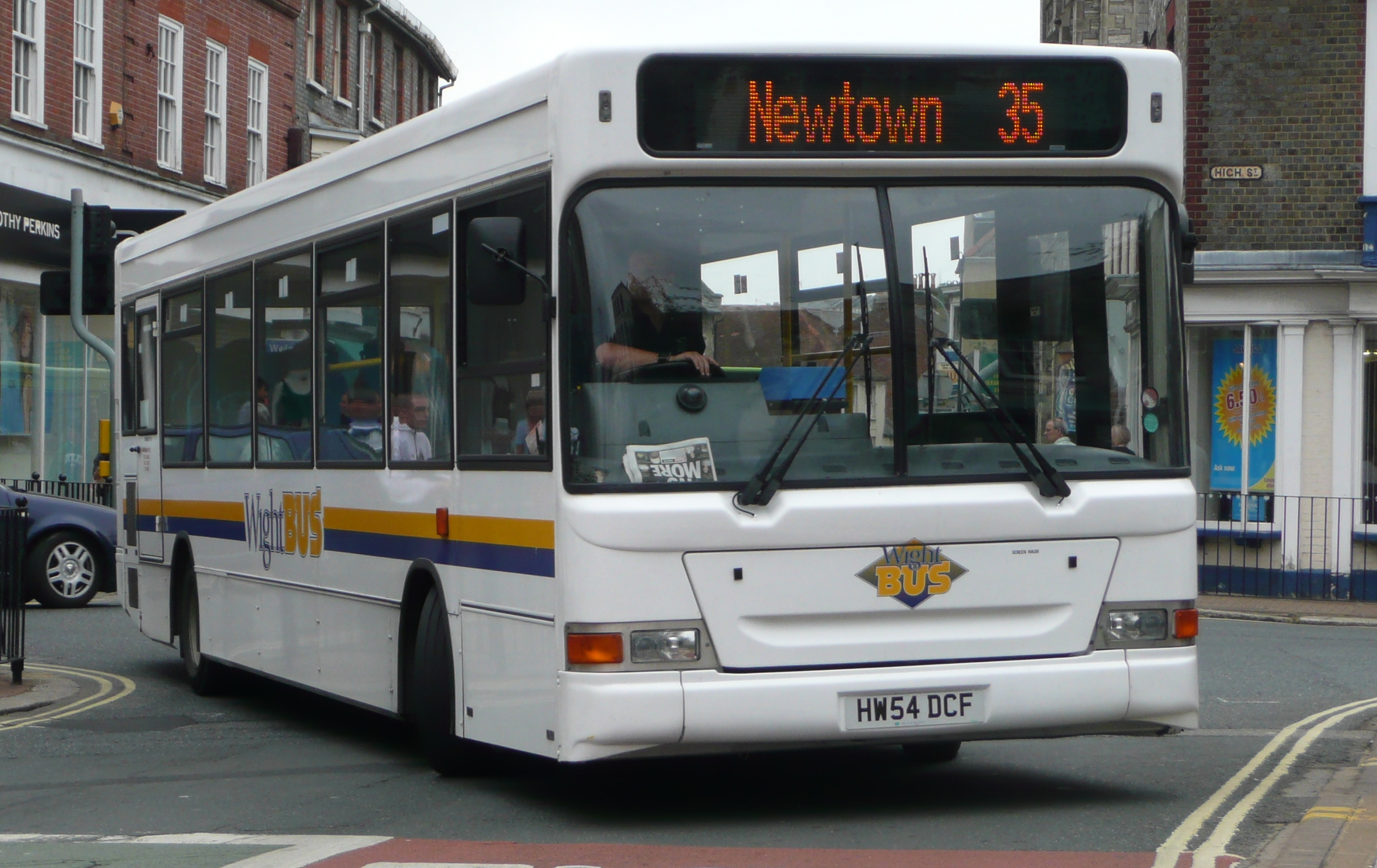
- Plaxton Pointer 2 bodied Dennis Dart SLF in Newport in February 2008
- Founded: 1970
- Defunct: 2 September 2011
- Headquarters: Newport
- Service area: Isle of Wight
- Service type: School and public services on the Isle of Wight
- Destinations: Whole of the Isle of Wight
- Fleet: 27
- Website: Wightbus homepage

Wightbus was a bus operator on the Isle of Wight, established and owned by Mr Anand Pandya, Mr Ryan Reed, and the Isle of Wight County Council. It operated a network of thirteen local bus services running across the island, mostly services which would not have been viable for the island's dominant commercial operator, Southern Vectis, to operate.

Wightbus also provided school buses, and transported disabled adults to various day care centres on behalf of the council's social services department. A dial-a-bus service was run over some parts of the island to residents who would be unable to leave their homes to catch a regular service bus.

The Wightbus fleet was made up of 27 vehicles with capacities ranging from 16 to 72. Around 40 trained drivers and passenger-escort staff were employed. Over 1 million passengers travelled on Wightbus services annually.

Wightbus was axed by the new unitary Isle of Wight Council in February 2011, with the last services operating on 2 September 2011. Under a new "Community Bus Partnership", Southern Vectis agreed to take on a number of routes previously operated by Wightbus to rural areas of the island in co-ordination with the Isle of Wight Council and the town and parish councils which the services run in. The services are all run by volunteer drivers.

== History ==
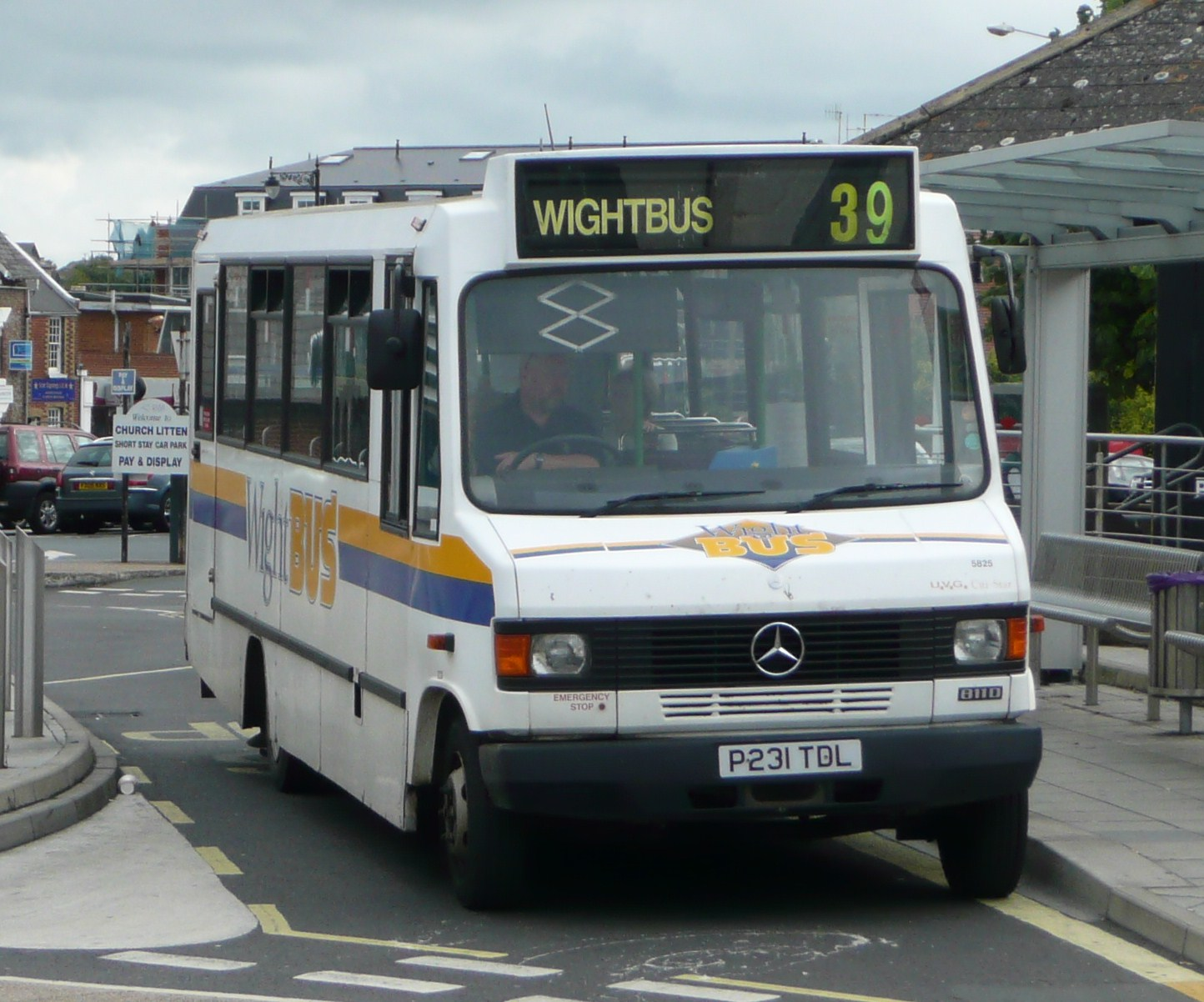
UVG CityStar bodied Mercedes-Benz 811D in Newport bus station in August 2008

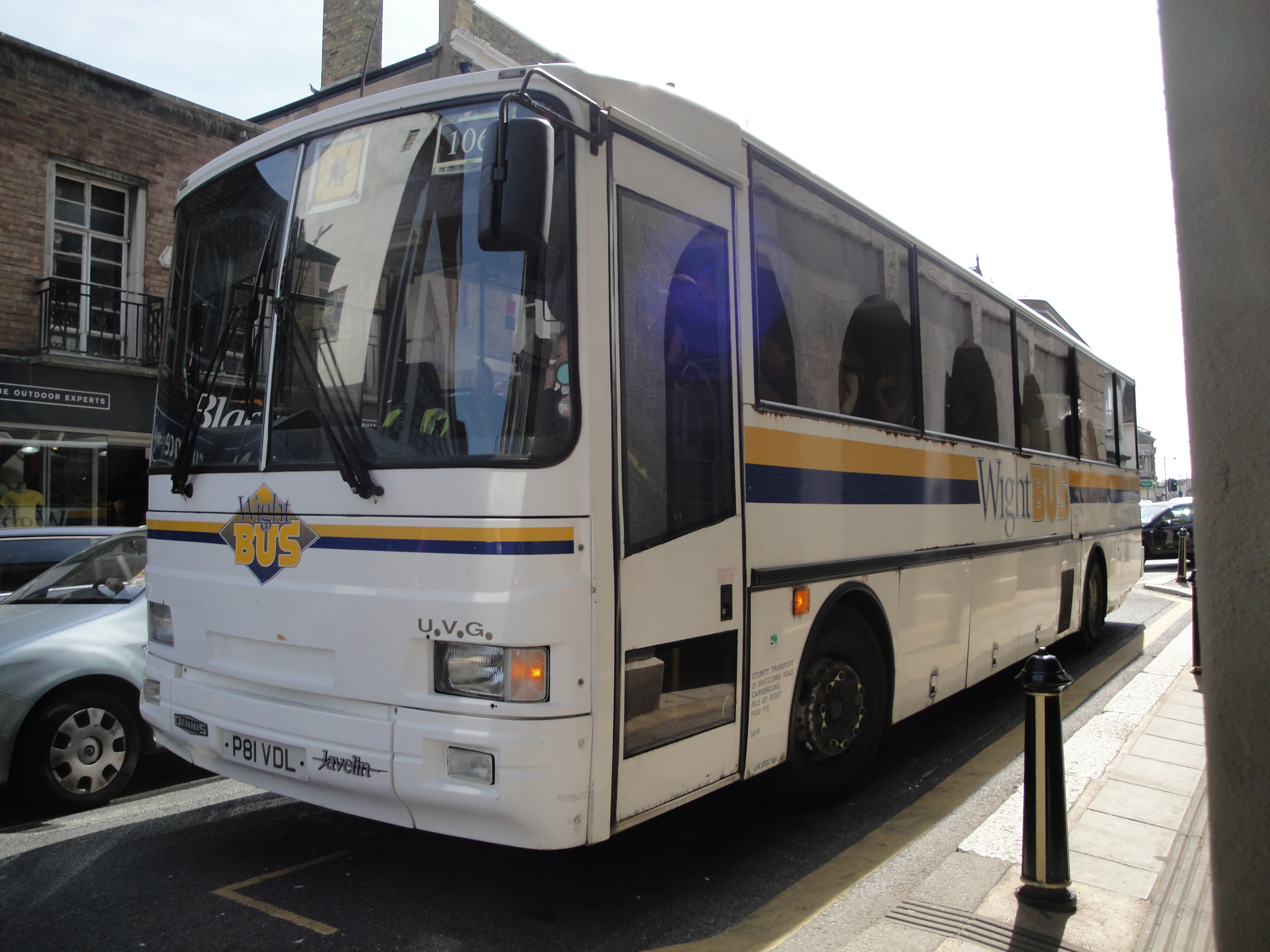
UVG bodied Dennis Javelin in Newport in June 2010

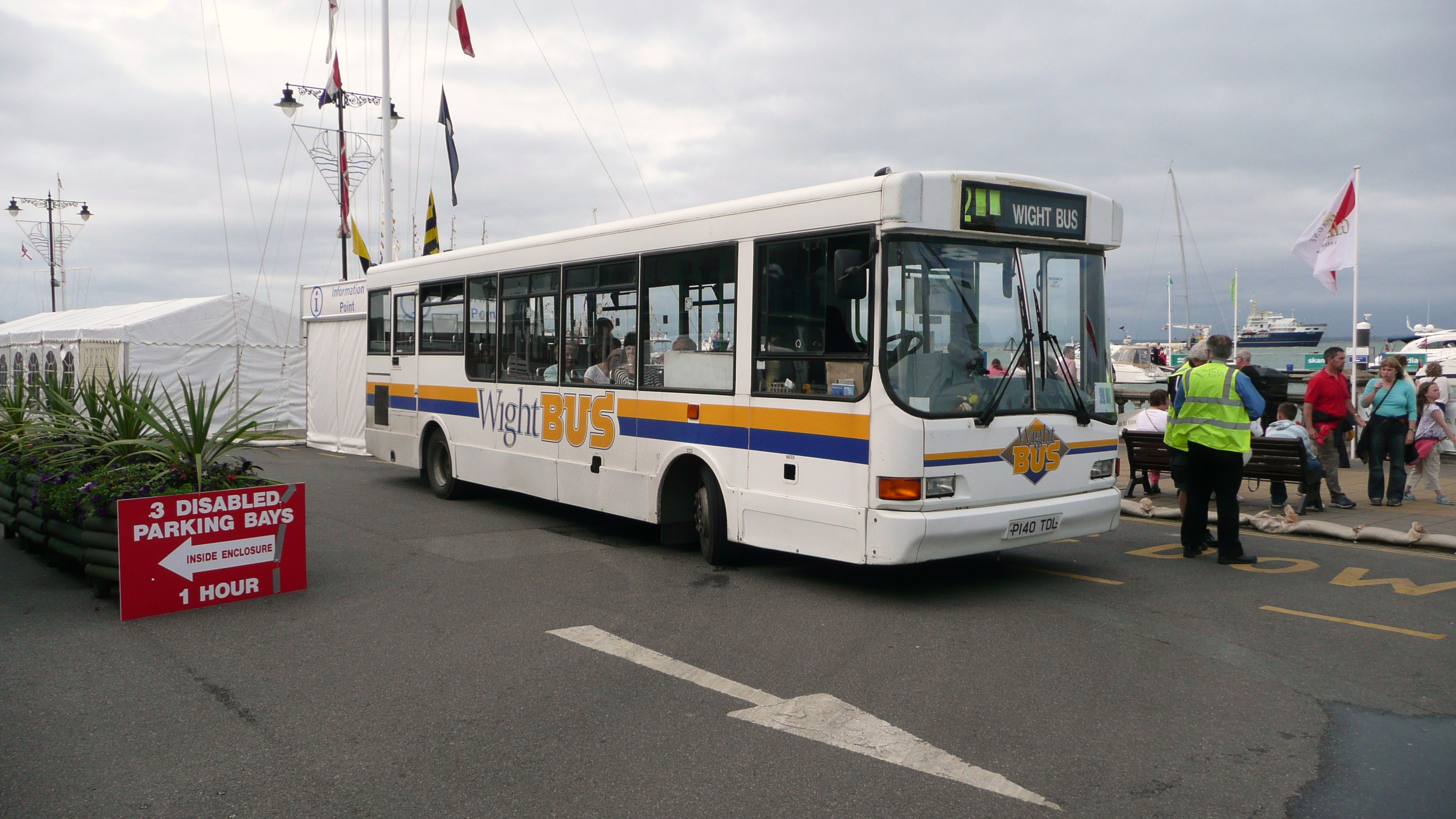
UVG Urbanstar bodied Dennis Dart operating the Sailbus service amongst the Cowes Week regatta in August 2008

The name 'Wightbus' was the trading name of the Isle of Wight Council's own bus fleet, to which it was known for the last 14 years of its operations. Before 1997, the fleet was in a yellow livery, with 'County Bus' along the sides. The name 'Wightbus' reduced the perceived connection between the Council and the company. Exactly how closely tied the two were was sometimes unclear.

From the new school year from September 2010, all school journeys on the island became operated by Southern Vectis under one contract. As a result, some Wightbus drivers were made redundant, with the others able to transfer to Southern Vectis.

In December 2010, it was announced that the Isle of Wight Council planned to axe all Wightbus services from 31 August 2011 in a bid to save around £175,000 due to funding cuts caused by central government to tackle the national deficit. Despite protests by islanders and alternatives offered by other councillors, it was voted through by Conservative councillors at the full council meeting on 23 February 2011. The last Wightbus timetable ran until 2 September 2011 and was not continued from this date. All routes passed to Southern Vectis who are operating in a community partnership with the Isle of Wight Council and local town and parish councils.

== Operations ==
Initially, the main work Wightbus undertook was on school journeys. As many settlements on the Island are small, while most are large enough to support at least one primary school, there are few state-run high schools (and even fewer private ones). Because of the Island's 3-tier school system whilst Wightbus operated, there were also middle schools, which were located in most towns but not in any of the many villages. Because of this, there was an extensive 'network' of school bus routes, all operated under contract from the Council, to get a few primary school pupils from remote areas to the nearest larger settlement, to transport middle school pupils between nearby towns, and to move large numbers of high school students, sometimes halfway across the County.

A few of these school routes were not available to the general public and operated with destinations such as 'School Bus' with no route number, however many were available for anyone to use, showing a route number and appearing in the Council's own Public Transport Handbook.

In March 2008 Southern Vectis revised its school bus timetable to include several journeys already operated by the Wightbus school network. As the extra services were costing the council around £400,000 a year to run and were running empty anyway they were discontinued from September 2008.

When the buses were not in use for school journeys, and in the last year of the company's operations when it no longer operated school services, some were used on the handful of normal routes the company ran in various rural and estate locations that would not be commercially viable for the main operator, Southern Vectis to run. This initially started with Wightbus taking on a much larger share of evening and weekend services from October 2004 as tendering these services to Southern Vectis would be much more expensive and would have to result in service cuts. Eventually however, all these services were timetabled separately from any of Southern Vectis' services. Some of these (notably the 16, which had a dedicated vehicle running in a modified Wightbus livery) are operated during school journey periods and so additional buses were required beyond those purely for school purposes.

In the period of Cowes Week until 2008, Wightbus ran the "Sailbus", a free route which linked the Ward Avenue car parks with Baring Road, Castle Hill, Parade, Queen's Road, along the sea front to Gurnard, Woodvale Road, Baring Road, Crossfield Avenue (for the heliport and the coach setting down point) and the main events of Cowes for visitors. This used three spare buses – not working due to Cowes Week being in the school Summer holidays – to maintain a five-minute frequency. The sailbus was the only public vehicle permitted onto the Parade during Cowes Week. However, the lack of a sponsor for the 2009 event and the Isle of Wight Council no longer receiving income from the Northwood House car park because it doesn't operate it, caused the council to instead reach agreement with Southern Vectis to run the service with a £1 per journey fare.

=== Former routes ===
The public network as of 18 April 2011 until the last bus on 2 September 2011 was as follows. During the last timetable, all services operated Monday-Friday only, with no service provided on Saturdays and Sundays. Since the closure of Wightbus in September 2011, all routes have passed to Southern Vectis who are running in a community partnership with the Isle of Wight Council and town and parish councils.

| No. | From | To | Via |
|---|---|---|---|
| 22 | Sandown | Sibden Hill | Perowne Way, Lake, Shanklin |
| 23 | Newport | Shanklin | Newchurch, Winford, Alverstone |
| 24 | Shanklin | Yaverland | Lake, Sandown |
| 30 | Cowes | Newport | Gurnard, Northwood |
| 31 | Wroxall | Bonchurch | Ventnor, Ventnor Botanic Garden, St Lawrence |
| 32 | Cowes | Cowes | Egypt Point, Gurnard, Northwood |
| 33/33A | Newport | Ryde | Blackwater/Wootton, Havenstreet, Haylands |
| 35 | Yarmouth | Newport | Bouldnor, Ningwood, Calbourne, Newtown, Marks Corner, Thorness Bay Holiday Centre, Porchfield |
| 36 | Yarmouth | Newport | Bouldnor, Ningwood, Calbourne, Brighstone, Yafford, Moortown, Chillerton |
| 39 | Newport | Newport | Pan Estate |

=== Dial-A-Bus ===
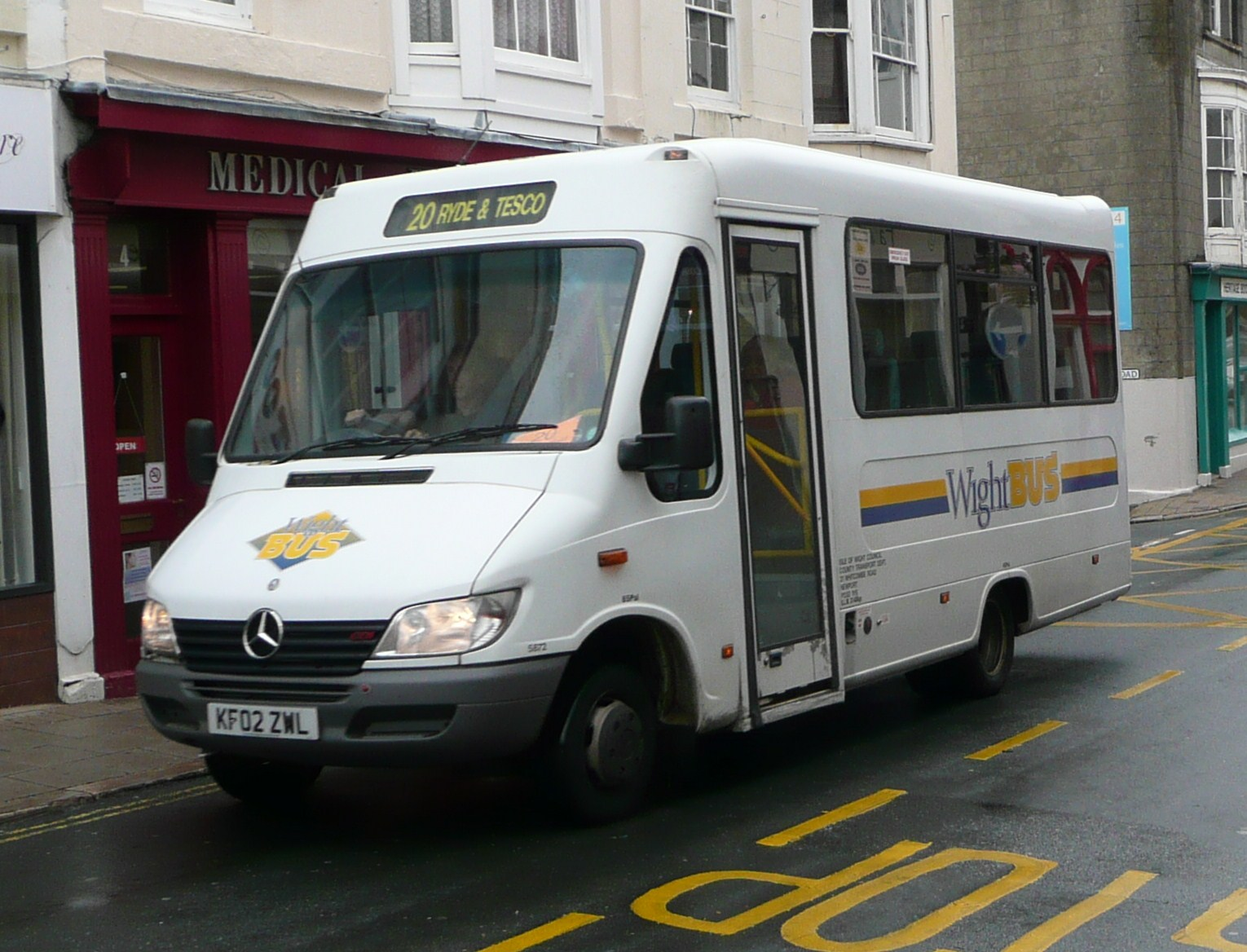
UVG bodied Mercedes-Benz Sprinter in Ryde in August 2008

Wightbus also operated several 'dial-a-bus' services enabling passengers to book a service in advance and were aimed at disabled people that may not otherwise have been able to leave the house. These routes did not use numbers; they only had 'dial-a-bus' displayed on the front. The following services were in operation from 3 April 2008 until the last bus on 2 September 2011:

- Ryde – Wootton – East Cowes – Newport (Mondays only)
- Freshwater – Totland – Yarmouth – Newport (Tuesdays only)
- Bembridge – St Helens – Sandown – Shanklin – Newport (Thursdays only)
- Cowes – Newport (Mondays and Fridays)
- Ventnor – Whitwell – Niton – Newport (Fridays only)

== Subsidised fares ==
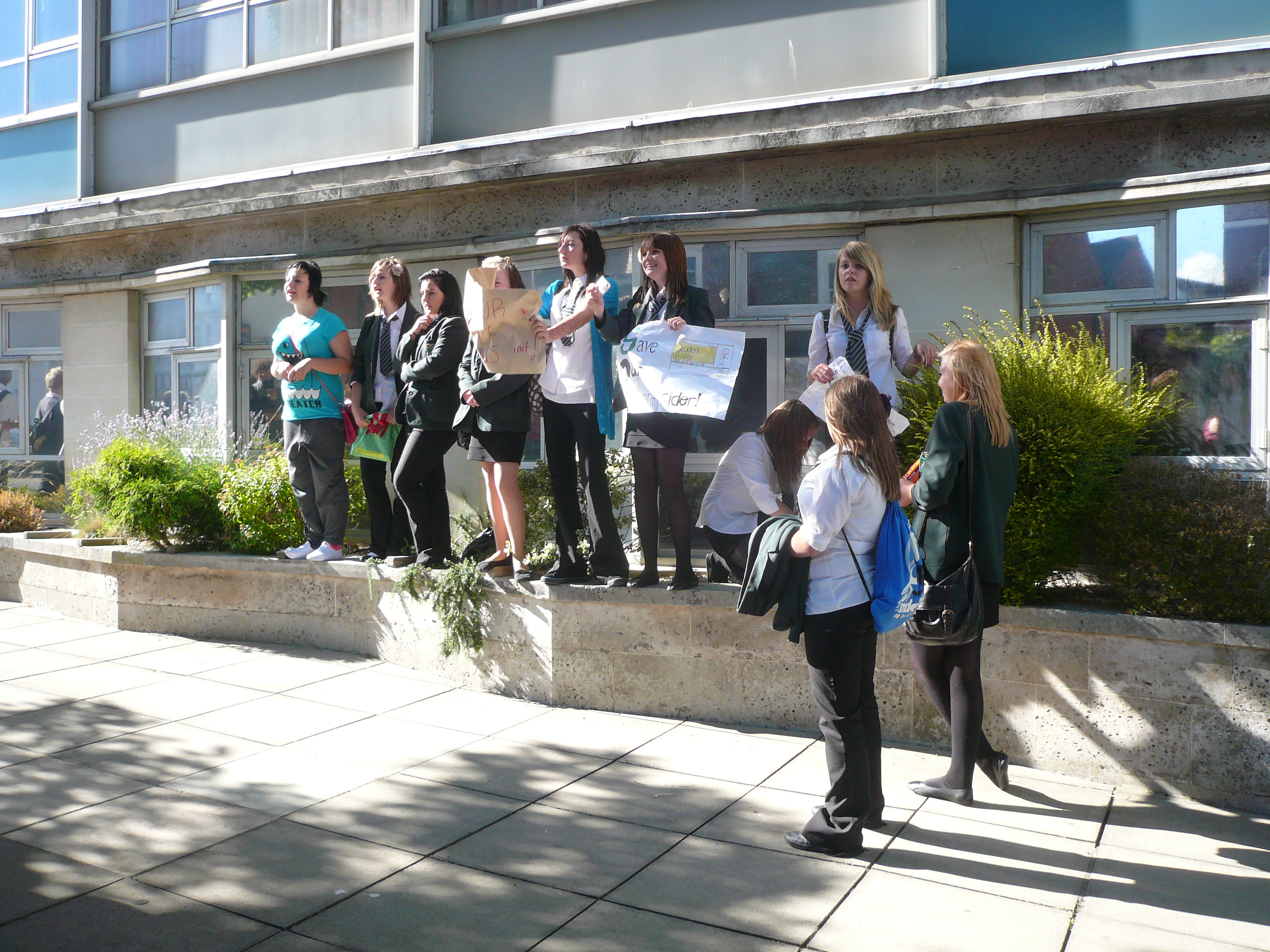
Students demonstrating shortly before the Student Rider was scrapped by the Isle of Wight Council.

Students under the age of 19, in full-time education on the Isle of Wight previously received discount fares through a "Student Rider" scheme. Initially, students could pay 50p for a single journey on any of the Island's buses or trains anywhere, at any time. This included through journeys where all buses are run solely by one company, either Wightbus or Southern Vectis. However this was later increased to £1 per journey, and later £1.20 after the unprecedented success of the scheme lead to the Isle of Wight Council being unable to continue the same level of support. In July 2010 after cuts in funding from central government to local authorities nationwide, it was recommended that the scheme should be axed. Protests were launched on the day of the meeting with over 100 students demonstrating outside County Hall. Despite this, the council still voted to scrap the scheme from September.

Anyone with an over 60 or disability bus pass, is able to travel on the Island's buses for free, under the Government's scheme. These subsidised fares resulted in a boom in passengers using the buses.

== See also ==
- List of bus operators of the United Kingdom
