= Red Hill =

Red Hill may refer to:

== Places ==
=== Australia ===
- Red Hill, Queensland, a suburb of Brisbane
- Red Hill, Queensland (Western Downs Region), a locality
- Red Hill, Victoria
- Red Hill South, Victoria
- Red Hill, Australian Capital Territory
- Red Hill, Western Australia
- Red Hill, Gulgong, New South Wales

=== Canada ===
- Red Hill Valley, a valley in Hamilton, Ontario
- Red Hill Creek, a creek in Hamilton, Ontario

=== New Zealand ===
- Red Hill, New Zealand a suburb of Auckland in North Island
- Maungakura / Red Hill, a mountain in the South Island

=== United Kingdom ===
==== Natural formations ====
- Red Hill (salt making), an archaeological feature found in south-east England associated with ancient salt production
- Red Hill, Hampshire, England
- Red Hill, Lincolnshire, England, a Wildlife Trust nature reserve

=== Inhabited places ===
- Red Hill, Bournemouth, England, a location in the United Kingdom
- Red Hill, Herefordshire, England, a place in Herefordshire
- Red Hill, Kent, England, location in the United Kingdom
- Red Hill, Leicestershire, England, location in the United Kingdom
- Red Hill, London, a place near Chislehurst in the London Borough of Bromley
- Red Hill, Pembrokeshire, Wales, a location in the United Kingdom
- Red Hill, Warwickshire, England, a location in the United Kingdom
- Red Hill, West Yorkshire, England, a location in the United Kingdom
- Red Hill, Worcester, England

=== United States ===
==== Natural formations ====
- Red Hill (Merced County), a summit in the Diablo Range of California
- Red Hill (Ulster County, New York), a mountain
- Red Island Volcano, California
- Red Hill shale, roadcut exposure in Catskill Formation, Pennsylvania

==== Inhabited places ====
- A community in North Tustin, California
- Red Hill, Indiana
- Red Hill, Kentucky
- Red Hill, New Jersey
- Red Hill, Pennsylvania, in Montgomery County
- Red Hill, Blair County, Pennsylvania
- Red Hill, South Carolina
- Red Hill, West Virginia

==== Other places in the United States ====
- Red Hill (Bullock, North Carolina), an historic plantation
- Red Hill (Los Angeles), nickname for Elysian Heights neighborhood of Los Angeles
- Red Hill, New Mexico, a ghost town
- Red Hill Douglas County, Oregon AVA, Oregon wine region
- Red Hill Fire Observation Station, a fire tower on top of Red Hill, New York
- Red Hill Patrick Henry National Memorial, plantation house in Virginia
- Red Hill, Hawaiʻi, site of the US Navy Red Hill Underground Fuel Storage Facility
- Red Hill Syenite, a geologic formation near Plymouth, New Hampshire

=== In other countries ===
- Red Hill, Trinidad and Tobago, a town in Trinidad
- Pukekiwiriki, a hill in the Auckland Region of New Zealand, also known as Red Hill
- Red Hill (Hong Kong), a hill in Hong Kong. The Redhill Peninsula private housing estate is built on its slopes
- Marpo Ri, translated as Red Hill, the hill on which the Potala Palace stands in Lhasa, Tibet, China.

== Entertainment ==
- Red Hill (album), a 2014 album by Wadada Leo Smith, Jamie Saft, Joe Morris and Balázs Pándi
- Red Hill (film), a 2010 Australian film
- Red Hill (TV series), a 2018 Armenian television series
- Red Hill Records, a former Christian record label

== People ==
- William "Red" Hill Sr. (1888–1942), Canadian daredevil and river rescuer in Niagara Falls, Ontario, Canada

== Other uses ==
- Red Hill water crisis, an environmental disaster originating from the Red Hill Underground Fuel Storage Facility in Hawaiʻi

== See also ==
- Redhill (disambiguation)
- Red Hills (disambiguation)
