= Red Hill Pass =

Red Hill Pass may refer to:

- Red Hill Pass (Arizona), United States
- Red Hill Pass (Colorado), United States
- Red Hill Pass (Eastern Cape pass), South Africa

== See also ==
- Red Hill (disambiguation)
- List of mountain passes
