= Moortown =

Moortown may refer to:

- Moortown, Leeds, a suburb of Leeds, England
  - Moortown (ward), an electoral ward of Leeds City Council
- Moortown, Lincolnshire, England, a hamlet
- Moortown, County Tyrone, a small village in Northern Ireland
- Moortown, Isle of Wight, England, part of the village of Brighstone
