= Reen (given name) =

Reen is a given name. Notable people with the name include:

- Reen Kachere (1954–2022), Malawian politician
- Reen Nalli (born 1951), American music executive
- Reen Yu (born 1987), Taiwanese actress and model

== See also ==
- Reem (given name)
- Reen Manor
