= All Saints' Church, Gurnard =

Coordinates: 50°45′15″N 01°19′12″W

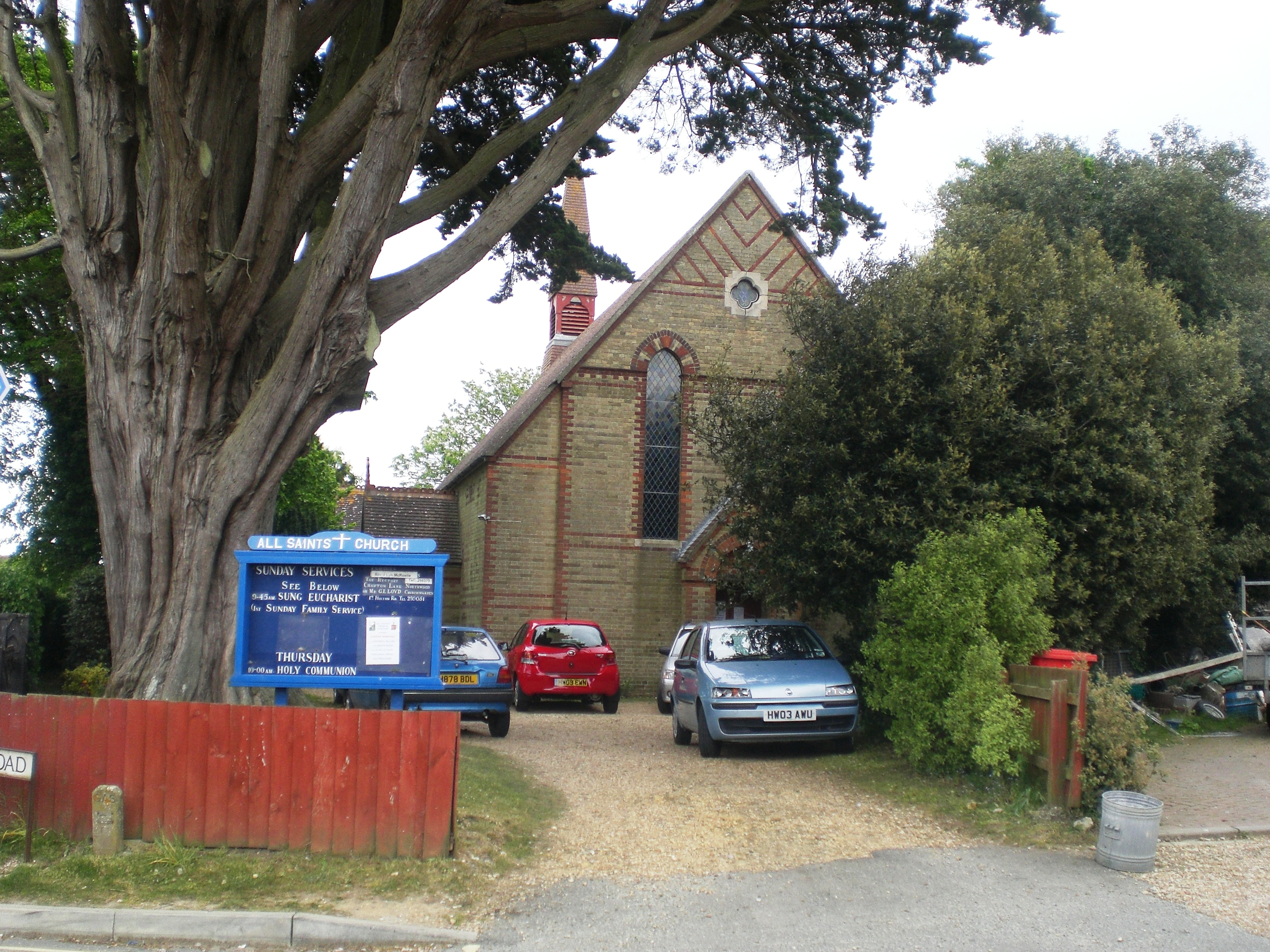
- All Saints' Church, Gurnard.
- All Saints' Church, Gurnard
- Denomination: Church of England
- Churchmanship: Broad Church
- Website: www.gurnardpc.co.uk/churches.aspx

History
- Dedication: All Saints

Administration
- Province: Canterbury
- Diocese: Portsmouth
- Parish: Gurnard, Isle of Wight

All Saints' Church, Gurnard is a parish church in the Church of England located in Gurnard, Isle of Wight.

== History ==
The church dates from 1892 and 1893 by the architect E. P. Loftus Brock. The foundation stone was laid by Captain Thomas Keith Hudson in 1892, and it was consecrated by Anthony Wilson Thorold the Bishop of Winchester in 1893.

== Organ ==
The church has a pipe organ by Gray & Davison dating from 1897. A specification of the organ can be found on the National Pipe Organ Register.

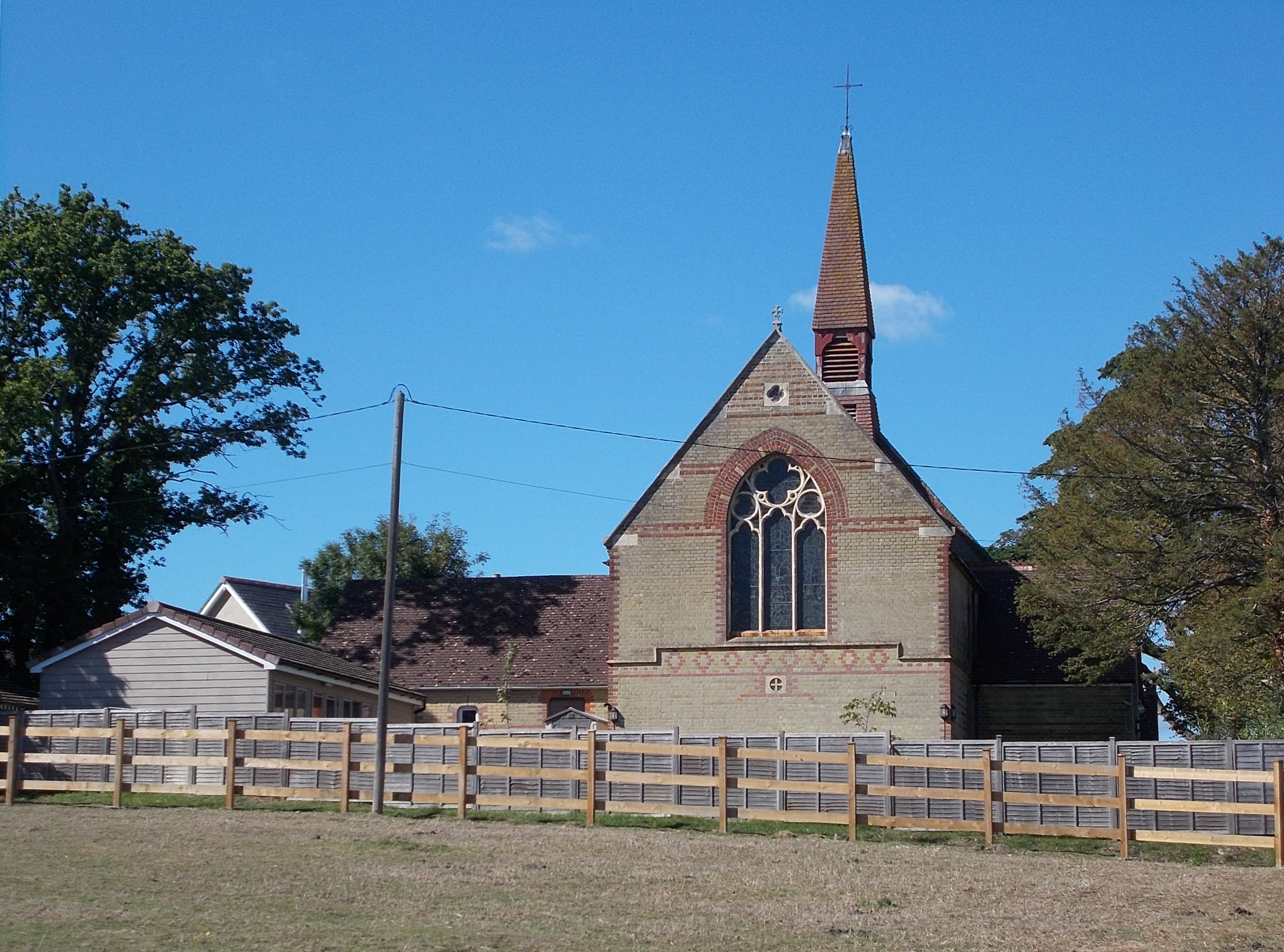
East face of the church.
