= Thorness Bay =

Bay on the Isle of Wight, England

- Site of Special Scientific Interest
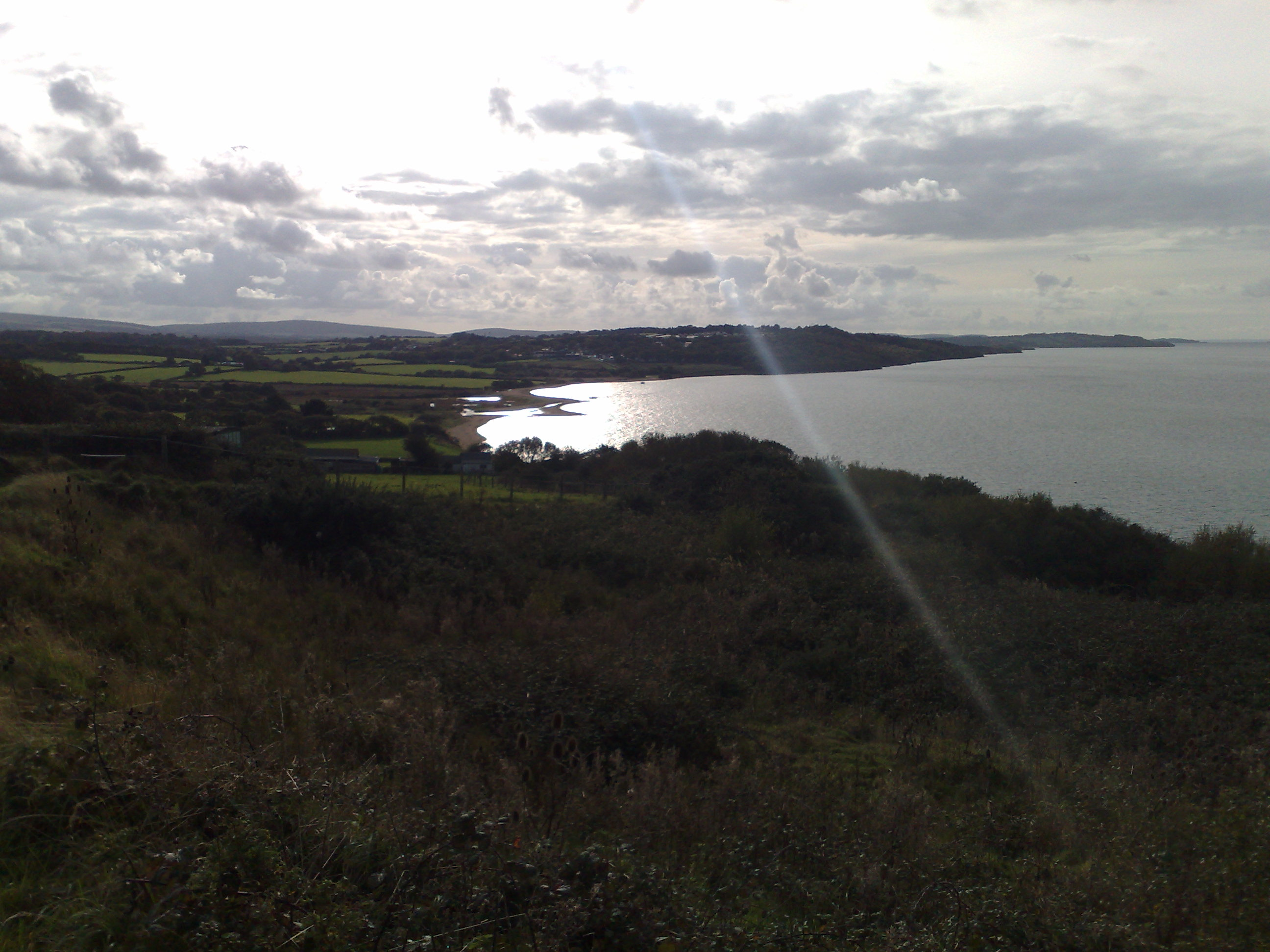
- Thorness Bay looking southwest

- Location within Isle of Wight
- Location of Thorness Bay.
- Area of search: Isle of Wight
- Grid reference: SZ455935
- Coordinates: 50°44′30″N 1°21′21″W
- Interest: Biological and Geological
- Area: 213 acres (86.2 ha)
- Notification date: 1966

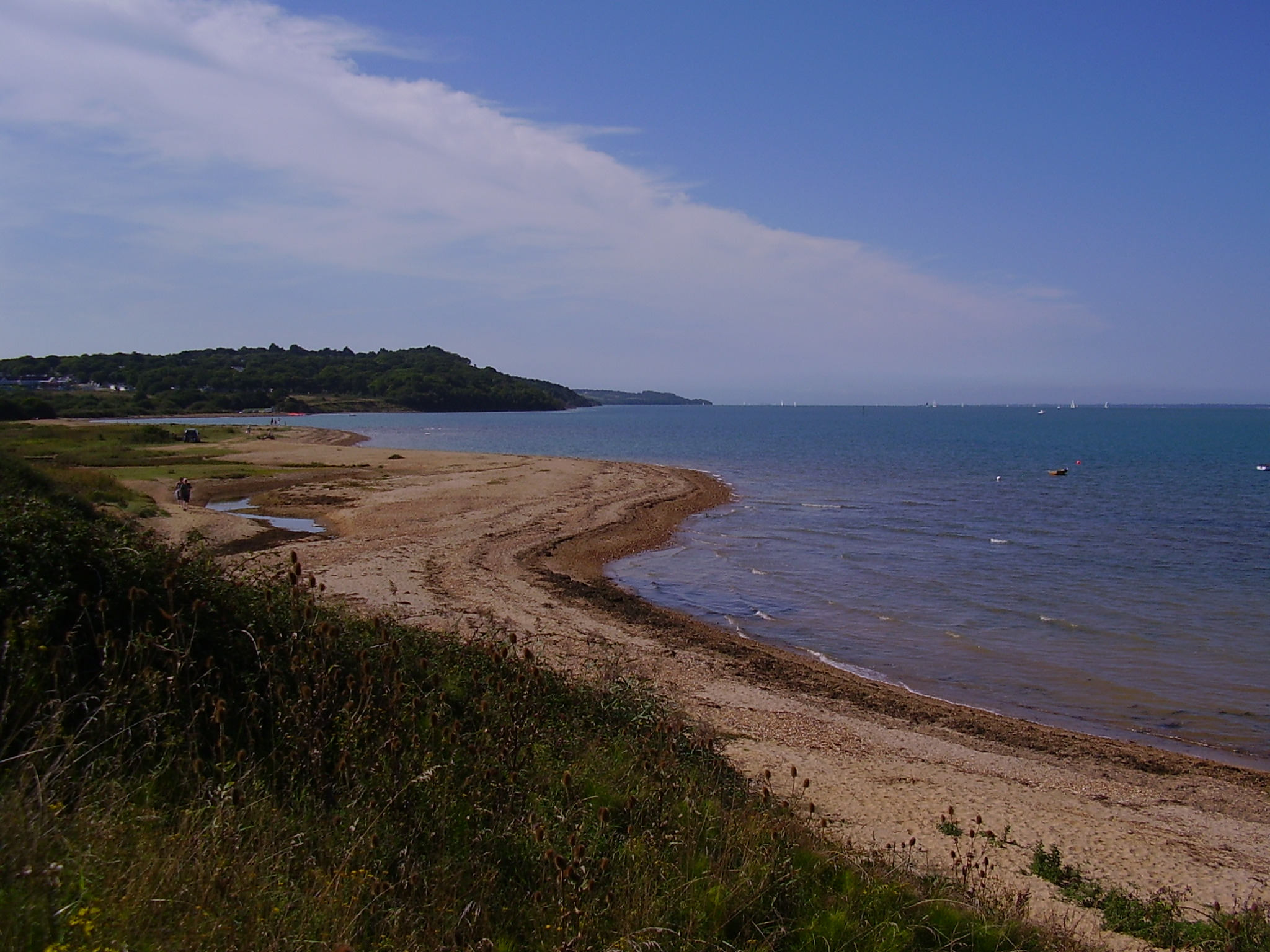
The beach at Thorness Bay

Thorness Bay is an 213-acre (86.2-hectare) Site of special scientific interest which is located on the north-west coast of the Isle of Wight, England, in the western arm of the Solent. The site was notified in 1966 for both its biological and geological features. The bay stretches about 2 miles (3.2 km) from Salt Mead Ledge in the west to Gurnard Head Nr. Gurnard Bay to the east.

The boundaries of Thorness Bay SSSI are contiguous with Newton Harbour SSSI and so this protected area is part of a wider area of nature protection.

The sea bed is a mixture of mud, sand and shingle with rocky outcrops of Bembridge Limestone. The soft cliffs of the bay contain the Bembridge Insect Bed, where fossilized plants and insects have been discovered. Over 200 insect species have been recorded in this area.

A small unnamed brook enters the sea in the middle of the bay after passing through a marsh.

Little Thorness Farm, a beef farm near the bay has 18 acres (7.3 ha) of protected marshland under stewardship and is a SSSI because it is home to wildlife not found in other areas.

== Name ==
Its name means "the thorn-tree hedge or enclosure", coming from the Old English thorn and hege or hæg.

1198 - 1216: Torneyam

1285: Thorneye

1324: Thornheye

1395: Thorney Bay

1769: Thorness Bay

1781: Thorness Bay

== Holiday Park ==
Thorness Bay also has a holiday park run by Parkdean Resorts. It has a direct footpath leading straight to the beach.

== Land ownership ==
Institutional landowners that own land within Thorness Bay SSSI include the Crown Estate, the National Trust and the Ministry of Defence.
