= Gurnard Bay =

Coordinates: 50°45′54″N 1°19′48″W

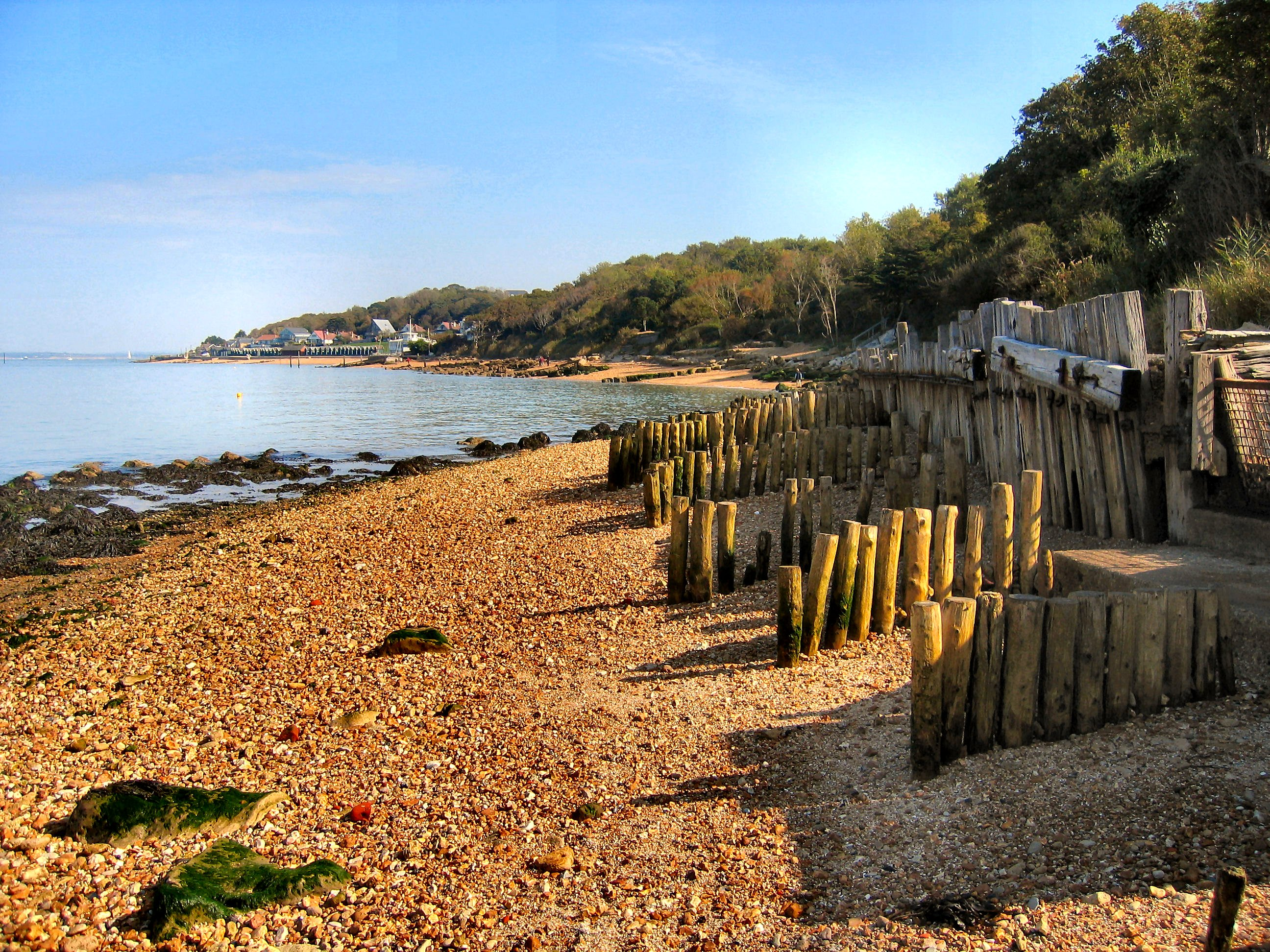
- Gurnard Bay with the village of Gurnard is seen in the distance.

- Location within the Isle of Wight
- Civil parish: Gurnard
- Ceremonial county: Isle of Wight
- Region: South East
- Country: England
- Sovereign state: United Kingdom
- UK Parliament: Isle of Wight West

Gurnard Bay is a bay on the north-west coast of the Isle of Wight, England, in the western arm of the Solent. It lies to the north-west of the village of Gurnard from which it takes its name. Its shoreline is 1 1/4 miles (2.0 km) in length and is gently curving. It stretches from Gurnard Head in the west to Egypt Point to the east. A panoramic view of the bay and the village of Gurnard can be seen from ferries approaching Cowes or East Cowes from the Solent. There is a pebble and shingle beach on the bay which is bordered by a row of municipally owned beach huts. Watersports are popular pastimes in the bay, and the Gurnard Sailing Club is located at its eastern end.

The bay is best viewed and accessed from the green at Gurnard.

== Geography ==
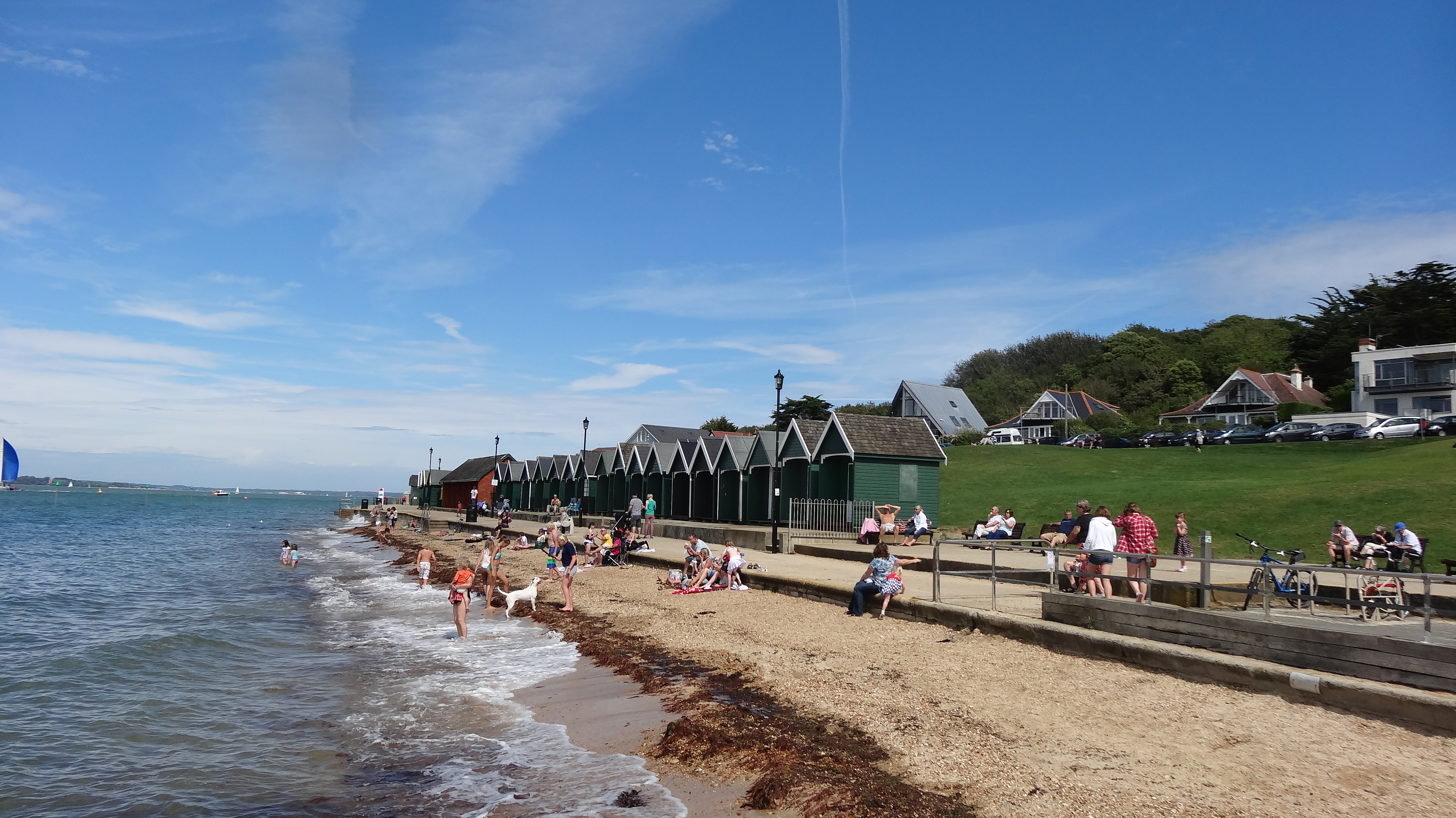
Gurnard Beach with its beach huts

The seabed is a mixture of mud and sand and is home to Gurnard Ledge, a clay and limestone reef which is a danger to marine traffic and marked with a buoy.

A small brook called Gurnard Luck enters the bay at the south-western end, and its estuary is used as a small harbour for small fishing vessels. In the past, it was believed escaped prisoners sometimes made for the Luck to commandeer vessels and escape to the mainland.

Historically, the land to the west of Gurnard Marsh extended much further into the sea and formed a significant headland, however, in recent centuries has been significantly destroyed by erosion.

== History ==
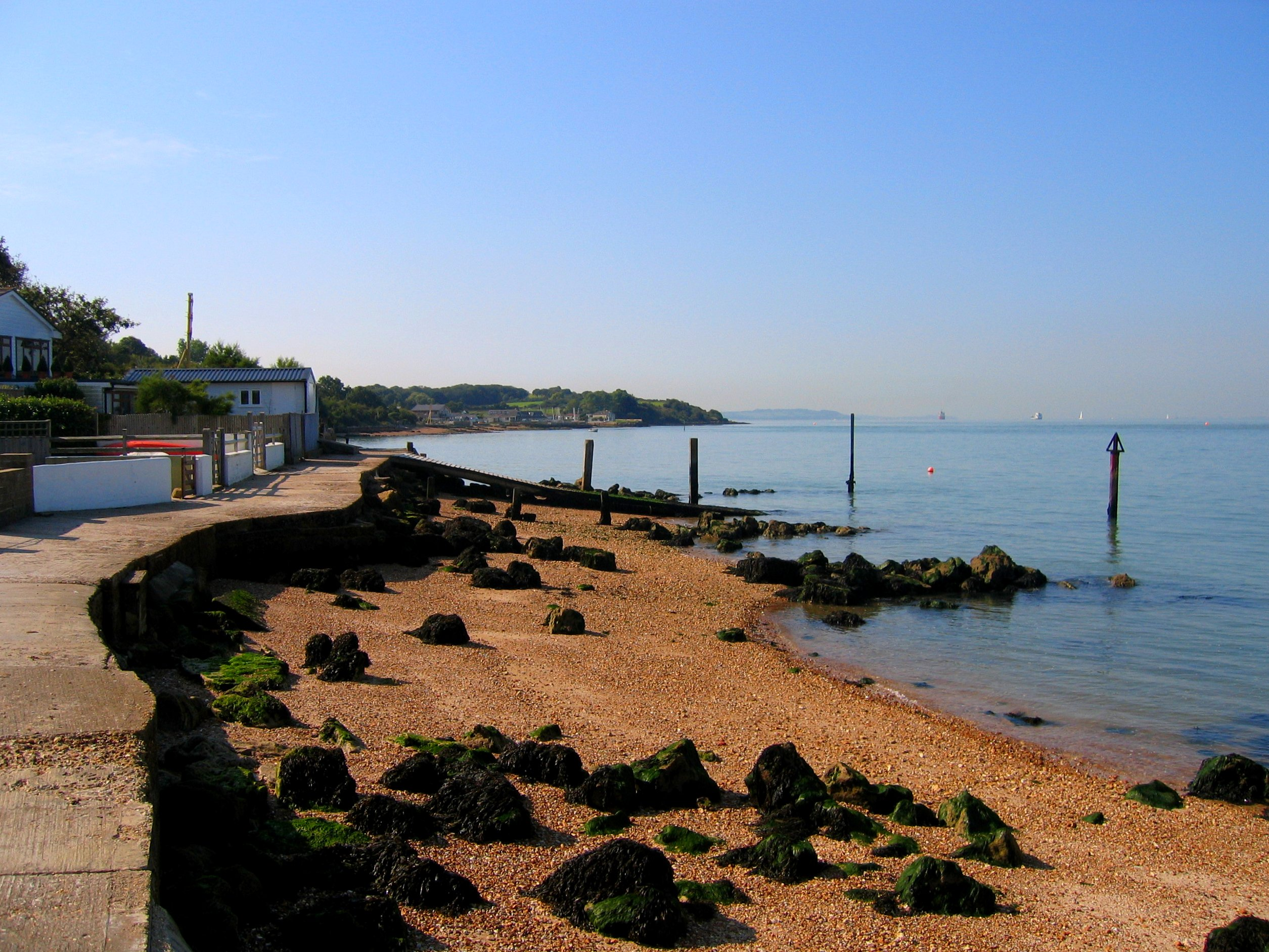
The bay looking toward Gurnard Marsh

On the former land to the west of Gurnard Marsh was one of the island's main harbours for "common passage" to the mainland. Protecting the harbour stood Gurnard Fort, built around 1600, however by the 17th century it was abandoned as Cowes had then rapidly grown to be the main commercial port for the island. The remains of the fort were rediscovered in 1864, during an excavation of a Roman villa which stood on the same site, the area on which they stood has now since been destroyed by the sea and lies some distance into the bay.

The wreckage of a downed World War II German bomber lies in the bay not too far from Egypt Point.
