= Red Hill, West Virginia =

Red Hill
- Unincorporated community
- Location within the state of West Virginia
- Coordinates: 39°14′52″N 81°28′26″W
- Country: United States
- State: West Virginia
- County: Wood
- Elevation: 932 ft (284 m)
- Time zone: UTC-5 (Eastern (EST))
  - Summer (DST): UTC-4 (EDT)
- GNIS ID: 1560486

Red Hill is an unincorporated community in Wood County, West Virginia, United States.
