= Rescassa =

Coordinates: 50.247°N 4.832°W

- Location within Cornwall
- OS grid reference: SW982425
- Unitary authority: Cornwall
- Ceremonial county: Cornwall
- Region: South West
- Country: England
- Sovereign state: United Kingdom

Rescassa is a hamlet near Mevagissey in Cornwall, England.
