= Rejerrah =

Coordinates: 50.364°N 5.092°W

Rejerrah: Cornish: Resworow
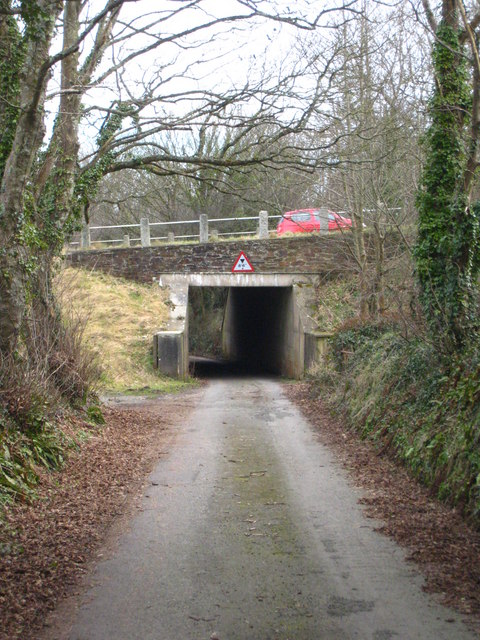
- The A3075 overbridge at Rejerrah

- Location within Cornwall
- OS grid reference: SW802561
- Unitary authority: Cornwall
- Ceremonial county: Cornwall
- Region: South West
- Country: England
- Sovereign state: United Kingdom

Rejerrah (Cornish: Resworow) is a hamlet located near Cubert in Cornwall, England. It is situated to the east of the A3075 main road.
