= Redford, Dorset =

Hamlet in Dorset, England

Coordinates: 50.847°N 2.561°W

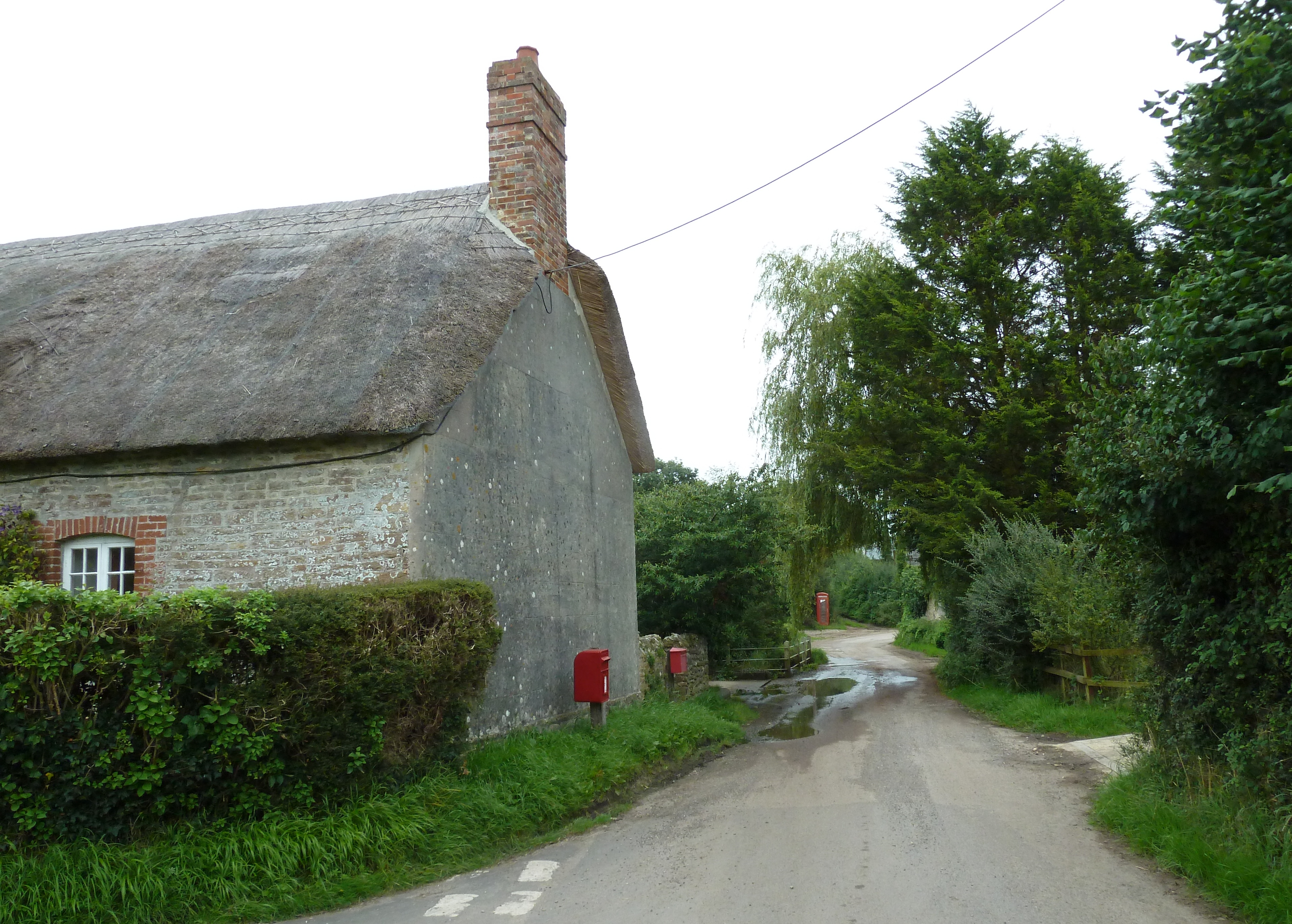
Rush hour in Redford

Redford is a hamlet about equidistant from Batcombe, Melbury Bubb and Woolcombe in the county of Dorset in South West England. It lies within the Dorset unitary authority administrative area of the county, eight miles south of the town of Sherborne.
