= Rew Street =

Coordinates: 50.74545°N 1.33391°W

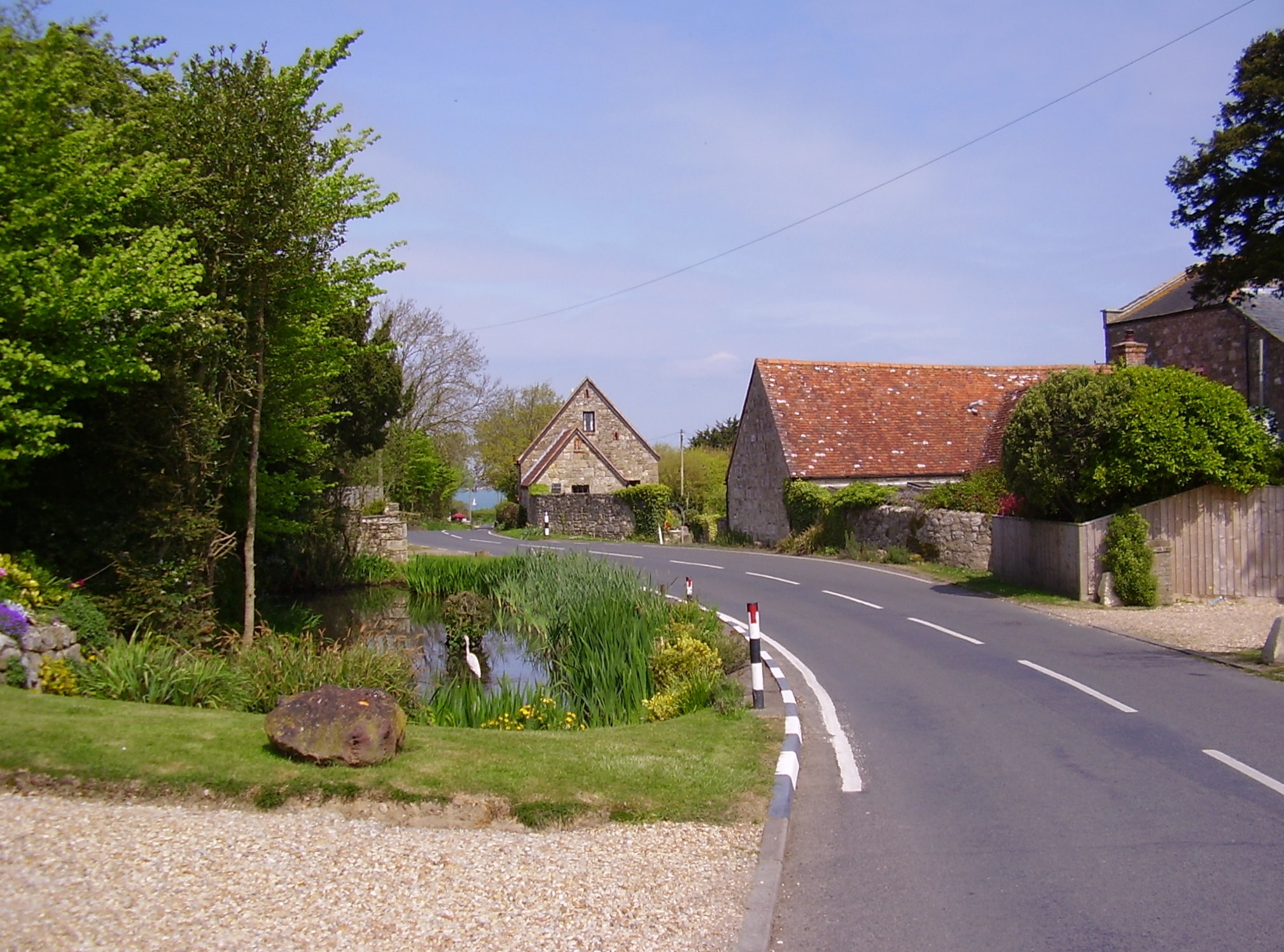
- The road through Rew Street

- Location within the Isle of Wight
- OS grid reference: SZ470941
- Civil parish: Gurnard
- Unitary authority: Isle of Wight
- Ceremonial county: Isle of Wight
- Region: South East
- Country: England
- Sovereign state: United Kingdom
- Post town: COWES
- Postcode district: PO31
- Dialling code: 01983
- Police: Hampshire and Isle of Wight
- Fire: Hampshire and Isle of Wight
- Ambulance: Isle of Wight
- UK Parliament: Isle of Wight West

Rew Street is a village on the Isle of Wight. It is located three kilometres southwest of Cowes in the north of the island. The village lies along the main road between Porchfield and Gurnard (where the 2011 Census population was included) and consists of several farming communities. As a result, many of the houses in the area have been converted from old barns.

== Name ==
The name means 'the street or hamlet with a row of trees or houses', from Old English rǣw and strǣt.

14th century: Rewestret

1708: Rewstreete

1781: Rue Street
