= Resaurie =

Coordinates: 57.47879°N 4.15017°W

Resaurie: Scottish Gaelic: Ruigh Samhraidh
- Location within the Inverness area
- OS grid reference: NH711452
- Council area: Highland
- Country: Scotland
- Sovereign state: United Kingdom
- Post town: Inverness
- Postcode district: IV2 7
- Police: Scotland
- Fire: Scottish
- Ambulance: Scottish

Resaurie is a village, that lies between Culloden and Westhill in Inverness-shire, Scottish Highlands and is in the Scottish council area of Highland. The name "Resaurie" refers to summer pasture in Scottish Gaelic.
