= Redburn, Northumberland =

Village in Northumberland, England

Coordinates: 54.975°N 2.353°W

Redburn
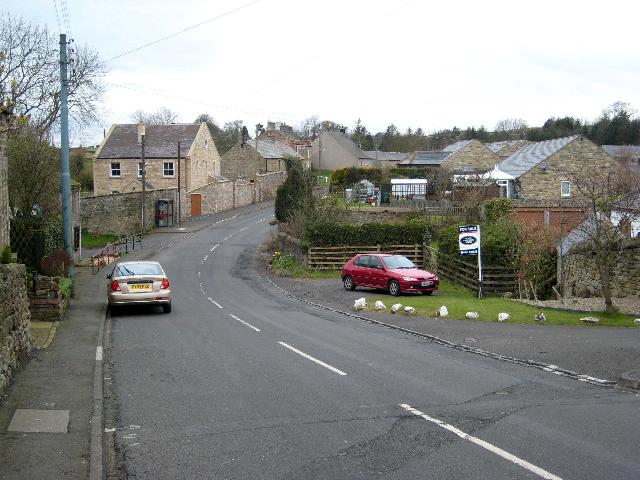

- Location within Northumberland
- OS grid reference: NY775645
- Unitary authority: Northumberland
- Ceremonial county: Northumberland
- Region: North East
- Country: England
- Sovereign state: United Kingdom
- Post town: HEXHAM
- Postcode district: NE47
- Police: Northumbria
- Fire: Northumberland
- Ambulance: North East
- UK Parliament: Hexham

Redburn is a village in Northumberland, England, located about 0.5 miles (0.80 km) west of Bardon Mill. It is situated about 4 miles (6 km) south of Hadrian's Wall.

The most notable feature of Redburn is Redburn Park, which was refurbished in August 2010. It is also the location of a roadside branch of Starbucks and a BP Garage that serve the A69.

== Governance ==
Redburn is in the parliamentary constituency of Hexham.

== See also ==
- Stanegate
