= Rhyd-Rosser =

Village in Ceredigion, Wales

Coordinates: 52.289000°N 4.108171°W

- Location within Ceredigion
- OS grid reference: SN 5631 6774
  - Cardiff: 68.5 mi (110.2 km)
  - London: 178 mi (286 km)
- Community: Llanrhystud
- Principal area: Ceredigion
- Country: Wales
- Sovereign state: United Kingdom
- Post town: Aberystwyth
- Postcode district: SY23
- Police: Dyfed-Powys
- Fire: Mid and West Wales
- Ambulance: Welsh
- UK Parliament: Ceredigion Preseli
- Senedd Cymru – Welsh Parliament: Ceredigion

Rhyd-Rosser (also spelled as Rhydroser) is a hamlet in the community of Llanrhystud, Ceredigion, Wales, which is 68.5 miles (110.3 km) from Cardiff and 178 miles (286.5 km) from London. Rhyd-Rosser is represented in the Senedd by Elin Jones (Plaid Cymru) and is part of the Ceredigion Preseli constituency in the House of Commons.

== See also ==
- List of localities in Wales by population
