= Red Hill Syenite =

- Stratigraphic range: Early Jurassic, ~199–197 Ma

Lithology
- Primary: Syenite
- Other: feldspathoid, granite, feldspar

Location
- Region: White Mountains of New Hampshire
- Country: United States

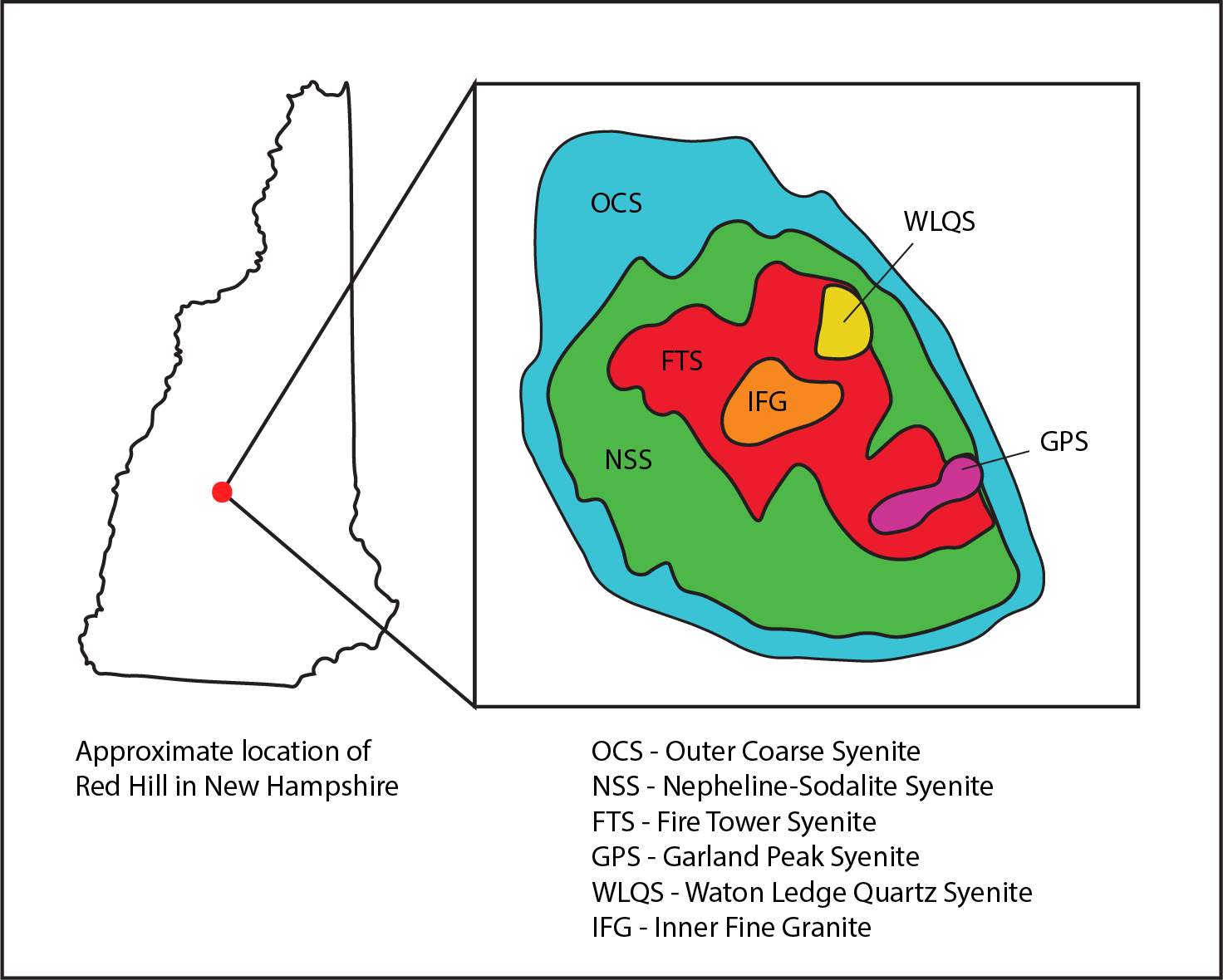
Location of the Red Hill Syenite in New Hampshire, and the geologic units of the Red Hill Syenite. Adapted from File:NHMap-doton-Concord.png and USGS geologic map of New Hampshire

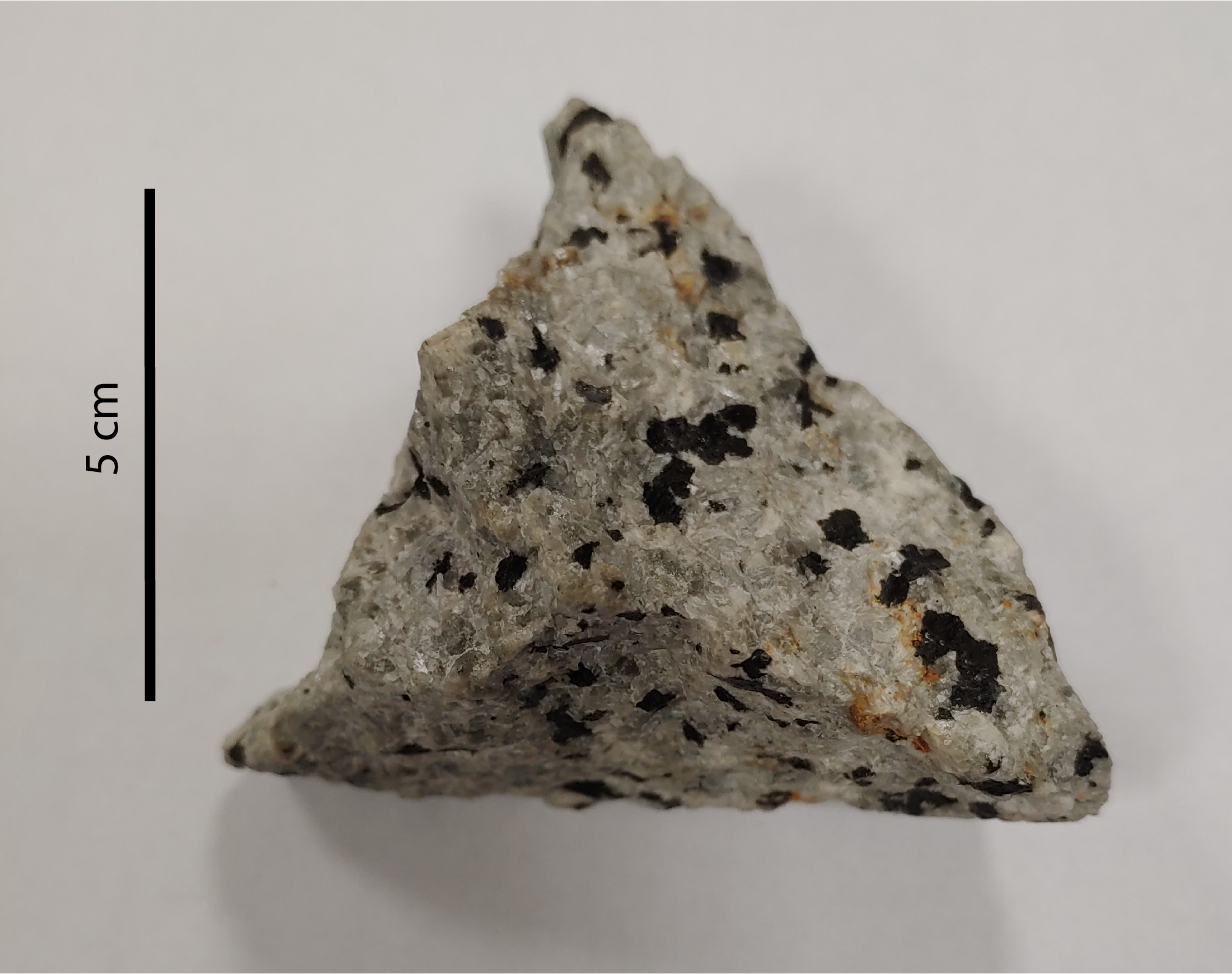
Red Hill Syenite hand sample

The Red Hill Syenite ("Red Hill Syenitic Complex", "Red Hill Alkaline Igneous Complex", "Red Hill Intrusion", or "Red Hill Layered syenitic complex") is a layered igneous rock complex in central New Hampshire, about 20 mi (32 km) east of Plymouth. The Red Hill Syenite is part of the White Mountain magma series, which underlays the White Mountains of New Hampshire. Red Hill is roughly oval-shaped, covers just under 7.7 square miles (20 km^{2}), and has a summit elevation of 2,028 feet (618 m).

The complex is made of six distinct units, the order of intrusion of which was determined by cross-cutting relationships. The units are, in order from oldest to youngest, the Outer Coarse Syenite, the Nepheline Sodalite Syenite, the Fire Tower Syenite, the Garland Peak Syenite, the Watson Ledge Quartz Syenite, and the Interior Fine Granite. The rock complex is between 197-199 million years old, dated to the Early Jurassic epoch, making it one of the oldest sections of the White Mountain magma series. The Interior Fine Granite unit is the youngest, and formed about 10 million years after the rest of the complex.

== Petrology ==
The Red Hill syenite is a medium- to coarse-grained syenite. The six units of the Red Hill Syenite all contain primarily alkali feldspar, with many rocks displaying perthitic igneous texture. The perthites range from microperthite (lamellae barely visible or not visible to the naked eye) to very coarse exsolution textures. Mafic minerals present include amphiboles, biotite, and pyroxenes. Many of the rocks also show evidence of hydrothermal fluid alteration, including coarse-patch perthite, perthite crystals with albite rims, and the recrystallization of mafic minerals.

=== Outer Coarse Syenite ===
The outermost layer, the Outer Coarse Syenite, encircles the entire Red Hill and is separated from the country rock by a zone of breccia composed of both the country rock and the Outer Coarse Syenite rock. The Outer Coarse Syenite is composed of 10-20% mafic minerals and 80-90% perthitic feldspar. The primary mafic mineral is calcic amphibole, or ferrohastingite, and the feldspars show a coarse, braided exsolution pattern.

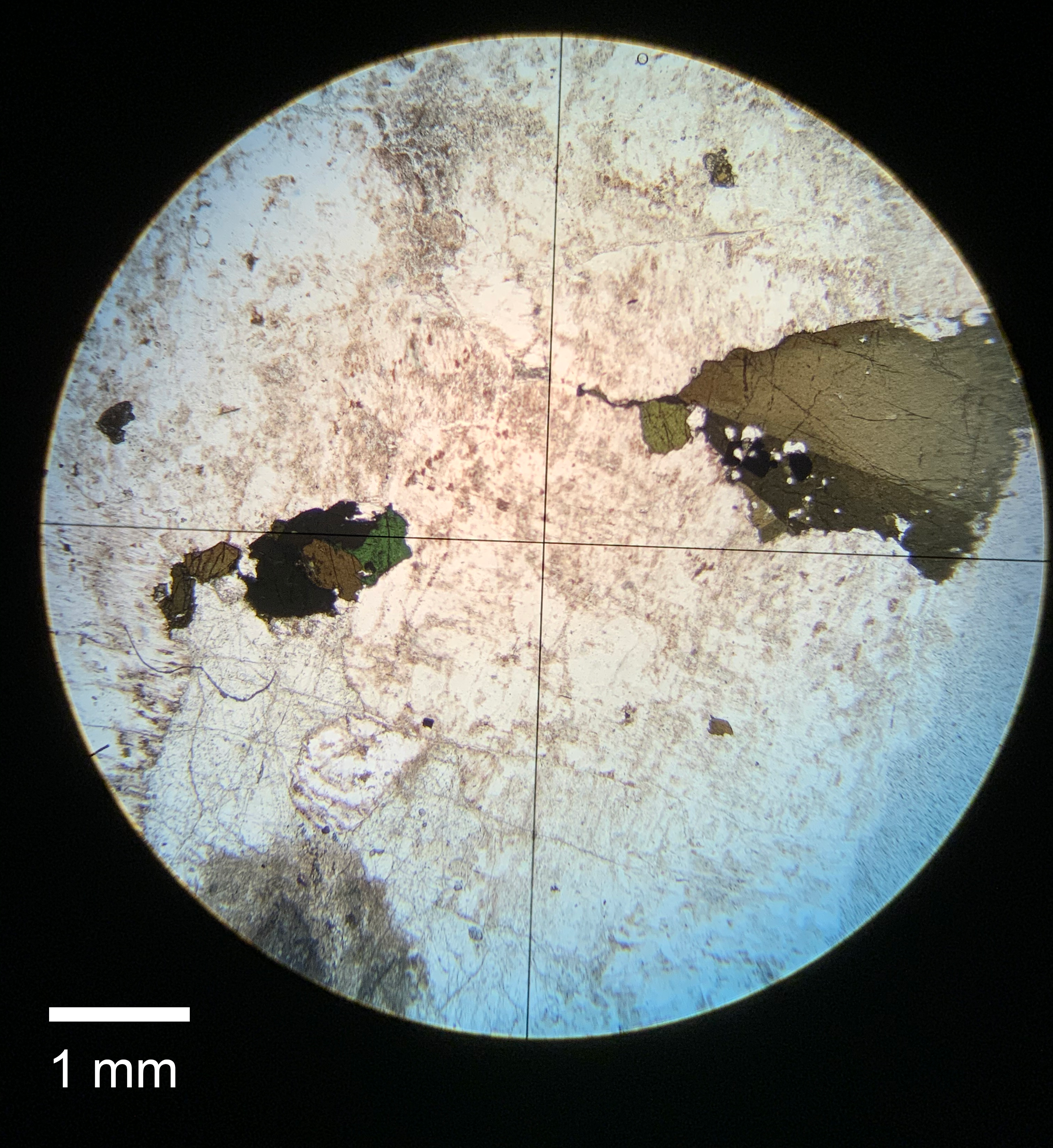
Microphotograph of a thin section from the Red Hill Syenite in PPL

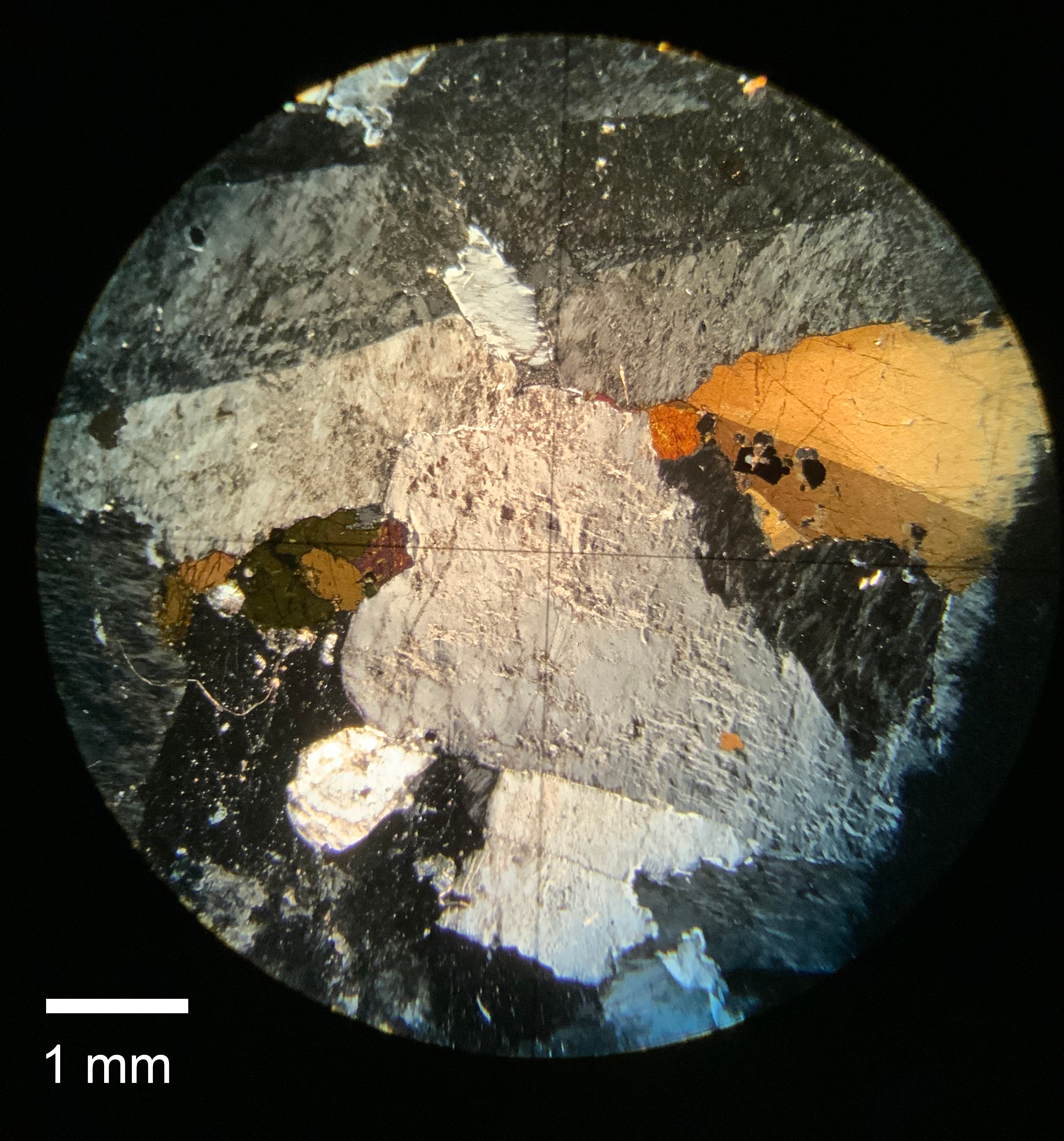
Microphotograph of a thin section from the Red Hill Syenite in XPL

=== Nepheline-Sodalite Syenite ===
Moving inward towards the summit of Red Hill, the next unit is the Nepheline-Sodalite Syenite, the largest of the six units. The composition of the Nepheline-Sodalite Syenite ranges from >5% mafic minerals and 20% feldspathoids (nepheline and sodalite), to 20% mafic minerals and >5% feldspathoids. The remainder of the composition is perthitic feldspar. Thin section microphotographs of the Nepheline-Sodalite Syenite in both PPL and XPL are shown.

=== Fire Tower Syenite ===
The next unit is the Fire Tower Syenite, which is exposed at the summit of the hill in an irregular shape, and is intruded into by the three smallest units. The composition of the Fire Tower Syenite is 85-95% perthitic feldspar and 5-15% mafic minerals. The feldspar has coarse patch-type exsolution, and the mafic minerals are both ferrohastingite and biotite. The mafic minerals in the Outer Coarse Syenite and Nepheline-Sodalite Syenite are irregularly distributed and appear in clusters, but the mafic minerals in the Fire Tower Syenite have a much more even distribution.

=== Garland Peak Syenite, Watson Ledge Quartz Syenite, and Interior Fine Granite ===
The three smallest units are all igneous intrusions that are exposed at the top of the hill within the Fire Tower Syenite. Two of the intrusions also make contact with the Nepheline-Sodalite Syenite, but are primarily contained by the Fire Tower Syenite. The Garland Peak Syenite consists of >15% mafic minerals (needle-shaped amphibole and biotite), 2-6% quartz, 8-15% plagioclase, and 60-70% perthitic feldspar (microperthite). The Garland Peak Syenite also contains occasional pegmatites. The Watson Ledge Quartz Syenite contains >5% quartz, and is very similar to the Fire Tower Syenite, both mineralogically and texturally. The final unit, the Interior Fine Granite, is the youngest unit of the complex, and intruded 10 million years after the rest of the complex, which formed over the course of about 2 million years. The Interior Fine Granite is composed of medium- to fine-grained granite with 20-30% quartz and 50-70% perthitic feldspar.

== Significance ==
The Red Hill Syenite is exceptionally preserved, and its well-exposed and concentric nature makes it easier to study than many other syenitic complexes. By studying the Red Hill Syenite, researchers can make more concrete inferences about igneous textures and cooling history, inferences that can then be applied to other units that exhibit similar textures, but are less exposed or accessible.

Igneous rocks display a variety of textures that can indicate the temperature and speed of magma cooling, among other things. Crystal textures can be assigned to one of five cooling phases, from initial crystallization to post-solidification, and the order, presence, and/or absence of certain textures can be indicative of crystallization history. Syenite is an igneous rock that is particularly well suited to preserving these textures because it has relatively few minerals, high volatile content that favors later reactions, and the crystal accumulation process has a high textural preservation potential.

The Red Hill Syenite displays an abundance of igneous textures, which have been preserved through all stages of magma cooling with little deformation, although there has undoubtedly been some destruction of textures to the continuous intrusion of magma. Textures from early cooling stages display plastic deformation, as they occurred when there was high liquid content in the magma chamber, which allows for crystal movement without breakage. Partial recrystallization occurs in the mid-cooling stages, when large crystals move through the liquid parts of the magma and partially melt, then accumulate more crystal growth with a different geochemistry. In post-solidification stages, the rocks show rigid deformation, including crystal breakage, sharp discontinuities, crush zones, and shear zones. Oftentimes, the formation of the later-stage textures destroys the early-stage textures, but the Red Hill Syenite retained and still displays textures from all phases of cooling.

Another factor that makes the Red Hill Syenite unique is the presence of both silica under-saturated rocks and silica saturated rocks. Typically, feldspathoid minerals (such as nepheline and sodalite) are found in rocks with very low silica content, and these rocks are not quartz-bearing. In the Red Hill complex, there are silica under-saturated syenite units (Outer Coarse Syenite and Nepheline-Sodalite Syenite), silica saturated syenite units (Garland Peak Syenite), and a granitic unit (Inner Fine Granite), which includes quartz (a very silica rich rock).

Red Hill holds researchers' interest as they seek to determine how rocks with such different compositions formed from the same magma. Although rock suites that display discontinuous compositions are often interpreted to have formed from different parent magmas, Red Hill was thought to have formed from the same magma chamber due to geochemical similarities between all syenitic units as well as the concentric formation of the units. One researcher speculated that the compositional difference could be the result of the magma composition being near the Albite-Orthoclase minimum melting temperature and/or fluctuating gas pressure affecting crystallization and re-melting. Another researcher found differences in Rare Earth Elements in apatite from the Outer Coarse Syenite and the Nepheline-Sodalite Syenite, which indicates that they could have come from different parent magmas. They also found geochemical patterns in amphiboles from the Garland Peak Syenite that are not easily explained by the theory of Red Hill having a single magma source.

== Additional reading ==
- Bayley, W. S. (1892). Eleolite-Syenite of Litchfield, Maine, and Hawes' Hornblende-syenite from Red Hill, New Hampshire. Geological Society of America Bulletin, 3(1), 231-252. doi:10.1130/gsab-3-231
- Dorais, M. J. (1993). Pyroxene in enclaves and syenites of the Red Hill complex, New Hampshire: An ion and electron microprobe study. Contributions to Mineralogy and Petrology, 114(1), 130-138. doi:10.1007/bf00307870
- Dorais, M. J. (1998). Mafic enclaves in the Nepheline Sodalite Syenite, Red Hill complex, New Hampshire, U.S.A.: Mineralogical and geochemical evidence for parental magmas. Trends in Mineralogy, 2, 19-37.
- Dorais, M. J., MacRae, N. D., &; Grove, T. (1994). Amphibole zoning in the Garland Peak Syenite, Red Hill complex, New Hampshire: Camptonitic parental magmas and differentiation to silica-oversaturated syenites. Contributions to Mineralogy and Petrology, 117(1), 76-86. doi:10.1007/bf00307731
- Foland, K. A., &; Friedman, I. (1977). Application of Sr and O isotope relations to the petrogenesis of the alkaline rocks of the Red Hill complex, New Hampshire, USA. Contributions to Mineralogy and Petrology, 65(2), 213-225. doi:10.1007/bf00371061
- Quinn, A. (1937). Petrology of the alkaline rocks at Red Hill, New Hampshire. Geological Society of America Bulletin, 48(3), 373-402. doi:10.1130/gsab-48-373
- Wellman, T. R. (1971). Feldspathoidal rocks of the Red Hill Igneous Complex, New Hampshire. The Journal of Geology, 79(5), 621-627. doi:10.1086/627681
