= Redtye =

Coordinates: 50.436°N 4.784°W

- Country: England
- Sovereign state: United Kingdom

Redtye is a hamlet in mid Cornwall, England. Redtye is southwest of Lanivet on the A30 main road.
