= Red Hill Pass (Arizona) =

Landform in Gila County, Arizona

- Location within Arizona
- Elevation: 3,218 feet (981 m)
- Traversed by: Bixby Road

Third Approach
- Location: Arizona; United States
- Coordinates: 33°27′00″N 110°50′02″W
- Topo map: USGS Globe

Red Hill Pass is a mountain pass in Gila County, Arizona. It has an elevation of 3,218 ft (981 m) and is located near the city of Globe.
