= Egypt Point =

Northernmost point of the Isle of Wight, England

Coordinates: 50.76698°N 1.31506°W

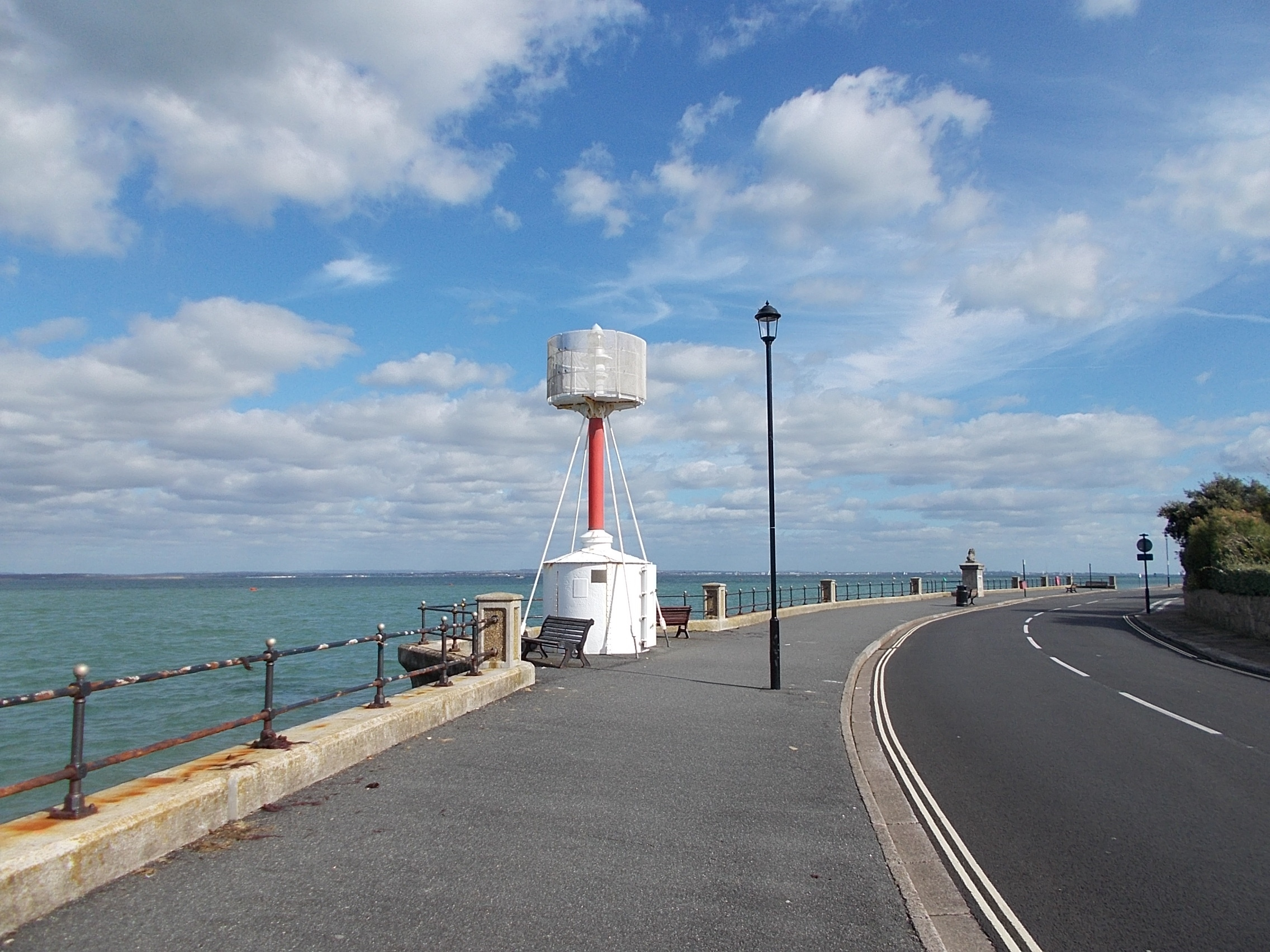
Egypt Point

Egypt Point is the northernmost point of the island county of the Isle of Wight off the south coast of England, and was one of Queen Victoria's favoured places during her time on the island. According to the Post Office at the 2011 Census the point population was included in the civil parish of Northwood, Isle of Wight.

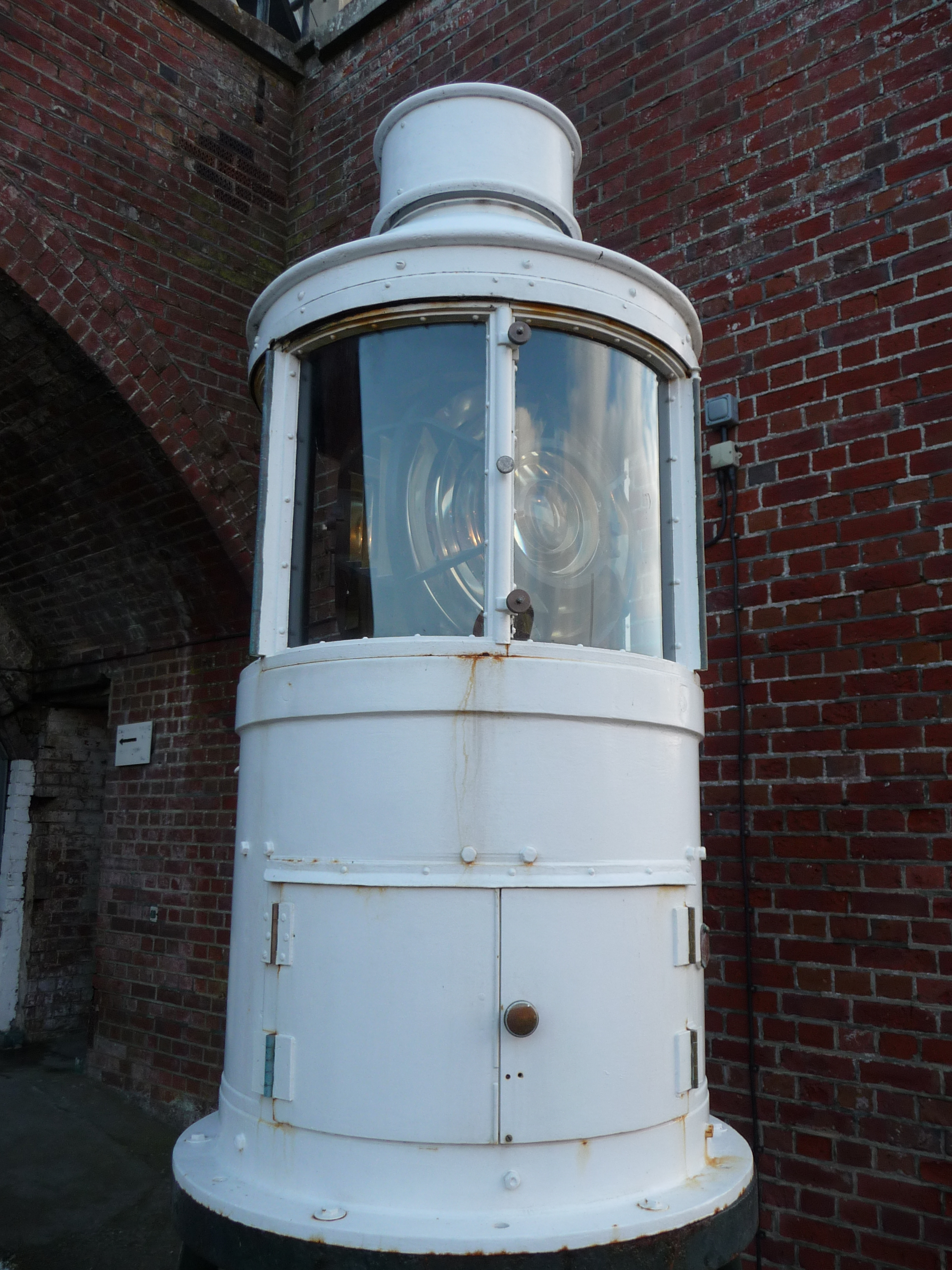
Original optic, removed in 1969, now on display at Hurst Castle

Egypt Point lies in between the town of Cowes and the village of Gurnard. Between 1897 and 1989 a lighthouse was maintained there by Trinity House. It flashed white every ten seconds, with a range of 10 nautical miles (19 km; 12 mi). Initially lit by paraffin, in 1925 it was converted to run automatically on acetylene; then in 1969 it was converted to run on electricity. In 1989 the 'changing requirements of the Mariner' led to the light being decommissioned. Though the light no longer functions, the structure remains a landmark for yachtsmen. In 1997 ownership was transferred from Trinity House to the new Isle of Wight Council.

Egypt Point derives its name from a nearby gypsy encampment from the 16th century. It is now a popular vantage point for the annual Round the Island Race which starts and ends at Cowes.

== See also ==
- St. Catherine's Point
