= Rearquhar =

Coordinates: 57.90587°N 4.12554°W

- Location within the Sutherland area
- OS grid reference: NH741927
- Council area: Highland
- Lieutenancy area: Sutherland
- Country: Scotland
- Sovereign state: United Kingdom
- Post town: Dornoch
- Postcode district: IV25 3
- Police: Scotland
- Fire: Scottish
- Ambulance: Scottish

Rearquhar is a township, which lies in the valley of the River Evelix, 4 miles (6 km) northwest from Dornoch, in Sutherland, Scottish Highlands and is in the Scottish council area of Highland.
