= Moortown, Isle of Wight =

Coordinates: 50.647697°N 1.398098°W

Moortown
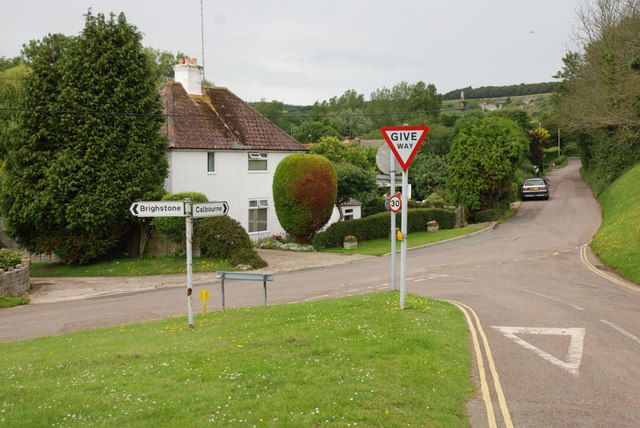
- Moortown

- Location within the Isle of Wight
- OS grid reference: SZ425833
- Civil parish: Brighstone
- Unitary authority: Isle of Wight
- Ceremonial county: Isle of Wight
- Region: South East
- Country: England
- Sovereign state: United Kingdom
- Post town: VENTNOR
- Postcode district: PO38
- Dialling code: 01983
- Police: Hampshire and Isle of Wight
- Fire: Hampshire and Isle of Wight
- Ambulance: Isle of Wight
- UK Parliament: Isle of Wight West

Moortown is a part of Brighstone on the western side of the Isle of Wight. The area is known as the Back of the Wight.

Before 2011, the only form of public transport to pass through the village was an infrequent Wightbus service 36, connecting the village with Newport and Brighstone. However, this service was discontinued by the Council in September 2011.
