= Reen Manor =

Village in United Kingdom

Coordinates: 50°20′48″N 5°08′08″W

Reen Manor (England)

Reen Manor is a hamlet east of Perranporth in Cornwall, England.
