= Gurnard, Isle of Wight =

Coordinates: 50.755°N 1.321°W

Gurnard
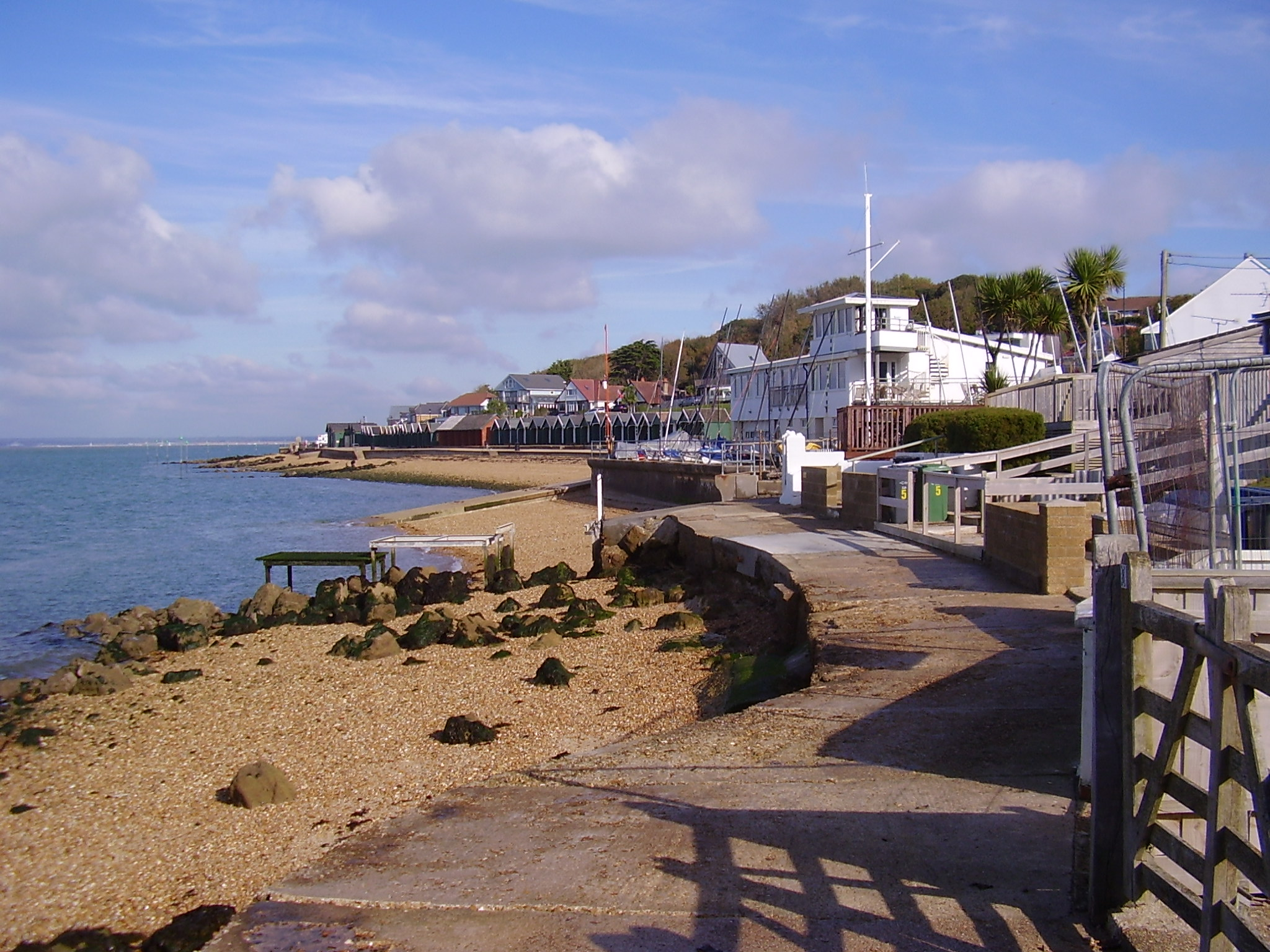
- Gurnard beachfront

- Location within the Isle of Wight
- Area: 4.0863 km^{2} (1.5777 sq mi)
- Population: 1,682 (2011 census including Rew Street)
  - Density: 412/km^{2} (1,070/sq mi)
- OS grid reference: SZ478946
- Civil parish: Gurnard
- Unitary authority: Isle of Wight
- Ceremonial county: Isle of Wight
- Region: South East
- Country: England
- Sovereign state: United Kingdom
- Post town: COWES
- Postcode district: PO31
- Dialling code: 01983
- Police: Hampshire and Isle of Wight
- Fire: Hampshire and Isle of Wight
- Ambulance: Isle of Wight
- UK Parliament: Isle of Wight West

Gurnard is a village and civil parish on the Isle of Wight, two miles to the west of Cowes. Gurnard sits on the edge of Gurnard Bay, enjoyed by the Gurnard Sailing Club.

Gurnard's main street features a pub (Portland Inn), a few shops and a few houses. The west end of the beach is Gurnard Marsh and a stream called "The Luck" which discharges into the Solent.

A fortification known as Gurnard Fort was built on a headland west of Gurnard Marsh about 1600. The land was eroded, however, and all traces disappeared until an archaeological excavation of a Roman villa in 1864 uncovered traces of Gurnard Fort as well.

Gurnard was once a hamlet called Gurnet, from which it draws its name. The hamlet looked across the Solent. Whilst it was established in the 13th century it did not experience growth until the 18th century. Gurnet Bay at the mouth of Gurnard Luck had been to some extent navigable and was the source of transport to the mainland before Cowes took this role.

Transport is provided by Southern Vectis route 32 to and from Cowes, and route 1 to Cowes and Newport, Isle of Wight.

== See also ==
- All Saints' Church, Gurnard
