= The Marriage of Princess Beatrice =

Painting by Richard Caton Woodville Jr.

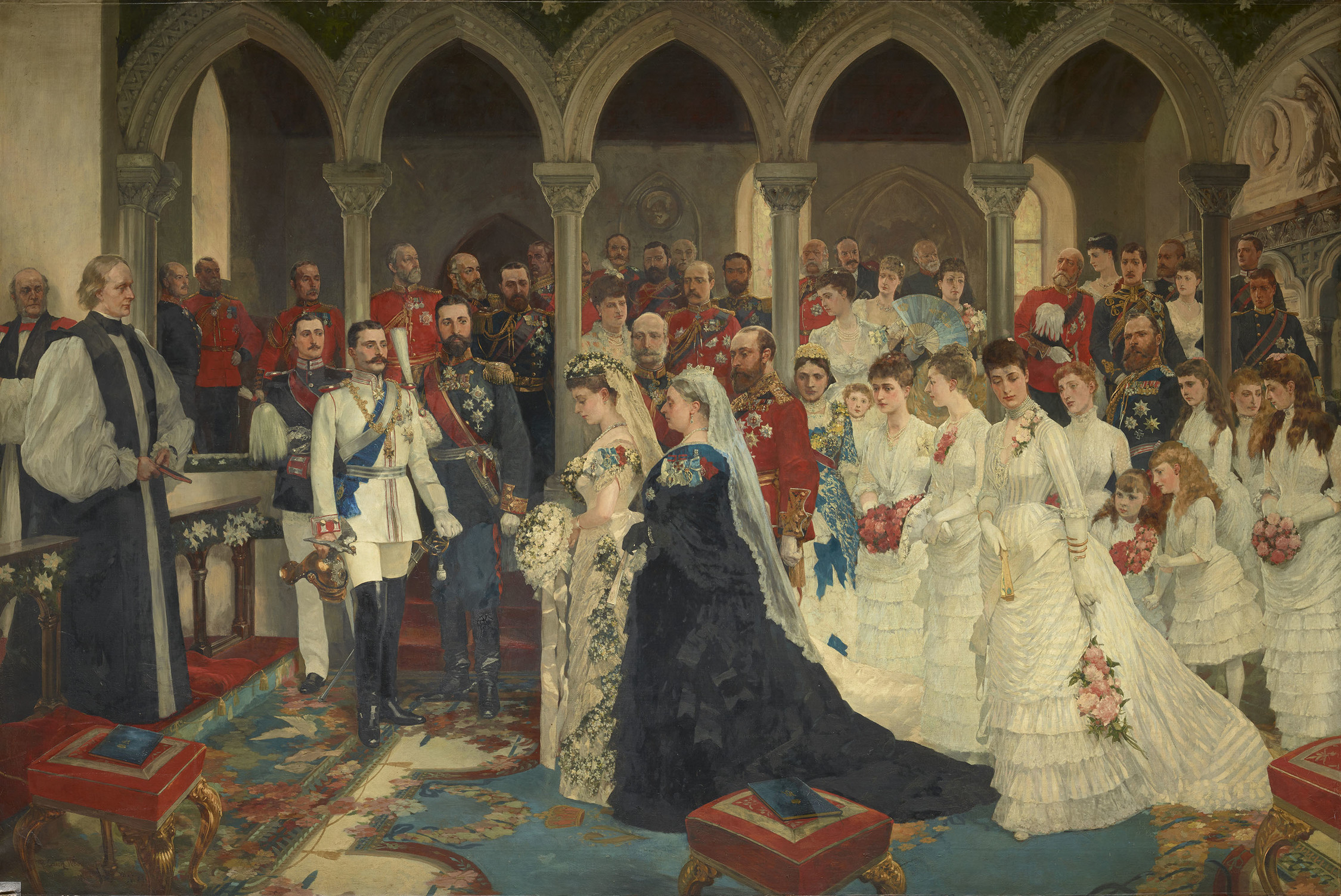
- Artist: Richard Caton Woodville Jr.
- Year: 1886
- Type: Oil on canvas, historical painting
- Dimensions: 122.3 cm × 182.8 cm (48.1 in × 72.0 in)
- Location: Royal Collection

The Marriage of Princess Beatrice is an oil on canvas history painting by the English artist Richard Caton Woodville Jr., from 1886.

== History and description ==
It depicts the wedding of Princess Beatrice of the United Kingdom and Prince Henry of Battenberg at Saint Mildred's Church at Whippingham, near Osborne, on 23 July 1885.

Beatrice was the fifth and youngest daughter of Queen Victoria and Prince Albert. Henry was a son of Prince Alexander of Hesse and by Rhine and Julia, Princess of Battenberg. Queen Victoria consented to the marriage on condition that Henry give up his German commitments and live permanently with Beatrice and the Queen.

The painting was commissioned by Queen Victoria and shows Beatrice accompanied to the altar by the Queen and her brother the Prince of Wales. Eight of Beatrice's nieces, who were her bridesmaids, are also depicted. The portrait was displayed at the Royal Academy Summer Exhibition in 1888.
