= Randonnée =

Randonnée (French for excursion) can refer to:

- Randonneuring, an organized long-distance bicycle ride
- Isle of Wight Randonnée, a yearly cycling event held on the Isle of Wight
- Randonnée skiing, a form of backcountry skiing
