= Isle of Wight Randonnée =

Cycling event on the Isle of Wight, England

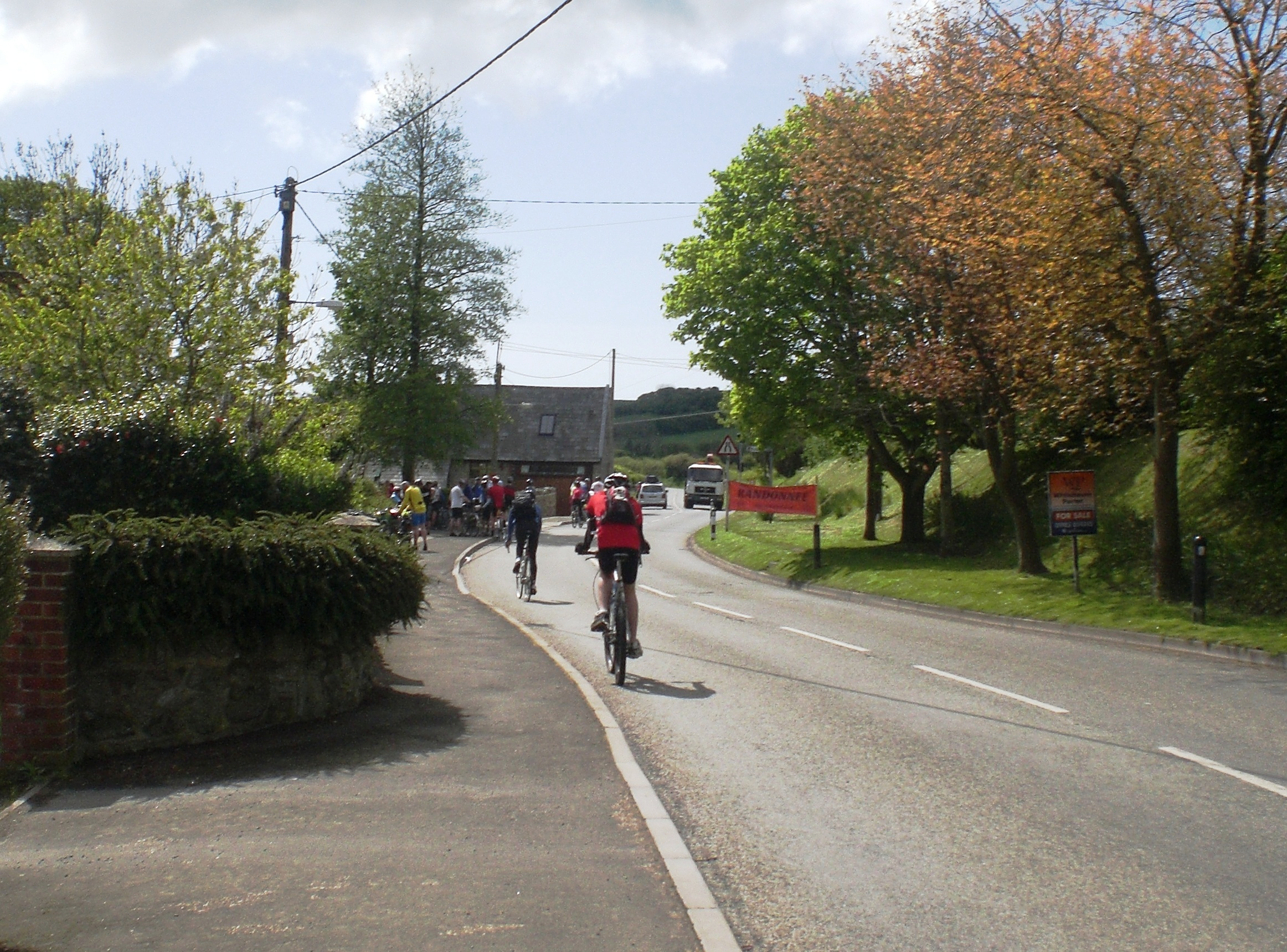
A section of the ride in Whitwell.

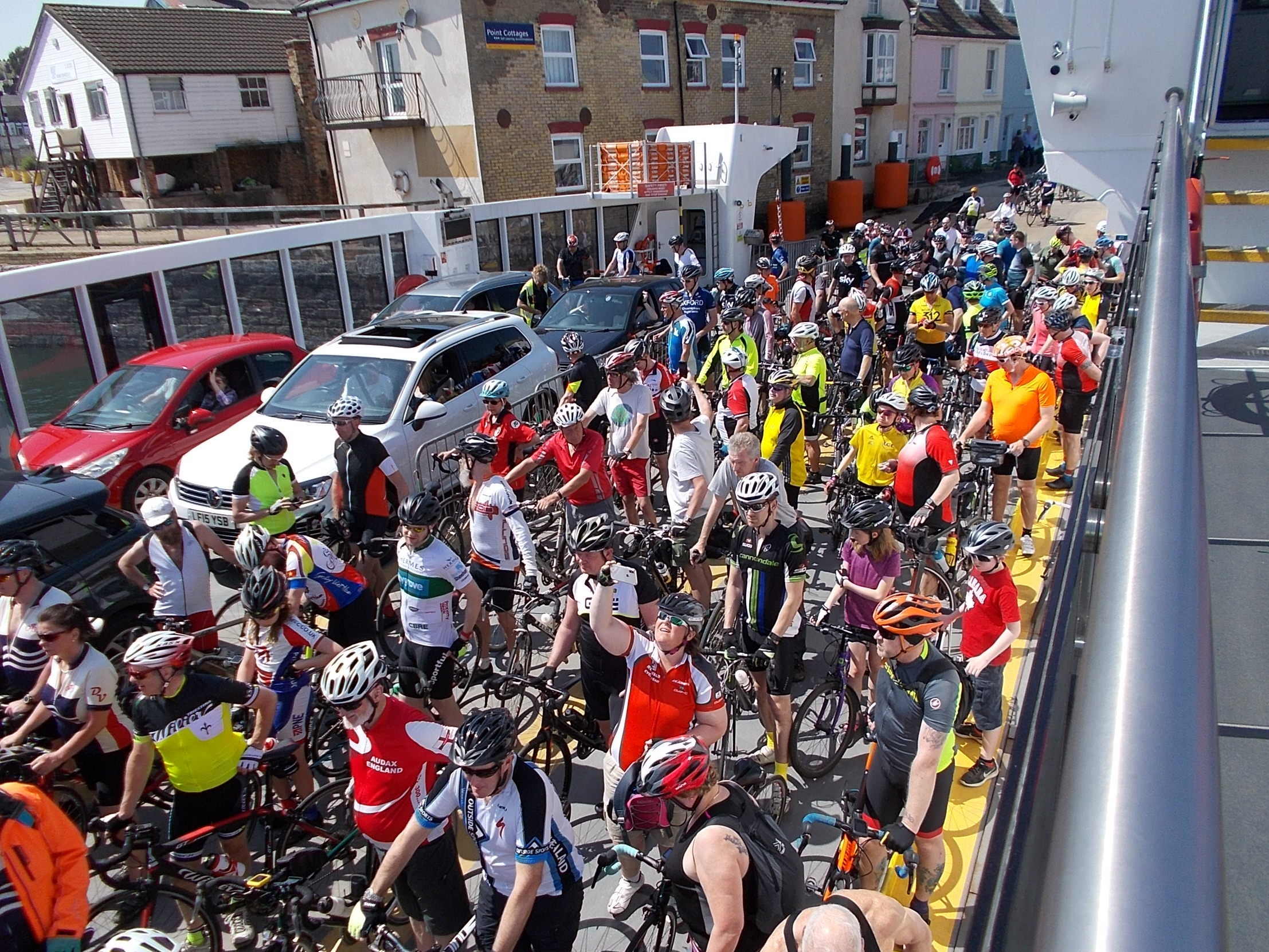
Randonnée participants crossing on the chain ferry from Cowes to East Cowes

The Isle of Wight Randonnée is a yearly cycling event that formerly took place on the Sunday of the early May bank holiday weekend. The event is organised by the local Wayfarers Cycle Touring Club and consists of two rides – a 100 km Round the Island Route, and a 55 km "Mini Randonnée" that covers the East side of the Isle of Wight. The Randonnée is the largest event of its kind on the South Coast of England, attracting around 3,000 cyclists each year.

In 2026 the event is scheduled to take place on 6th September, and will now be sponsored by Mountbatten, Isle of Wight.

== Route ==
The event generally follows the permanently signed "Round the Island Cycle Route". Riders can start/finish at any of the checkpoints on the route. Until 2012 the ride alternated between the clockwise and anticlockwise directions, but now runs clockwise every year.

The full Randonnée checkpoints are East Cowes - Wootton - Bembridge - Alverstone - Whitwell - Yarmouth - use Cowes Floating Bridge - East Cowes.

The Mini Randonnée checkpoints are: East Cowes - Wootton - Bembridge - Alverstone - via Newport and Cowes Floating Bridge - East Cowes.

In 2017, due to the closure of the Cowes Floating Bridge, the route was diverted via Newport.

== Event history ==
The Isle of Wight Randonnée was established by the local Wayfarers cycling club in 1985 and, like the yearly Cycle the Wight event, follows a route around the whole of the Isle of Wight, taking minor roads and lanes where possible enabling the rider to see and enjoy the best of the Island's scenery.
