= Shamblord =

Shamblord was an old name given to two towns on the Isle of Wight, which have since been renamed.

- Cowes
- East Cowes
