= Barton Priory =

Priory on the Isle of Wight, England

Barton Priory (or Burton Oratory) was a priory on the Isle of Wight, England on the site of Barton Manor.

== Early history ==
The Convent, or Oratory of Burton, or Barton, having been dissolved long before the general suppression of monastic foundations, escaped the notice of William Dugdale, John Speed, Thomas Tanner, and other writers on religious houses, so that its existence had nearly sunk into oblivion. Sir John Oglander mentions it in his manuscript Memoirs, but his information appears to have been merely traditional.

Its history is however preserved in the register of John of Pontoise, Bishop of Winchester, wherein the statutes of the house are confirmed by an instrument, in which the bishop affirms he had seen the charters of John de Insula, Rector of Shalfleet, and of Thomas de Winton, Rector of Godshill, founders of the Oratory of the Holy Trinity of Burton, for the ordering and governing the said Oratory made, and in full force, under the seals of the founders, as follows:

I. That there shall be six chaplains and one clerk to officiate both for the living and dead, under the rules of St. Augustin.

II. That one of these shall be presented to the Bishop of Winchester, to be the archpriest; to whom the rest stiall take an oath of obedience.

III. That the archpriest shall be chosen by the chaplains there residing, who shall present him to the bishop within twenty days after any vacancy shall happen.

IV. They shall be fubjea to the immediate authority of the bishop.

V. When any chaplain shall die, his goods shall remain to the Oratory.

VI. They shall have only one mess, with a pittance, at a meal, excepting on the greater festivals, when they may have three messes.

VII. They shall be diligent in reading and praying.

VIII. They shall not go beyond the bounds of the Oratory, without license from the archpriest.

IX. Their habit shall be of one colour, either black or blue; they shall be clothed fallio Hiberniemfi, de nigra bor.ftn cum pileo.

X. The archpriest shall sit at the head of the table, next to him those who have celebrated magiaan miffam; then the priest of St Mary; next the priest of the Holy Trinity; and then the priest who says mass for the dead.

XI. The clerk shall read something edifying to them while they dine.

XII. They shall sleep in one room.

XIII. They shall use a special prayer for their benefactors.

XIV. They shall in all their ceremonies, and in tinkling the bell, follow the use of Sarum.

XV. The archpriest alone shall have charge of the business of the house.

XVI. They shall, all of them, at their admission into the house, swear to the observance of these statutes.

Thomas de Winton, and John de Insula, clerks, grant to John Bishop of Winchester, and his successors, the patronage of their Oratory at Burton, in the parish of Whippingham, that he might become a protector and a defender of them, the archpriest, and his fellow chaplains. The bishop, at the instance of John de Infills, the surviving founder, Thomas, being then dead, or that, after a year and a day from their entering into this Oratory, no one shall accept of any other benefice, or shall depart the house, A/Hum et datum in eliflo Oratorio de Barton, a. 1289, Jordant de Kingston et aliis testittu.

The archpriest being suspended by the bishop, the dean of the island was ordered to take charge of his Oratory in the house at Burton. Soon after, the archpriest being a captive in France, and the house of Burton in a ruinous condition, the bishop gave orders for the house to be repaired, and other necessary things to be done. The Oratory was, in the 18th year of Henry VI (1440–41), surrendered into the hands of the bishop, and, together with its lands, by the procurement the bishop Wainfleet, granted to Winchester College. It was endowed with the manor of Whippingham, the demesne lands of Burton, or Barton, and some lands at Chale. The site and demesnes of the Oratory are still held under a lease from the Warden and Fellows of Winchester College; and part of the old building is yet standing.
