= Musketeer Regiment Prinz Carl =

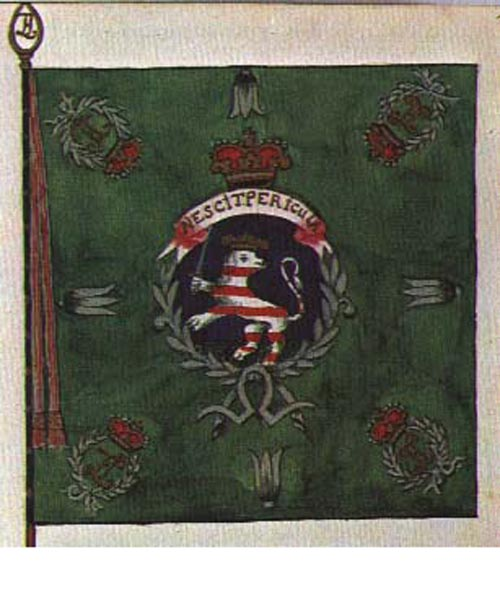
- Colors of Musketeer Regiment Prinz Carl.
- Active: 1702-1832
- Country: Hesse-Kassel; Electorate of Hesse
- Allegiance: Served as Hessian Auxiliaries of the British Army during the American Revolutionary War.
- Type: Infantry
- Garrison/HQ: Bad Hersfeld
- Engagements: Battle of White Plains

The Musketeer Regiment Prinz Carl was a regiment of Hessian troops that served Great Britain during the American Revolutionary War. It was raised in 1702 by Colonel C. F. E. von Wartensleben and became a regiment of the princes of the Landgraviate family. It became 1st Battalion of the 3rd Hessian Infantry Regiment in 1821, and was disbanded in 1832.

== American Revolutionary War ==
According to German military records, the regiment was raised in Bad Hersfeld, Hesse-Kassel (or Hesse-Cassel), Germany. On January 21, 1776, the regiment marched from Hersfeld, embarking in Carlstadt at Bremerlehe on March, 23. They sailed for America on April 17, 1776, and landed at Staten Island, New York on August 15. They fought in the Battle of White Plains on October 28, 1776, and participated in the capture of Newport, Rhode Island July 29 to August 31, 1778, as well as other minor actions. On November 12, 1783, the regiment sailed from New York for Bremerlehe, returning to the garrison at Hersfeld on May 28, 1784. Some of the men were sent to Whippingham on the Isle of Wight to convalesce: many died there and are buried at the parish church.

Although the official history of the unit does not give precise details of its movements, there are indications of other operations:

According to a Sep. 23, 1777 letter from Lieutenant General Sir Henry Clinton, to Gen. Sir William Howe, the regiment participated in an incursion into New Jersey from the 12th to the 16th of September, 1777.

Also, a report of a Hessian deserter from 28 August 1782, found in George Washington's papers, indicates this regiment, along with "the Regt. of Wesebach & Angenella together with Fanning's Corps., & 7th British Reg., came lately from Savannah & are now on Long Island, very weak in number and very sickly." In this report, "7th British Regt. is likely the "7th Regiment of Foot (Royal Fuzileers)" under Lt. Gen. Richard Prescott, who had been ordered to Savannah on 22 December 1781. "Fanning's Corps." is probably the loyalist "King's American Regiment" "Angenella" is probably the "Grenadier Regt. von d'Angelelli." And, the "Regt. of Wesebach" likely refers to the Hessian "Regt. von Wissenbach", although von Knoblauch had taken command by that time. The British forces evacuated Savannah on July 11, 1782.

== Officers ==
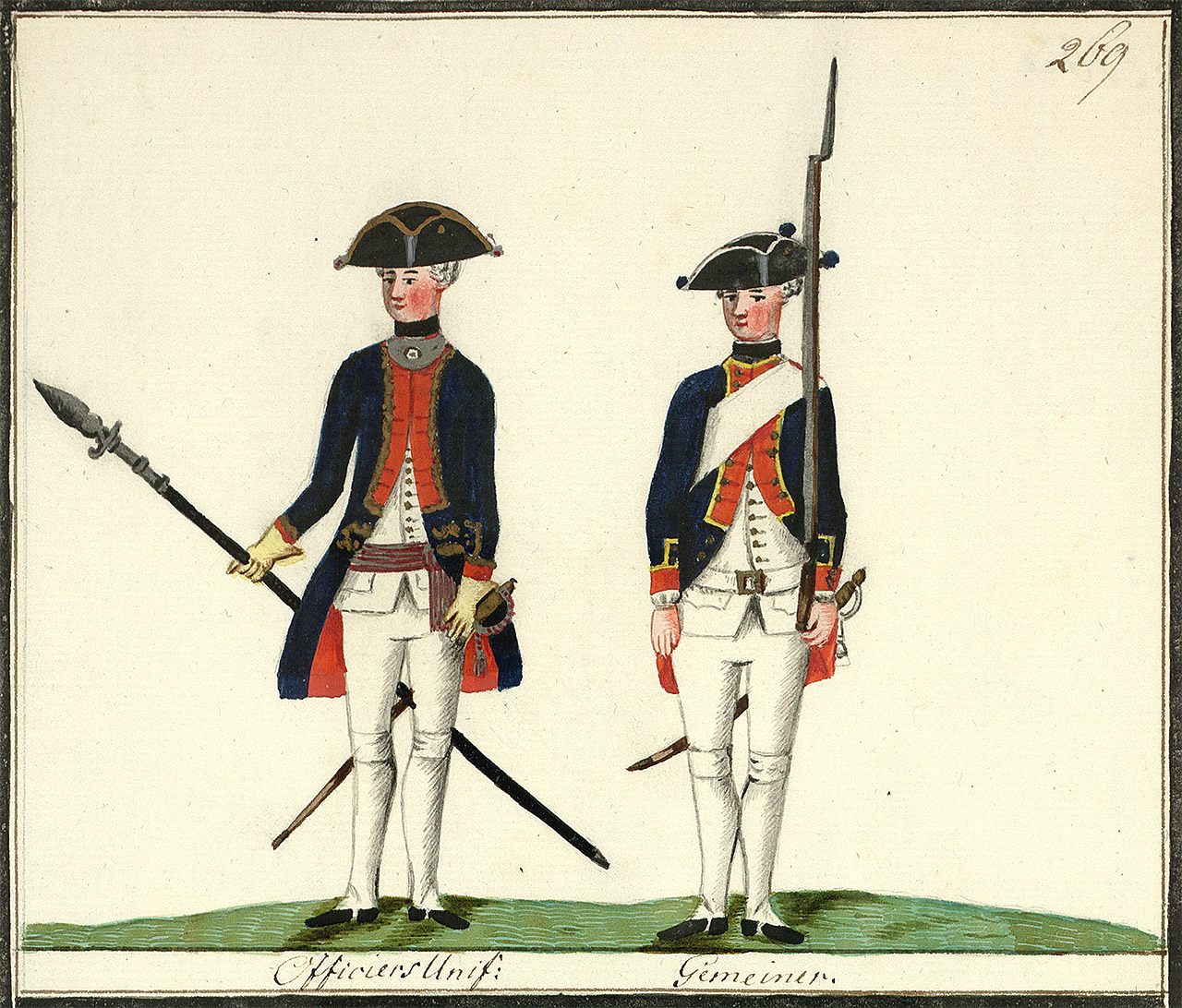
Uniform of Regiment Prinz Carl.

Leibkompanie

Kompanie 2

- (1775–80) Generalmajor Martin Konrad Schmitt
- (1780–84) Generalmajor Ephraim v. Gose

Kompanie 3

- (1775) Obrist (Colonel) Ephraim v. Gose
- (1776–84) Obrist George Emanuel v. Lengerke

Kompanie 4

- (1775–84) Obristleutnant Johann Wilhelm Schreiber (promoted to Obrist)

Kompanie 5

- (1775–84) Major Wilhelm v. Loewenstein (promoted to Obristleutnant, then Obrist)
