= Barton Manor =

Coordinates: 50.7474°N 1.2643°W

- The manor house and the Barton Pond
- Former names: Burton
- Alternative names: Burtone

General information
- Type: Manor house
- Architectural style: Jacobean
- Location: Whippingham, United Kingdom

The history of Barton Manor (originally from the Old English, burc-tun; alternates: Burton, Burtone, Berton, Barton) spans over 900 years and was first mentioned in the Domesday Book of 1086. It is a Jacobean manor house in Whippingham, on the Isle of Wight. While it retains two 17th-century elevations, other frontages were renovated, as was the interior in the 19th century. Two medieval lancet windows originated at a former Augustinian priory. Barton is the most northerly of all the Island manor houses.

== Early history ==
The manor of Barton is mentioned in Domesday Book as having been held of King Edward by Bolla, and as having passed at the Conquest into the hands of the Norman, Fitz Stur, with whose family it remained until the reign of Henry III., when it passed by marriage to Walter de Insula. About 1282, John de Insula, rector of Shaltteet, and Peter de Winter, rector of Godshill, founded and endowed at Barton an oratory of Augustines for six priests and a clerk. This Barton Priory was dedicated to the Holy Trinity, and placed under the patronage of the Bishop of Winchester; but about the middle of the 15th century it was suppressed, and its lands granted by Bishop Waynflete to Winchester College, with which they remained 'til purchased by Her Majesty, in 1846. The ancient Barton Manor House, which was erected shortly after the suppression of the religious foundation, has been considerably enlarged and renovated, so that it is now a large mansion of that style of domestic architecture which prevailed during the reign of the Tudors.

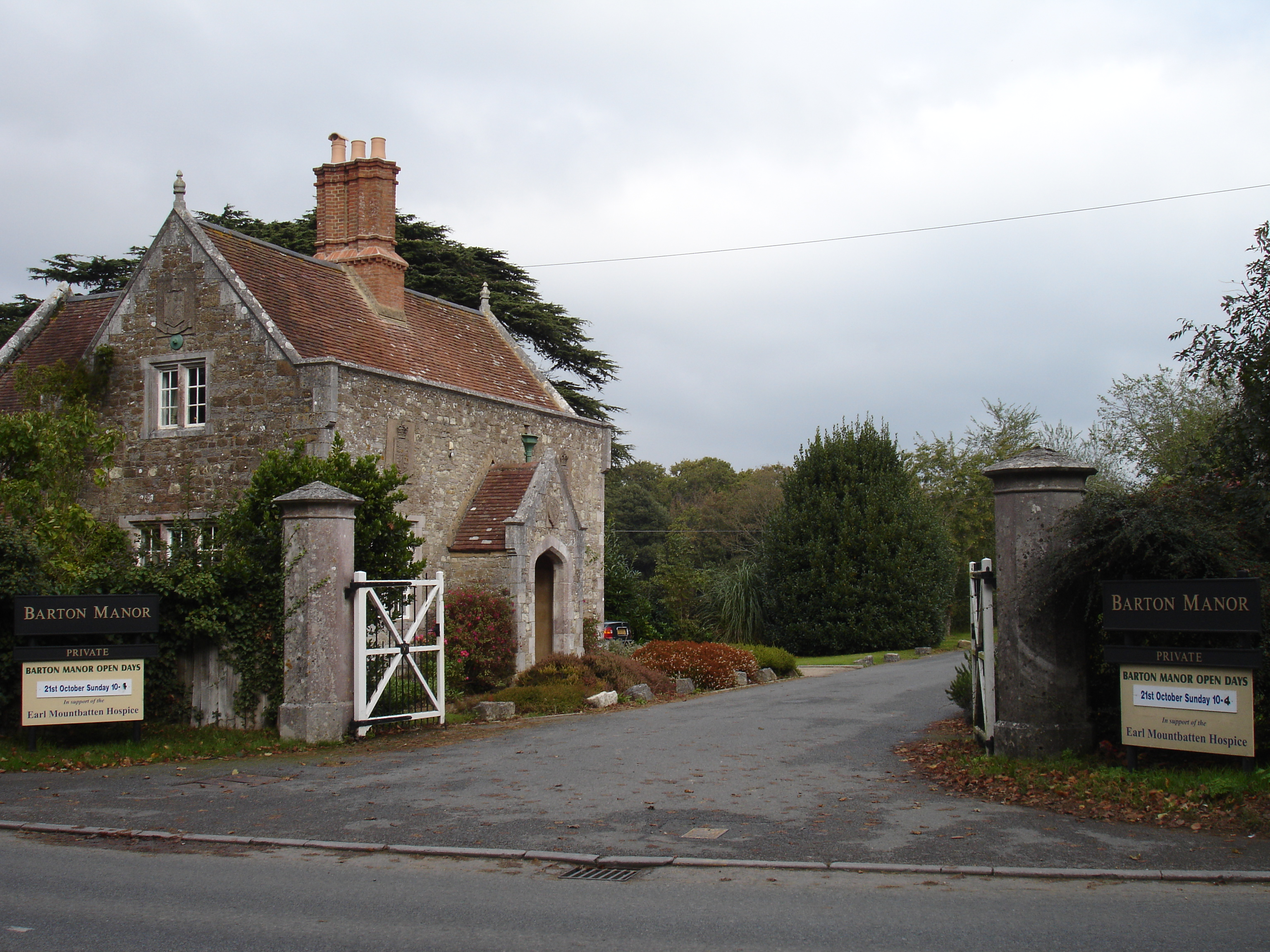
Gateway and North Lodge

== Timeline ==
=== Winchester College (1439-1845) ===
Barton Manor was owned by Winchester College for some 400 years until being sold to Queen Victoria in 1845. Winchester College, which was established in 1382, is a private boarding school for boys in the British public school tradition, situated in Winchester, Hampshire.

At the time, all of the Barton lands were given to the college by the Arch-priest of Barton, Walter Trengof. Using the estate to boost its income, Winchester College leased out the lands to a variety of tenants for farming purposes.

=== Queen Victoria (1845-1901) ===
Queen Victoria first rented Barton Manor for a period of a year from 1844, to assess its suitability as her family home. However, obviously deciding that it was too small, she purchased the nearby Osborne House instead, which became her main Isle of Wight residence. She had long been associated with East Cowes, since staying at Norris Castle, as a girl. She also tried to buy Norris Castle in 1845, but failed.

However, the Queen still bought Barton Manor in 1845 for £18,000. Her main reason for purchasing the estate was so that she could house Crown equerries and visiting European royalty there.

Barton Manor remained in her possession until her death in 1901.

=== King Edward VII (1901-1910) ===
Inheriting the estate from Queen Victoria, Edward VII decided to retain Barton Manor for his own use, after gifting Osborne House to the nation in 1902. Barton Manor was a favourite summer retreat of his. He retained the estate until his death in 1910.

He visited Barton Manor on 6 August 1903, along with George, Prince of Wales, General Sir Stanley Clarke and Major Sir Schomberg McDonnell. At the time, Barton Manor was said to be undergoing alterations and being refurnished. It was rumoured that this was because it was intended to be used by members of the Royal Family.

On 15 March 1904, Barton Manor was again visited by George, Prince of Wales, together with Mary, Princess of Wales. The 'commodious' Barton Manor was described as having been enlarged, but was still at that time being prepared for Royal visitors.

In August 1906, Canon Hervey, the King's Chaplain at Sandringham, left Barton Manor after spending a few months there for the benefit of his health. He had much improved and had been staying there at the request of King Edward VII, who still retained the estate.

Sir Francis Henry Laking, 1st Baronet, GCVO, KCB and his wife arrived at Barton Manor in October 1906, for a stay which lasted for two months, gaining much benefit in health.

=== King George V (1910-1922) ===
King George inherited the estate from his father, King Edward VII. He held on to the estate until 1922, when he decided to sell it, ending 75 years of Royal ownership.

=== The Tillett Family (1922-1954) ===
Mr & Mrs F C Tillett bought the Barton Manor estate and farmed it for some 30 years, together with their son, Ivor. At the time, the estate was said to be around 725 acres.

However, it was also reported that around 1938/1939, Sir Peter Drummond Macdonald KBE and his wife Lady Jean Macdonald (daughter of Douglas Cochrane, 12th Earl of Dundonald), lived on the Barton Manor estate. Sir Peter was a Canadian-born Conservative Party politician. He was member of parliament (MP) for the Isle of Wight for 35 years from 1924 to 1959.

In 1952, by which time Ivor Tillett owned the estate in his own right, he and his wife relocated to Devon. Barton Manor was put up for sale as a vacant possession.

=== Brookfield School (1954-1962) ===
In September 1953, it was said that the Crown was interested in re-acquiring Barton Manor, which was due to be sold by auction. At the auction, the estate was to be broken up and sold as a large number of smaller lots.

It was reported that in February 1954, Barton Manor was sold to Gerald Joynson. While at the time, Joynson lived on the mainland, he was formerly of the Isle of Wight and had been master of the Isle of Wight Hunt, until he stepped down in 1933. It was said that he was also well known for sailing in the River Hamble.

Shortly after, Brookfield School relocated from Fairlee Road, Newport to Barton Manor. The boarding school was run by its Headmaster, Tony Williams who founded the school in 1953 and had around 30 boarders between the ages of 9 and 16. Williams, who used to be in the Royal Navy, thought that with his Naval and scholastic experience, he could create an 'unconventional' school that could be of real benefit to the country's educational system.

However, amid some scandal, the school closed its doors in 1955. Despite this, there is some evidence that the manor stayed in the Williams family, as in May 1960 it was given as the address for Captain T G Williams, who may have been Tony William's younger brother. Captain Williams and his crew had to be rescued from his ship, 'J T & S', a 129-ton Irish Schooner which was set ablaze, following an engine-room blow-out.

=== Mr J V Figgins (1962-1964) ===
In January 1962, it was reported that Barton Manor had been sold to a Mr J V Figgins of Portsmouth and Waterlooville. At the time, Figgins also owned Fort Warden Holiday Camp in Colwell Bay on the Isle of Wight, but his main business was in construction and plant hire. It was said that the building was in need of modernisation and after doing this, it would become his private residence.

=== Miss Joyce Annie Holt (1964-1967) ===
It was reported that Joyce was a lady of means and that in her younger days, she moved in 'that circle of people'. In later life, she amassed a valuable collection of books, together with antiques. She also had a bookshop in Newport, on the Isle of Wight.

Joyce Holt acquired Barton Manor sometime around 1964, after moving from Newport on the Isle of Wight.

=== Lady Eva Mary Price (1967-1976) ===
Lady Price, known as Eve, was the widow of Sir Henry Price, 1st Baronet, who was a British businessman and philanthropist. Born in 1908, she was thirty years younger than her husband. Their family home was originally Wakehurst Place, an Elizabethan mansion built in 1590 and set in 500 acres. When Sir Henry died in 1963, he left Wakehurst Place to the nation, although Lady Price had the right to stay there for the rest of her life. However, some years later she decided to move to the Isle of Wight and bought Barton Manor.

Both keen botanists, both Sir Henry and Lady Price had roses named after them. They were the Pieris formosa 'Henry Price' and the Viburnum tinus 'Eve Price'.

Lady Price died in April 1993. Her and Sir Henry Price's private antique collection was sold for £4.1 million in November 2000 by auction at Sotheby's.

=== Anthony Goddard (1976-1991) ===
Anthony Goddard purchased Barton Manor in March 1976. During his ownership, he turned the estate into a popular visitor's attraction and added a high-quality vineyard, producing some 30,000 bottles of wine each year. Goddard sold the manor in October 1991.

=== Robert Stigwood (1991-2006) ===
Barton Manor was later bought by Australian film and music tycoon Robert Stigwood, who bought the estate in October 1991. At the time, it was valued at just over £1.15 million. Stigwood said that he wanted the estate to be his UK residence.

At the time of purchase, he promised to keep the gardens and vineyards open to the public.

Robert Stigwood sold the estate in 2006.

=== Panaghis & Sally Ann Lykiardopulo (2006-2012) ===
Barton Manor was put on the market in 2004 for around £9 million. In 2006, the new owners stated that they wished to remain anonymous, but invited fundraisers to continue holding events in the grounds. It later transpired that the owner was Panaghis Lykiardopulo and his wife, Sally Ann.

=== Alex Haig-Thomas (2012- ) ===
It was reported (incorrectly) that Alex Haig-Thomas bought Barton Manor in 2012 for £9 million, the same price that it was advertised for in 2004. Haig-Thomas was described as an online gaming entrepreneur. Furniture from the manor was sold at auction just prior to the sale.
