= East Cowes Town Hall =

Municipal building in East Cowes, Isle of Wight, England

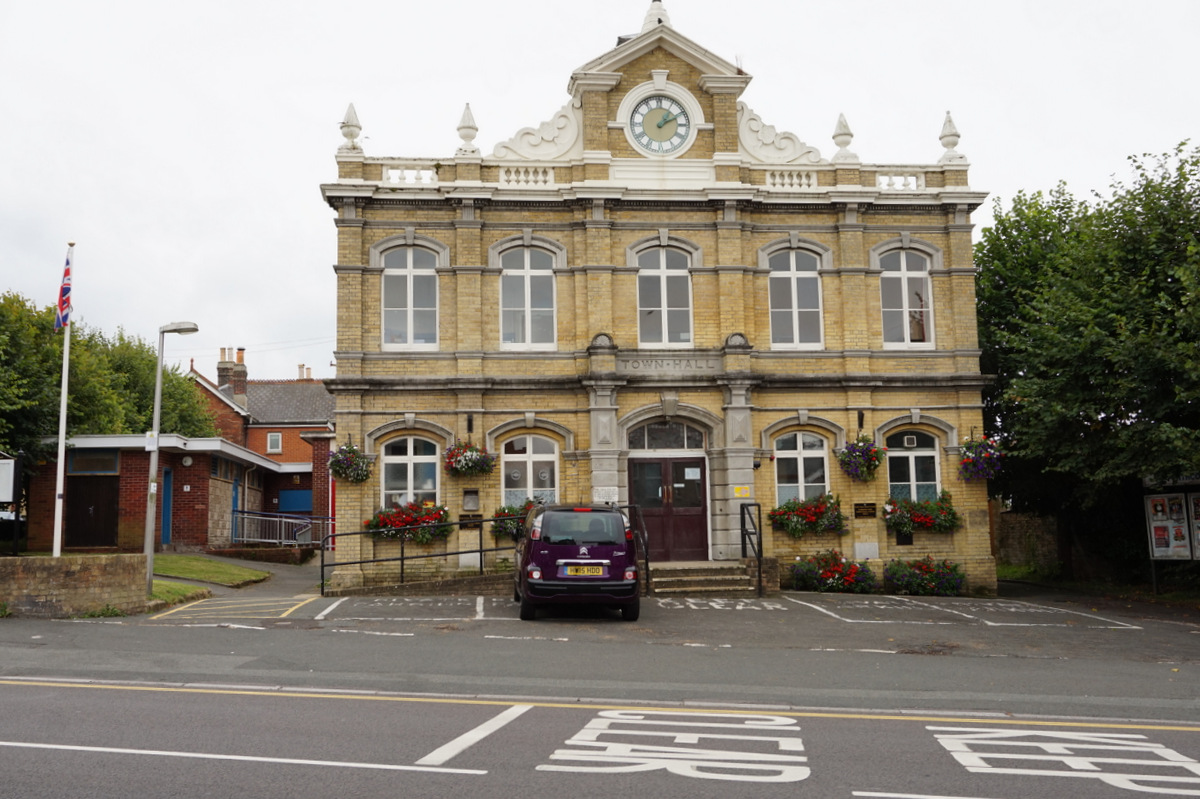
- East Cowes Town Hall

- Shown on the Isle of Wight
- 50.7572°N 1.2877°W
- Location: York Avenue, East Cowes

History
- Built: 1897

Site notes
- Architect: James Newman
- Architectural style: Italianate style

East Cowes Town Hall is a municipal building in York Avenue, East Cowes, Isle of Wight, England. The structure, which is the meeting place of East Cowes Town Council, is a locally listed building.

== History ==
Following significant population growth, largely associated with the shipbuilding industry, East Cowes became an urban district in 1894. Amy Florence White, the wife the local shipbuilder, John Samuel White, immediately organised a campaign to raise funds by public subscription for a town hall to accommodate the new council.

The foundation stone for the new building was laid by Mrs White on 28 May 1896. It was designed by James Newman in the Italianate style, built in yellow brick with stone dressings and was officially presented to the council by Mrs White on 25 March 1897. The design involved a symmetrical main frontage with five bays facing onto York Avenue; the central bay, which slightly projected forward, featured a doorway with a fanlight flanked by stuccoed pilasters which were surmounted by acroteria; the pilasters supported an entablature inscribed with the words "Town Hall". The other bays on the ground floor and the bays on the first floor were fenestrated with round headed windows with architraves. At roof level, there was a parapet interspersed with sections of balustrade and broken by a central section, containing a clock, which was flanked by floral motifs and was surmounted by an open pediment. The parapet was also decorated with four finials. Internally, the principal room was the main assembly hall.

On 2 January 1901, Field Marshal Lord Roberts, who had commanded the British troops during the Second Boer War, received welcome addresses from civic officials at the town hall and, in his response, took the opportunity to express confidence in his successor in South Africa, General Lord Kitchener. The building continued to serve as the headquarters of East Cowes Urban District Council until 1933 when the area was absorbed by Cowes Urban District Council which had its own offices at Northwood House.

The town hall continued to be used as a local venue for concerts and theatrical events and, following the formation of East Cowes Town Council in the late 1990s, the town hall also became the meeting place of the town council.
