= Cowes Floating Bridge =

Car ferry on the Isle of Wight, England

Coordinates: 50°45′27.7″N 1°17′29.3″W

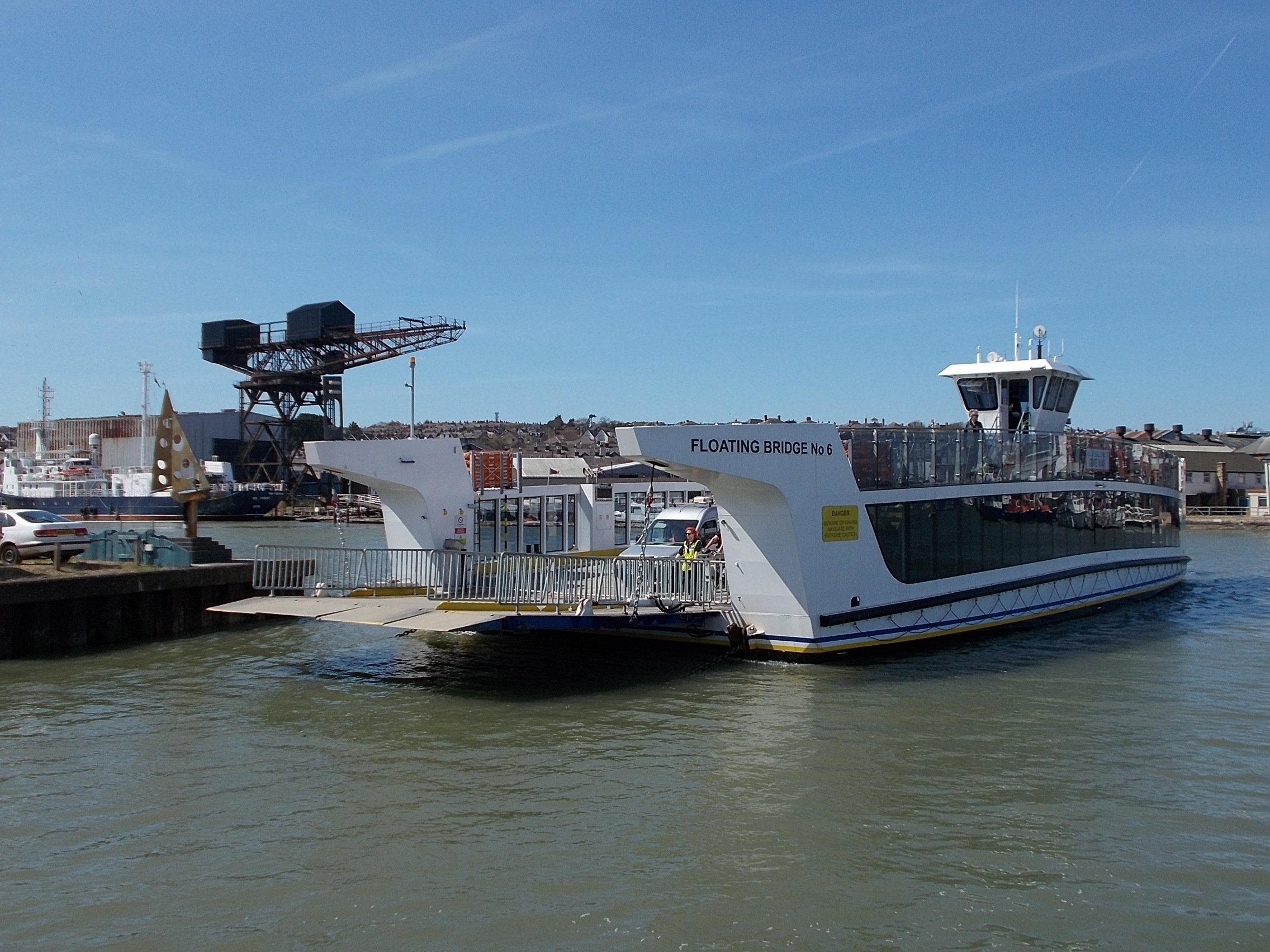
- Cowes Floating Bridge (or Chain Ferry). Floating Bridge No 6, pictured, was first brought into service in May 2017.
- Waterway: River Medina
- Transit type: Chain ferry
- Carries: Up to 20 cars
- Operator: Isle of Wight Council
- Began operation: 1859
- Predecessor: Floating Bridge Company; The Southampton, Isle of Wight and South of England Royal Mail Steam Packet Co. Limited (Red Funnel)
- System length: 125m
- Travel time: 2 to 3 minutes
- Frequency: Continuous while open
- No. of vessels: 1 (No. 6)

The Cowes Floating Bridge is a vehicular chain ferry that crosses the River Medina on the Isle of Wight, off the south coast of England. The ferry crosses the tidal river from East Cowes to Cowes, and remains the only way to cross the River Medina between the towns without taking a ten-mile trip via Newport.

The ferry currently used is named No. 6, the sixth to be owned by the Isle of Wight Council, and ninth in total. It was built in 2017, and can carry up to 20 cars.

It was installed on 14 May 2017, but the service was suspended by the Maritime and Coastguard Agency after a string of technical issues, and a passenger-only replacement service was provided by a small launch. After several months of service suspension and intermittent operation, full service finally resumed early in 2018. Since then, it has continued to be plagued with issues, and has become known for its breakdowns and problems.

== History ==
The first floating bridge between the two towns was established in 1859 and the crossing is one of the few remaining that has not been replaced by a physical bridge. The service is owned and operated by the Isle of Wight Council, which has run it since 1901. Prior to ownership by the local authority the service was run by The Floating Bridge Company and The Steam Packet Company (Red Funnel).

Before any kind of floating bridge existed, a rowing boat ferry operated between Cowes and East Cowes transporting pedestrians only. This service was owned and operated by the Roberton family from 1720 to 1859. From 1842 carriages and animals could be transported across using a pontoon which was winched across under horse power. In 1859 the Floating Bridge Company was formed and bought the ferry rights. From 24 November 1859 the first steamboat was used, built on the River Itchen in Southampton. In 1868 the ferry was bought by The Steam Packet Company and bought a new ferry for the service in 1882. This was used regularly until 1896 when it was used only as a spare when a new ferry was purchased.

=== Past vessels ===
A total of nine different vessels have been used on the route since operations started in 1859.

Ferries of the Cowes - East Cowes floating bridge route
Number	Name	Builder	Operator	In service	Photo	Notes
No 1	None	Mr Hodgkinson	Floating Bridge Company	1859-1882		Built on the River Itchen. Started service in 1859 as the first floating bridge operated after the Floating Bridge Company bought the rights to the route.
No 2	None	Napier & Son of Southampton	Steam Packet Company	1882-1909		Used as a spare from 1896 when a new bridge was built, until it was finally scrapped in 1909.
No 3	None	W. White & Sons - Vectis Yard, Cowes	Steam Packet Company	1896-1925		Sold to local yacht builder Uffa Fox in 1925 after being used as a spare and deteriorating during the First World War. From then it was used as a workshop and accommodation.
No 4	Bridge No.1	W. White & Sons - Vectis Yard, Cowes	West & East Cowes Urban Councils	1909-1936		The first bridge operated under local authority control. The name Bridge No.1 ignores the previous bridges run by other operators.
No 5	Bridge No.2	J. Samuel White & Co, East Cowes	West & East Cowes Urban Councils	1925-1952		Used on the Sandbanks Ferry route during the Second World War. It was later sold to Sandbanks for use as a spare when Bridge No.4 arrived in 1952.
No 6	Bridge No.3	J. Samuel White & Co, East Cowes	West & East Cowes Urban Councils	1936		The first floating bridge to be diesel-electric powered.
No 7	Bridge No.4	J.Bolson of Poole	West & East Cowes Urban Councils/Medina Borough Council	1952-1982		Withdrawn in 1982 after the delivery of Bridge No.5 in 1975. This withdrawal meant the service was down to one ferry without spare for the first time in decades.
No 8	Bridge No.5		Medina Borough Council/Isle of Wight Council	1975-2017		Used as the sole vessel operating the route from 1982 onwards.
No 9	Bridge No.6	Mainstay Marine	Isle of Wight Council	2017–present		Current vessel.

=== Local authority ownership ===
Cowes Ferry Act 1901
- Act of Parliament
- Parliament of the United Kingdom
- Long title: An Act to empower the Urban District Councils of Cowes and East Cowes to take on lease the existing Royal Ferry across the River Medina between their respective districts and to work and manage the same and for other purposes.
- Citation: 1 Edw. 7. c. lxxxviii

Dates
- Royal assent: 26 July 1901

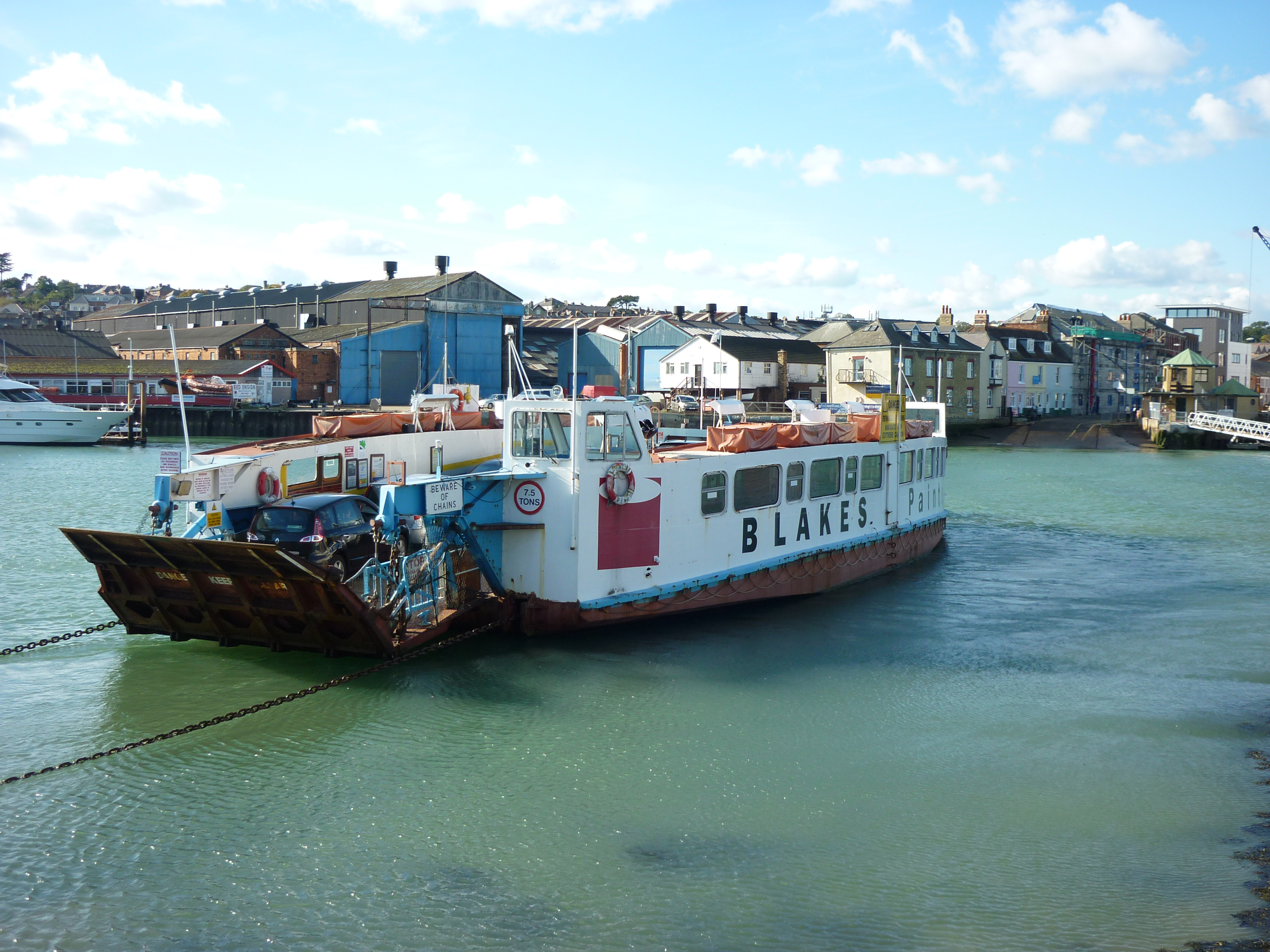
Floating Bridge No 5, taken out of service in 2017.

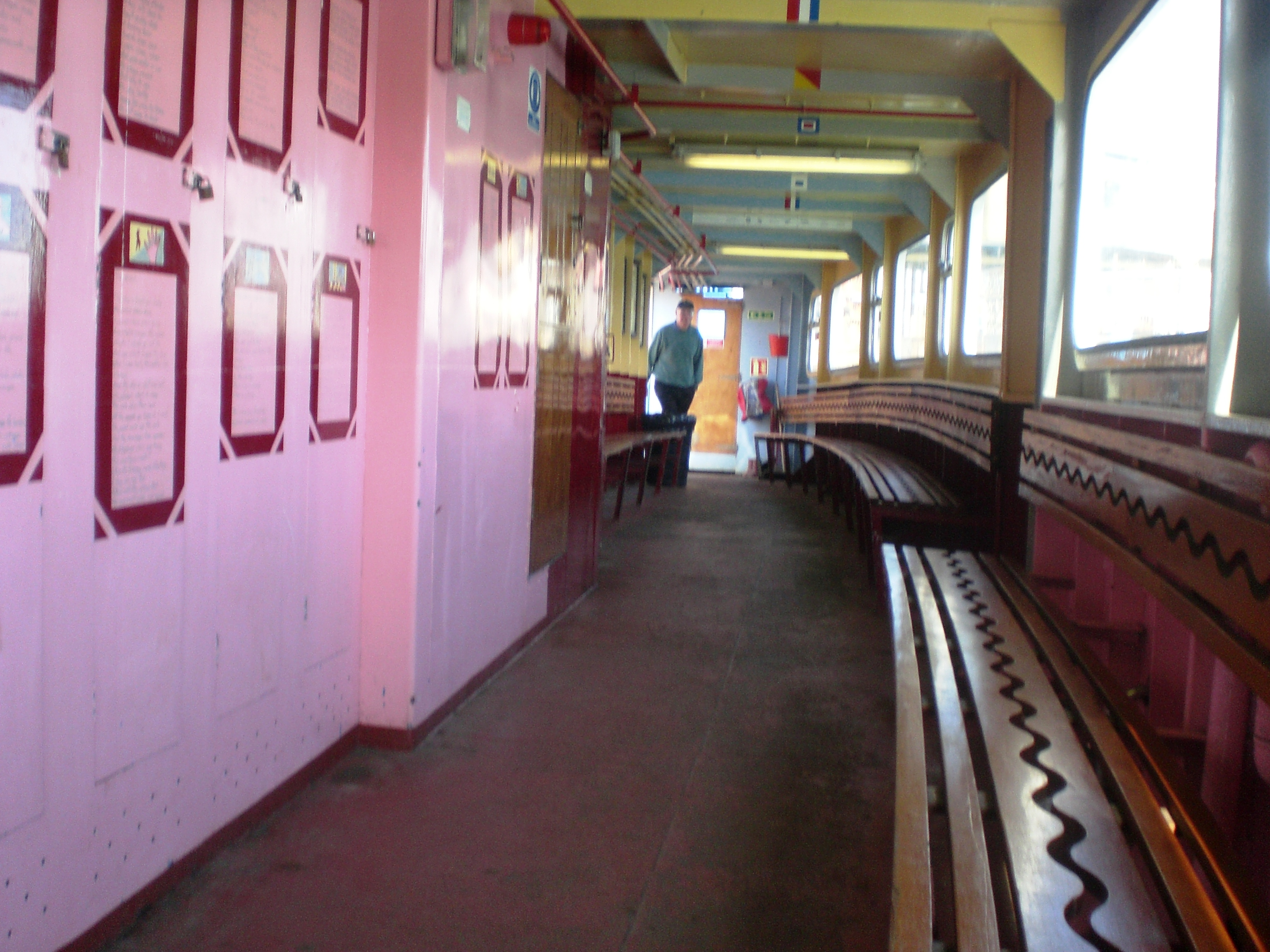
The interior of Floating Bridge No 5

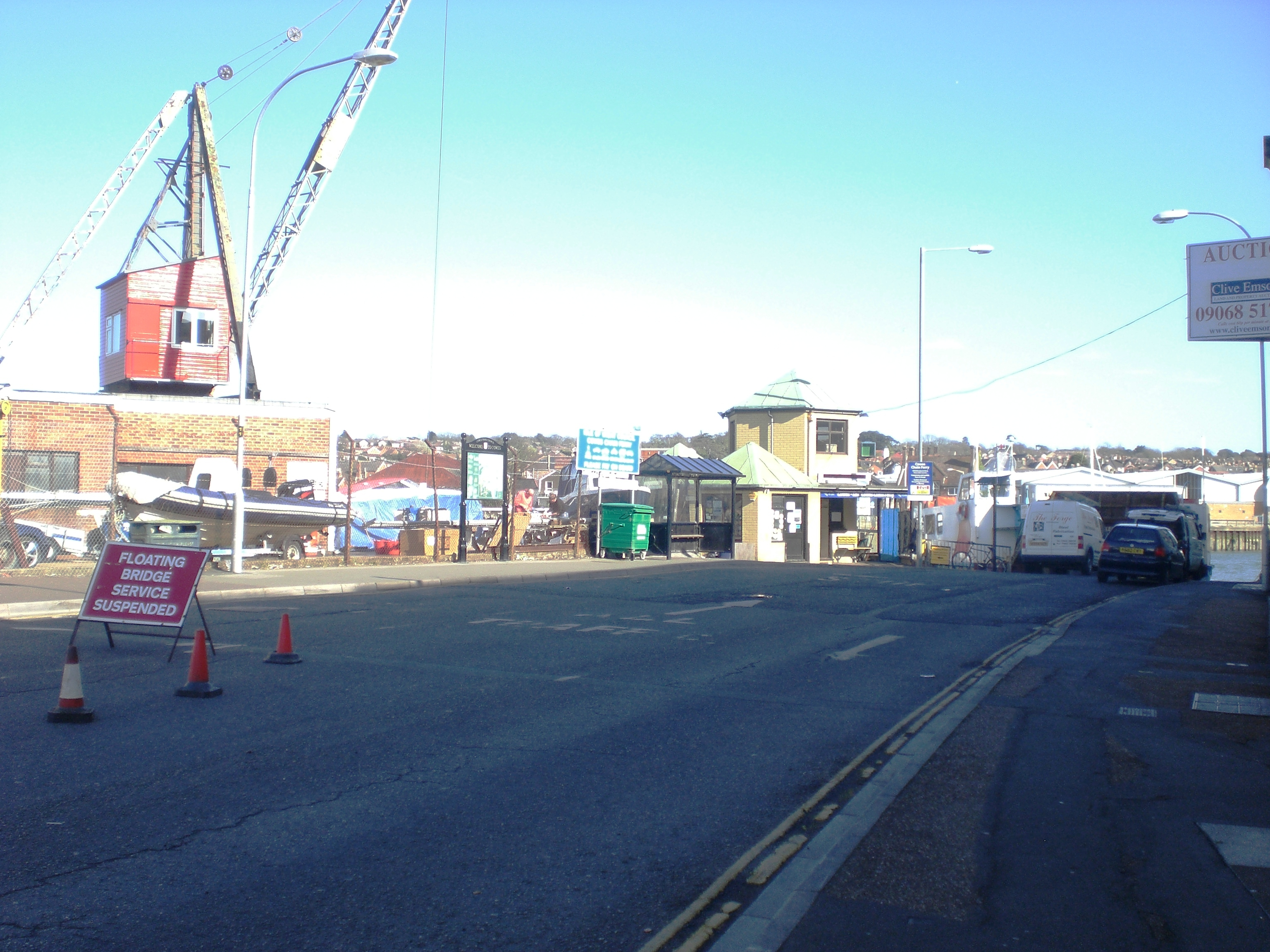
The floating bridge suspended during an annual refit

The route was first taken over by the local authority in 1909, when the Cowes and East Cowes urban district councils took over their operation using powers under the Cowes Ferry Act 1901 (1 Edw. 7. c. lxxxviii). With this, a new ferry was bought and started the system of naming vessels still used today, by numbering them in order of acquisition, the first being named Bridge No.1. These newer bridges were significantly different from past designs, with Bridge No.1 featuring power ramps and electric lighting and was built from steel. In 1925 Bridge No.2 was built, being the last steam powered ship. It was larger than any that had previously operated the route at over 100 ft long (30 m), with a capacity for eight cars. This was later sold on for use at Sandbanks when Bridge No.3 was built and arrived in 1936, being the first diesel-electric powered vessel. Bridge No.4 entered service in 1952 with a capacity for 12 cars. This was used regularly until 1975 when the current Bridge No.5 arrived with a capacity of up to 20 cars. From 1982 there were no reserve vessels in place for the route, leaving Bridge No.5 as the sole ferry operated. In 1988 a direct bus service was created between Ryde and Cowes which involved the bus travelling over on the floating bridge. Small buses had to be used to guarantee space on the crossing, however the service was withdrawn by 1990.

In 2006 the Isle of Wight Council considered converting the floating bridge to only transport vehicles across the River Medina, setting up a launch for pedestrians with a charge of 50p. Prior to this the last time a foot passenger charge was in operation was until 1992, when the vehicle tolls were raised from 75p to £1.25 to compensate for any lost income. While this initially resulted in a slump in crossings from 300,000 to less than 210,000 in 1993, as the diversion travelling via Newport became more congested the popularity of the floating bridge began to rise again. The argument was put forward that by taking out passenger compartments the overall capacity of the ferry could be increased by up to 30%. Following this it was hoped that the service could become profitable, as it has historically always made a loss. However, the idea of introducing a charge was very unpopular with local residents, councillors and businesses and the threat receded.

Earlier vessels included stairs to give passengers access to roofs covering the vehicle deck, a feature not present on Bridge No. 5. After 40 years of operation Bridge No. 5 made its last journey on 3 January 2017,and is currently laid up awaiting sale in Gosport.

Occasionally the idea of replacing the chain ferry with a swing bridge or tunnel is brought up; however, this has yet to materialise into a serious debate.

== Current operations ==
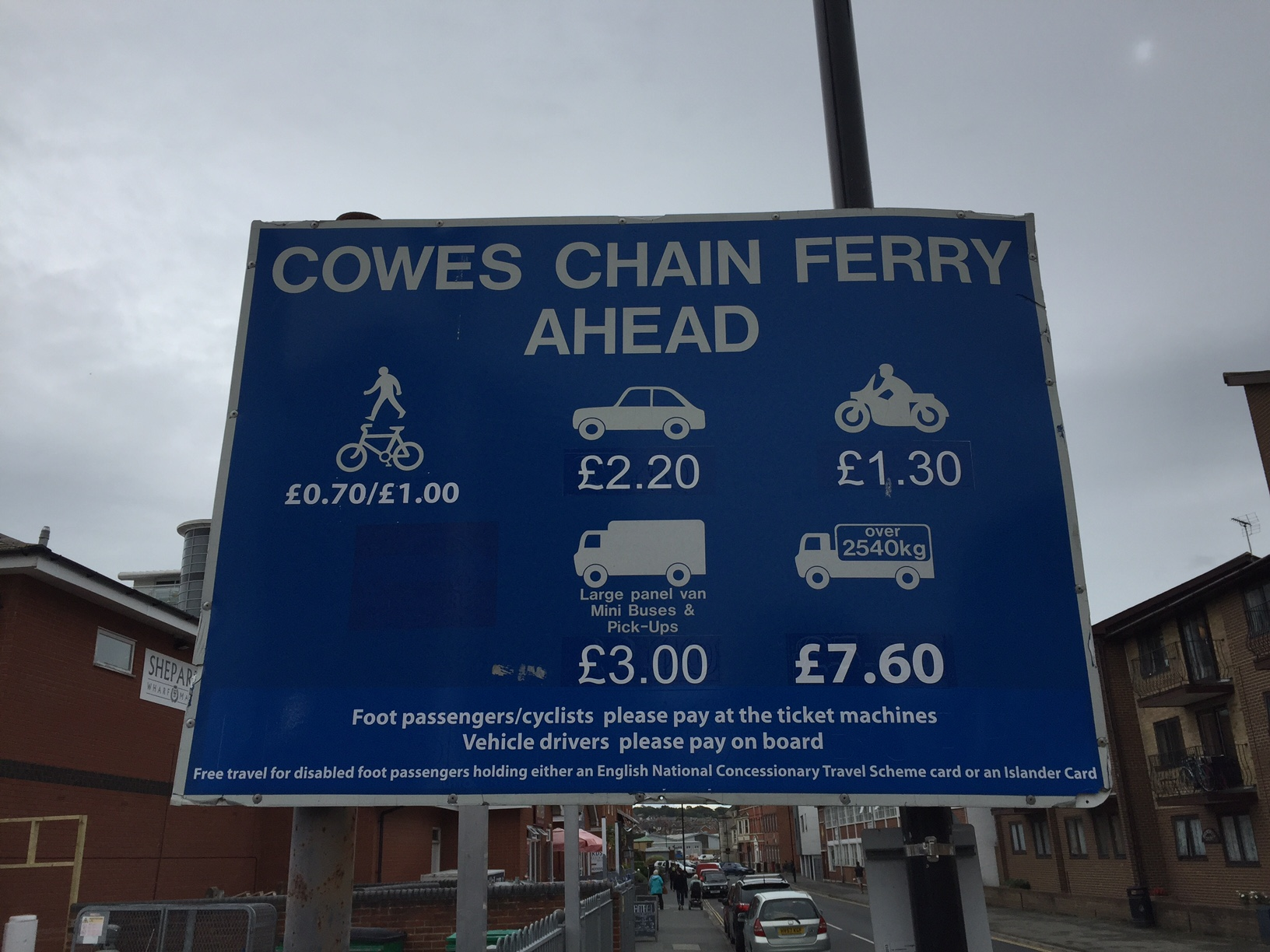
A sign depicting the various tariffs for the chain ferry in 2016

The ferry operates daily, normally for around 18 hours a day between 05:00 to 00:30, although starts slightly later on Sundays. There are regular crossings at around every 10 – 15 minutes, with no formal timetable other than first and last crossings. Public transport connections are available on both sides by Southern Vectis bus route 1 in Cowes and routes 4 and 5 in East Cowes linking to Newport and Ryde. Annually, the floating bridge transports around 1.5 million pedestrians and 400,000 vehicles. At certain times of the year the ferry is unable to operate as it goes through an annual refit. During this time a foot passenger ferry is operated, however the only alternative for vehicles is to travel along the River Medina and cross at Newport.

The tidal nature of the River Medina can periodically restrict operations of the floating bridge during times of very low tides. Normal tides can give a variation in the river width from 70 metres to 140 metres, but in September 2007 exceptionally low tides caused by a full moon resulted in the river being too shallow for the bridge to operate. Similarly in 2003 the ferry was left stranded on the banks of the East Cowes side of the river as the tide decreased due to difficulties with a vehicle disembarking the vessel, leaving it grounded. It was then unable to move until the next high tide later that day.

Due to the Isle of Wight Council budget cuts in 2010, the Isle of Wight Council began considering charging 50p each way for pedestrians, cyclists, car passengers, and pillions on the floating bridge. In January 2011, the East Cowes Town Council passed a resolution about the floating bridge and residents have been calling for a public consultation on the floating bridge arguing that charging to cross the river could affect the local economies of the two interdependent towns. The River Medina traditionally has not been bridged with a fixed-link bridge in order to allow yachts and barges carrying goods to pass up river to the rest of the island. The last charge for pedestrians ended in 1992 and was 10p. As of September 2016, pedestrian and bicycle charges were 70p for a return using a Saver Card, or £1 for a return using the ticket machines, although under 18s are still free.

=== Financial performance ===
In October 2019 the publication of a freedom of information request showed the financial performance of the floating bridge from the financial year of 2015–16 to the first 5 months of 2019–20. The cost of additional launch services and perceived unreliability of the new vessel from 2017 was blamed for the loss in revenue.

	2015/16	2016/17	2017/18	2018/19	2019/20 (first 5 months)
Income	£709,148	£730,505	£419,888	£738,514	£372,061
Costs	£588,696	£766,893	£967,879	£1,039,807	£436,173
Net profit/loss	£120,452 profit	£36,388 loss	£547,991 loss	£301,293 loss	£64,112 loss

== Current vessel ==
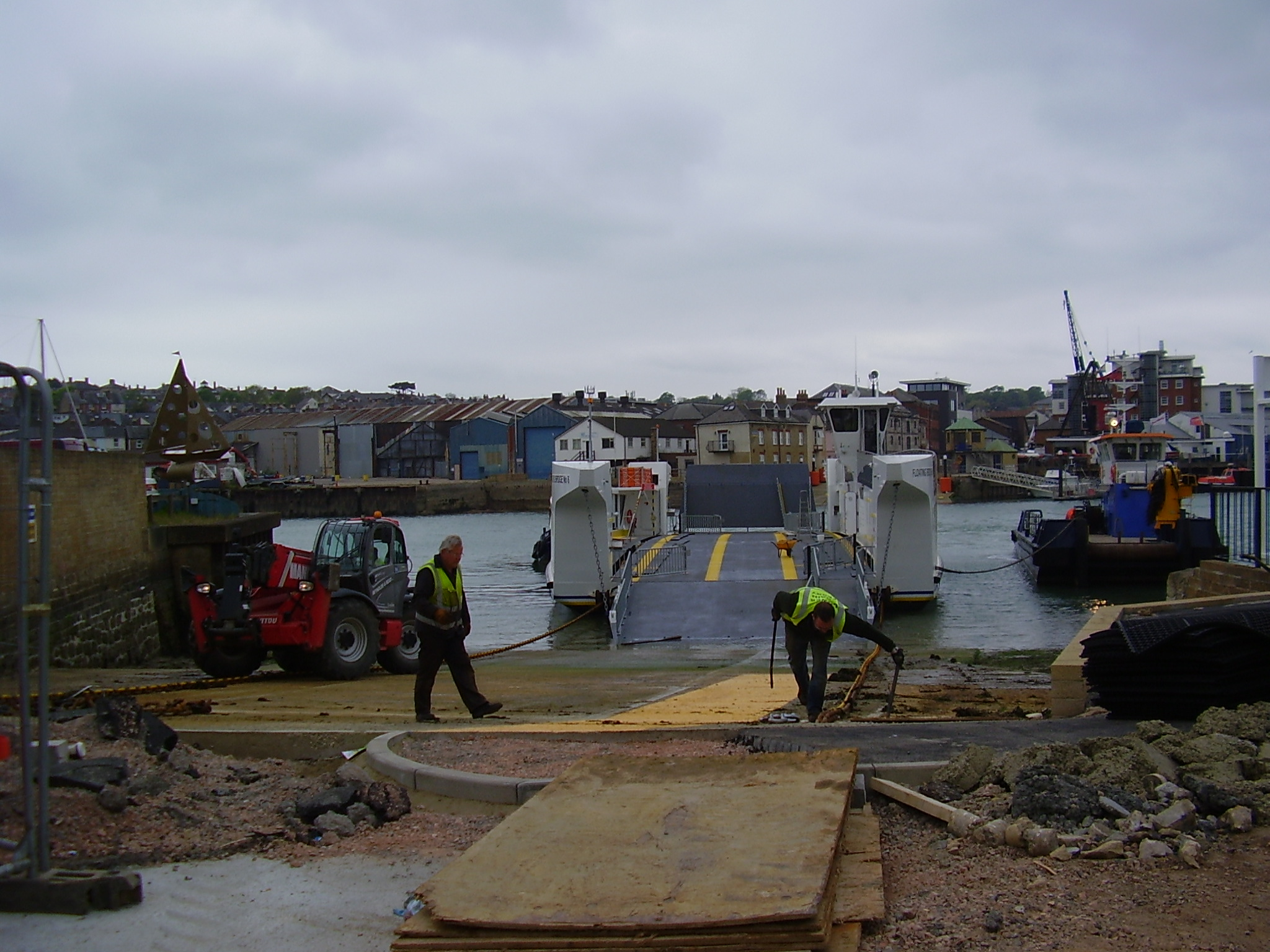
- Installing the new chain ferry, 3 May 2017

History

United Kingdom
- Name: Floating Bridge No.6
- Operator: Isle of Wight Council
- Builder: Mainstay Marine
- Launched: 2017
- In service: May 2017 - present
- Status: In service

General characteristics
- Decks: 1
- Speed: 5 knots (9.3 km/h)
- Capacity: 20 cars

The current vessel Floating Bridge No.6 was built by Welsh boat builders Mainstay Marine. It has an expected lifespan of 40 years and around twice the carrying capacity of the previous vessel, Floating Bridge No.5. It was installed on the Isle of Wight on 3 May 2017. Despite delays, the vessel's maiden voyage took place 10 days later on 13 May 2017. The following day, the vessel broke down due to a power cut, forcing passengers to wade through the River Medina to disembark the ferry. Further problems were caused by the angle of the slipway causing cars to scrape bumpers when loading and unloading from the East Cowes side. On 15 May 2017, the Maritime and Coastguard Agency suspended the service, citing "training issues". The temporary pedestrian launch which had been used after the previous vessel's retirement and the new vessel's installation was re-instated, but vehicles were once again forced to take the 10-mile round trip through Newport. After several months of suspension and intermittent operation, full service resumed in early 2018.

In March 2017, the Isle of Wight Council, which operates the floating bridge said it was open to suggestions from residents for a new name for the vessel after originally registering it as Floating Bridge No.6. Despite council officials ruling out "Floaty McFloatface" as a name, a petition was later created to name the vessel Floaty McFloatface, attracting over 2,000 signatures and even caused the council to rescind its decision to veto the name. Alternative name suggestions included Błyskawica, after the Polish warship that defended the towns of Cowes and East Cowes from a Nazi bombing raid during the Second World War. However, the council later stated it was postponing the naming of the vessel until some point after local elections took place later in the month.

=== Continued operational problems ===
By November 2018 a council document showed the costs of replacing the ferry had increased to £6.4 million. Operational problems since the vessels introduction had resulted in an increased reliance on additional passenger launch services whilst the floating bridge was out of service, which were largely blamed for the rise in costs.

Throughout 2019 the floating bridge suffered from a catalogue of problems leading to temporary suspensions in service. In February 2019 Isle of Wight Council leader Dave Stewart stated the designs of the bridge did not fit the requirements initially drawn up by the council, with the idea of pursuing legal action against Burness Corlett Three Quays (the company who provided technical specifications for the bridge) suggested.

In early July 2019 the service was suspended again to replace the vessel's chains. It was claimed they had come to the end of their workable life of three years having been re-used from the previous vessel. Later the same month the service suffered a further suspension, this time with a prow cable fault being blamed.

In August 2019 during the annual Cowes Week regatta the vessel ran aground forcing vehicles to reverse off on the East Cowes side. A temporary launch was put in place, however this struggled to cope with the increase in demand for journeys across the river that Cowes Week had created. The following day, after request from Cowes Harbour Commission the bridge was allowed to operate but only under the escort of safety boats to enable it to maintain its usual Cowes Week timetable.

September 2019 saw the issues continue with the floating bridge out of service again due to technical problems with the prow and hinge. Repairs were delayed causing continued disruption. Following extended delays it was brought back into service on 30 September 2019. It ended September having operated only 33.25% of its scheduled sailings. Issues around the vessel running aground continued, occurring again in October 2019.

The vessel was taken out of service in July 2020 for routine maintenance, at which time a serious hydraulic system fault was discovered. In September of the same year the Isle of Wight Council decided to take legal action against Mainstay Marine.

The vessel was taken out of service again in August 2021 due to engine problems. Engineers diagnosed a problem with one of the drive motors which requires replacement. The vessel was expected to be out of service for at least a month.

In April 2022 the ferry hit a sea wall while being brought back to the Medina from an inspection in Falmouth. This resulted in a further ten days out of service. A software issue caused the ferry to be pulled from service on the evening of Sunday 16 July 2023. It remained out of action for several weeks, making the ferry unavailable for Cowes Week.

In March 2024, the council confirmed that the ferry would be replaced. The ferry was out of action again in January 2025, due to a battery fault; crossings were expected to halt for 48 hours.
