= Whippingham =

Village on the Isle of Wight, England

Coordinates: 50.738°N 1.269°W

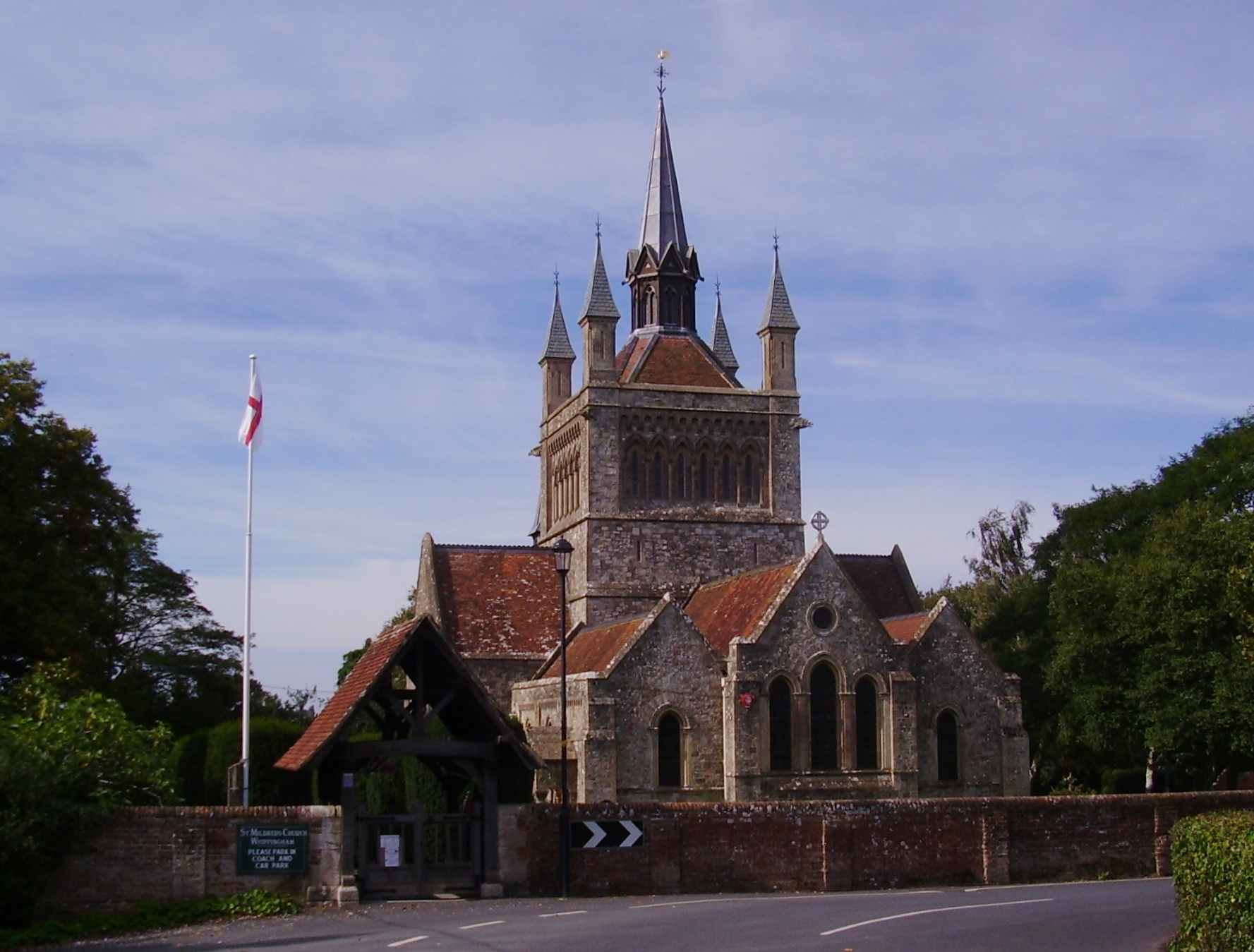
- St Mildred's Church, Whippingham

- Location within the Isle of Wight
- Population: 787 (2011 census)
- OS grid reference: SZ517934
- Civil parish: Whippingham
- Unitary authority: Isle of Wight
- Ceremonial county: Isle of Wight
- Region: South East
- Country: England
- Sovereign state: United Kingdom
- Post town: EAST COWES
- Postcode district: PO32
- Dialling code: 01983
- Police: Hampshire and Isle of Wight
- Fire: Hampshire and Isle of Wight
- Ambulance: Isle of Wight
- UK Parliament: Isle of Wight West

Whippingham is a village and civil parish on the Isle of Wight, England. The population of the civil parish at the 2011 Census was 787. It is located 1 1/2 miles (2.4 km) south of East Cowes in the north of the Island.

Whippingham is best known for its connections with Queen Victoria, especially St Mildred's Church, redesigned by Prince Albert. The village became the centre of the royal estate supporting Osborne House and Barton Manor. The farms, school, almshouses, forge and cottages were rebuilt when they became part of the Queen's estate and Prince Albert had a 'model farm' built at Barton. Queen Victoria took a close interest in 'her people' in Whippingham, providing for them in sickness and in health.

== Landmarks ==
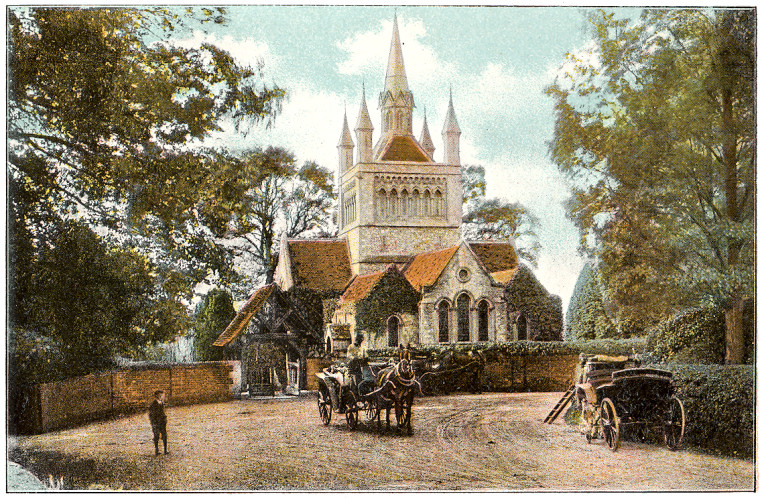
The Church c. 1910

=== St. Mildred's Church ===
St Mildred's Church is the Church of England parish church. Its close connection with Queen Victoria is reflected in the many memorials in the church and the churchyard which commemorate members of the Royal Family and the Royal Household. A side chapel is dedicated to the Battenberg/Mountbatten family. St Mildred's Church is now in a united benefice with St James's Church, East Cowes.

=== Barton Manor ===
Barton Manor is a Jacobean manor house in Whippingham, the most northerly of all manor houses on the Isle of Wight.

== Governance ==
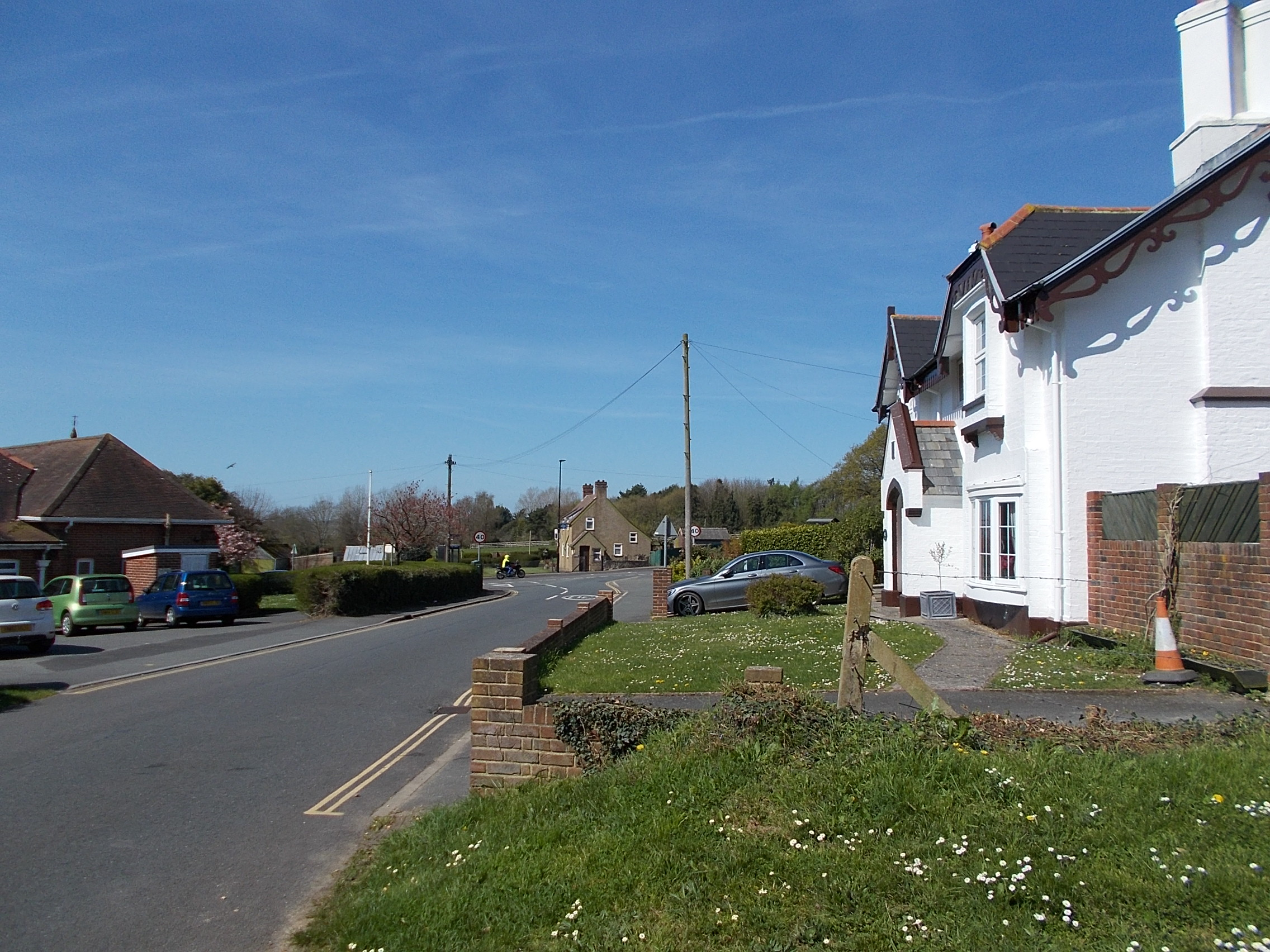
Whippingham village

Whippingham is part of the electoral ward called Whippingham and Osborne. This ward covers much of East Cowes and at the 2011 Census had a population of 3,818.

On 1 April 1933 the parish was abolished and merged with Newport, Cowes and Ryde. On 1 April 2008 Whippingham became a parish again.

== Transport ==
Southern Vectis bus routes 4 and 5 link the village with the towns of East Cowes, Newport and Ryde.

== See also ==
- HMS Whippingham, a Ham class minesweeper
