= St Mildred's Church, Whippingham =

Coordinates: 50°44′24″N 01°16′37″W

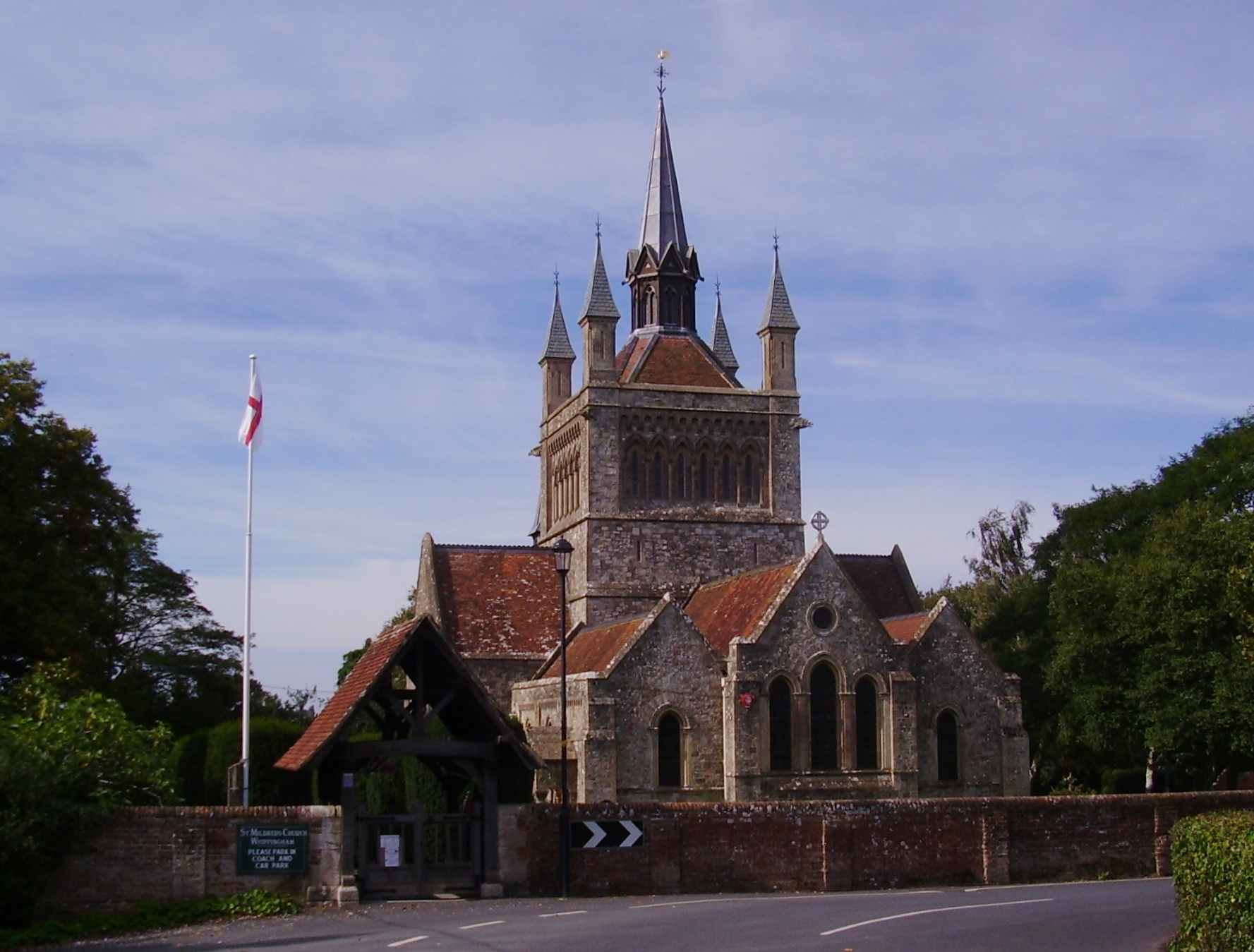
- St Mildred's Church, Whippingham
- Denomination: Church of England
- Churchmanship: Broad Church

History
- Dedication: St Mildred

Administration
- Province: Province of Canterbury
- Diocese: Portsmouth
- Archdeaconry: Isle of Wight
- Deanery: Isle of Wight
- Parish: Whippingham

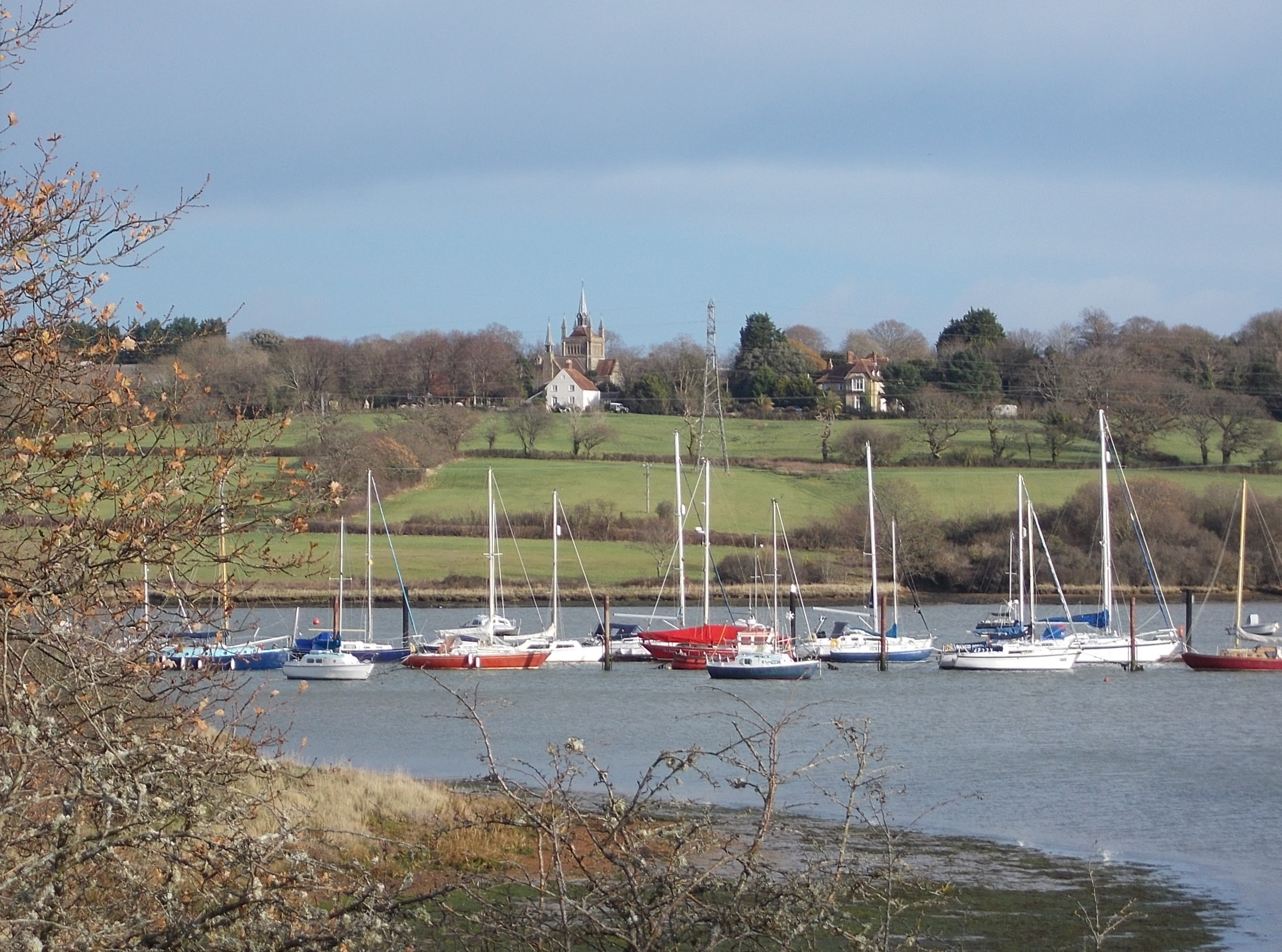
The setting of the church on the east bank of the River Medina.

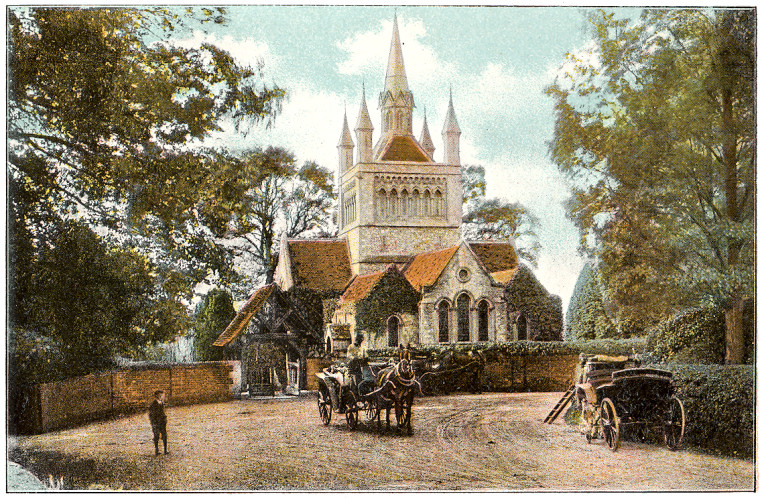
The church in around 1910.

St Mildred's Church, Whippingham is the Church of England parish church of the village of Whippingham, Isle of Wight.

== History ==
The village of Whippingham, and St Mildred's Church as its parish church, are best known for their connections with Queen Victoria. Whippingham was the centre of a royal estate supporting Osborne House and Barton Manor.

In 1804 a church was reconstructed by John Nash on the site of the lost medieval parish church: in 1854–60 it was pulled down and rebuilt. Prince Albert (the Prince Consort) took an active role in the redesigning of the church building. The chancel of the church was built in 1854 and 1855 by the architect Albert Jenkins Humbert although Prince Albert is thought to have had a guiding hand. The remainder of the church was constructed in 1861 and 1862.

A side chapel with the tomb of Prince Henry of Battenberg and Princess Beatrice, is dedicated to the Battenberg/Mountbatten family.

Queen Victoria took a close interest in 'her people' in Whippingham. This is reflected in the many memorials in St Mildred's Church which commemorate members of the Royal Family, including the Prince Consort, Princess Alice, Grand Duchess of Hesse and Prince Leopold, Duke of Albany and members of the royal household.

The church also has a memorial to the Hessian soldiers who fought under the British flag in the 1790s, and were invalided to the Isle of Wight. Soldiers from the Musketeer Regiment Prinz Carl were housed in the newly built Whippingham mill, which became a temporary barrack and hospital. Eighty-four of them are buried in the churchyard. The memorial was unveiled in 1906 by the Landgrave of Hesse.

The church is now in a united benefice with St James's Church, East Cowes.

== Interior ==
Inside the church, there are brilliant rose windows and a large octagonal lantern in the centre.

=== Organ ===
A specification of the Father Willis organ can be found on the National Pipe Organ Register.

=== Memorials ===
A number of memorials in the church commemorate members of Queen Victoria's family and household.

- Chancel
  - Queen Victoria Reredos presented by King Edward VII.
- North transept
  - Rt. Hon. Sir Henry Ponsonby, Private Secretary and Equerry to Queen Victoria and Keeper of Her Majesty's Privy Purse. A work in bronze by Lady Feodora Gleichen.
  - Lord Henry Seymour-Conway, second son of the Francis Seymour-Conway, 1st Marquess of Hertford.
  - William Arnold, Collector of His Majesty's Customs', died 1801. Father of Thomas Arnold, Headmaster of Rugby School.
  - Rev. Matthew Arnold, a Fellow of Corpus Christi College, Oxford, and Forces Chaplain, who was drowned at the age of 35.
- South Transept
  - Prince Henry of Battenberg. Brass Lectern
  - Canon Prothero (1818–1894), Chaplain to Her Majesty, Canon of Westminster and Deputy Clerk of the Closet and Rector of Whippingham.
- Battenberg Chapel
  - Tomb of Princess Beatrice and Prince Henry of Battenberg. A double sarcophagus of white marble, adorned with cast-iron sword.
  - Urn of The 1st Marquess of Carisbrooke. A brass casket set into a niche above his parents' double sarcophagus.
- West wall
  - Albert, Prince Consort
- South wall
  - Princess Alice of the United Kingdom
  - Prince Leopold, Duke of Albany
  - Prince Sigismund of Prussia (1864–1866)
  - Prince Waldemar of Prussia (1868–1879)

=== Burials ===
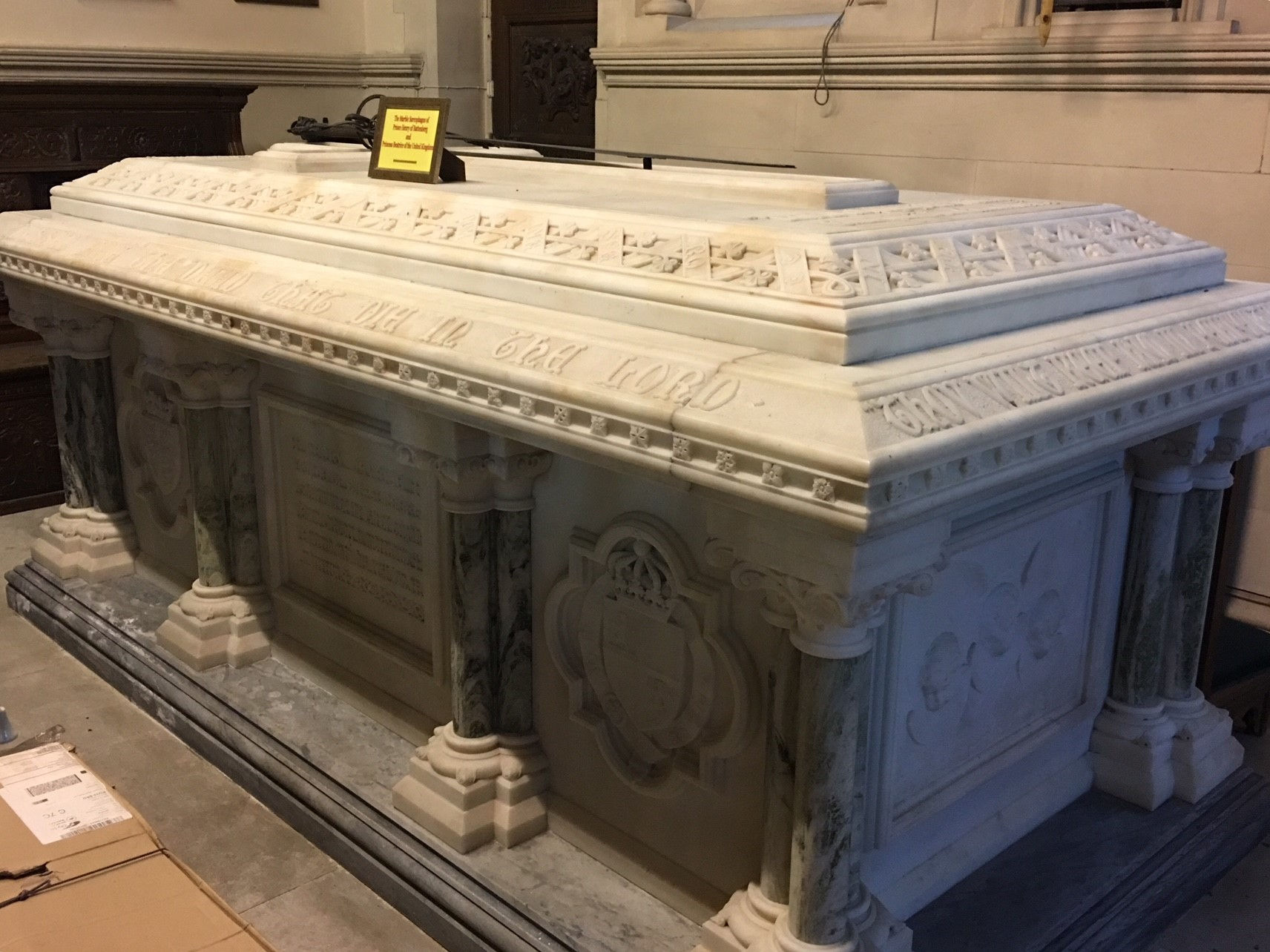
Tomb of Prince Henry of Battenberg and Princess Beatrice of the United Kingdom

St Mildred's Church contains the last resting places of several members of the Battenberg/Mountbatten family. Inside the church, in a side chapel called the 'Battenberg Chapel', are buried:

- Prince Henry of Battenberg (double sarcophagus with his wife, Princess Beatrice)
- Princess Beatrice of the United Kingdom (double sarcophagus with her husband, Prince Henry)
- The 1st Marquess of Carisbrooke (ashes in a brass casket above his parents' double sarcophagus)
- The Marchioness of Carisbrooke (ashes, photo)
- Lady Iris Mountbatten, daughter of the Marquess of Carisbrooke (ashes)
- The 3rd Marquess of Milford Haven (ashes, photo)

== Exterior ==
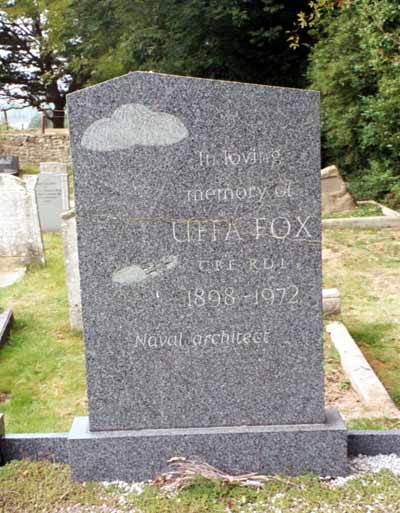
Grave of Uffa Fox, showing lifeboat of his design on parachute

The church has a tower reminiscent of a castle on the Rhine, with five soaring pinnacles.

=== Churchyard ===
In the churchyard are the graves of Prince Louis of Battenberg and his wife, Princess Victoria; also Uffa Fox, the yachtsman and designer.

The churchyard contains war graves of seven Commonwealth service personnel, four from World War I and three from World War II.
