= East Cowes =

Town on the Isle of Wight, England

Coordinates: 50.7570°N 1.2865°W

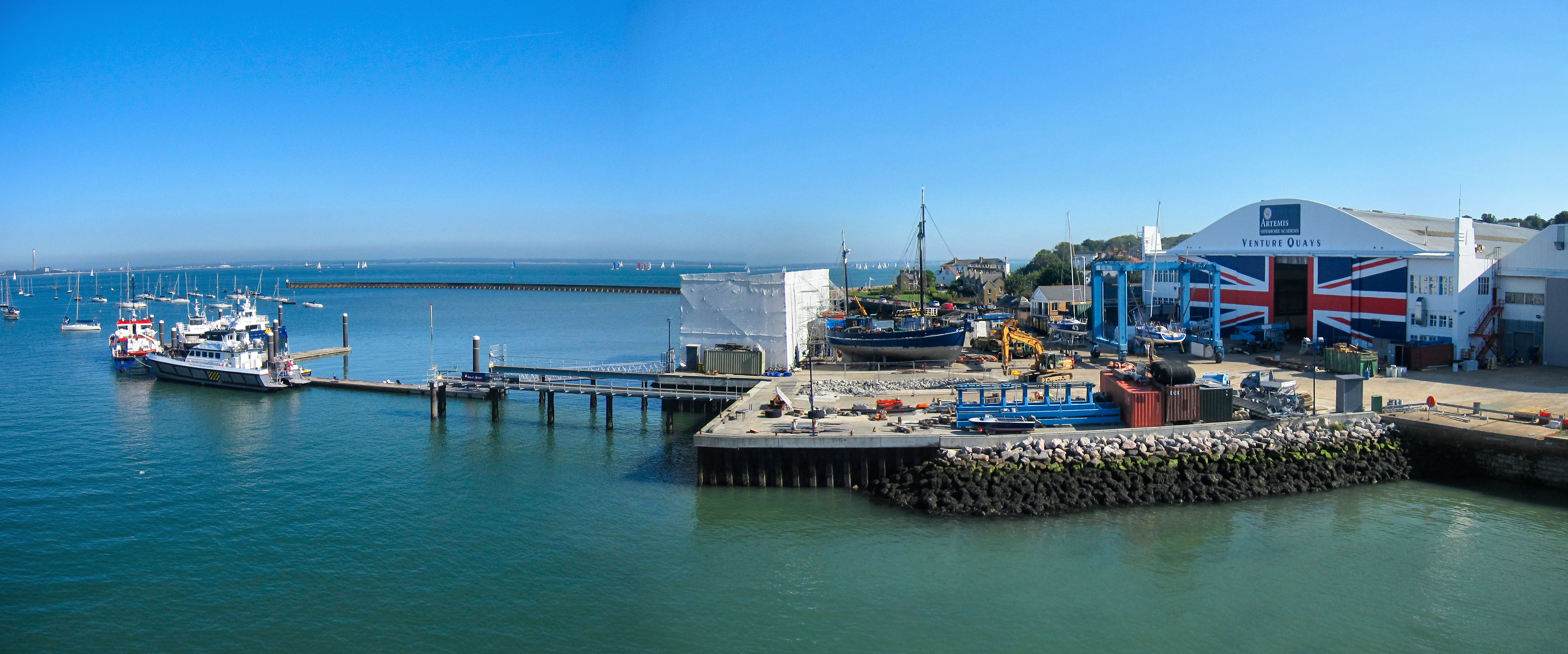
- East Cowes seafront, showing the Columbine Yard building with its Union Flag doors

- Location within the Isle of Wight
- Area: 5.0924 km^{2} (1.9662 sq mi)
- Population: 8,428 (2021 Census)
  - Density: 1,655/km^{2} (4,290/sq mi)
- OS grid reference: SZ493958
- Civil parish: East Cowes
- Unitary authority: Isle of Wight
- Ceremonial county: Isle of Wight
- Region: South East
- Country: England
- Sovereign state: United Kingdom
- Post town: EAST COWES
- Postcode district: PO32
- Dialling code: 01983
- Police: Hampshire and Isle of Wight
- Fire: Hampshire and Isle of Wight
- Ambulance: Isle of Wight
- UK Parliament: Isle of Wight West

East Cowes is a town and civil parish in the north of the Isle of Wight, on the east bank of the River Medina, next to its west bank neighbour Cowes. It has a population of 8,428 according to the 2021 Census.

The two towns are connected by the Cowes Floating Bridge, a chain ferry operated by the Isle of Wight Council.

East Cowes is the site of Norris Castle, and Osborne House, the former summer residence of Queen Victoria and Prince Albert. The Prince had a major influence on the architecture of the area, for example on the building of St Mildred's Church in nearby Whippingham, which features distinctive turrets imitating those found on a German castle.

== History ==
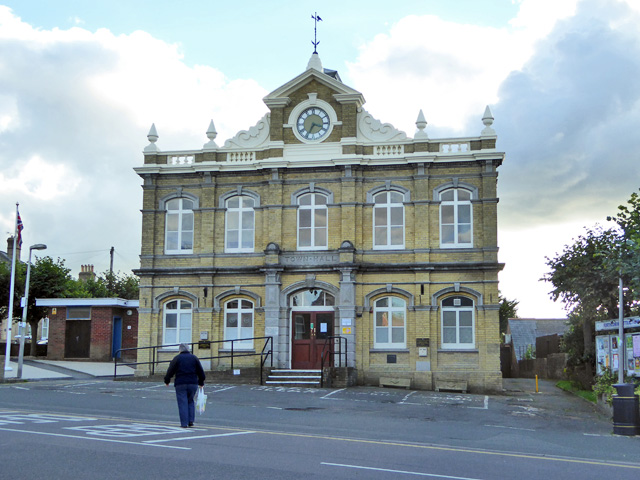
East Cowes Town Hall

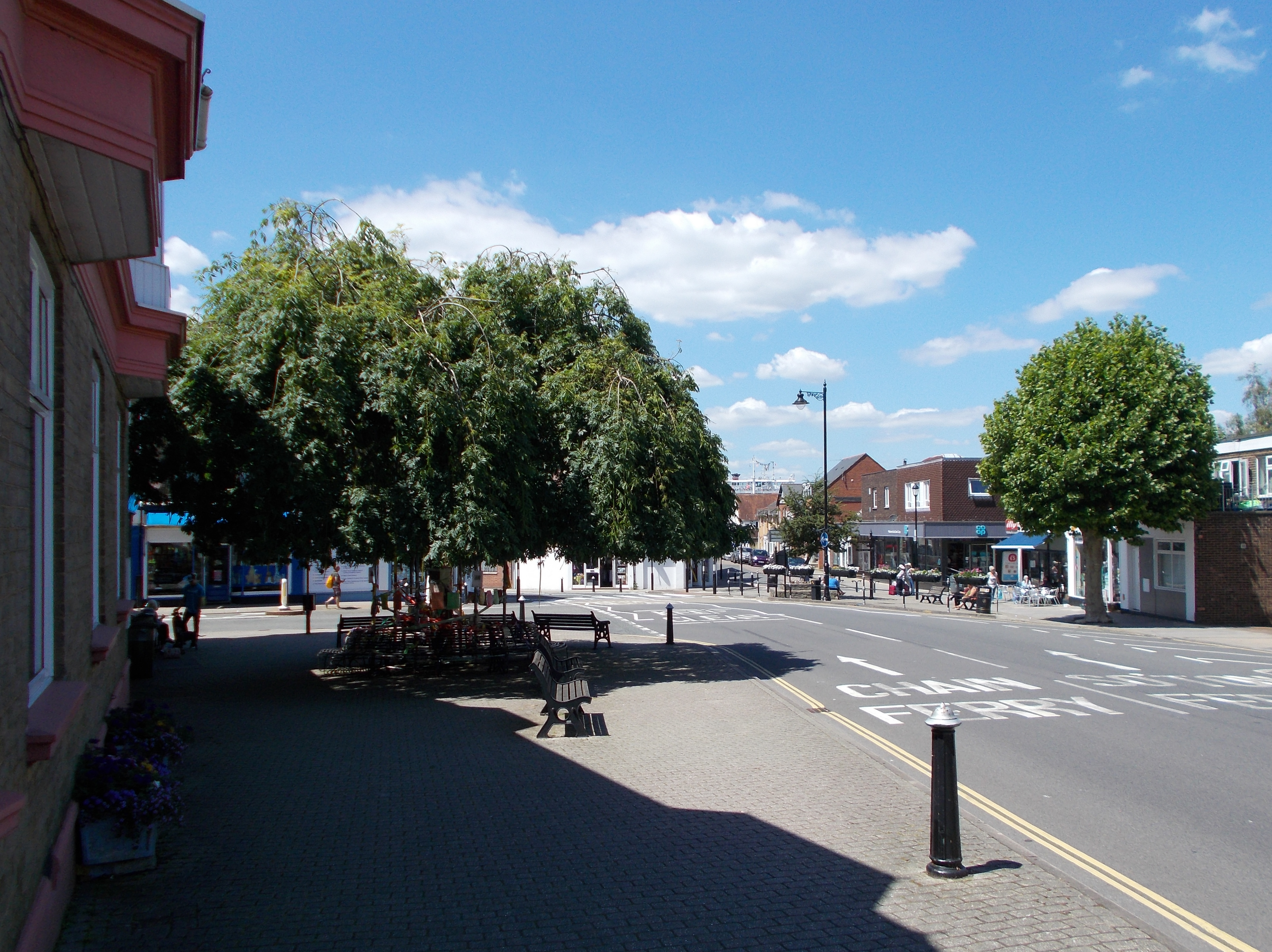
East Cowes town centre

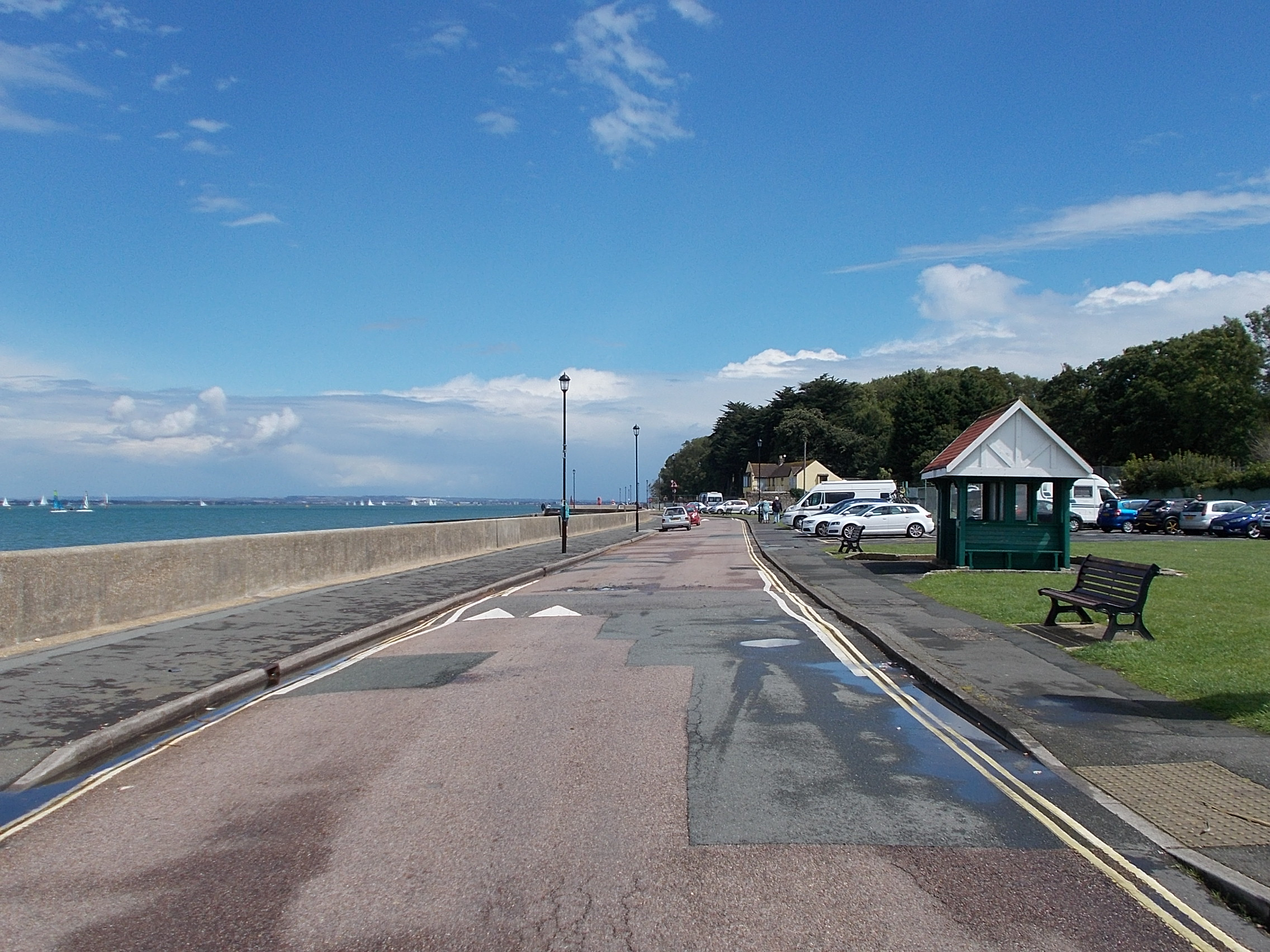
The Esplanade

In 1894 East Cowes became an urban district, the district contained only the parish of East Cowes, on 1 April 1933 the district and parish were abolished and merged with Cowes. East Cowes Urban District Council was based at East Cowes Town Hall. On 1 April 1998 East Cowes became a parish.

The name Estcowe (East Cowes) originally comes from one of two sandbanks each side of the River Medina estuary, so-called after a supposed likeness to cows. The name was subsequently transferred to fortifications built during the reign of Henry VIII on the east bank (East Cowes Castle) to dispel a French invasion, referred to as cowforts or cowes, which subsequently gave the name to the town. The naming of Cowes was done in a similar fashion. They replaced the earlier name of Shamblord.

The settlement of Shamblord at East Cowes was first recorded in 1303. It grew as East Shamblord, and became a much more significant settlement than the Western Shamblord. As the Isle of Wight was the target of frequent French invasions, with some notable incursions, the fort built at East Cowes was later destroyed and should not be confused with the "East Cowes Castle" built subsequently by John Nash.

During the reign of Queen Victoria, who made her summer home at Osborne by acquiring and rebuilding Osborne House, East Cowes was the subject of planned estate of grand houses, groves and parks. The scheme, not finding the finances it needed, folded, but a few residences built in the early stages still survive to this day such as the former Albert Grove residences of Kent House and Powys House on York Avenue.

In East Cowes Norris Castle was designed in the Norman style by James Wyatt in the late eighteenth century. The building survives and today remains a private home. In 1798, the architect John Nash, began building his home, East Cowes Castle, where he later entertained the Prince Consort and other prominent guests. East Cowes Castle was notable for its Gothic towers and turrets, and elaborate castellation. Nash died in 1835 and is buried in the tower of St James' Church which he also designed. East Cowes Castle was severely damaged by bombing in World War II. It was demolished during the 1960s, although the ice house remains and is visible in Sylvan Avenue.

During World War II, both Cowes and East Cowes became the targets of frequent bombing due to its industry and proximity to Southampton and the Royal Navy's home at Portsmouth. The shipyard of J. Samuel White was badly damaged by air attack in early May 1942 but, when rebuilt, innovative ship construction methods were introduced. The first warship completed by the renewed yard was HMS Cavalier. During the air raid, the local defences had been fortuitously augmented by the Polish destroyer Blyskawica (itself built by White's), which put up such a determined defence that, in 2002, the crew's courage was honoured by a local commemoration lasting several days to mark the 60th anniversary of the event. Later in 2004, and over to the west, an area of Cowes was named Francki Place in honour of the ship's commander.

To celebrate the Silver Jubilee of the Queen's coronation in 1977, the main hangar doors of what was then the British Hovercraft Corporation (a successor to Saunders Roe) were painted with the world's largest image of the Union Jack, which can still be seen today.

In January 2015, the car carrier Höegh Osaka bound for Bremerhaven, Germany, ran aground on Bramble Bank after developing a heavy list, roughly five miles (eight kilometres) north of the entrance to the River Medina. It has since been re-floated, repaired, and returned to service.

== Transport ==
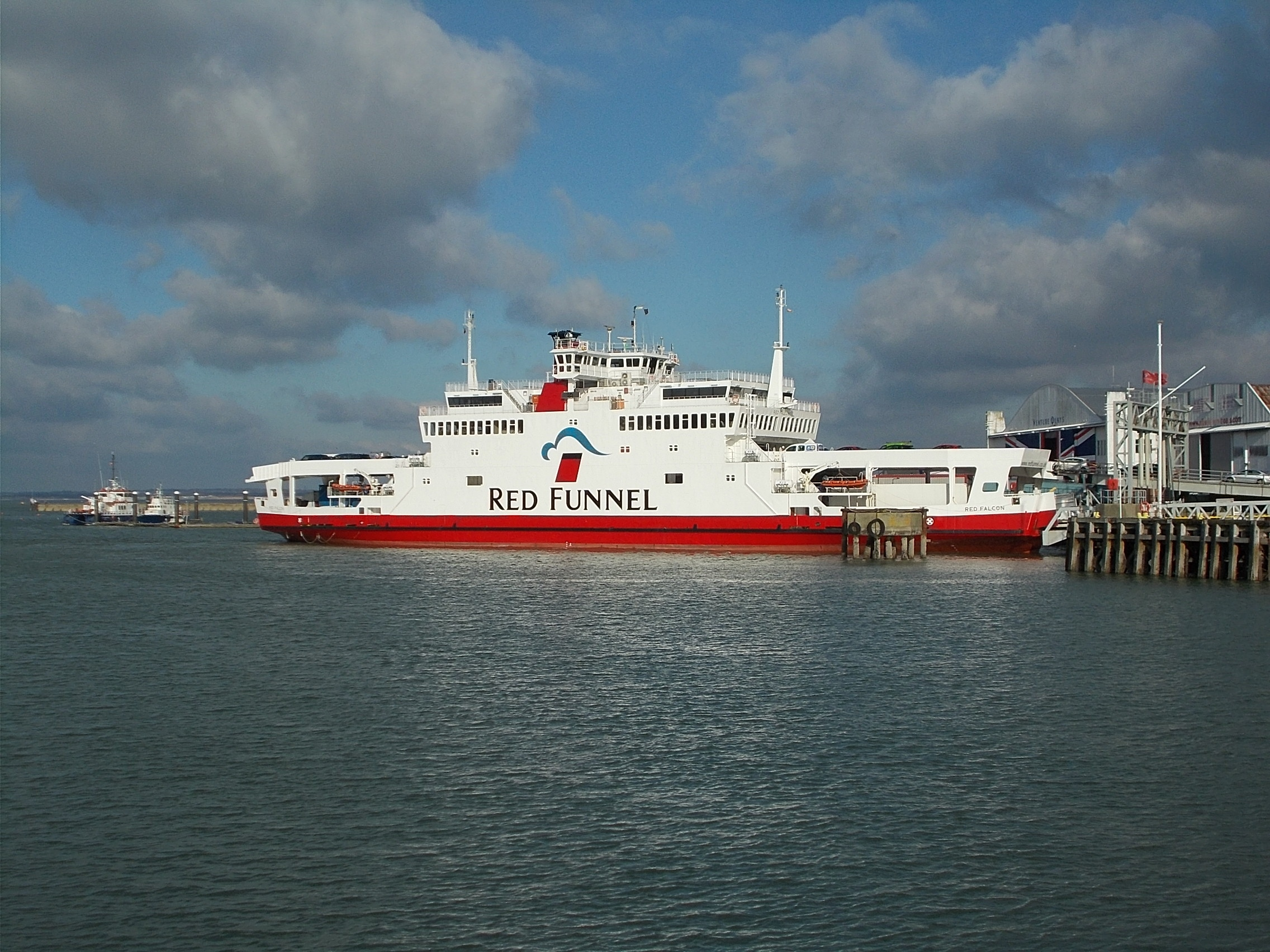
Red Funnel car ferry Red Falcon at East Cowes ferry terminal

East Cowes is linked to the mainland by Red Funnel's vehicle ferry service. The Cowes Floating Bridge links East Cowes with Cowes throughout the day. It is a chain ferry, and is one of the few remaining not to be replaced by a physical bridge.

Southern Vectis operate bus route 4 linking the town with Ryde and bus routes 5 and 25 linking the town with Newport including intermediate villages.

The Isle of Wight Coastal Path runs through East Cowes.

== Industry ==
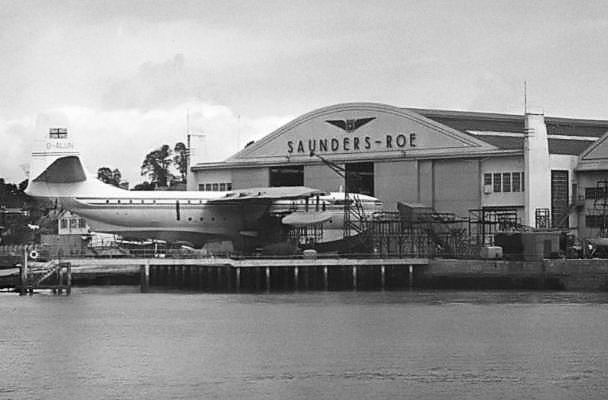
Saunders Roe East Cowes works in 1954 with Princess flying-boat

Local industry in both Cowes and East Cowes has always centred on the building and design of marine craft and materials associated with boatmaking, including the early flying boats, and sailmaking.

East Cowes was also once home to the aircraft manufacturer Saunders Roe, who built the large, advanced, flying boat The Saunders-Roe Princess, as well as the Black Knight rocket and the Black Arrow satellite carrier rocket. They also developed and tested the first hovercraft, the SR.N1.

The former Saunders-Roe factory at Venture Quays now produces wind turbines, which can be seen laid on the quay for shipping out. Due to local objections no wind turbines have been allowed to be erected on the Isle of Wight.

== Sport and leisure ==
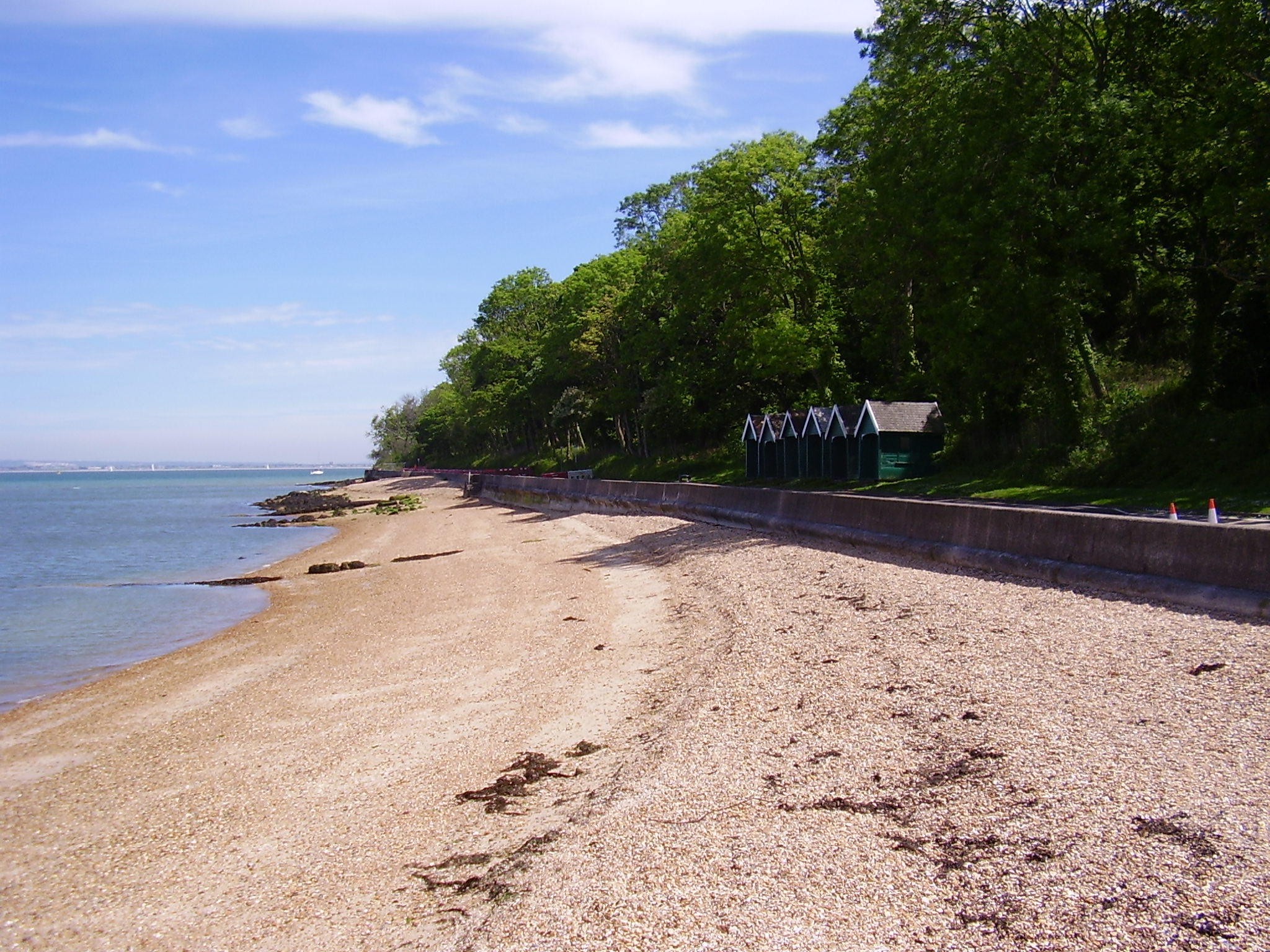
The beach at East Cowes

East Cowes has a Non-League football club East Cowes Victoria Athletic A.F.C., which plays at Beatrice Avenue. They are also home to FC Bayern Bru who play in the islands Leisure Leagues 6-a-side league at Beatrice Avenue. They won the league title in their inaugural season in the winter of 2013.

== Notable residents ==
- Queen Victoria and Prince Albert
- Princess Henry of Battenberg, later known as Princess Beatrice of the United Kingdom, who resided at Osborne Cottage
- Seb Clover (born 1987), set the world record in 2003 as the youngest cross-Atlantic solo yachtsman, and lived in East Cowes
- Sir Christopher Cockerell, inventor of the hovercraft, lived at White Cottage
- Roscow George Shedden, colonial bishop of Nassau
- John Nash, architect
- John Vereker, 6th Viscount Gort, World War II field marshal and commander of the British Expeditionary Force
- Lord Mountbatten (in childhood), later last viceroy of India at Kent House, East Cowes

== Redevelopment project ==
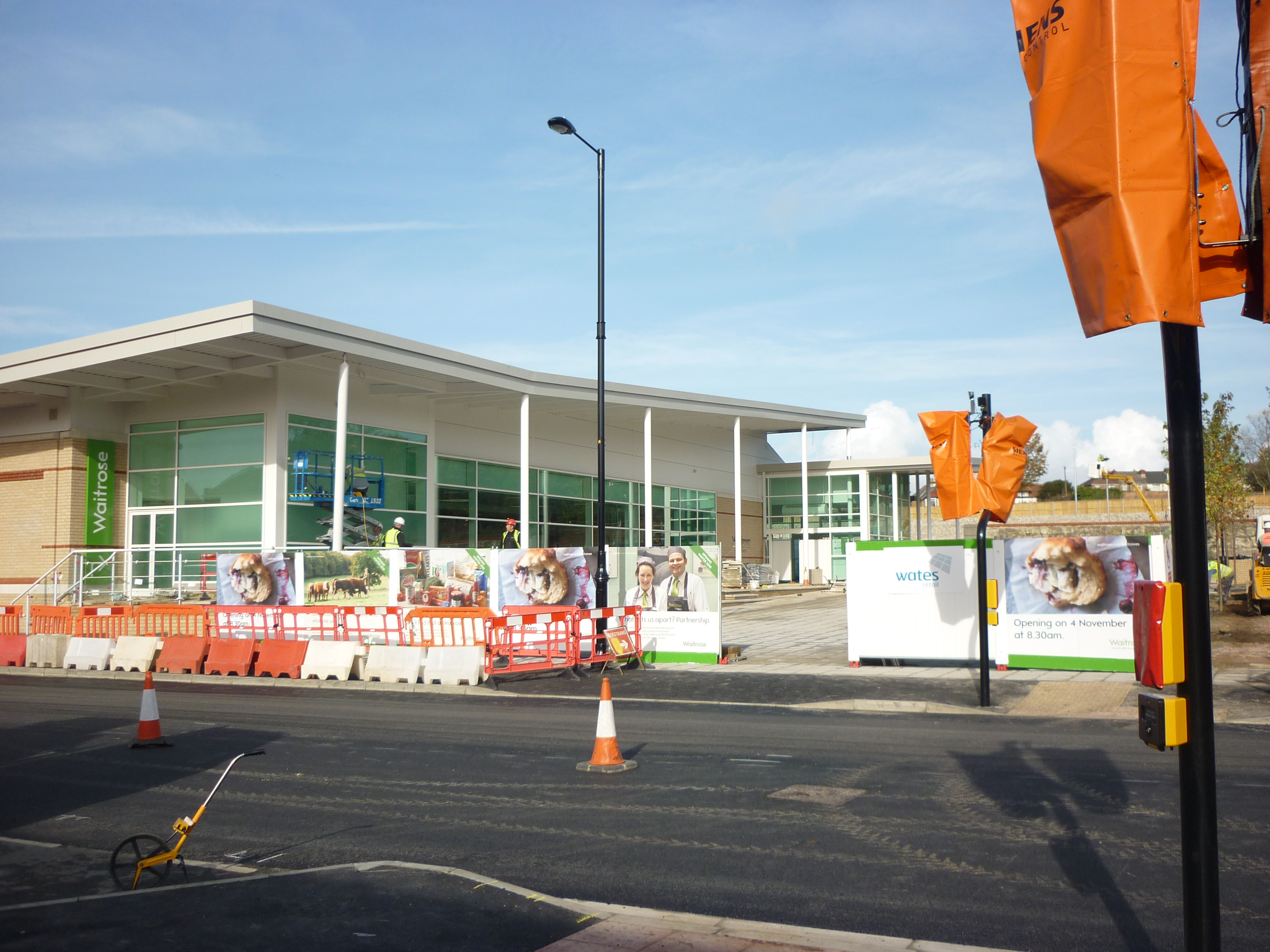
The progress of the new East Cowes Waitrose store, which is now open. It has now become a centre of the town's shopping industry.

The East Cowes Redevelopment Project was set up by SEEDA https://www.iow.gov.uk/azservices/documents/2780-41-08%20Appendix%20A.pdf for the flagship project for the Cowes Waterfront Initiate, which includes redeveloping the town centre of East Cowes. It was intended that such changes would create better employment opportunities and a better environment for residents and visitors alike, providing a unique opportunity to improve East Cowes and create better investment for businesses.

On 6 April 2010, work started on the new Waitrose store on Well Road on the old site of the hovercraft development building. Recruitment for jobs for the new Waitrose Store started during August/September 2010; there were 160 jobs available throughout the store and over 800 people applied.

Part of the redevelopment also included the building of more houses known as "Victoria Walk" and David Wilson was chosen to be the builder. Advertising boards were placed on Old Road in East Cowes with building work commencing soon after.

In 2013, work began to create a new 300 berth marina inside a new breakwater. The plan included a new hotel, restaurant and 100 homes.

During August 2012, a new medical centre opened at Church Path, near Waitrose. The former medical centre at Down House (the former home of respected local GP Dr Down), on York Avenue, was closed.

== Library ==
During December 2010, under a cost-cutting plan by the Isle of Wight Council it was decided most local libraries across the Island would close in March 2011, with just Newport and Ryde remaining open. Sandown, Cowes, Ventnor & Freshwater remained open until March 2012, during which time community groups were sought to continue the upkeep and running of the libraries.

East Cowes was one of the libraries set to close in March 2011, but was saved by East Cowes Town Council who appealed for volunteers to continue running the library. It remains at the town centre premises near to the Co-op supermarket, with an outlook to move to newer premises in the near future. Whilst under the Isle of Wight Council ownership it opened around 30 hours a week; this was reduced to around 12 hours per week.

== See also ==
- St. James's Church, East Cowes
- East Cowes Castle
- Frank James Hospital
- List of current places of worship on the Isle of Wight
