= Northwood, Isle of Wight =

Coordinates: 50.7436°N 1.3149°W

Northwood
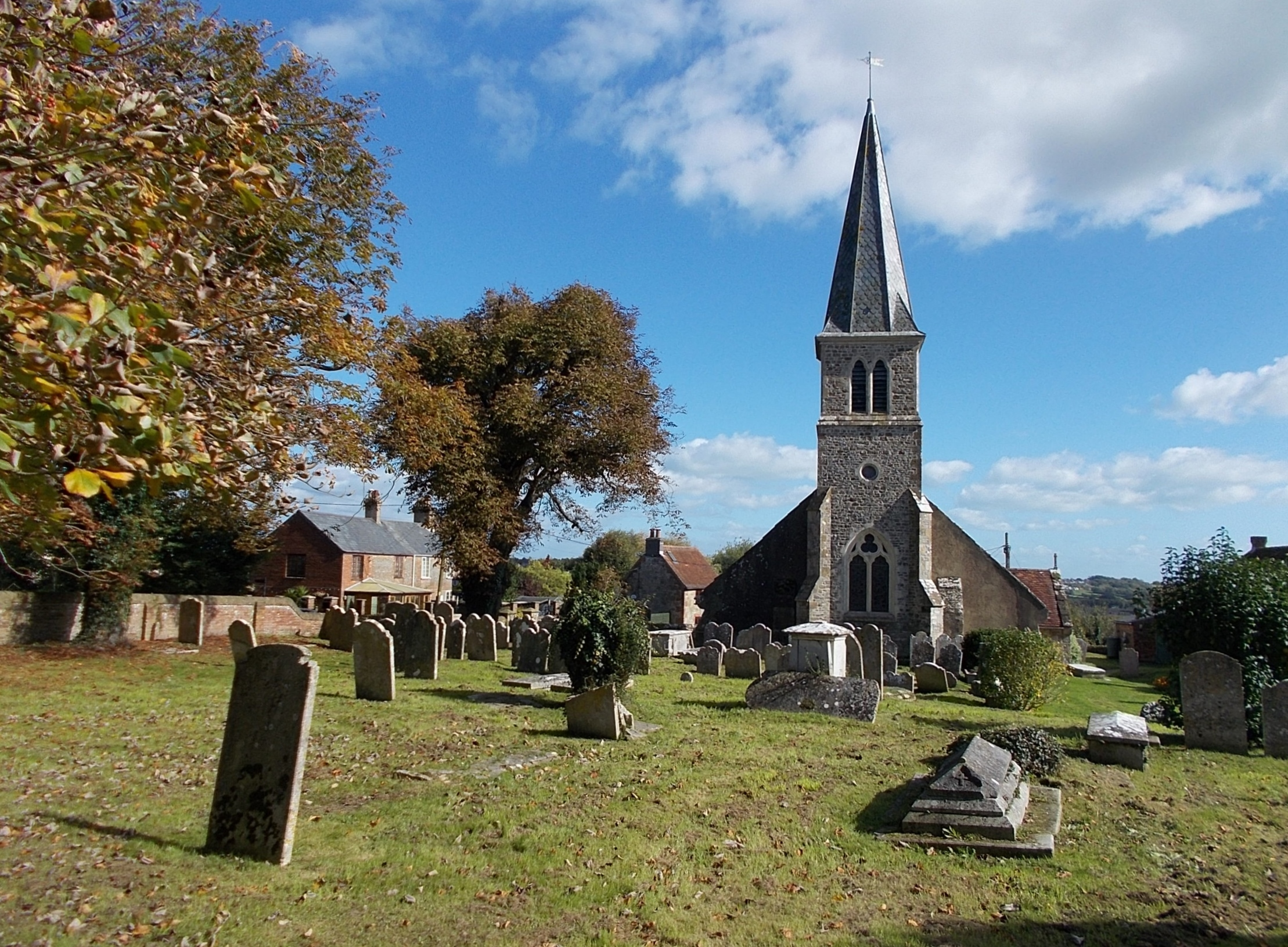
- Northwood Church

- Location within the Isle of Wight
- Population: 2,311 (2011 Census including Egypt Point)
- OS grid reference: SZ484940
- Unitary authority: Isle of Wight
- Ceremonial county: Isle of Wight
- Region: South East
- Country: England
- Sovereign state: United Kingdom
- Post town: COWES
- Postcode district: PO31
- Dialling code: 01983
- Police: Hampshire and Isle of Wight
- Fire: Hampshire and Isle of Wight
- Ambulance: Isle of Wight
- UK Parliament: Isle of Wight West

Northwood is a village and civil parish on the Isle of Wight. It lies south of the town of Cowes and has been occupied for about 1000 years. The Church of St John the Baptist in Northwood, was first built between the 11th and 13th centuries.

== Name ==
Its name means 'the northern wood', from Old English north and wudu, named from its location from Parkhurst Forest.

1181-1185: Nortwuda

Early 13th century: Northwwde

1248: Northwode

1250-1260: Northewode

1535: Northwoode

== History ==
There is a primary school in Northwood which was first begun in 1855. Until 1990 it still featured an outside toilet.

The main form of transport is Southern Vectis bus route 1, which runs every 7–8 minutes in the daytime to Cowes and Newport, along the main road. Local bus service route 32 is provided by the setting up of a Joint Scheme involving Southern Vectis and the Parish Council mid-2011. Several changes to this route have occurred after Southern Vectis withdrew their 27 to Cowes and 28 to Newport.

Arthur Watson, a cricketer, was from Northwood.

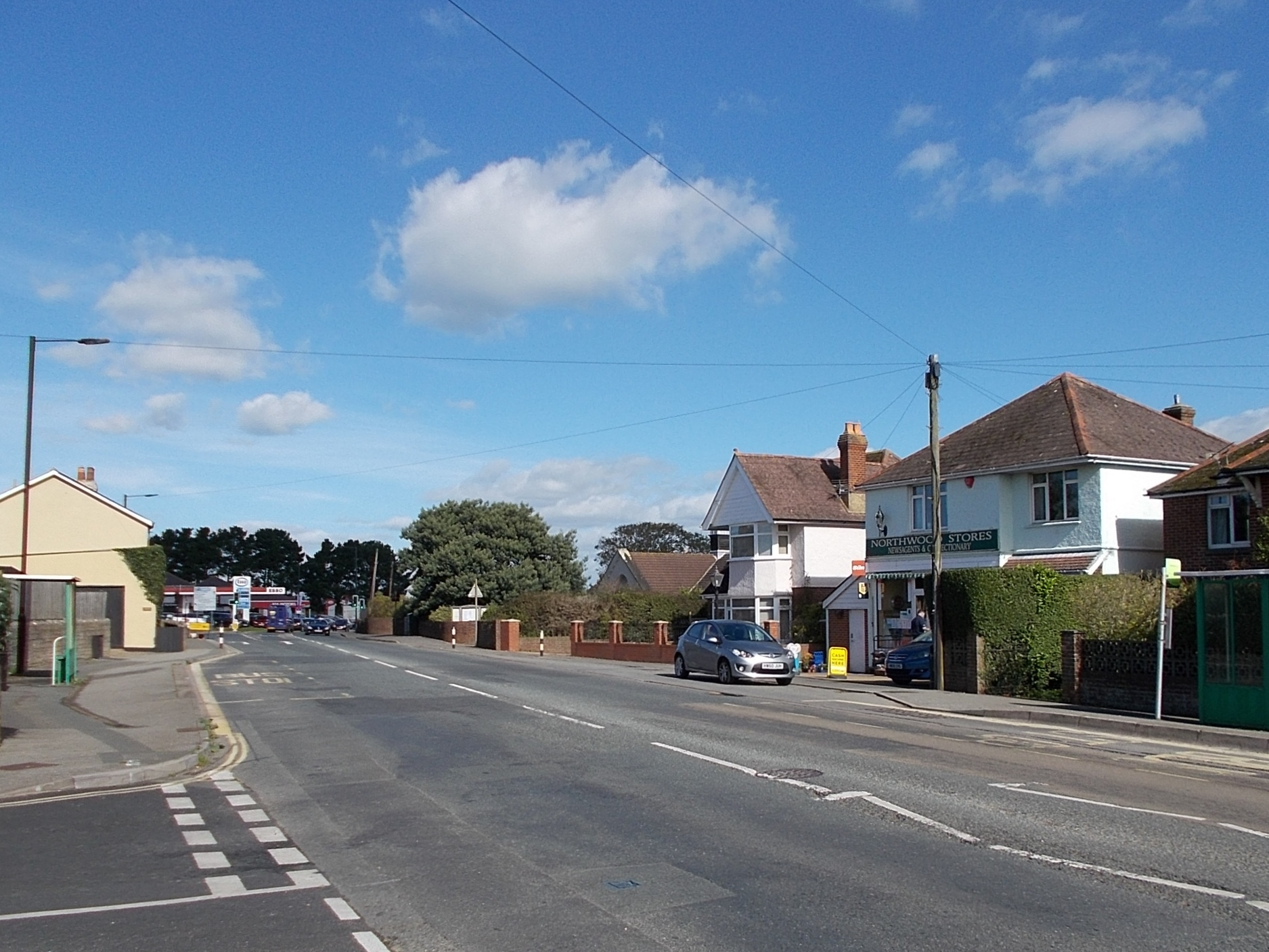
Northwood village

== See also ==
- Northwood House
