= Zephyr (schooner) =

History

United States
- Name: Zephyr
- Owner: Russell & Company
- Builder: Samuel Hall, East Boston
- Launched: April 12, 1842

General characteristics
- Tons burthen: 150 tons
- Sail plan: Topsail schooner
- Armament: Four brass 18-pounders, a brass 18-pounder pivot gun, and an Armstrong 68-pounder

Zephyr was an 1842 opium clipper built by Samuel Hall, East Boston that was known for its speed.

Zephyr, Brenda, Mazeppa, Ariel, and the brig Antelope were among Russell & Companys fastest opium clippers, and enabled the company to almost control the opium trade with China.

The Zephyr was built by Samuel Hall, of East Boston, on the American pilot boat model. Though lightly built, like most American ships, of American oak and elm, she was beautifully modelled and very heavily sparred; and she carried an armament of four brass 18-pounders to a broadside, a brass 18-pounder pivot gun on the foc's'le, also of brass, and, in her prime, an Armstrong 68-pounder on a pivot between the masts. Zephyr was "built as a yacht to the order of Daniel Burn of Canton" and Captain R. B. Forbes. Launched April 12, 1842, she sailed on her first passage to China on May 15, 1842, under Captain Thomas M. Johnson, arriving 112 days later.

Captain Thomas M. Johnson, wrote to Forbes in 1843:

" The Zephyr is now in the Taypa with loss of main boom, fore-gaff, and jib. I was caught off the Grand Ladrone in a gale at north-east. She did well till the jib was lost, and we beat from the Ladrone to here under double-reefed sails and storm jib quicker than anything in China could have done it. None of the vessels I have met could beat her. On the wind I do believe there is not anything that can beat her. When in ballast she is as dry as any of them. In smooth water, on the wind, her equal is not to be found in China or elsewhere, in my opinion. Properly ballasted she is the easiest vessel I was ever aboard of.

During the Taiping Rebellion the opium clipper Eamont ran up to the threatened city of Ningbo, passing right through the Battle of Chinhae, which was being waged not only on the banks but in the river itself. At Ningbo she found the Zephyr. The two schooners loaded up with fugitive celestials, and raced each other back to Wusong. But in the smooth sheltered water of the river, and with a fresh whole sail breeze, the Zephyr more than a match for the more strongly built Cowes schooner. However, the Eamont had her revenge in weather more to her choice. The two vessels met this time in half a gale of wind with a heavy sea running, and the Eamont sailed right dead to windward of the Zephyr, and left her out of sight in twelve hours.
