= St Mary the Virgin Church, Cowes =

Coordinates: 50.7633°N 1.3019°W

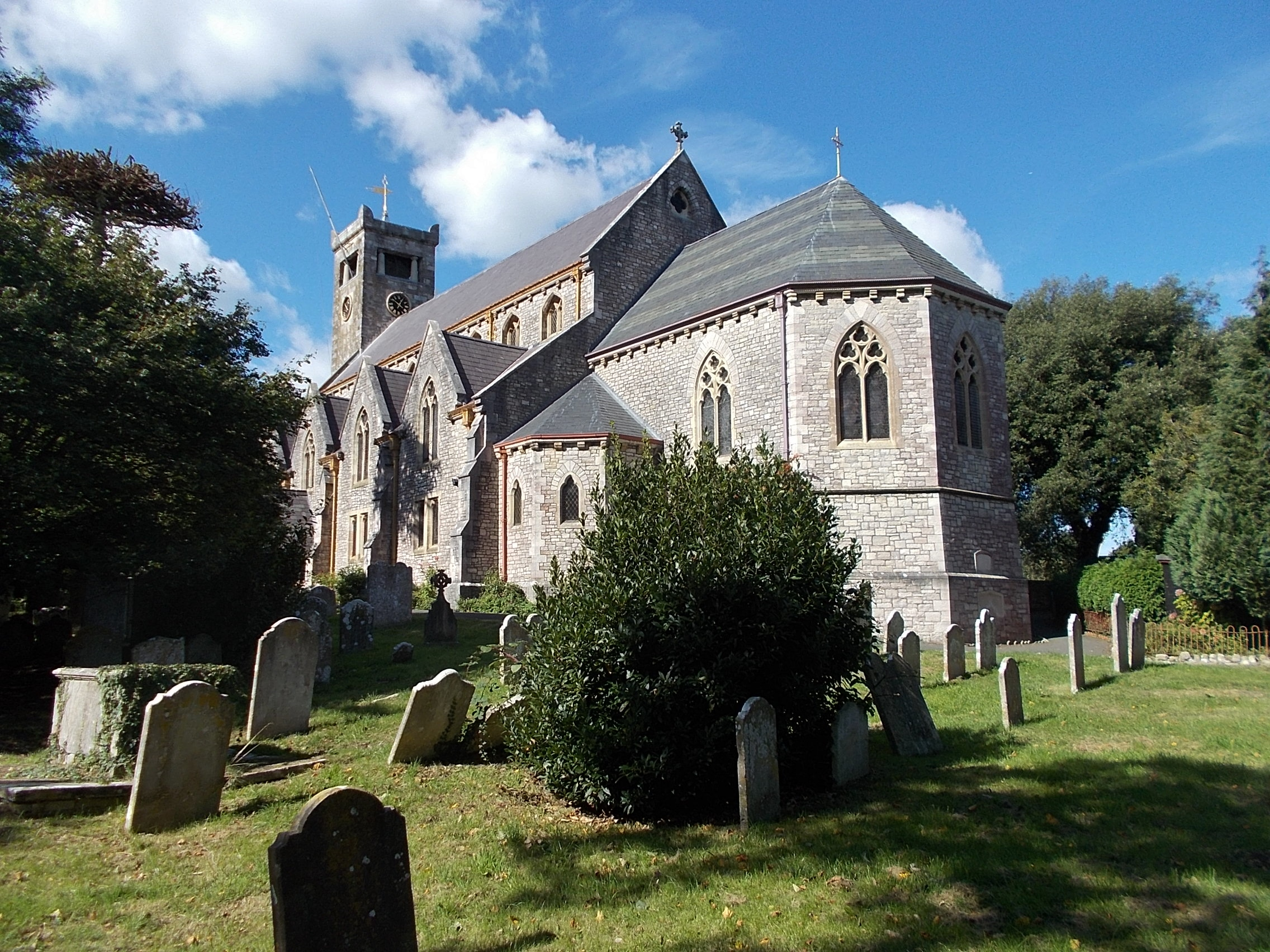
- St Mary the Virgin Church, Cowes

- Location on the Isle of Wight
- Denomination: Church of England
- Churchmanship: Broad Church
- Website: St Mary the Virgin Church, Cowes

History
- Dedication: St Mary

Architecture
- Heritage designation: II*
- Designated: 17 August 1951
- Architect(s): Tower by John Nash, nave and chancel by Arthur Cates
- Style: Greek Revival tower, Gothic Revival nave and chancel
- Completed: 1867

Administration
- Province: Canterbury
- Diocese: Portsmouth
- Archdeaconry: Isle of Wight
- Deanery: West Wight
- Parish: Holy Trinity and Saint Mary

Clergy
- Vicar: Rev Ryan Cook

St Mary the Virgin Church, Cowes is a Church of England parish church in Cowes, Isle of Wight. It is in Church Road, next to Northwood House.

== History ==
The first church on the site was built in 1657, during the Commonwealth of England. A chancel designed by Joseph Richards was added in 1811. John Nash designed the west tower, which was added in 1816. It is unusual for being in a Greek Revival style. In 1867 the whole church except for the west tower was rebuilt to Gothic Revival designs by the architect Arthur Cates.

== Parish and benefice ==
The church is part of a single benefice with Holy Trinity Church, Cowes.

== Organ ==
The church has a two-manual organ, originally built by Henry Willis & Sons. Its specification is on the National Pipe Organ Register.
