= Cowes =

Town in Isle of Wight, England

Coordinates: 50.7595°N 1.3002°W

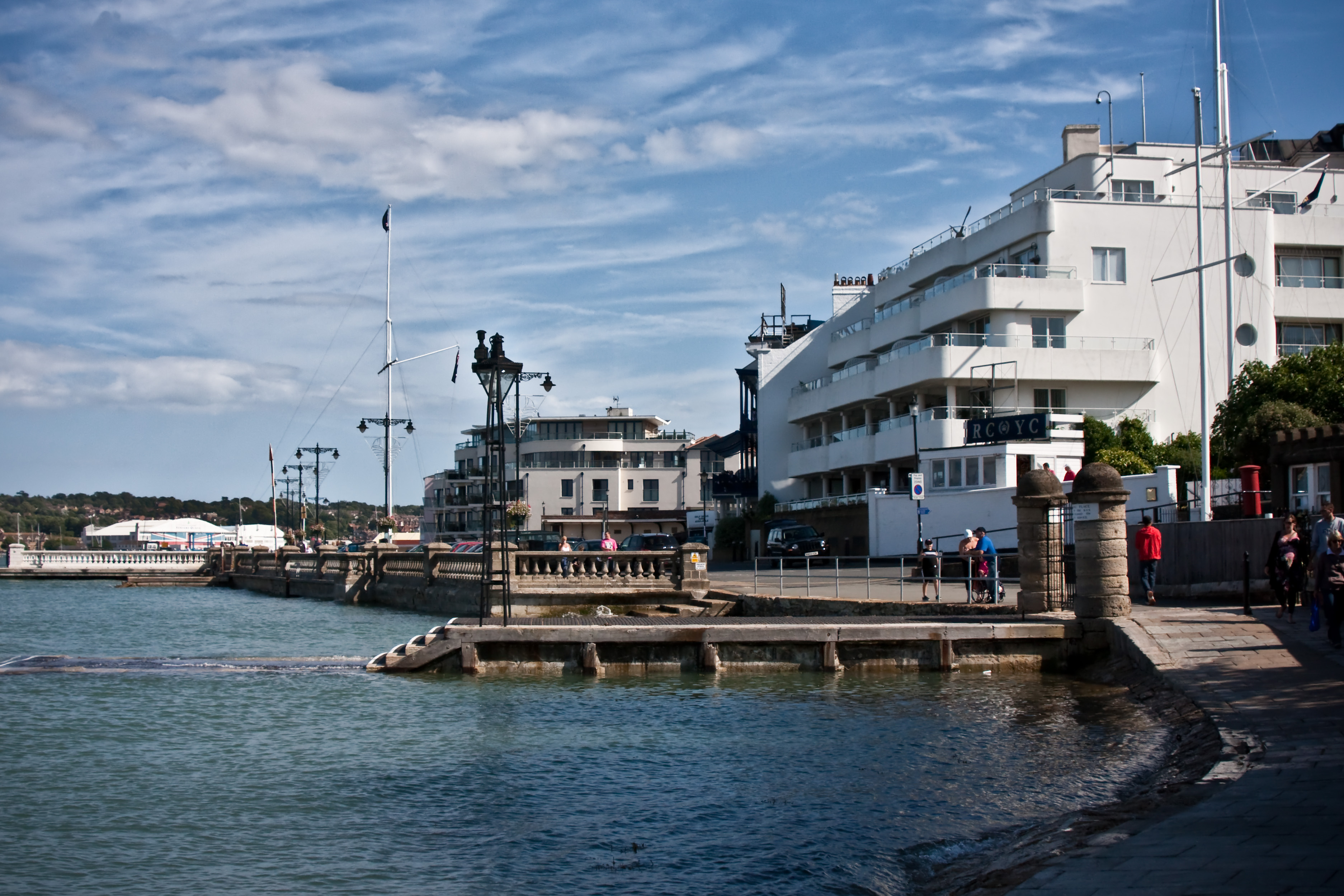
- Cowes Parade

- Location within the Isle of Wight
- Area: 2.8 km^{2} (1.1 sq mi)
- Population: 14,370 (2021 Census)
  - Density: 5,132/km^{2} (13,290/sq mi)
- OS grid reference: SZ493958
- Civil parish: Cowes
- Unitary authority: Isle of Wight
- Ceremonial county: Isle of Wight
- Region: South East
- Country: England
- Sovereign state: United Kingdom
- Post town: COWES
- Postcode district: PO31
- Dialling code: 01983
- Police: Hampshire and Isle of Wight
- Fire: Hampshire and Isle of Wight
- Ambulance: Isle of Wight
- UK Parliament: Isle of Wight West

Cowes (/kaʊz/) is an English seaport town and civil parish on the Isle of Wight, England. Cowes is located on the west bank of the estuary of the River Medina, facing the smaller town of East Cowes on the east bank. The two towns are linked by the Cowes Floating Bridge, a chain ferry.

Cowes has a population of 14,370 according to the 2021 Census.

Charles Godfrey Leland's 19th-century verses describe the towns poetically as "The two great Cowes that in loud thunder roar/This on the eastern, that the western shore".

Cowes has been seen as a home for international yacht racing since the founding of the Royal Yacht Squadron in 1815. It gives its name to one of the world's oldest regular regatta, Cowes Week, which occurs annually in the first week of August. Later, powerboat races are held.

Much of the town's architecture is still heavily influenced by the style of ornate building that Prince Albert popularised.

== History ==
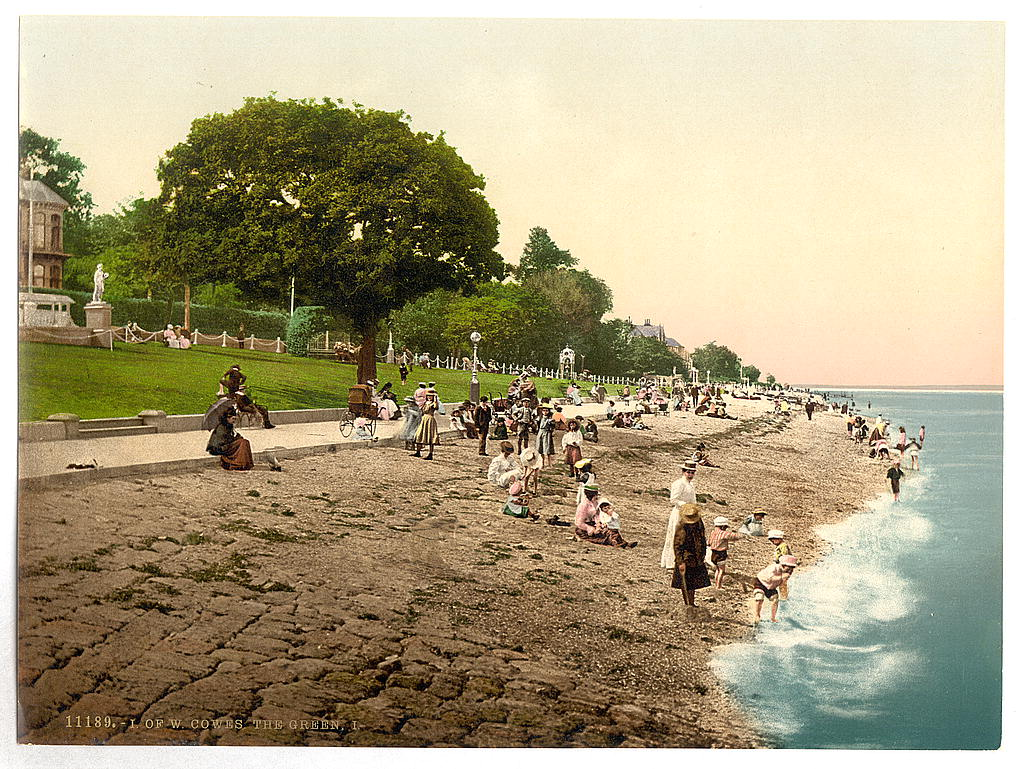
Cowes, ca. 1890 - 1900

On 1 April 1933 East Cowes urban district was abolished and merged with Cowes, parts of the parishes of Northwood and Whippingham from the Isle of Wight Rural District were also moved to Cowes. On 1 April 1974 the district and parish were abolished and became part of Medina non-metropolitan district in the non-metropolitan and ceremonial county of the Isle of Wight. No successor parish was formed so it became unparished. On 1 April 1985 the parishes of Cowes and Gurnard were formed from part of the unparished area. In 1995 Medina district was merged with South Wight and Cowes became part of the Isle of Wight unitary authority area, in 1998 the parish of East Cowes was formed from part of the unparished area, on 1 April 2008 the rest of the unparished area was parished as Northwood and Whippingham.

=== Name ===
Both Cowes and East Cowes were originally named from Estcowe and Westcowe, two sandbanks on each side of the estuary of the River Medina, named from their resemblance to cows. Other coastal features are also named from animals: Horse Ledge near Shanklin, Cow Ledge near Little Atherfield and Bouldnor Cliffs. In ~1539, when Henry VIII built two blockades or forts to defend from French and Spanish invaders, they were known as the Est Cow and the West Cow, recorded in The Itinerary of John Leland (1535-1543). The plural name The Cowes was given to both Cowes and East Cowes until 1769, as their modern names were given to them then.

An older name may have been Shamelord, recorded in the 13th century. It still survives today, in the name Shambler's Copse, from Old English sceamol (shelf, ledge) and ord (point, spit of land)

The town's name has been subject to dispute in the past, sometimes being called Cowes, and then West Cowes. For example, a milestone from the 17th century exists, calling the town Cowes, but up until the late 19th Century the Urban District Council bore the name West Cowes. In 1895 West Cowes Urban District Council applied for permission to change the name of the town to Cowes officially, and this was granted on 21 August 1895.

Whilst the name Cowes has become well established on infrastructure related to the town (including maps, road signage and postal addresses), the name West Cowes remained on Admiralty charts, used by sailors, until 2015, when it was corrected following a letter from a Cowes resident.

Red Funnel, the Southampton-based ferry company that provides routes from Southampton to both Cowes and East Cowes, has continued to use the name West Cowes for the town in information and publicity and as the name for the town's terminal.

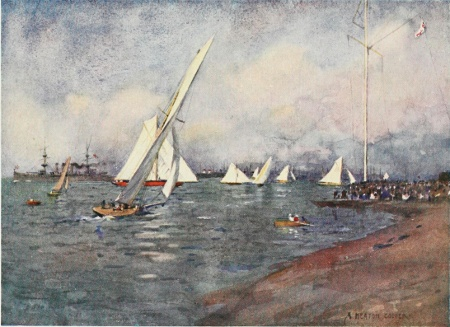
Where the Royal Yacht Squadron have their headquarters, and where the famous "Cowes Week" takes place in August. - From the Beautiful Britain series, The Isle of Wight, by G. E. Mitton.

=== Early history ===
In earlier centuries the two settlements were much smaller and known as East and West Shamblord or Shamelhorde, the East being the more significant settlement.

The Isle of Wight was a target of attempted French invasions, and there were notable incursions. Henrician castles were built in both settlements in the sixteenth century. The west fort in Cowes still survives to this day, albeit without the original Tudor towers, as Cowes Castle. The fort built in East Cowes is believed to have been similar but was abandoned c. 1546 and since destroyed.

The seaport at Cowes was the first stop on English soil before crossing the Atlantic Ocean with many ships loaded with German and Swiss passengers leaving from Rotterdam and going to the New World destination of Philadelphia, Pennsylvania. These passengers were going to become British subjects in Colonial America, and the English captains made a written record of the stop in Cowes.

=== Royal patronage creates a yachting centre ===
It is believed that the building of an 80-ton, 60-man vessel called Rat o' Wight on the banks of the river Medina in 1589 for the use of Queen Elizabeth I sowed the seed for Cowes to grow into a world-renowned centre of boatbuilding. However, seafaring for recreation and sport remained the exception rather than the rule until much later. It was not until the reign of keen sailor George IV that the stage was set for the heyday of Cowes as 'The Yachting Capital of the World.' In 1826 the Royal Yacht Squadron organised a three-day regatta for the first time and the next year the king signified his approval of the event by presenting a cup to mark the occasion. This became known as Cowes Regatta and it soon grew into a four-day event that always ended with a fireworks display.

The opium clippers Nina (1852), Eamont (1853) and Wild Dayrell (1854) were built in Cowes.

=== Great houses ===
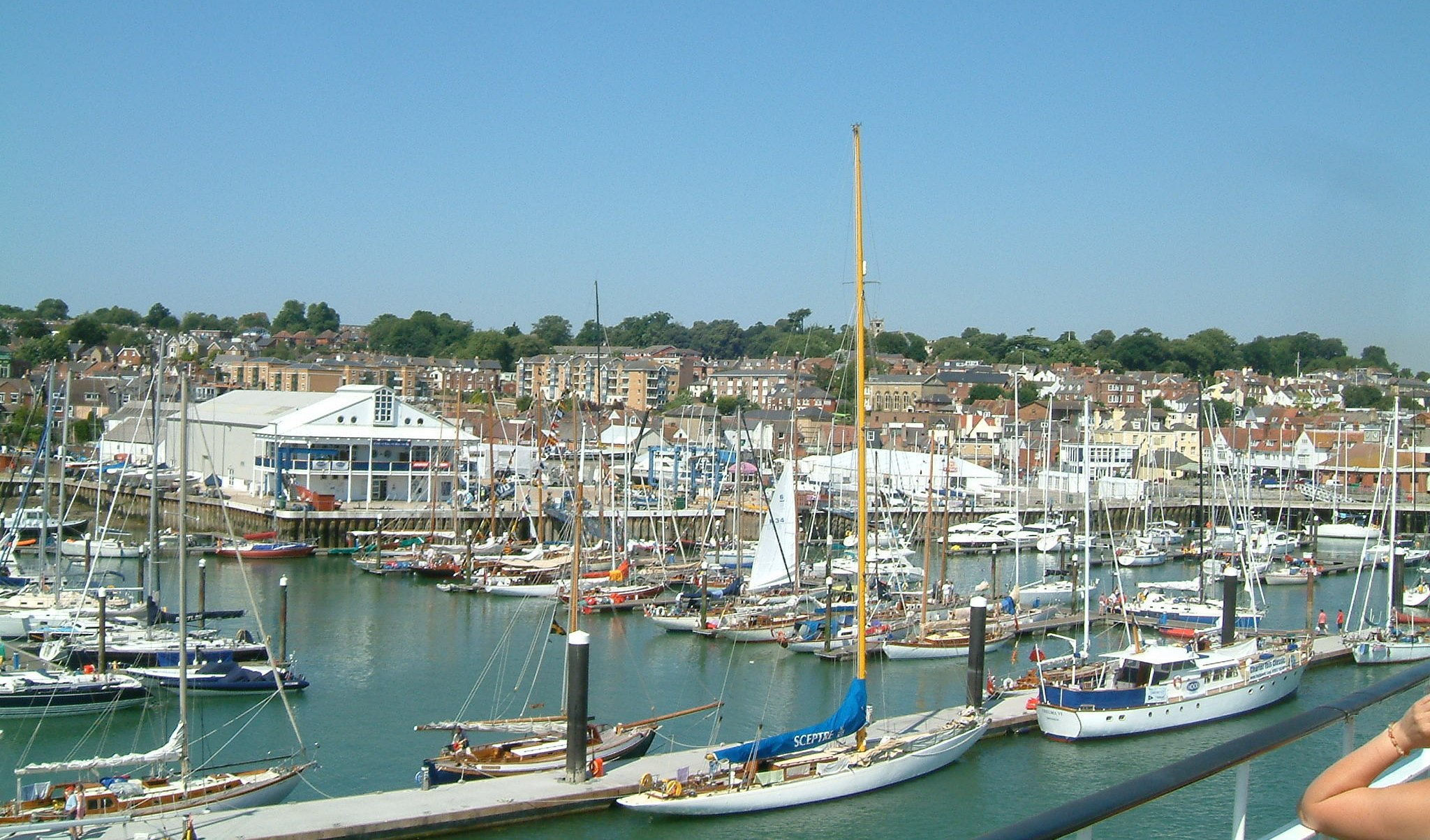
Cowes marina

In Cowes the 18th-century house of Westbourne was home to a collector of customs whose son, born there in 1795, lived to become Dr Thomas Arnold, headmaster of Rugby School.

Northwood House was the home of the Ward family. It was donated under trust to the town in 1929, the grounds becoming Northwood Park. William George Ward was a close friend of the poet Tennyson and in whose memory the poet wrote six lines.

Cowes and East Cowes became a single urban district in 1933.

=== World War II and the Błyskawica ===
During an air raid of World War II on 4/5 May 1942, the local defences had been fortuitously augmented by the Polish destroyer Błyskawica (itself built by J. Samuel White in East Cowes), which put up such a determined defence that, in 2002, the crew's courage was honoured by a local commemoration lasting several days to mark the 60th anniversary of the event. In 2004 an area of Cowes was named Francki Place in honour of the ship's commander. The Friends of the ORP Błyskawica Society is active in Cowes. There is a Błyskawica Memorial.

== Economy ==
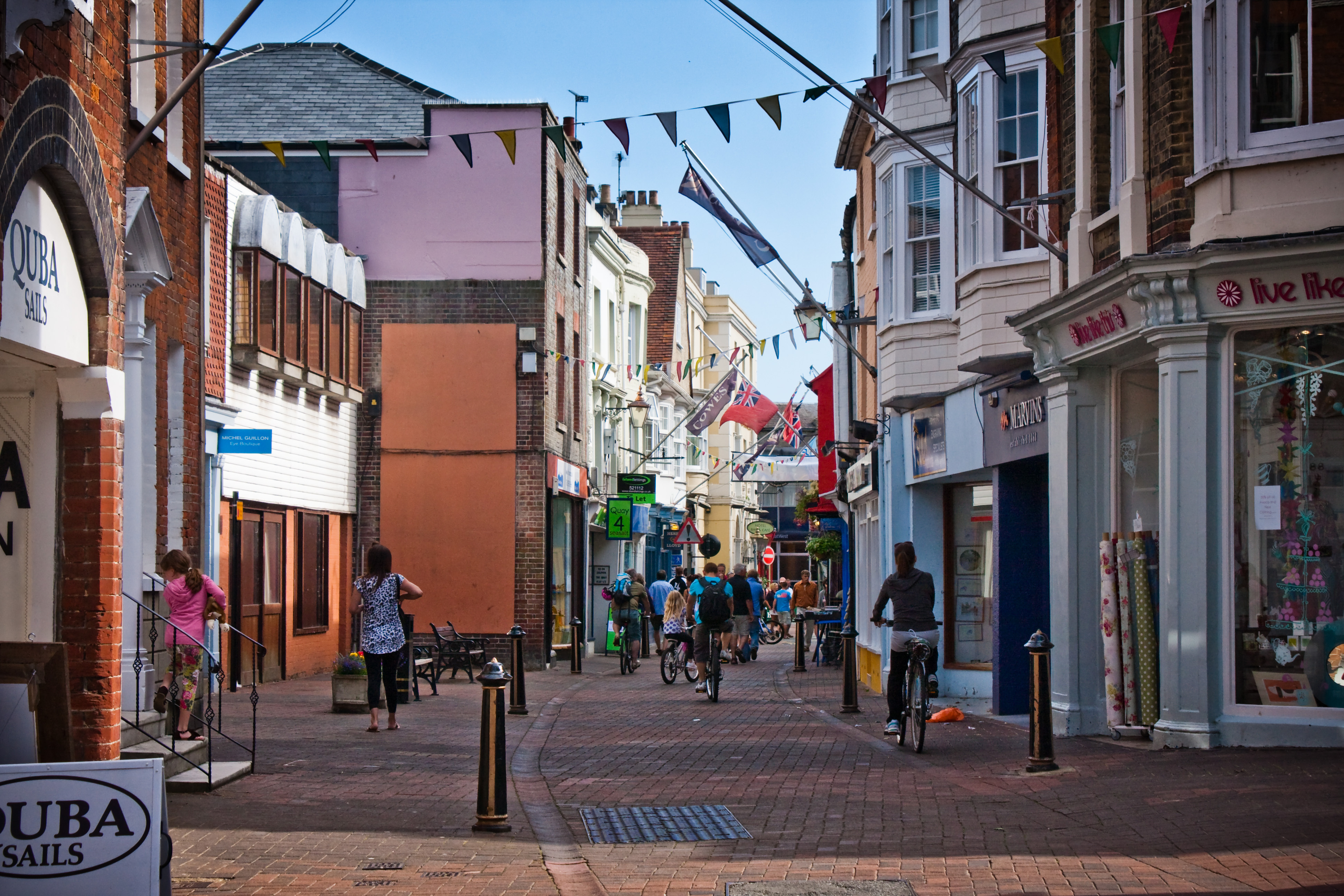
Cowes High Street

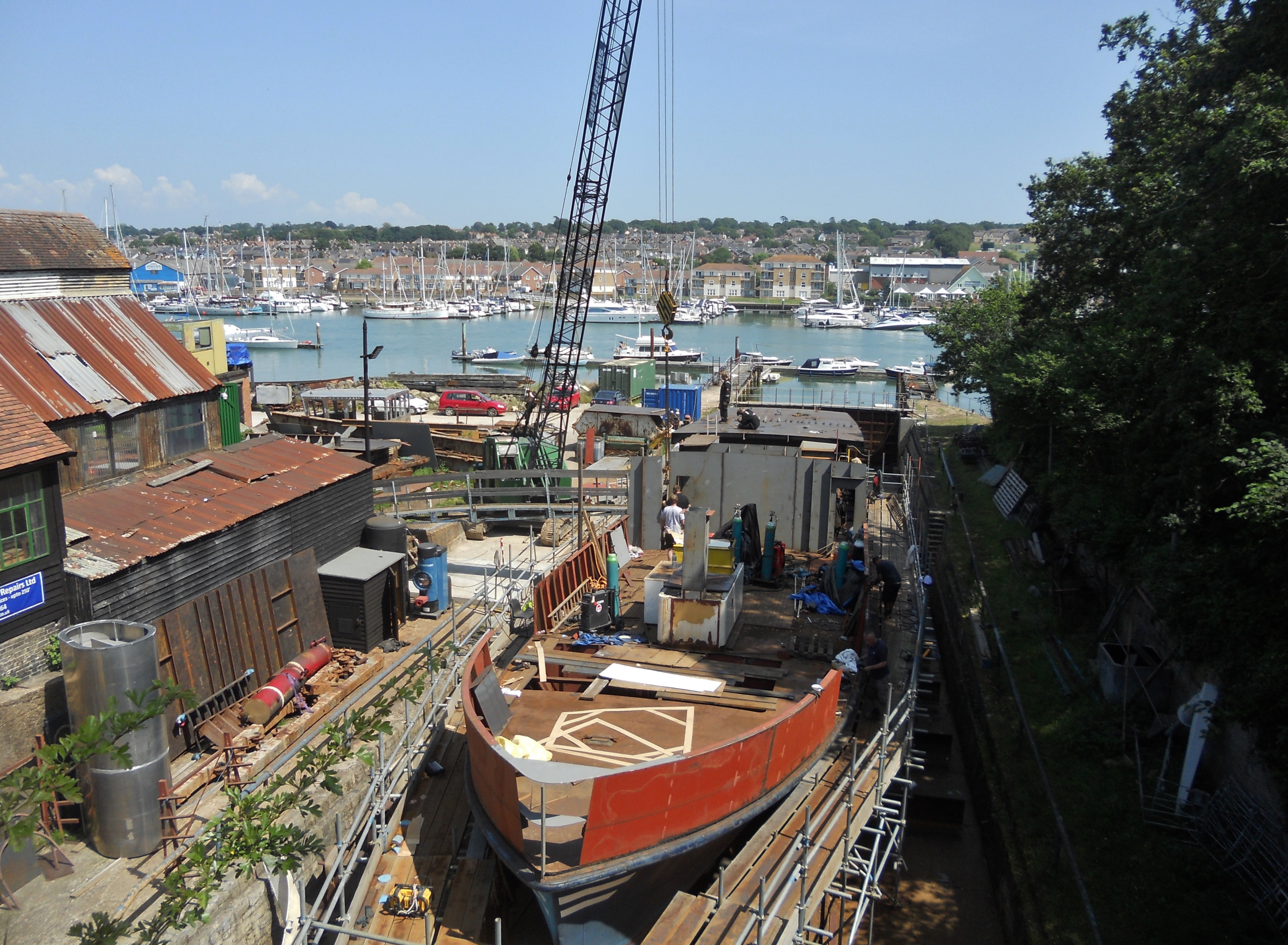
Ship under refurbishment in Arctic Road dry dock

Industry in both Cowes and East Cowes has always centred on the building and design of marine craft and materials associated with boat-making, including the early flying boats, and sail-making. It is the place where the first hovercraft was tested.

Major present-day employers include BAE Systems, which occupies the site of the old Somerton Aerodrome at Newport Road, Cowes; and GKN Aerospace in East Cowes.

The population of the town increases dramatically during Cowes Week, the busiest time of the year for local businesses. The town was reported to be doing well in 2009, despite the economic downturn.

The high street is where most of the retail shops in the town are located. These include specialist sailing shops catering for yachting enthusiasts, a small bookshop, hardware and homeware stores, an indoor plant shop and many more independent shops and businesses. There are a number of cafes and restaurants, including a coffee shop called PO41, despite the post code for Cowes being PO31.

== Sport and leisure ==
Cowes has a Non-League football club Cowes Sports F.C., which plays at Westwood Park. Cowes also has a sailing harbour for sailing and a golf club.

== Media ==
Local news and television programmes are provided by BBC South and ITV Meridian. Television signals are received from the Rowridge TV transmitter.

Local radio stations are BBC Radio Solent on 96.1 FM, Heart South on 97.5 FM, Capital South on 103.2 FM, Easy Radio South Coast on 107.4 FM, Nation Radio South Coast on 106.0 FM, Greatest Hits Radio South on 105.2 FM and Isle of Wright based community stations: Vectis Radio on 104.6 FM and Isle of Wight Radio on 102.0 FM.

The town is served by these local newspapers, Isle of Wight County Press, Isle of Wight Observer and Island Echo.

== Transport ==
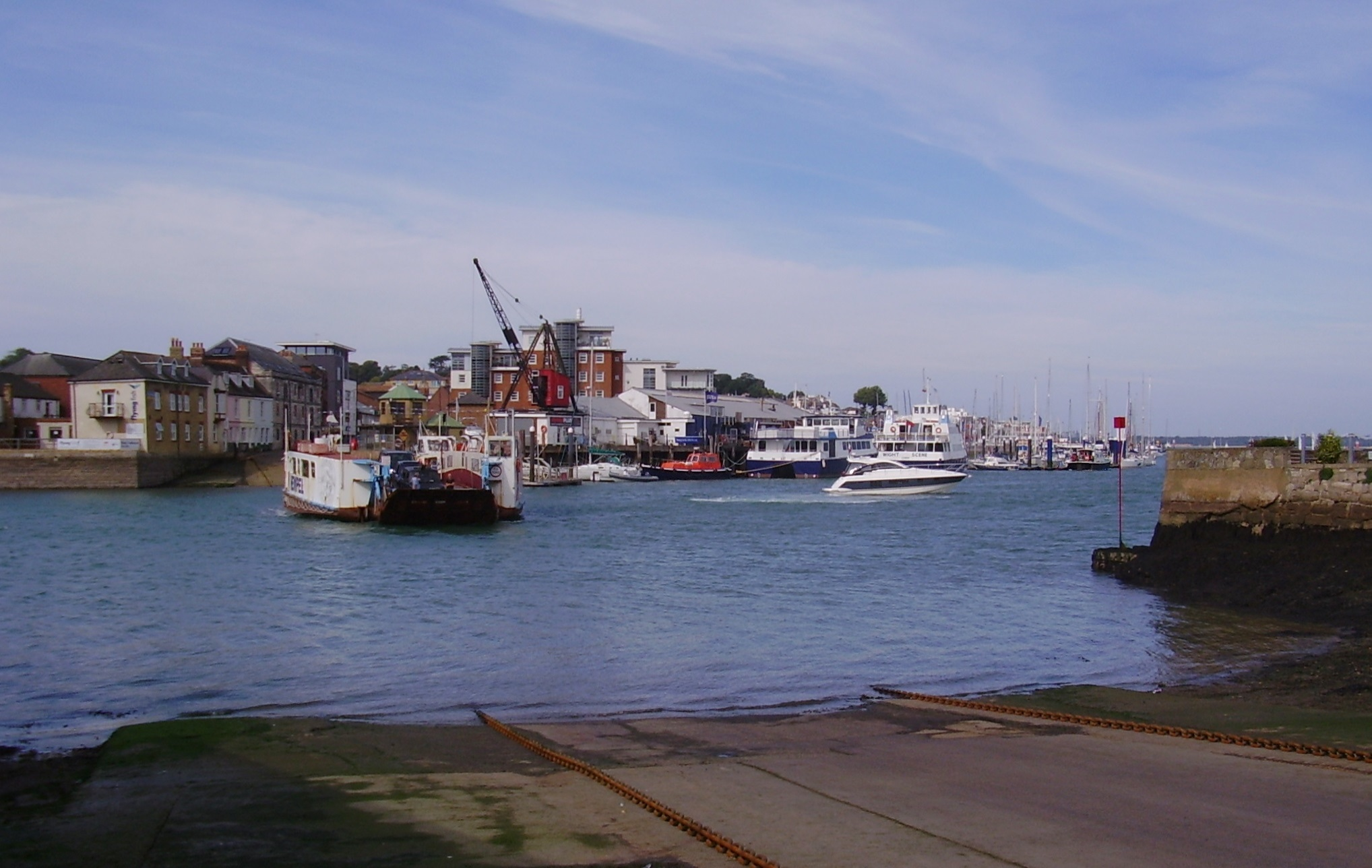
The chain ferry, or "floating bridge", crossing the river; view from East Cowes

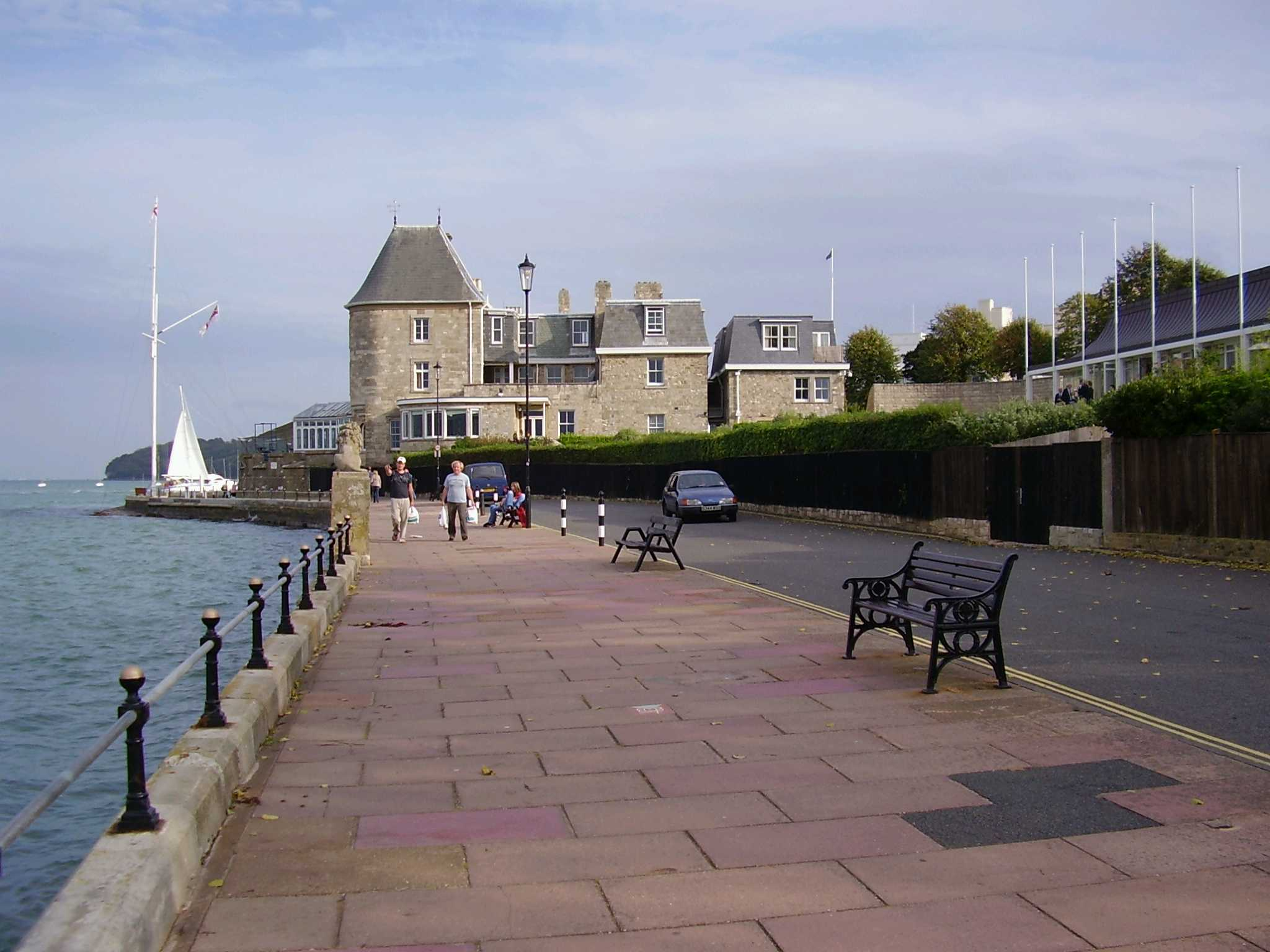
Cowes Esplanade and Cowes Castle (home of the Royal Yacht Squadron)

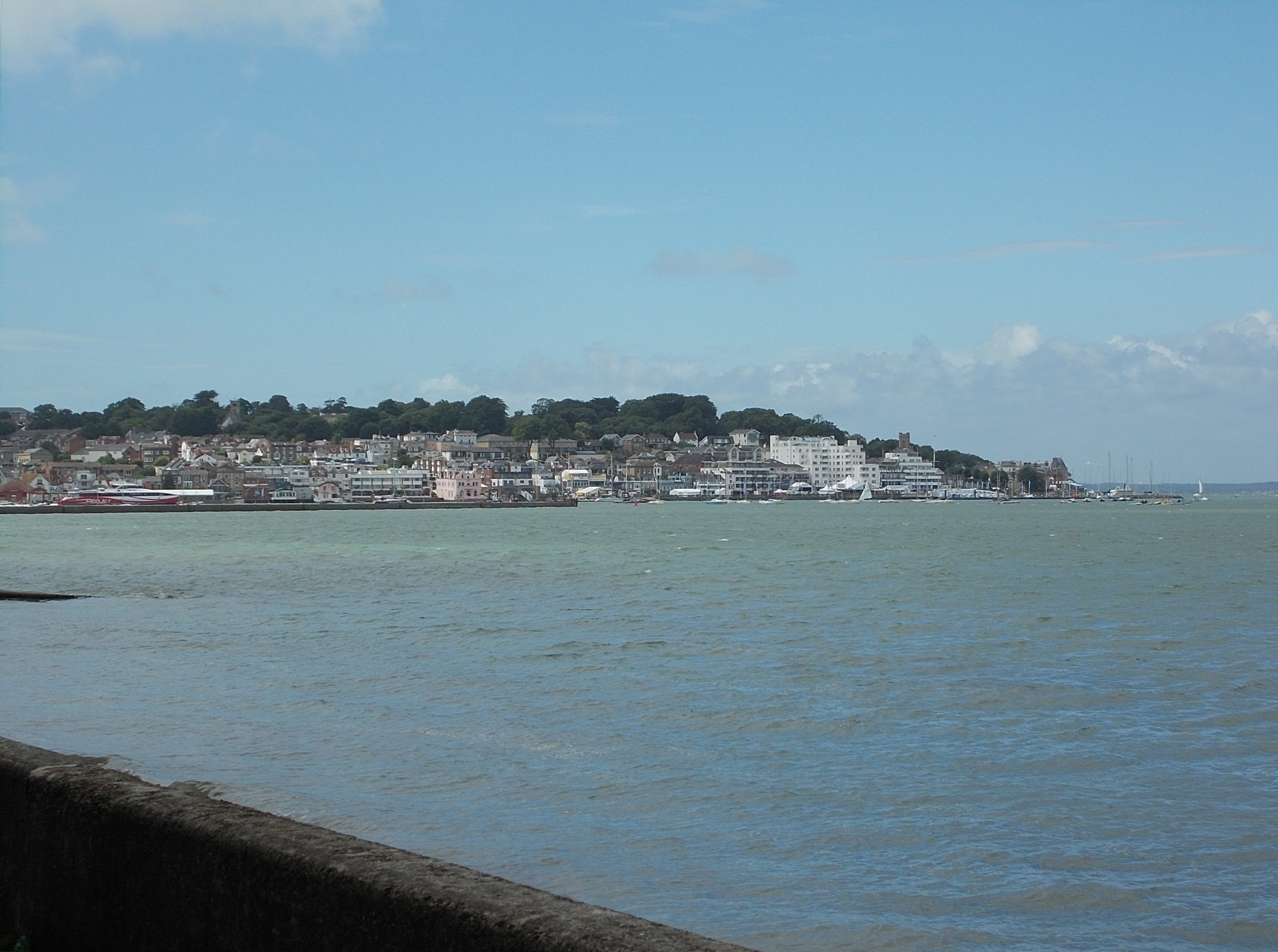
Cowes, viewed from East Cowes

Cowes is a gateway town for the Isle of Wight. Travellers to Southampton are served by a high speed catamaran passenger ferry from Cowes known as the Red Jet. Southern Vectis' route 1 is the main bus service in Cowes. Single decker buses branded Red1 serve the Red Jet terminal, whilst route 1 double deckers serve the M&S Foodhall at Carvel Lane (the site of the former Cowes railway station). Both run to Newport to take travellers on to other island destinations. Wightbus also ran local services around Cowes and Gurnard until 2011. The Cowes Floating Bridge connects the two towns of West Cowes and East Cowes throughout the day. It is one of a few remaining chain ferries not replaced by a physical bridge.

Cowes is the start of the Isle of Wight Coastal Path.

Cowes was once served by a rail link to and from Newport but as part of cutbacks made on the recommendation of Dr Beeching in the 1960s the line to Newport was cut in 1966. The trackbed south of Arctic Road is now maintained as a cycle path.

=== Park and ride ===
Cowes Park and Ride is a park and ride scheme on the Isle of Wight, featuring an 85-space car park and bus stop on the outskirts of Cowes in Somerton. It is currently served by Southern Vectis buses on route 1 every 10 minutes during the day. From the park and ride, a return journey is available to Cowes Pontoon for the Red Jet boat to Southampton. This is one of the few return journeys Southern Vectis offer.

The park and ride scheme for Cowes was launched in 2004 as part of a joint venture between the Isle of Wight Council, Southern Vectis and Red Funnel. It was built on a former council depot on the Somerton Industrial Estate. The scheme went ahead largely due to losing a car park in Denmark Road for development, resulting in a lack of parking around Cowes.

To begin with, the scheme suffered with a huge lack in the number of people using the service, receiving no passengers in its first few days of operation.

Prior to the network revision by Southern Vectis in April 2006, the park and ride was served by routes 1, 2 and 3, with routes 2 and 3 running under the Route Rouge branding.

When the scheme was first launched, the price of a return ticket was £1, however, in April 2008, the price increased for the first time, doubling to £2 by Southern Vectis. This was due to a rise in costs and substantial cut in payments for free travel by the Isle of Wight Council. This later increased again on 2 February 2009 along with other £2 fares to £2.50 as part of Southern Vectis' annual fare review.

The site was remodelled over the turn of 2009 and 2010. A new entrance was built directly off the roundabout, with a new bus stop and shelter, and a raised kerb. The previous entrance and exit was widened as an exit. The rearrangement provides more spaces.

== Notable residents ==
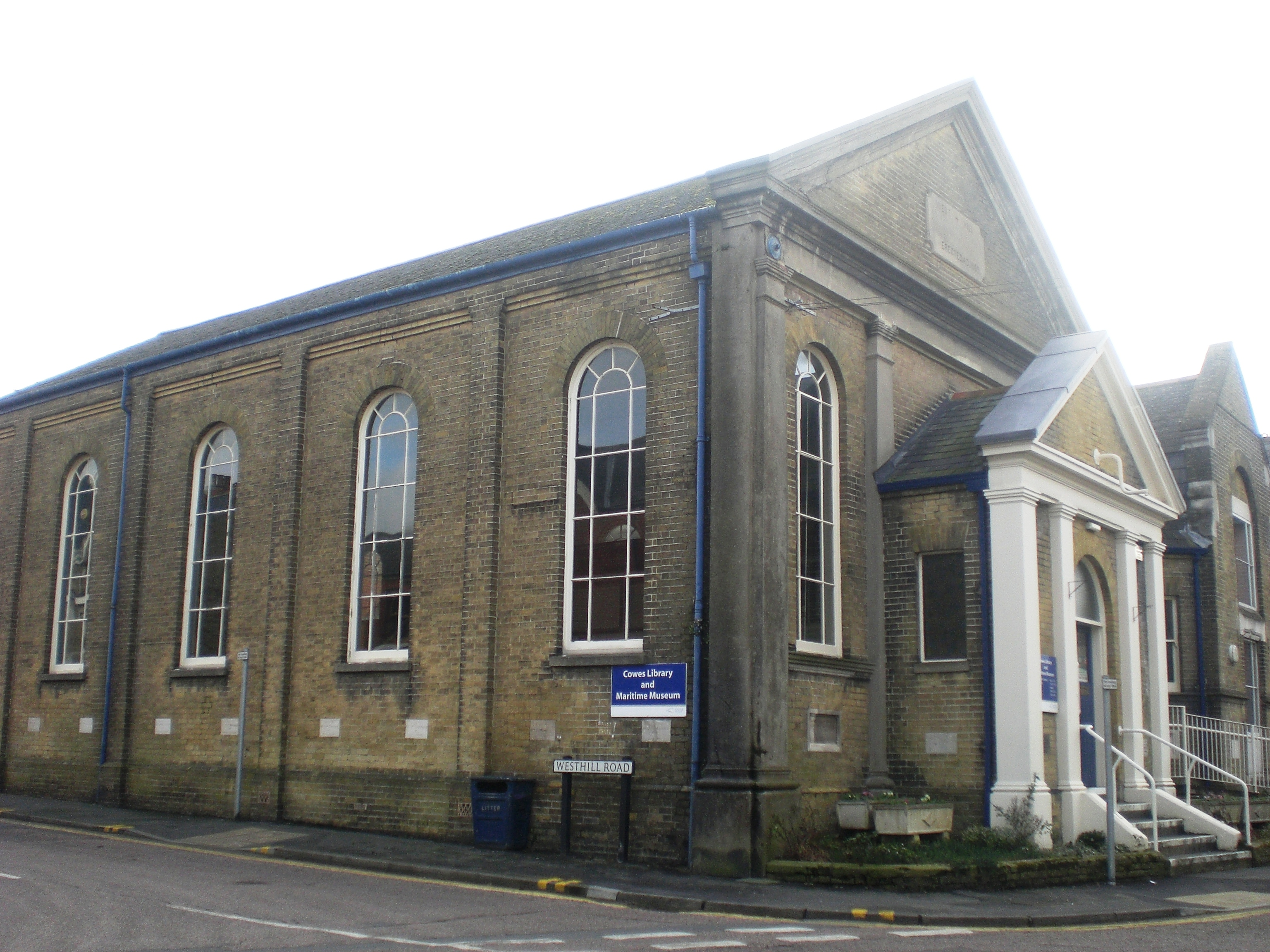
The Cowes Library and Maritime Museum building

See Category:People from Cowes

- Louisa Susannah Aikman — British-American author
- Thomas Arnold — Headmaster of Rugby School
- John Henry Corke — four times Mayor of Portsmouth
- Ena Fitzgerald — writer
- Uffa Fox — naval architect, author, yachtsman
- Celia Imrie — actress
- Jeremy Irons — Academy Award-winning actor
- Kenneth Kendall — journalist and broadcaster
- Albert Ketèlbey — composer, conductor and pianist
- Mark King — bassist and lead singer of Level 42
- Ellen MacArthur — solo long-distance yachtswoman
- Owen Maddock — British engineer, Cooper Car Company, 1950–1963
- Cliff Michelmore — BBC television and radio presenter/producer
- Alwyn Ruddock — English historian who studied 15th century English voyages
- Reginald Sartorius — Victoria Cross recipient
- Clement Smith — Victoria Cross recipient
- David Steele — Bass Guitarist & Songwriter: the Beat and Fine Young Cannibals
- Alan Titchmarsh — gardener, novelist and broadcaster
- Zita of Bourbon-Parma — Empress of Austria-Hungary; educated at nearby convent

== See also ==
- Classic Boat Museum
- Cowes Maritime Museum
- Holy Trinity Church, Cowes
- List of current places of worship on the Isle of Wight
- St. Faith's Church, Cowes
- St. Mary's Church, Cowes

== Sister cities ==
- Bulls, New Zealand
- Deauville, France
