= Eamont (schooner) =

History

United Kingdom
- Name: Eamont
- Owner: Dent & Co
- Builder: White, Cowes
- Launched: 1854

General characteristics
- Tons burthen: 120 (bm
- Length: 87 ft (26.5 m)
- Beam: 20 ft (6.1 m)
- Draught: 12 ft (3.7 m)
- Sail plan: Schooner

Eamont was an opium clipper built in Cowes. It was the subject of books by Captain Lindsay Anderson including A cruise in an opium clipper (1891) and Among typhoons and pirate craft (1892).

Eamont was involved in the opening of Japan to foreigners in 1858, serving as a dispatch boat between Nagasaki and Shanghai, and was one of the first vessels to open up a trade with Formosa.

== Construction ==
White, of Cowes, built both Eamont and Wild Dayrell. Eamont was constructed of teak and mahogany, measured a little over 200 tons and had a mainboom 110 feet long. She was a very powerful vessel and carried 200 tons of iron kentledge fitted into her as a stationary ballast. She was armed with four 18-pounders a side and two pivot guns, like Zephyr, the two vessels belonging to Dent & Co.

== Career ==
During the Taiping Rebellion Eamont ran up to the threatened city of Ningpo, passing right through the Battle of Chinhae, which was being waged not only on the banks but in the river itself. At Ningpo she found Zephyr. The two schooners loaded up with fugitive celestials, and raced each other back to Woosung. But in the smooth sheltered water of the river, and with a fresh whole sail breeze, Zephyr was more than a match for the more strongly built Cowes schooner. However, Eamont had her revenge in weather more to her choice. The two vessels met this time in half a gale of wind with a heavy sea running, and Eamont sailed right dead to windward of Zephyr, and left her out of sight in twelve hours.

Eamont was sent on some very dangerous trips. She was one of the first vessels to open up a trade with Formosa, and made the first survey of the port of Taku, which she entered by bumping over the reef in spite of a tremendous surf beating upon it at the time, a most daring performance. And in her efforts to trade with the Formosans she had to withstand the attack of hundreds of armed natives right on top of a typhoon, which she succeeded in riding out on her moorings. But Eamont's captain was a famous fighting man, as the Chinese pirates knew to their cost. In his constant encounters with piratical lorchas Captain Gulliver made use of a drag sail, with which he would suddenly deaden the way of his schooner, and so out-manoeuvre these "Invincibles," as they called themselves.

Eamont was also employed in the negotiations for the first commercial treaty with Japan. On this occasion she ran into Nagasaki and quietly dropped anchor, in spite of the fact that opposition to the proposed commercial treaty was very strong at the time. On the following morning 150 boat-loads of Japanese attempted to tow her to sea, being evidently ignorant of an anchor's raison d'être. But though they attempted several similar methods to get rid of her they refrained from any armed attack, and, eventually, her mission was completely successful. This was in 1858, and Eamont's crew saw many wonderful sights in that tierra incognita.

== Typhoon of 1858 ==
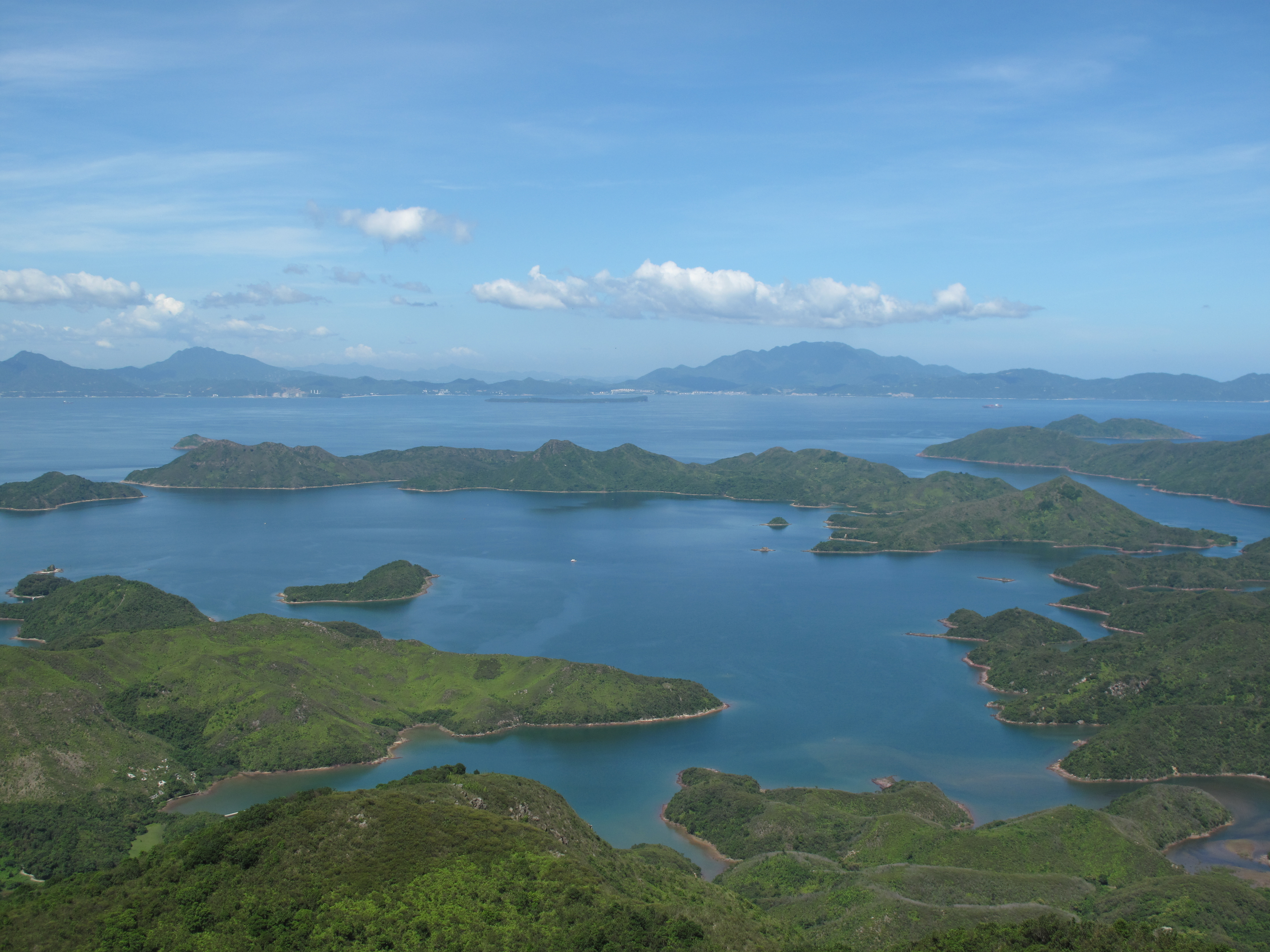
Double Haven, Double Island, in 2011

On 21 September 1858, a typhoon destroyed several well-known opium clippers, including Anonyma, Gazelle, Pantaloon, and Mazeppa. Eamont was anchored off Double Island, with "150 fathoms (900 feet; 270 meters) of chain out and a second anchor backed on it at 60 fathoms (360 feet; 110 meters)]." The waves in the anchorage were estimated to be as large as 40 feet (12 meters), and Eamont’s crew had to cut away her masts. Eamont was one of only two ships in that anchorage to survive the night, the other being Hazard.
