= Ena Fitzgerald =

Ena Fitzgerald MacMillan
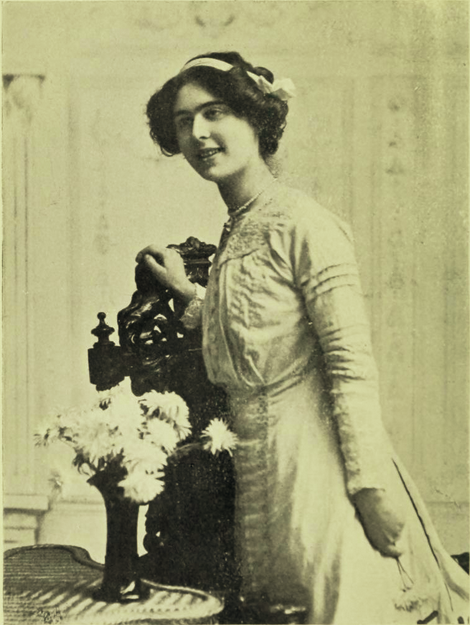
- (1922)
- Born: Georgina Fitzgerald-Galaher; 5 October 1889; Cowes, Isle of Wight, England
- Died: 10 January 1962 (aged 72)
- Occupations: journalist; writer
- Spouse: James Alison Macmillan (m. 1925)
- Relatives: Edward FitzGerald
- Writing career
- Pen name: Ena Fitzgerald
- Period: Edwardian era
- Genres: novels; poems; short stories
- Notable work: Patcola

Ena Fitzgerald was the pen name of Georgina Fitzgerald-Galaher (after marriage, Georgina Fitzgerald MacMillan; 1889–1962), an English journalist and author. She served as the editor of various magazines and was a correspondent for various newspapers. Earlier in life, she wrote novels, poems, and short stories. Her novel, Patcola, received considerable praise as being the first work of a teenager.

== Early life and education ==
Georgina Fitzgerald-Galaher was born on 5 October 1889, near Cowes, Isle of Wight. She was the only child of Rev. George Fitzgerald-Galaher, M.A., litterateur (formerly of Dublin), by his second marriage. Her mother was from Yorkshire. She was a descendant of Edward FitzGerald, the translator of Rubaiyat of Omar Khayyam.

She was educated in the Isle of Wight.

== Career ==
Under the name of "Ena Fitzgerald", she published Patcola : An Indian Romance, written at the age of 17, and published in 1908. This was followed by The Witch Queen of Khem : the Tale of a Wrong made Right (1909), a romance story of Egypt. Both books were well received by very critics in Great Britain, India, Egypt, Australia, and South Africa. And the Stars Fought, an Isle of Wight romance, came out in 1912.

Fitzgerald contributed to children's literature with short stories for In the Lion's Mouth and Where Duty Calls or Danger, which were a series of books for children, edited by Alfred Henry Miles. She contributed the short story, "War Scouots at Tripoli" to With Hunter, Trapper and Scout in Camp and Field, another book in the A. H. Miles series.

Her poems were published in Arnell's Poets of the Wight (1922) and C. F. Forshaw's Pearls of Poesy (1911). She also contributed magazine articles, to the Chicago Tribune (Paris edition), Liverpool Post, Yorkshire Evening Post, Dancing Times, and others.

In 1926–29, Fitzgerald served as the editor of Yorkshire Homes, published by Gordon Chambers, County Homes Journals, Ltd. She was a correspondent for the Drapers' Record and Men's Wear and Yorkshire correspondent to the Dancing Times. Beginning in 1946, she was a correspondent for New Theatre Magazine. Fitzgerald served as honorary secretary of the Yorkshire District Institute of Journalists.

Fitzgerald gave lectures, and was the first woman to be a member of the Isle of Wight Aero Club.

== Personal life ==
In 1911, she was living at Newport, in Shanklin in 1913, and in Wroxall in 1922. Two years later, her address was: Hotel D'Angleterre, 38 Faubourg St Honore, Paris.

In 1925, she married the engineer James Alison Macmillan, F.C.W.A., in Croydon, Surrey.

A widow, Georgina Fitzgerald MacMillan died 10 January 1962.

== Selected works ==
=== Novels ===
- Patcola: A Tale of a Dead City (1908)
- The Witch Queen of Khem: A Tale of a Wrong Made Right, (1909)
- And the Stars Fought: A Romance (1912)

=== Poems ===
- "Questions"
- "Marching Song"
- "The Exile - Serbia's Sorrow"
