= Church of St John the Baptist, Northwood =

Coordinates: 50°44′03″N 01°18′06″W

Church of St. John the Baptist, Northwood
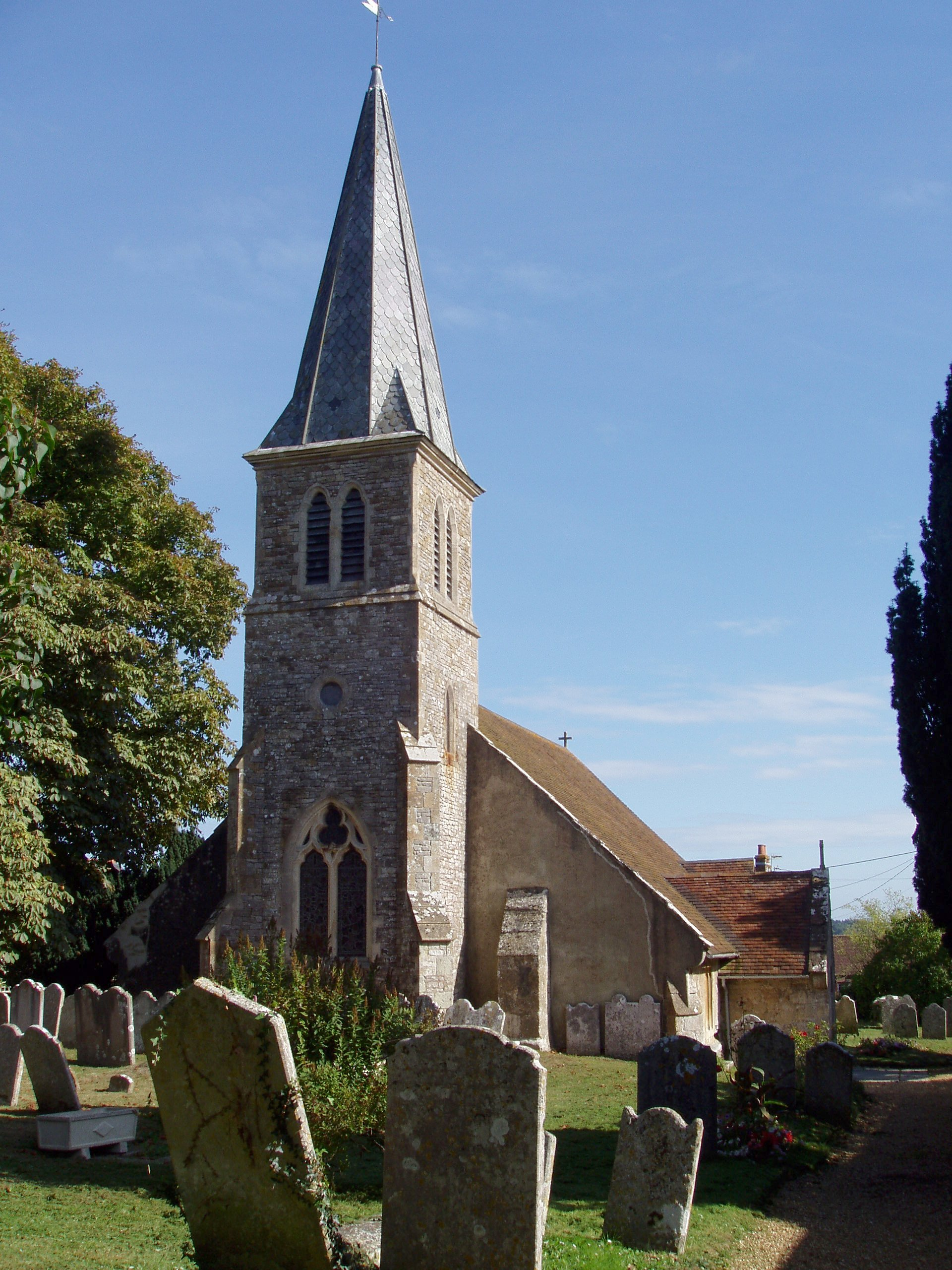
- Church of St. John the Baptist, Northwood
- Denomination: Church of England
- Churchmanship: Broad Church
- Website: www.northwoodvillage.org.uk/church/default.aspx

History
- Dedication: St. John the Baptist

Administration
- Province: Canterbury
- Diocese: Portsmouth
- Parish: Northwood, Isle of Wight

Clergy
- Rector: Revd Dr Ryan Cook

The Church of St. John the Baptist, Northwood is a parish church in the Church of England located in Northwood, Isle of Wight. The church is situated to the east of the main Newport to Cowes road, approximately 400m south of the village in Chawton Lane. It is a Grade I listed building.

== History ==
The church is medieval.

The mid-19th century saw extensive restoration work carried out on the church. In 1864 the wooden tower and dormer window were both swept away. The restoration was completed in 1874. Despite this restoration work, the church still retains many of its original features including a Norman arch over the south doorway and a Jacobean pulpit.

Northwood's only bell was hung in 1875.
