= Northwood House =

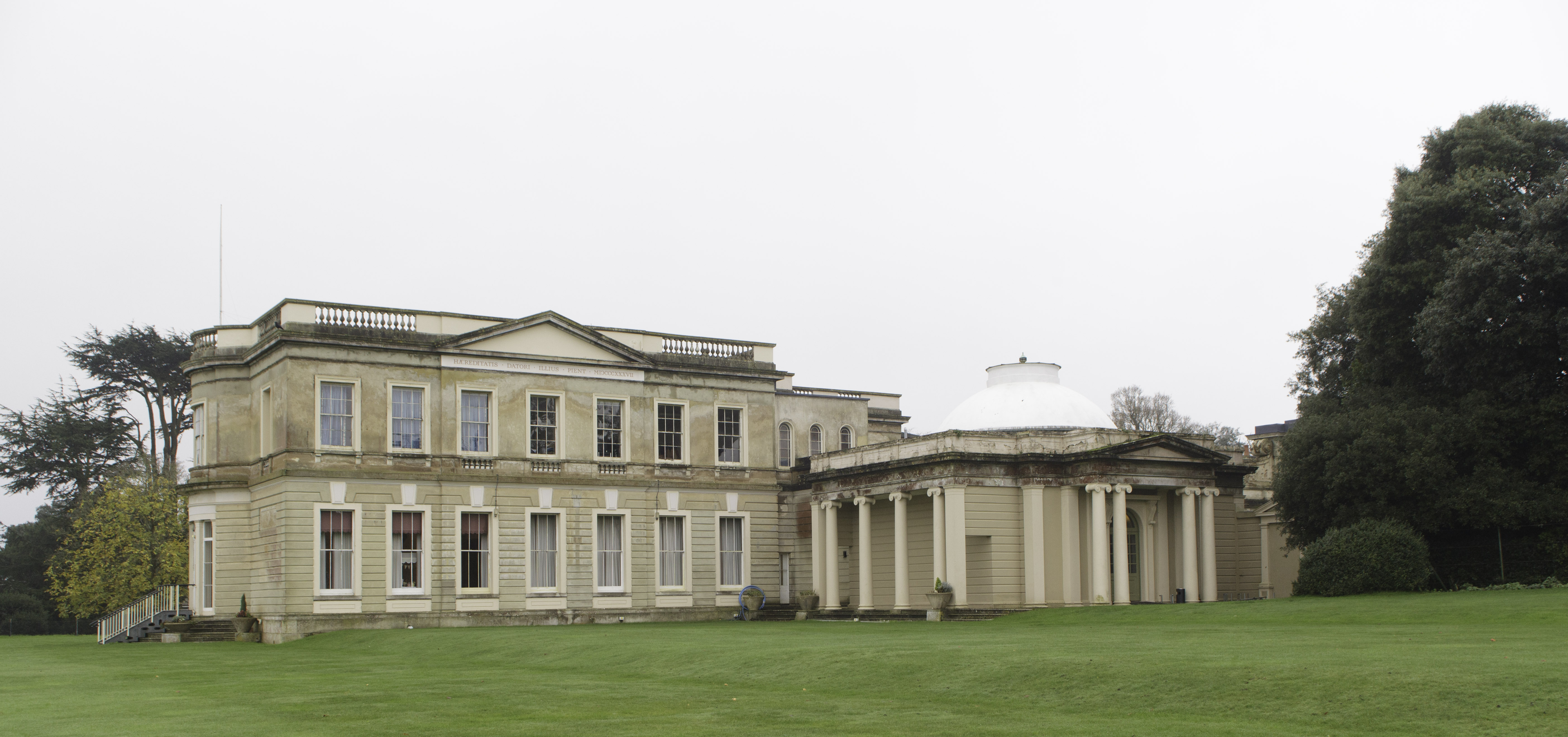
- Northwood House (north facing facade)

- Location within Isle of Wight

General information
- Architectural style: Classical
- Location: Isle of Wight, Cowes, England
- Coordinates: 50.763402°N 1.303200°W
- Completed: 1799
- Client: George Ward

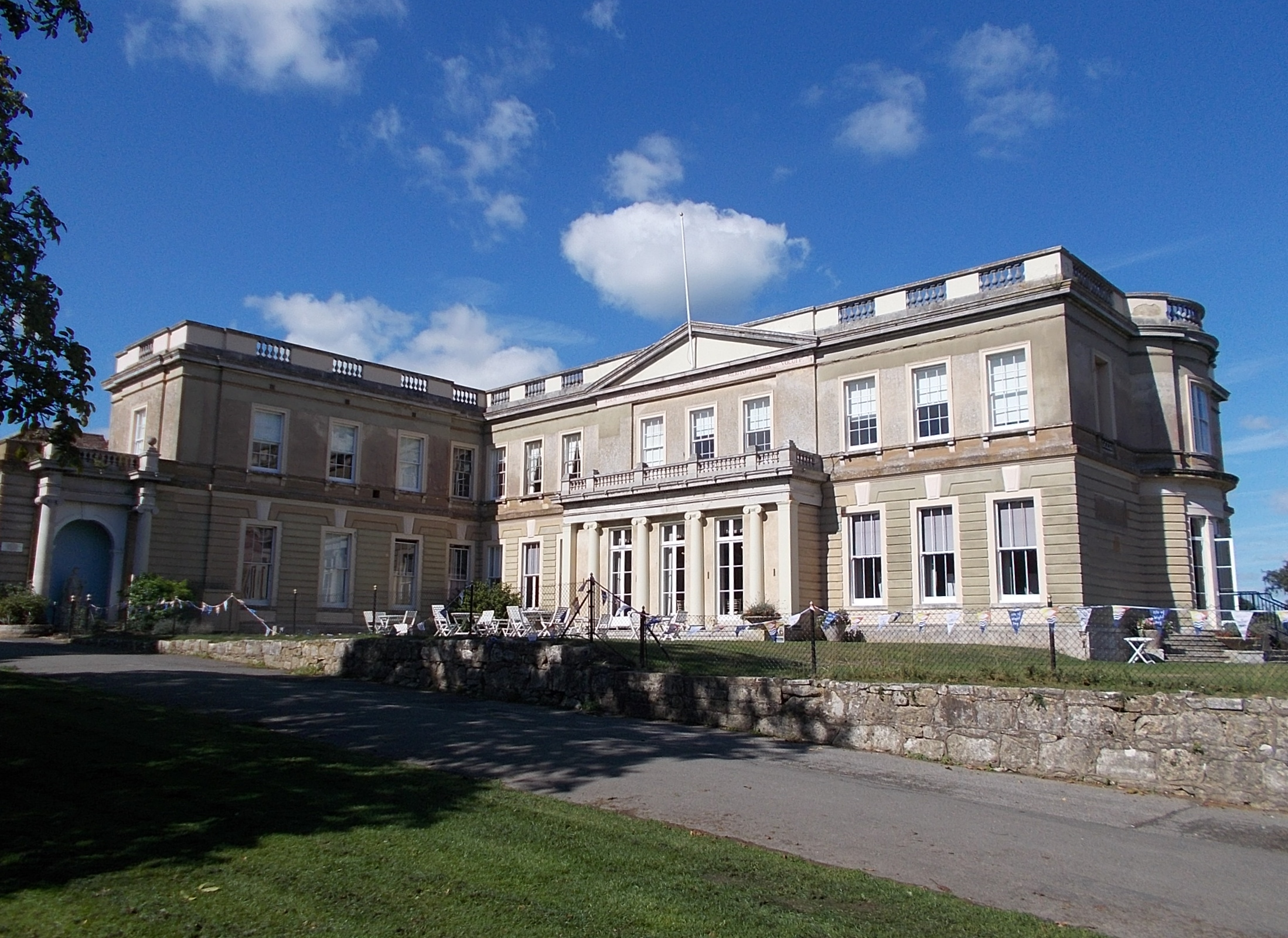
The house viewed from the south east.

Northwood House is a country manor house in Cowes on the Isle of Wight in the United Kingdom. The current building dates back to 1799 and was built for the London businessman George Ward, remaining in his family for five generations. It is a Grade II listed building, said to have a ground floor area of around 15,000 square feet.

In 1929, Northwood House and its 26-acre "pleasure park", known as Northwood Park, were gifted by the Wards to Cowes Urban District Council. The gift was conditional upon the house being used as municipal offices and the grounds 'as pleasure gardens for the people of Cowes'.

In 2010, after 81 years of operating as council offices, the council withdrew and handed the house and estate over to a charitable trust to administer. Today this Georgian manor house is looked after and run by the Northwood House Charitable Trust Co. Ltd. Their aim is to preserve the building and its grounds for the enjoyment of future generations. Its grounds are open to the public and its buildings are available to hire or to let by the general public as an events centre. This is typically for weddings, parties and conferences.

== Current usage ==
There are currently seven main rooms in the house which are available for hire for events, conferences and special occasions. These are the ball room, the dining room, the drawing room, the morning room, the library, the rotunda and the house bar. Wedding ceremonies can be held in the first six of these rooms, with the ball room being able to seat 120 people.

There are other smaller rooms available in the house to hire or to let for longer periods. There is also a converted stable block in the grounds, which is now known as The Community Hall. As well as being available for private functions, the 26-acre estate also hosts a number of public events each year and still has its original tennis courts and bowling green.

The original icehouse still remains, half buried in the grounds of Northwood House. There are thought to be about fifteen icehouses remaining on the Isle of Wight. There is also a war memorial in the grounds, dedicated to those who lost their lives in the First World War. It was originally located at the junction of the High Street and Market Hill, but was itself damaged in an air raid during the Second World War. The remains were relocated to Northwood Park and it now stands as a memorial to both wars.

Surrounding the original entrance-way into the house, the tarmac area has now been converted into a pay short-stay car park, for public use.

== History ==
The Ward family held the estate through six generations from 1793 until 1929. The road which runs in front of the house is named Ward Avenue in their honour. However, they also owned a huge amount of land across the Isle of Wight and also resided at Weston Manor in Freshwater. The successive owners of the estate are as follows:

=== The Ward family ===
==== George Ward (1793–1829) ====
In 1793, George Ward esq, a highly successful merchant banker from Broad Street in the city of London, bought at auction the Cowes estate of Bellevue, which consisted of Belle Vue House and seventeen acres of land. The house was described as a 'modern brick dwelling house', with four rooms on each floor and an excellent wine cellar.

In 1799, he largely demolished Belle Vue House and built Northwood House on its site, with the grounds being renamed to Northwood Park. The only part of Belle Vue which still exists are the large cellars underneath Northwood House, said to have been originally built to hide smuggled goods. By this time, Ward had also acquired more land in Cowes, including Debourne Farm, bringing the estate up to 217 acres. The driveway, leading up to the house, was by that time almost a mile long. The changes to the house were designed by John Nash, the famous London architect. Nash also designed Buckingham Palace as well as many other island properties, including East Cowes Castle, the IW County Club and St Mildred's Church, Whippingham.

The walls surrounding the estate were built from Bembridge limestone, taken from Brading Harbour.

Ward's wealth originated from his Grandfather, John Ward and his father, who was also called John Ward. Both of whom were highly successful businessmen. However, aside from this, in 1783, his father also won a half-share of a £20,000 state-run lottery win. This is worth over a million pounds today. George Ward was also the older brother of Robert Plumer Ward, the barrister, politician and novelist who was MP for Cockermouth between 1802 and 1806.

Amongst other things, George Ward made his own fortune by lending money to the government during the Napoleonic Wars at highly beneficial rates of interest. He used his money to buy more and more land on the Isle of Wight, eventually amassing around 20,000 acres, said to be one fifth of the island's area. Due to the enormous amounts of land that he owned by this time, his nickname was 'King Ward'. Ward was also a director of the East India Docks in London.

In 1798, George Ward was nominated as a new sheriff in the Court of Exchequer

In 1803, his wife Mary had a baby daughter, born at the house. However, in 1813, she died of a paralytic stroke.

In 1813, George Ward started the first paddle steamer service between Cowes and Southampton. The Isle of Wight Royal Mail Steam Packet Company would eventually become the company now known as Red Funnel.

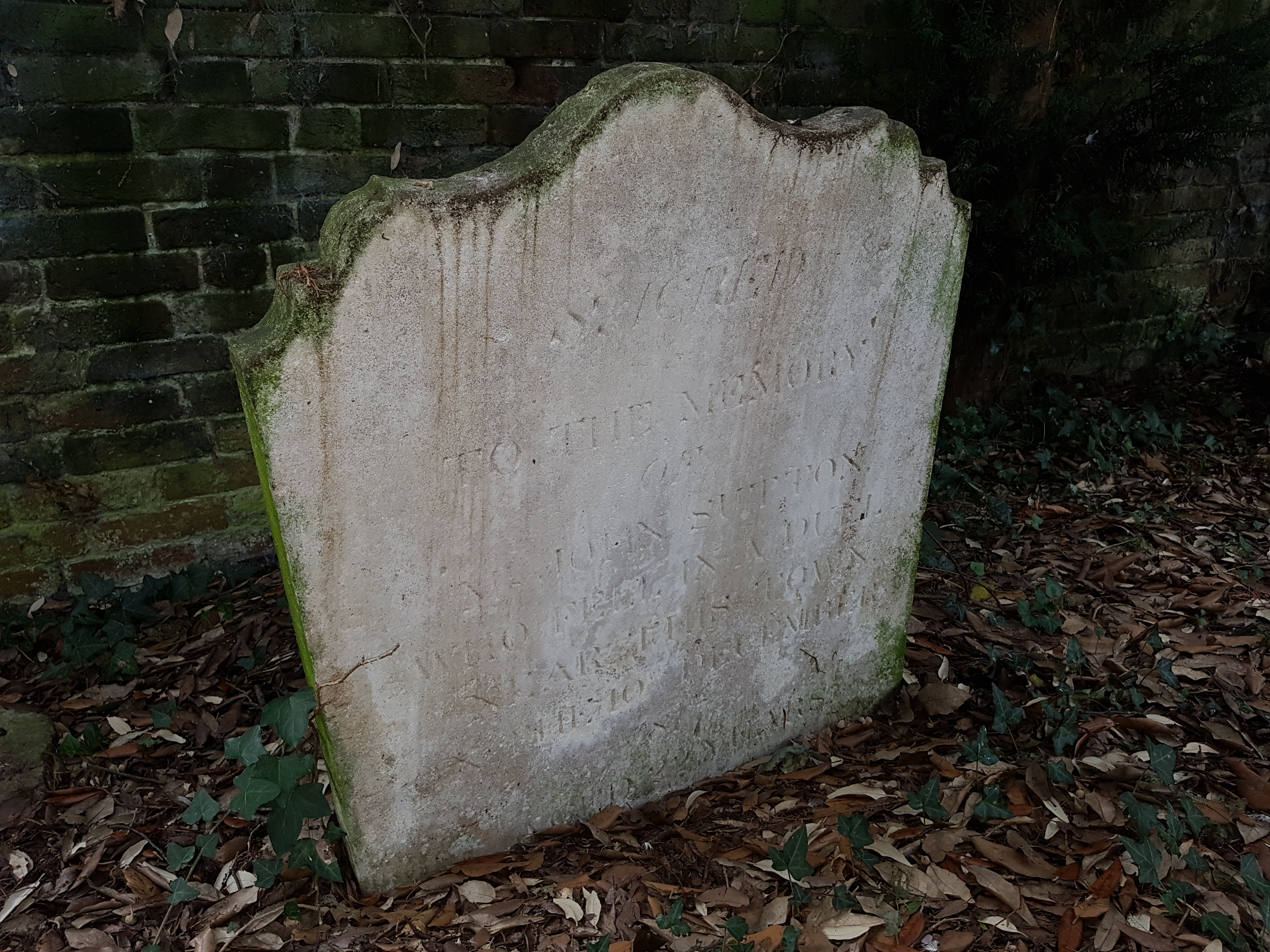
'To the memory of John Sutton, who fell in a duel near this town on 10 December 1817 aged 22 years.'

In 1817, a duel took place at Northwood House between Major Orlando Lockyer and Lieutenant John Sutton, after Lockyer took offense to a comment made by Sutton, whilst both were drinking one night. In the morning, at the agreed duelling place, it was said that Sutton apologised and informed Lockyer that he would not return fire against him. Lockyer still asked for the signal to fire and when the handkerchief was dropped, shot Sutton through the heart without Sutton even unstopping his pistol. Before dying, Sutton staggered forward and held out his hand, which Lockyer took. Lockyer and his seconds then fled the scene. At the Coroner's inquest, the jury returned a verdict of 'Wilful Murder' against Lockyer and his two seconds, who at that time had still not been apprehended. In their subsequent trial at the Winchester Assizes, they were charged with murder. Lockyer said that he had been under the most gross provocation and that he had asked for Sutton to make a concession which would make the duel unnecessary, but that Sutton refused and was obstinate to the last. The defendants were found guilty of manslaughter and given three months' imprisonment each. John Sutton is buried in the next door St Mary's Church graveyard.

In 1821, to celebrate the coronation of George IV, a grand celebration for the poor people of Northwood and Cowes was held at Northwood House. A feast for 2,000 people was prepared and it was seen as an opportunity for them to testify their loyalty and joy to the new king. As well as giving use of his estate, Ward donated 50 guineas towards the total cost of 200 guineas, for the food and the entertainment.

In 1823, Ward was commended for his 'munificent' generosity in distributing six bullocks and ten chaldrons of coals amongst the 'poor and deserving objects' of Cowes.

George had a famous and talented son, the cricketer William Ward. Following in the family footsteps, William was also a noted financier. But as a cricketer, he scored the first-ever first-class double-century and his score of 278 for the MCC v Norfolk in 1820, remained the highest ever first-class score for 56 years, until it was finally beaten by W. G. Grace in 1876, with a score of 344. The ball that Ward played with is held in the MCC Museum and is thought to be the oldest in existence.

William Ward can also be thanked for saving the famous Lord's cricket ground from being sold to a housing developer in 1825. He stepped in and bought the lease, to prevent this from happening. In 1817, William was elected as a director of the Bank of England and was an expert on foreign exchanges. In 1826, William Ward became MP for the City of London. William Ward missed out on inheriting the estate by just three months, dying just before his older brother, George Henry Ward. However, his son inherited the estate in his place.

George Ward died at the age of 78 in 1829, leaving an estate said to be worth upwards of £700,000 at the time.

==== George Henry Ward (1829–1849) ====
In 1829, following the death of George Ward, his first-born son George Henry Ward inherited the estate. In 1837, he vastly renovated the house, incorporating a new western wing, entrance pavilion and classical side wall. As well as inheriting the estate, he also inherited his father's nickname, 'King Ward'.

In 1835, Ward contested the election for member of parliament of the Isle of Wight, but was ultimately defeated by Sir Richard Simeon, both being important Isle of Wight land-owners. Sir Richard Simeon had directed his tenants to vote for whoever they liked. However, it was said that you couldn't find one person on George Ward's estate that would dare to vote against him. It was a very acrimonious campaign, with some violent outbreaks. During the official nomination, events got very heated and another fight broke out. One elector asked Ward if it was true that he had promised a local family that he would arrange for the release from prison of several members of their family in return for them voting for him. Ward replied by saying that he wouldn't answer that question.

Ward was described as a man of 'retired habits who seldom took part in the affairs of Cowes'. He was in fact also a County Magistrate, although he refused to act in that capacity.

In 1845, Northwood House received a visit by Prince Albert and Sir Edward Bowater, who spent two hours viewing the house and its grounds. G H Ward had recently spent £20,000 on 'embellishments by foreign artists' and had spared no expense in laying out the grounds. It was considered that they contained the finest collection of evergreens in England. In 1846, he entertained Sir George Hamilton Seymour, the Minister at Brussels. Sir George was the son of Lord George Seymour, who owned the nearby Norris Castle.

George Henry Ward married Mary Saunders, daughter of Mr Richard Saunders esq. However, she died in 1938, having had no children, leaving George Henry Ward with no immediate heir. The next in line to the estate was William George Ward, the son of George Henry Ward's younger brother, the famous cricketer, William Ward. William Ward only just missed out on inheriting the estate himself, as he died on 30 June 1849, just three months before his older brother George Henry Ward, who died on 29 September 1849. This did not prevent his son from inheriting the estate, as still the next in line.

==== William George Ward (1849–1882) ====
Following his uncle's death, the estate passed to William George Ward, a theologian and mathematician. In 1834 he was awarded an open fellowship at Balliol College, Oxford, for his work in mathematics. He also published many articles on ethics, religion and moral philosophy, having converted from the Church of England to the Roman Catholic Church in 1845.

In 1851, he became a professor of moral philosophy at St Edmund's College, Ware and in 1863 he became editor of the Dublin Review, a Catholic Periodical.

In 1852, it was reported that Northwood House had been leased for a period of ten years, to be used as a Catholic seminary. However, by 1853, it was written that the house was occupied by Robert White Esq, as an educational establishment. Later, by 1858, the house was again occupied by its rightful owner, William George Ward.

In 1858, William ward gave part of the grounds to the people of Cowes, to be used as public walks and a playground. It was proposed that the lower part be used for walks and the upper part as a cricket ground. His father had of course been an eminent first-class cricketer. In 1858, Ward was visited by Cardinal Wiseman.

By 1864, the House was occupied by a Mr Stephenson, but this must have been for a relatively brief period. By 1867, it was occupied by a James Dunkin Lee, after laying vacant for a long time.

In 1871, Ward moved the family seat to Totland, building Weston Manor and Headon Hall, at Alum Bay. His nickname was 'Ideal' Ward.

==== Edmund Granville Ward (1882–1915) ====
Following his father's death, the estate passed to his eldest son, Edmund Granville Ward. He went on to marry Gertrude Jane Mary Dormer, daughter of Hon. Hubert Francis Dormer on 28 May 1885. However, the marriage was annulled in 1896. He died on 2 September 1915. However, Edmund's family home was Egypt House, Egypt Hill, Cowes and so the house lay empty for some years.

However, shortly after acquiring it, Edmund did allow the house to be used by the Royal Yacht Squadron in 1882 to hold a grand ball in honour of HRH Prince of Wales, who had recently been appointed commodore of the squadron. In attendance were his wife, the Princess of Wales and many of the noblemen of the day. The guest list included Marquis, Viscounts, Earls, Lords, Counts, Knights, many men of military rank and their partners. Entertainment was provided by The Hungarian Band and all the men attending had to wear man-of-war jackets of blue cloth with brass buttons, blue trousers, white waistcoats with a black tie. This uniform was said to be a revival of an even older fashion, which was said to be 'very becoming for men who are not too square built'.

In 1884, Northwood House was used by Lord Petre to accommodate the forty to fifty boys of his Woburn school, after his school in Weybridge was sold. Shortly afterwards in 1885, a football match was held at Northwood House, between the boys of Woburn House and Cowes Football Club, which resulted in a 1–1 draw. Not long after this, the school failed, like his Weybridge school before it.

In 1886, the Royal Yacht Squadron again held their annual ball at Northwood House, with The Hungarian Band again supplying the music. It was a truly royal event. Amongst the attendees were the Prince and Princess of Wales, the Crown Prince and Princess of Germany, Princesses Victoria, Margaret and Sophia of Germany, the Duchess of Edinburgh, Princess Louise, Princess Henry of Battenberg, Prince Albert Victor, Prince George, the Princesses Louise, Victoria and Maud of Wales, Princess Irene of Hesse and the Maharaja of Cooch Behar.

In 1889, the Isle of Wight County Council sold off its remaining Toll Houses. The Northwood House Toll House was sold for £30 to the West Council Local Board. Granville Ward also generously gave all of the tenants of his Ward Estate, a rent reduction of 15%.

In August 1889, a grand Garden Party was held at Northwood House, which was again attended by the Prince and Princess of Wales and the Princesses Victoria and Maud. It was held to raise money for the organ and vestry fund of the Cowes Holy Trinity Church. Other attendees included Princess Louise, the Marquis of Lorne, Prince Hermann of Saxe-Weimar and his wife and many Lords and Ladies of their day. Music was provided by the band of the Oxfordshire Light Infantry. Lord Colville's black poodle received much praise for collecting money for the appeal, by wandering appealingly amongst the guests with a money-box around its neck. Regretfully the party was abruptly curtailed when a deluge of rain spoiled the proceedings.

In 1891, Northwood House was placed at the disposal of Prince Henry of Battenberg and his wife Beatrice, daughter of Queen Victoria. They held a grand ball there, attended by several members of the royal family and 300 notable inhabitants of the Isle of Wight. Amongst those present were the Duke and Duchess of Connaught and the Duke of Clarence, once rumoured to be a candidate for being Jack the Ripper. Others included the Marquis of Lorne, Count Mensdorff and Lord and Lady Tennyson. The event was described as the most brilliant gathering that has ever taken place on the island. The purpose for the event was to celebrate Prince Henry being named Governor of the Isle of Wight and keeper of Carisbrooke Castle, in succession to the late Viscount Eversley. Although she did not attend the event, Queen Victoria visited the house beforehand to witness the preparations. The event was to be held at Osborne House, but for the fact that the new banqueting hall had not been completed there.

But, between 1901 and 1906, Northwood House became a convent for 80 Benedictine nuns, who were expelled from France when a new law was passed. The law enabled the French government to close any religious establishments which were Jesuit, Dominican or Benedictine. Among many internal alterations, the ballroom was turned into a chapel, being the largest room in the building. Their life at Northwood was very insular and they were said to never leave its grounds, except in the case of utmost necessity.

One of the nuns was Princess Adelaide of Löwenstein-Wertheim-Rosenberg, widow of the Duke of Braganza, who died in 1866. It was the generosity of the Princess that allowed the nuns to settle in their former home in Solesmes, France. Around the same time in 1901, Benedictine monks also settled in to Appuldurcombe House on the Isle of Wight, before eventually moving to Quarr Abbey where they still reside today.

The nuns at Northwood House were visited in 1902 by the new King and Queen, whilst touring the Isle of Wight. They visited the new convent there and its chapel. In 1905, the nuns were visited by more royalty, entertaining the Queen of Saxony. Then in 1906, Princess Ena who was soon to be married to the King of Spain, was a regular visitor, attending mass with the nuns.

In 1906, the nuns secured a college in Ryde as their permanent home and left Northwood House. Later, in 1909, Northwood Park was turned into a nine-hole golf course.

==== Wilfrid Philip Ward (1915–1916) ====
Lacking an heir, the estate then briefly passed to Edmund's younger brother, Wilfrid Philip Ward, an essayist and biographer. At the time, he was a lecturer at Lowell Institute, Boston and like his father, he also became editor of the Dublin Review. He also wrote at least four biographies, including that of his father, Cardinal Wiseman, Aubrey Thomas de Vere and Cardinal Newman. He was also one of the founders of the 'Synthetic Society', a Knowledge community that was formed from a lunchtime discussion that he had with the former prime minister Arthur Balfour in 1896. The community discussed issues such as agnostic tendencies and religious belief. Ward was described as being one of "the two leading lay English Catholic thinkers of their generation" and was a prominent member of the Oxford Movement.

Wilfrid Ward was married to Josephine Mary Hope-Scott, daughter of James Hope-Scott and Lady Victoria Howard, daughter of the Duke of Norfolk. Living at Weston Manor, Totland, he was said to be a neighbour and intimate friend of Lord Tennyson. He died in 1916, leaving an estate valued at £10,658.

During the First World War, Northwood House was requisitioned by the War Office and it was used as a Red Cross military hospital. In 1915, Princess Louis of Battenberg and her daughter Princess Louise, later to become Queen of Sweden, visited the Red Cross Hospital to visit the sick and wounded soldiers there. Later that same year, the soldiers were visited by Princess Henry of Battenberg and Princess Louise, Duchess of Argyll. Between 1914 and 1919, when the hospital closed, it had treated 1894 patients.

==== Captain Herbert Joseph Ward (1916–1929) ====
Following his father's death, the estate passed to Captain Herbert Joseph Ward, who like many of his predecessors, preferred to live elsewhere. Captain Ward lived at Egypt House, Cowes; and so since the closure of the Red Cross Hospital in 1919, Northwood House had been unoccupied. In 1919, Ward started to sell off much of the family lands and in 1929, he made the decision to give the house and its remaining 29 acres of land to the people of Cowes, to be managed by the Cowes Urban District Council. The house was to be used as municipal offices and the land to be converted into pleasure parks for the people of Cowes.

Captain Ward died in 1967.

=== The Isle of Wight Council years (1929–2010) ===
In 1929, Captain Herbert Joseph Ward, a JP and chairman of the council, gifted the house and estate to Cowes Urban District Council. The deeds to the property were received by HRH Princess Beatrice on 4 September 1929 in her capacity as Royal Governor of the Isle of Wight. She in turn, handed them to Mr F. W. Beken, chairman of Cowes Urban District Council. The following year, tennis courts were built for public use.

During the Second World War the house was also used as a Red Cross first-aid station and as a base for air raid precaution wardens. Parts of the ground were used for growing vegetables under the war effort's 'Dig For Victory' campaign, and there was also an air-raid shelter on the site. There are reports that a bomb fell on the tennis courts. In 1940, a charity event was held at Northwood House, to raise money for the Spitfire Fund. A captured Messerschmitt was put on display for the event. Later in 1941, a concert was held at Northwood House to entertain the troops, although embarrassingly, only five soldiers turned up and the concert was cancelled.

In 1947, a bowling green was added to the estate. The current pavilion was built in 1983/84, when the existing one burnt down.

In August 1965, over 800 guests attended the Royal Yacht Squadron's annual ball at Northwood House. Among the guests was Prince Philip and the Spanish ambassador.

In 1998, the Isle of Wight Council received an offer from a developer, who planned to convert the house into a hotel. However, a public group was formed, calling themselves 'Friends of Northwood House', who fought the proposal. They won and the idea was shelved.

As early as 2002, a charitable scheme was set up, with local citizens being designated as "management trustees". In this way, although the council continued to utilize the building, including its use as a registrar's office, it was jointly looked after by both the council and volunteers.

In 2004, The Isle of Wight Council renovated the downstairs rooms and moved the island's registrar's office into Northwood House.

=== Northwood House Charitable Trust Co Ltd (2010 to date) ===
In 2010, the Isle of Wight Council completely withdrew from Northwood House, with the registrar's office and other council functions being moved elsewhere. This left the property's use and maintenance totally in the hands of the volunteers of the charitable trust.

However, in 2012, the management structure was changed when the original trust was replaced by the Northwood House Charitable Trust Co. Ltd.

The estate continues to depend on the help of volunteers to maintain and operate it. The trades needed for the house include master craftsmen, cleaners, soft furnishing specialists and restoration workers. For the grounds, they need gardeners, arborists and landscape designers.
