= Holy Trinity Church, Cowes =

Coordinates: 50°45′57″N 01°18′07″W

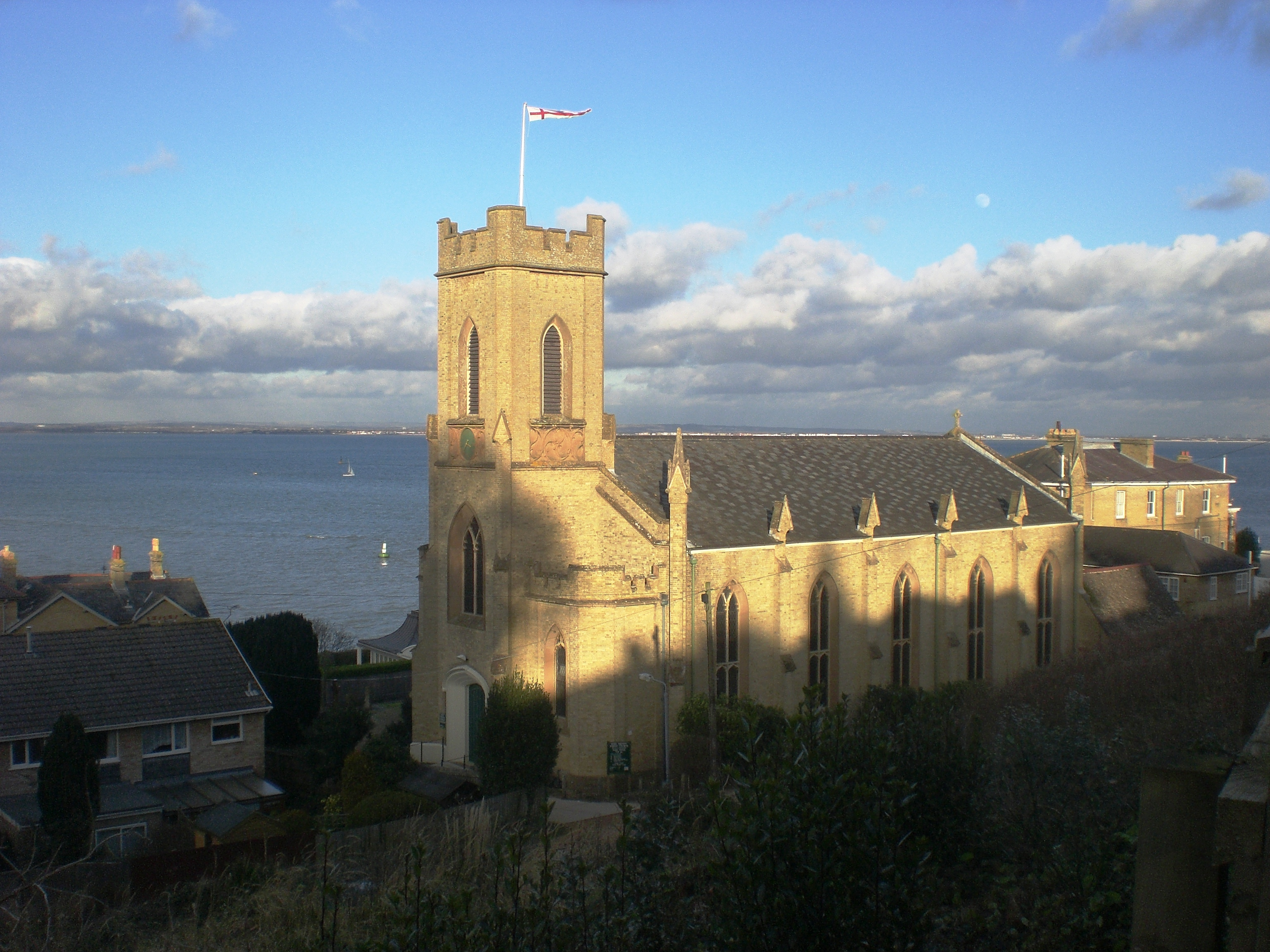
- Holy Trinity Church, Cowes
- Holy Trinity Church, Cowes
- Denomination: Church of England
- Churchmanship: Broad Church

History
- Dedication: Holy Trinity

Administration
- Province: Canterbury
- Diocese: Portsmouth
- Parish: Cowes

Clergy
- Vicar: Rev Ryan Cook

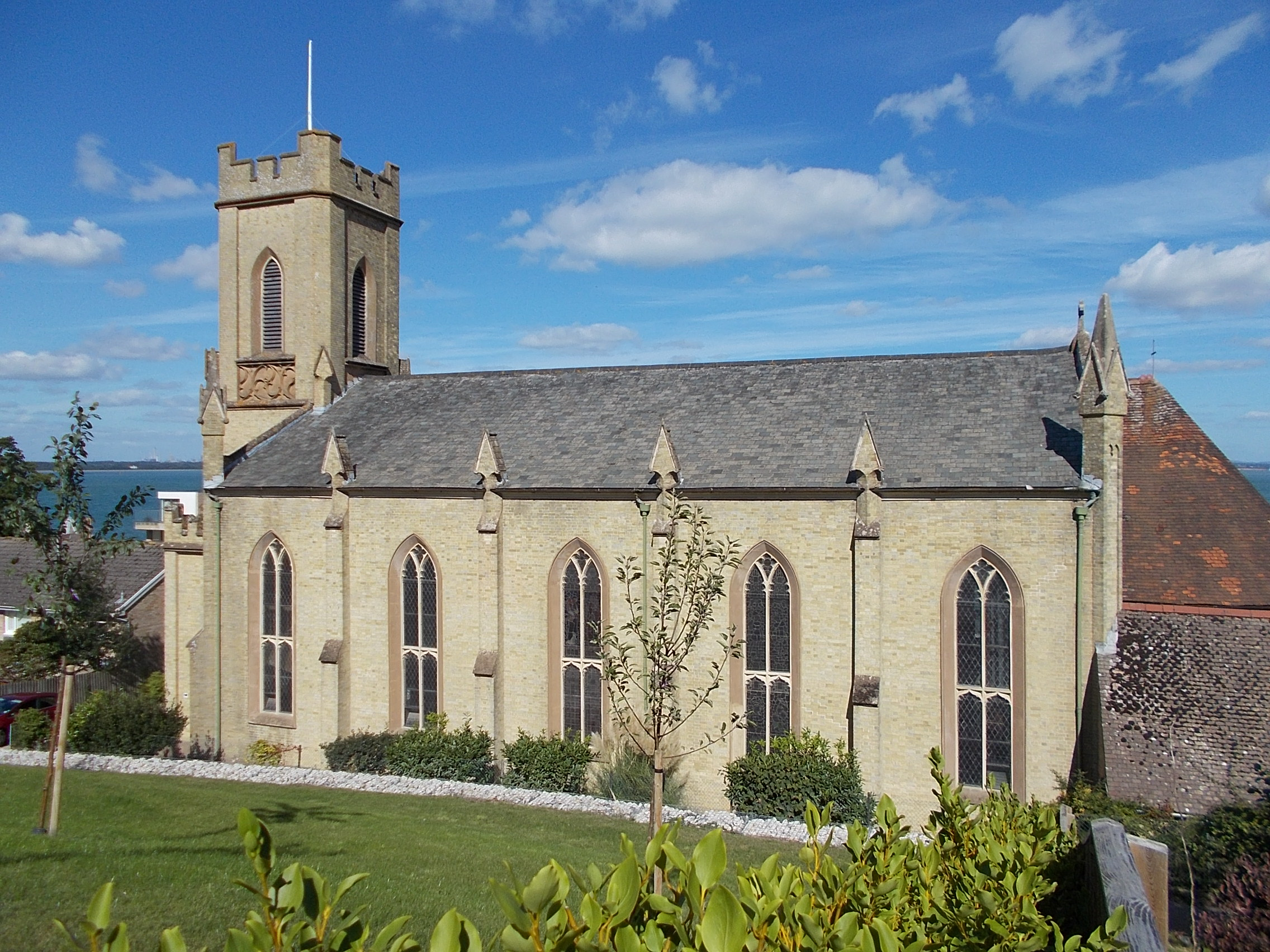
South face of the church

Holy Trinity Church, Cowes is a parish church in the Church of England located in Cowes, Isle of Wight.

== History ==
The church was built in 1832 by the architect Benjamin Bramble.

It has an unusual location at the edge of the sea. Situated on rising land immediately behind the Royal Yacht Squadron it is prominently displayed to passing yachtsmen and its tiered gardens afford marvelous views over the busy waters of the Solent.

It is constructed of Isle of Wight yellow brick in the gothic style with 100 feet long nave walls, 12 external buttresses, and a castellated tower. Inside, the pillar less nave is remarkably light and airy.

The Church was consecrated as a place of worship on Cowes foreshore for sailors and seafarers and it very soon acquired a Royal and yachting patronage which has continued from Queen Victoria to the present day. The nave bears a number of memorial plaques honouring past members of the Royal Yacht Squadron and in the gardens stands the Fastnet Memorial. This rock sculpture was erected in memory of sailors who were killed in the storm which struck the 1979 Fastnet race.

The church is Grade II listed, having first been listed in 1951.

== Parish status ==
The church is grouped with St Mary the Virgin Church, Cowes.

== Organ ==
The church has a three-manual organ by Gray & Davison dating from 1884. A specification of the organ can be found on the National Pipe Organ Register.
