= Isle of Wight County Press =

- Type: Weekly newspaper
- Format: Tabloid
- Publisher: Newsquest Media Group
- Editor: Lori Little
- Founded: 1884
- Language: English
- Headquarters: Innovation Centre, St Cross Business Park, Newport, Isle of Wight PO30 5WB
- Circulation: 8,940 (as of 2024)
- Website: iwcp.co.uk

The Isle of Wight County Press is a local, compact newspaper published every Friday on the Isle of Wight. It is the biggest selling local weekly newspaper in the United Kingdom as of 2025. The paper had been owned locally from its foundation until July 2017, when it was taken over by Newsquest Media Group.

== History ==
The Isle of Wight County Press was established in 1884 with George Alfred Brannon (1851–1938) serving as co-proprietor. The founding of the newspaper represented a continuation of the Brannon family's extensive influence on regional publishing, specifically that of George Alfred's grandfather, George Brannon (1784–1860). The elder Brannon was a self-taught engraver and printer whose work, Vectis Scenery, had visually defined the Island for decades. This family lineage cemented the Brannons' role in shaping the region's historical narrative, a legacy that remained connected to the newspaper for over a century, most notably through the name of the paper's long-time headquarters, Brannon House.

The first compact issue was released on 3 October 2008. Prior to this the paper had always been published in a broadsheet format. The change was made in a response to surveys carried out by the paper in November 2007 claiming 87 percent of islanders in favour of a compact format. Following the first release of the first compact issue, many islanders found the smaller size unsuitable for use on some jobs such as bee keeping.

In June 2017, a takeover offer was received by the paper by Newsquest Media Group, one of the largest local newspaper publishers in the United Kingdom, running other operations locally including the Southern Daily Echo based in Southampton. The offer was met with criticism locally with fears a takeover from a mainland firm could cause the paper to lose its connection to the island. A counter offer made as part of a community bid, however it was ultimately unsuccessful and with the paper being sold to Newsquest in July 2017.

In January 2018 the paper ceased being printed in Newbury, instead moving to Newquest's own printing press in Southampton. At the same time the physical size of the paper decreased. 2018 also saw the establishment of a new newspaper on the Island, the freesheet Isle of Wight Observer; the co-owner of the Observer, Martin Potter, said that he wanted to bring back an Island-owned newspaper after the Newsquest buy-out, but also that he didn't envision the Observer as a rival to the County Press.

In January 2020, long serving editor Alan Marriott returned to his role at the County Press, replacing Emily Pearce who had edited the paper for the previous 12 months. In April 2023, he left the paper for good after some 39 years and was replaced by co-editors Lori Little and Lucy Morgan. By Summer 2024, Lucy Morgan departed the County Press making Lori Little the sole editor.

In August 2024, the Isle of Wight County Press sold its home for the past 30 years, Brannon House, to the local charity Friends of the Animals. After a period of working from home, a new office was opened at Innovation Centre, St Cross Business Park in early December 2024.

In December 2024, the Press made 230,000 digitized newspaper pages available via Newspapers.com.

== Circulation ==
As of December 2023, the paper had an audited circulation of 10,084 copies, compared to a local population of 140,500. The paper has seen a massive drop in circulation, losing 66% of its print readership in just 10 years - falling from 30,912 at the end of 2013 to 10,084 in December 2023.

== Website ==
The Isle of Wight County Press website was launched in 1999 and features headline articles updated on a daily basis. These will often appear on the website before featuring in the next issue, allowing readers to be updated daily instead of each week. The website also features videos and photo galleries that would not normally be available in a standard issue. During June 2009 the website passed 1 million views for the first time, attracting a record figure of 1,001,705 coupled with another record of 71,068 unique visitors. The increase in visitor numbers was said to have been boosted by interest in the Isle of Wight Council election results and Isle of Wight Festival coverage. The Isle of Wight County Press passed its 3 million online viewers in January 2013.
