= Isle of Wight Observer =

The Isle of Wight Observer is a free newspaper published on the Isle of Wight every Friday. It was launched on 10 August 2018 in a tabloid format, and is distributed through supermarkets, newsagents and other outlets across the island. It is regulated by Impress. The weekly print-run is printed on the newspaper's masthead. In August 2023 it declared 18,500 newspapers published with a digital subscriber base of "over 4,500".

The editor is Carole Dennett (the former partner and parliamentary assistant of the island's previous MP, Andrew Turner). Since 2019, it has operated through the company IW Observer Ltd, of which Miss Dennett is listed as the sole director. Prior to this, it operated through the company Isle of Wight Observer Ltd, which had Martin Potter as a director alongside her. Mr Potter is a former owner, editor and publisher of Island Life Magazine.

When it launched, Potter told the Press Gazette that: "For the past 134 years the Isle of Wight County Press has been the only substantial newspaper on the island and we are trying to provide an alternative to it, not compete with it.”

The decision to set up the Observer came after a complaint Dennett made against the Isle of Wight County Press was rejected by the Independent Press Standards Organisation (IPSO). She had accused the paper of inaccuracy, harassment and breach of privacy. In its ruling, IPSO said that the stories carried by the paper covered matters of “significant public interest” and constituted “legitimate comment.”

== Earlier title ==
There was a title of the same name which was a regional newspaper based in Ryde. It had a main run of 3,327 editions from 1852 to 1922.

It was founded by Ebenezer Hartnall in December 1845; but on 27 June 1846, after thirty issues had been published, he ceased publication, perhaps due to a combination of low sales, stamp duty and the tax on advertisements. George Butler, an apprentice of Hartnall, relaunched the newspaper in 1852, and continued to publish it until 1865. After this, until 1893, Hannah Butler is listed in Mitchell's Press Directory as the Proprietress.

The paper continued publication until 1922, when it was incorporated into the Isle of Wight Times.
