= Arthur Cates =

English architect

Arthur Cates FRIBA (29 April 1829 – 15 May 1901) was an English architect.

== Life ==
The son of James Cates by his wife Susan, daughter of John Rose, he was born at 38 Alfred Street, Bedford Square, London. After education at King's College School he entered as pupil the office of Sydney Smirke, in 1846. Cates's executed works were not numerous; but in 1870 he succeeded Sir James Pennethorne as architect to the land revenues of the crown under the Commissioners of Woods and Forests. He then controlled the architecture of the Crown Estate in London.

Cates, who joined the Architectural Association in 1847, became an associate of the Royal Institute of British Architects (RIBA) in 1856, a fellow in 1874, and a member of the council in 1879; he served as vice-president from 1888 to 1892. Architectural education was one of his concerns, and he long controlled the RIBA examination system. From 1882 to 1896 he was chairman of its board of examiners, and preliminary, intermediate, and final examinations were brought in. He was also a fellow of the Surveyors' Institution.

From 1859 to 1892 Cates acted as hon. secretary of the Architectural Publication Society. When in 1894 the tribunal of appeal under the London Building Act 1894 (57 & 58 Vict. c. ccxiii) was appointed, he was elected the first chairman, and was re-elected in 1900 for a further term of five years.

Cates died at his residence, 12 York Terrace, Regent's Park, on 15 May 1901, and was buried at Woking.

== Legacy ==
As surveyor to the Honourable Society of the Inner Temple, Cates designed in 1887 the archway and gatehouse leading from Tudor Street to King's Bench Walk. He formed a good architectural library, and many of his books were given or bequeathed to the library of the Royal Institute of British Architects. He bequeathed an annual prize bearing his name, which after his death was awarded in connection with the RIBA examinations.

== Works ==
Cates assisted in the compilation of the Architectural Dictionary, which his friend Wyatt Papworth edited. He wrote for the Dictionary of National Biography memoirs of Wyatt Papworth, his father and brother.

== Family ==
Cates married in 1881 Rosa, daughter of William Rose, who survived him. There was no issue of the marriage.

== Notes ==
Attribution

This article incorporates text from a publication now in the public domain: Lee, Sidney, ed. (1912). "Cates, Arthur". Dictionary of National Biography (2nd supplement). Vol. 1. London: Smith, Elder & Co.
