= List of places of worship on the Isle of Wight =

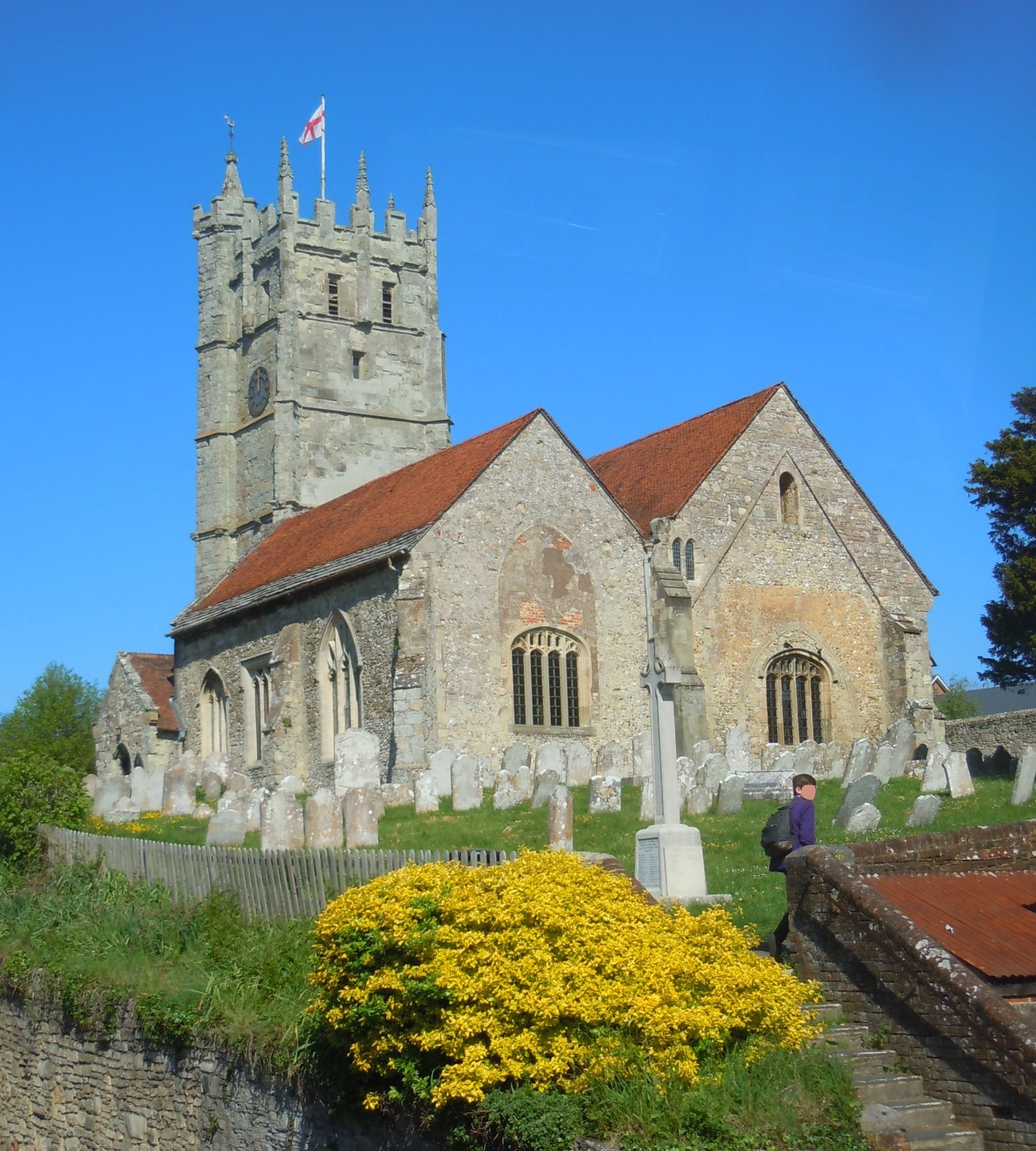
St Mary the Virgin's Church stands high above the village street in Carisbrooke and has 12th-century origins.

As of 2019 there are about 130 places of worship in use on the Isle of Wight, England's largest island. A wide range of Christian denominations are represented, and Muslims have a mosque in the island's main town of Newport. The diamond-shaped, 146-square-mile (380 km^{2}) island lies in the English Channel, separated from the county of Hampshire by the Solent. Its population of around 140,000 is spread across several small towns and dozens of villages. Many of the island's churches and chapels are in the ancient ports of Yarmouth and Newport, the Victorian seaside resorts of Ryde, Sandown, Shanklin and Ventnor, and the twin towns of Cowes and East Cowes; but even the smallest villages often have their own Anglican parish churches, such as Kingston, at one time one of the smallest parishes, with St James' Church, and sometimes a Nonconformist chapel. Methodism has been particularly strong on the island for over 200 years, and two of England's oldest Roman Catholic churches are also located here.

Sixty-two churches and chapels have been awarded listed status by Historic England or its predecessor organisations in recognition of their architectural and historical interest. These range from the large and ancient parish churches in villages such as Arreton, Brading and Carisbrooke to the thatch-roofed St Agnes' Church at Freshwater Bay and the concrete-framed St Faith's Church at Cowes—both of the early 20th century—and from the simple and plain Methodist chapel at Godshill to the elaborate Castlehold Baptist Chapel in Newport. A building is defined as "listed" when it is placed on a statutory register of buildings of "special architectural or historic interest" in accordance with the Planning (Listed Buildings and Conservation Areas) Act 1990. The Department for Digital, Culture, Media and Sport, a Government department, is responsible for listing; Historic England, a non-departmental public body, acts as an agency of the department to administer the process and advise the department on relevant issues. There are three grades of listing status. Grade I, the highest, is defined as being of "exceptional interest"; Grade II* is used for "particularly important buildings of more than special interest"; and Grade II, the lowest, is used for buildings of "special interest". As of February 2001, there were 26 Grade I-listed buildings, 55 with Grade II* status and 1,823 Grade II-listed buildings on the Isle of Wight.

Various administrative areas operated by the Church of England, the Roman Catholic Church, the United Reformed Church, Baptists and Methodists cover churches on the island which are part of their denominations. These areas include dioceses, archdeaconries, networks and circuits.

== Overview of the island and its places of worship ==
=== Geography ===
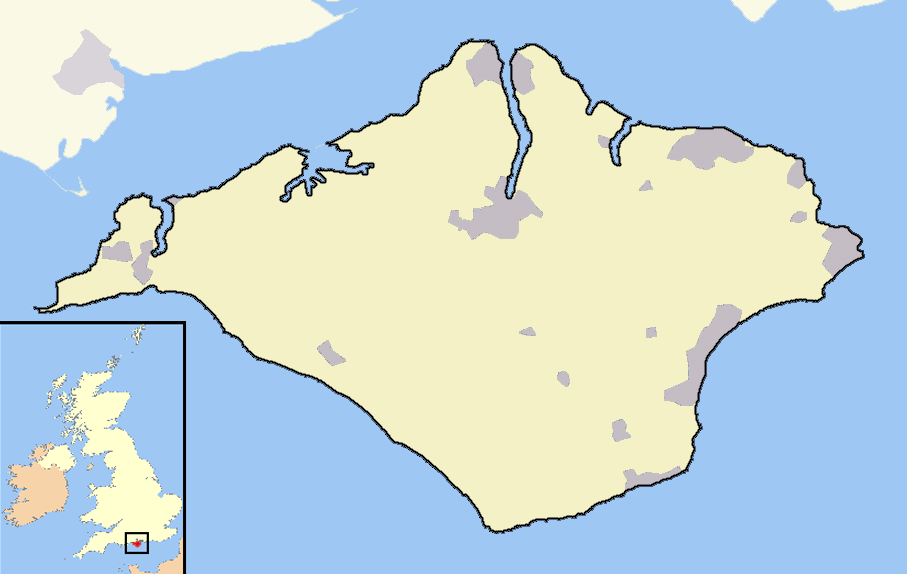
The Isle of Wight is situated off the south coast of England.

The Isle of Wight is situated in the English Channel off the south coast of England. The Solent strait, generally 2–3 miles (3–5 km) wide, separates it from the mainland to the north. The island measures 22 miles (35 km) from east to west and 13 miles (21 km) from north to south at its extreme points; in total it covers 146.8 square miles (380 km^{2}). The resident population was estimated to be 139,105 in mid-2014, a slight increase on the 138,400 at the time of the United Kingdom Census 2011. Only seven towns have a population of 6,000 or more. Ryde, whose population in 2011 was approximately 18,700, developed from two villages in the late 18th century: Lower Ryde, on the seashore, was for centuries a landing point for boats from the mainland, and this was formalised when a pier was built in 1814. Upper Ryde, its inland neighbour, was connected to it in 1780, and rapid development ensued through the Regency and early Victorian eras. Newport, the county town, is slightly smaller (population 17,200) but much older: founded c. 1180 as a "new port" for the island, centrally located on the River Medina, it retains its medieval grid pattern of streets (although the oldest surviving buildings are 17th-century). Cowes (Note: Sometimes known as "West Cowes" or "Cowes Town" to distinguish it from East Cowes.) and East Cowes, facing each other across the Medina estuary and connected by a chain ferry, have 14,400 and 7,800 residents respectively; they developed as industrial and port towns in the 17th and 18th centuries, and became fashionable residential areas in the 19th century. Stimulated by the arrival of the railway in 1864, Sandown (population 7,200) developed as a seaside resort in the last quarter of the 19th century, and the ancient village of Shanklin grew rapidly at the same time, reaching an estimated population of 7,100 by 2011. Ventnor (population 6,000) was already more developed by the time the railway arrived in 1866: early 19th-century visitors discovered the village's dramatic setting, and formal urban planning began in the 1830s.

=== Church history ===
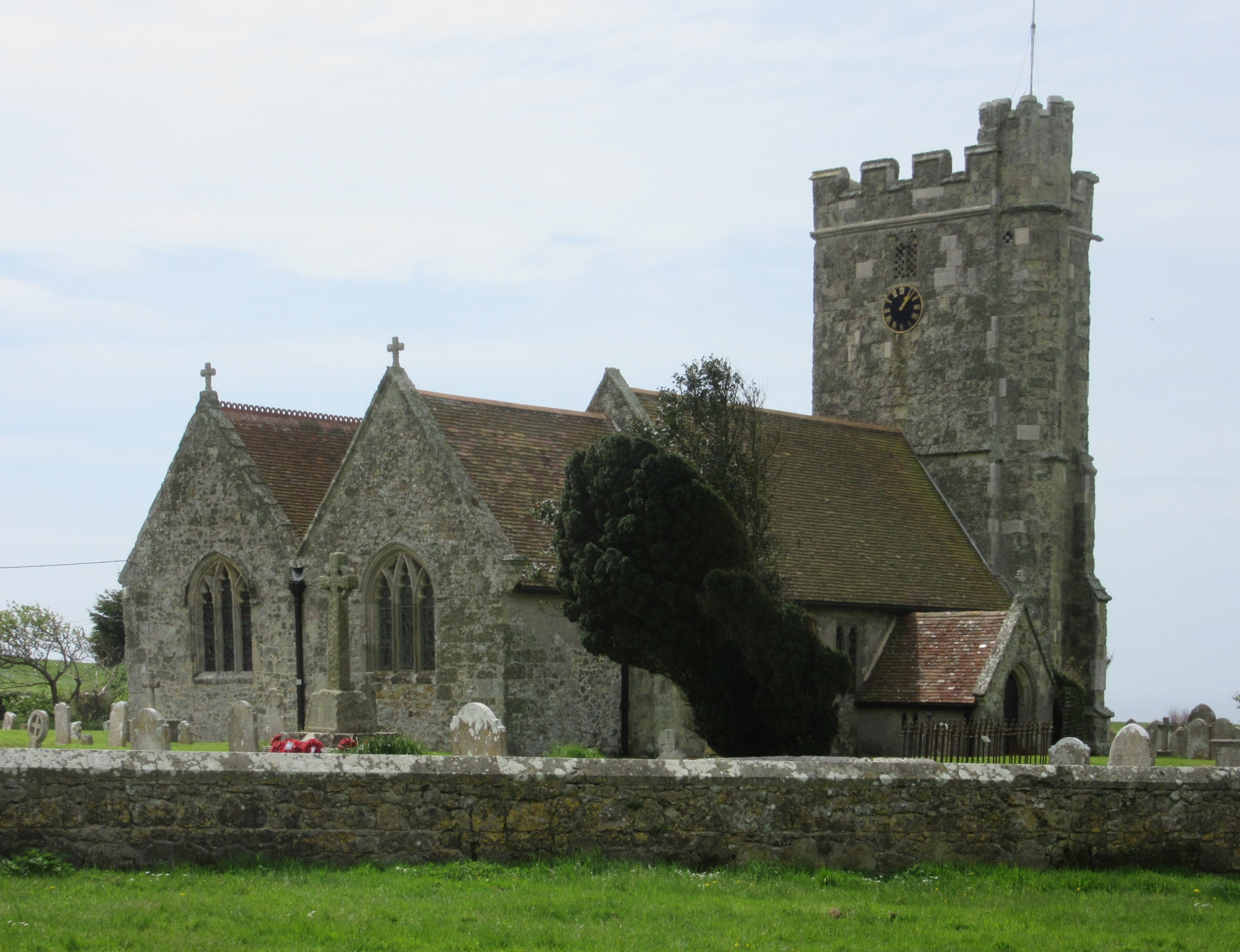
St Andrew's Church at Chale is in the Perpendicular Gothic style.

The island was converted to Christianity in the late 7th century, although sources differ as to who was responsible: the Anglo-Saxon Chronicle identifies Wulfhere of Mercia, but Bede (writing in the 8th century) gives a date of 686 and names Cædwalla of Wessex. A series of parishes were later established, some very large and spanning the whole island from north to south. By the time of the Domesday survey in 1086 there were ten churches on the island, and some chapels originally associated with the island's many manors became parish churches in their own right later in the Middle Ages. Of the churches established in the Saxon era, only fragments remain: (Note: In this section, when only the name of a village is shown, the Anglican parish church is being referred to.) Arreton and Freshwater both retain structural features from that period. Likewise, Norman churches survive only in parts, as at Shalfleet (the massive square tower), Yaverland (a "remarkable 12th-century doorway") and Wootton (where St Edmund's Church also has an intricately moulded Norman doorway). More significant is the island's array of Gothic church architecture—particularly that of the Early English period. Notable Early English work can be seen in the parish churches of Brading, Calbourne and Newchurch. Decorated Gothic features survive at Arreton and Freshwater, and there are Perpendicular Gothic towers at Carisbrooke, Chale and Gatcombe, arcades at Brading, Brighstone and Mottistone, and porches at Arreton, Niton and Whitwell.

The 17th century was a period of church restoration and some new construction. Yarmouth (1626) retains much of its original appearance; St Mary's Church at Cowes dates from 1657 but has been rebuilt; and rebuilding of older churches took place at Newchurch, Shalfleet, Shorwell and Godshill. Monuments to prominent island families such as the Oglander and Worsley baronets and the Leighs of Godshill are another important feature of this era. At several churches, though, church architecture and fittings of this era and of the 18th century was swept away amid Victorian restoration, and the island's stock of Anglican churches grew substantially in the 19th century in line with urban growth and the splitting up of ancient parishes. New churches replaced smaller medieval buildings at St Lawrence (1878, by George Gilbert Scott) and Bonchurch (by Benjamin Ferrey, 1847–48) and the ruined chapel in the hamlet of Newtown (1835, by local architect A. F. Livesay). In St Helens, the ruined Norman-era church dedicated to St Helena was replaced further inland in 1717, but the new church was rebuilt in 1829 and substantially altered and extended in 1862. Many Anglican churches on the island were either built or reconstructed in the 1850s or 1860s, mostly in a range of Gothic Revival styles—some with distinctive features such as the tower at Whippingham, the tall spire at Holy Trinity, Ventnor and the interior of St Mary's, Cowes, where a new church with a complex polychrome brickwork interior was grafted on to the "remarkable" tower designed by John Nash. Thomas Hellyer of Ryde, described by Nikolaus Pevsner as a "very individualistic" and "remarkable" architect, was responsible for several churches in this era—both new buildings (at Bembridge, Havenstreet, Oakfield, Seaview, St Saviour's at Shanklin and the now closed Holy Trinity at Ryde) and rebuilding work (at Binstead and East Cowes).

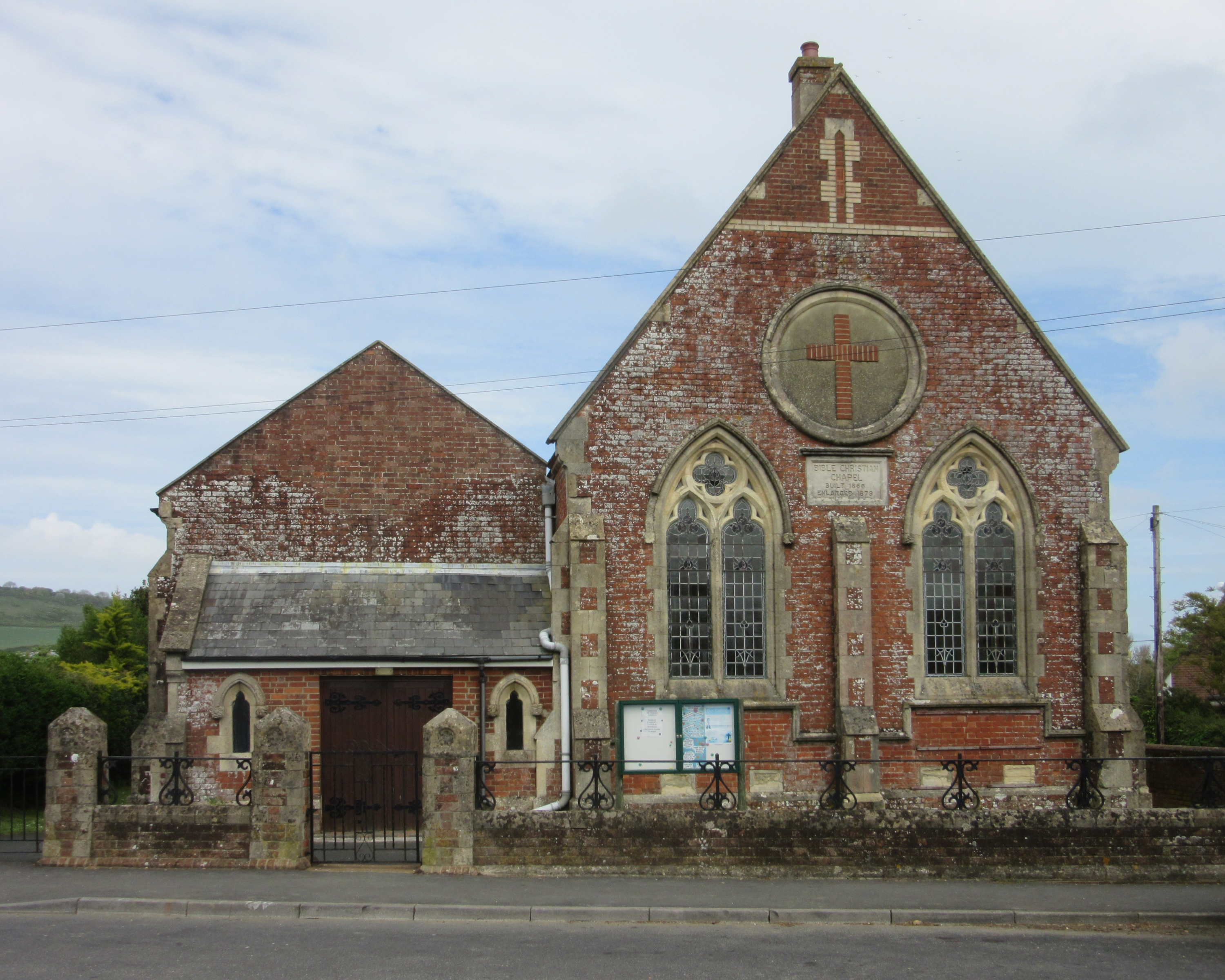
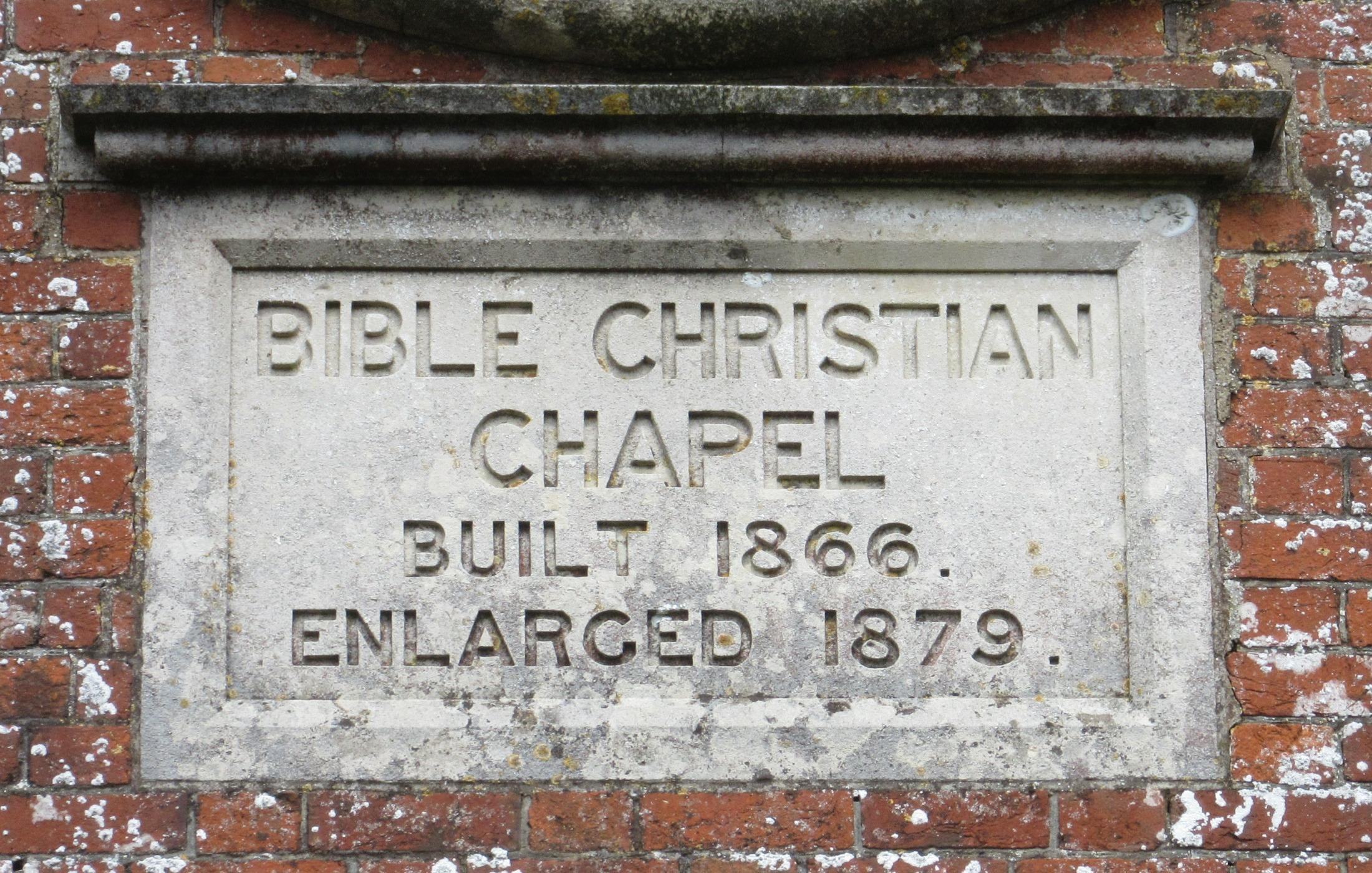
Many Methodist chapels survive in both urban and rural surroundings. The chapel in Arreton (left) opened in 1866 for Bible Christians and was extended in 1879 (right).

=== Roman Catholic ===
Roman Catholic churches are found in the island's towns and larger villages. Those at Cowes and Newport, both dedicated to Saint Thomas of Canterbury, are the island's only 18th-century churches of any denomination and are nationally important because of their early dates: the Roman Catholic Relief Act was passed in 1791, and Newport's church was built in that year, followed five years later by the Cowes church. Architecturally dissimilar, both churches were funded by Elizabeth Heneage. St Mary's Church at Ryde came next, designed by Joseph Hansom in the 1840s, and by the early 20th century Ventnor, East Cowes, Sandown and Shanklin had their own churches. St Patrick's at Sandown survives in its original condition, whereas St David's at East Cowes and the Sacred Heart at Shanklin suffered bomb damage in World War II were rebuilt after the war, and the Church of Our Lady and St Wilfrid in Ventnor burnt down in 2006 and was rebuilt in 2015. In 1965 a purpose-built Catholic church opened in Bembridge, which had a long history of Catholic worship in private chapels and a former Wesleyan church. Similarly St Saviour's Church at Totland (1923) succeeds a private chapel which had opened in 1871 in the nearby manor house. The chapel at St Dominic's Priory at Carisbrooke and a now vanished tin tabernacle at Appuldurcombe House were also used for public worship in the early 20th century and before, and chapels at Quarr Abbey at Binstead and St Cecilia's Abbey at Ryde are still registered for public worship. Nikolaus Pevsner, who was mostly dismissive of the island's 20th-century architecture, considered St Saviour's to be "the most striking" church of any denomination apart from Quarr Abbey and its chapel, which he identified as "the dominant architectural achievement" of the century.

=== Nonconformist ===
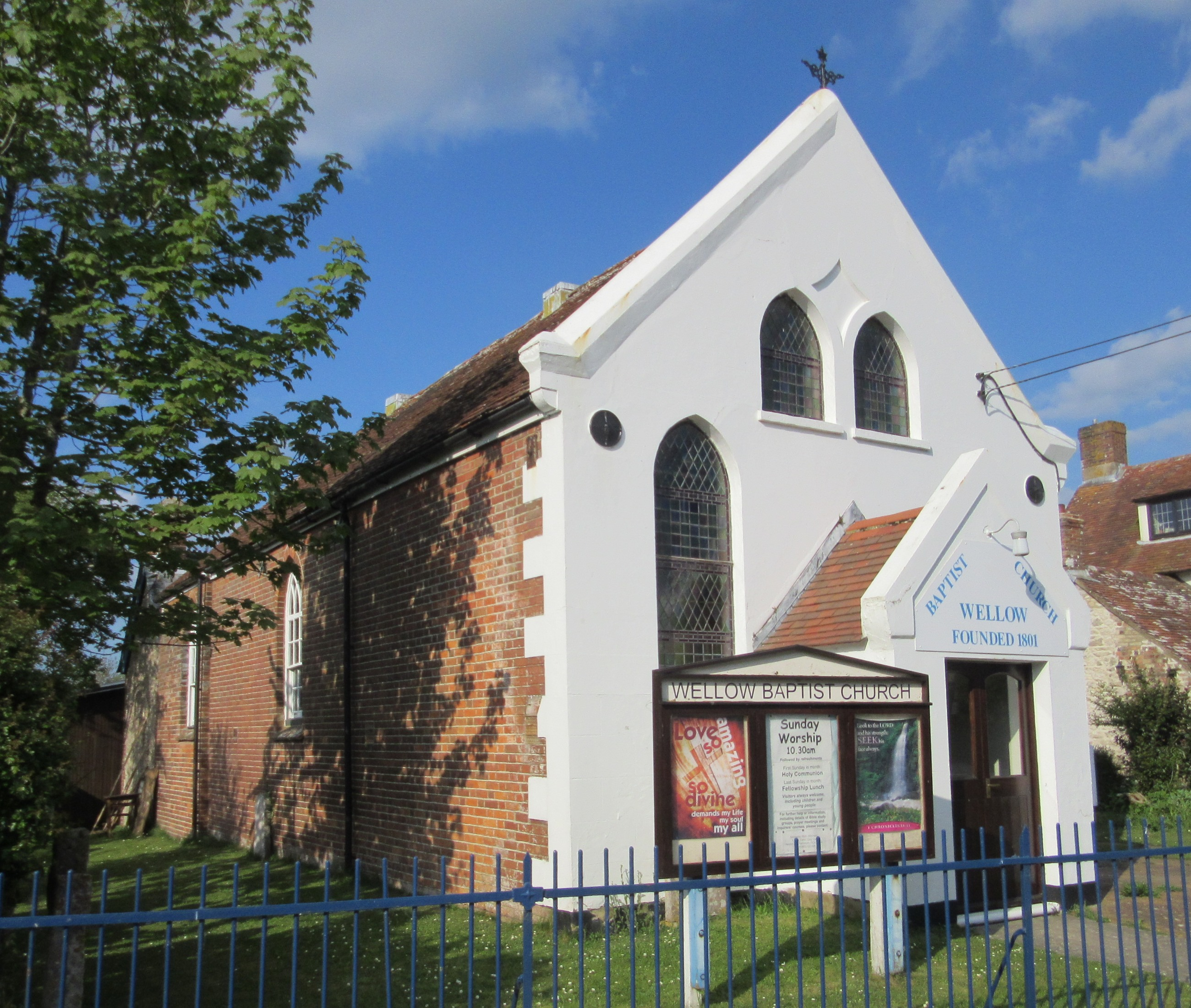
Wellow Baptist Chapel has served worshippers in this rural part of the island since the early 19th century.

Among Nonconformist groups, Methodism is particularly prominent. Its history on the island can be traced back to 1735, when John and Charles Wesley visited and Charles preached at Cowes; John's subsequent visits included a trip in 1781 to open a chapel in Newport. Six years later the first permanent preacher was appointed: originally a Wesleyan, Mary Toms joined the Bible Christian Methodists in 1817, and the Isle of Wight "[became] a stronghold of the Bible Christian movement". (Note: The present Methodist Church of Great Britain, to which all Methodist churches on the island now belong, was formed in 1932 after a succession of mergers between the Bible Christian Church, Primitive Methodists, Wesleyan Methodists and other groups.) By 1851, when a religious census was carried out in the United Kingdom, the movement had 26 places of worship. Many old chapels built by the Bible Christians survive, for example at Brading (where Toms herself founded a "preaching house" in 1837), Rookley (1859), Arreton (1866) and Newport (1879–80). The Wesleyan branch of Methodism was also well-supported—there were 24 places of worship for Wesleyans in 1851—and many of their chapels remain in use, such as the "monumental" church in Ryde, the 1838 chapel at Godshill and the 1864 chapel at Niton. A few Primitive Methodist chapels were also built, although none remain in Methodist use. Examples include Newport (now used by the Salvation Army), Ryde and Sandown (1866). New Methodist chapels were built throughout the 20th century, for example in Lake (a "stylish, typically late 1950s" building) and Brighstone (1999), and in 2014 a new church opened at Freshwater to serve that village and nearby Totland. In contrast, Baptist chapels are confined to the main towns and a few villages. Several congregations have a long unbroken history of worship: the three surviving rural chapels date from 1805 (Wellow), 1836 (Freshwater) and 1849 (Niton), and Castlehold Baptist Church at Newport was built in 1812. The Castlehold congregation seceded from the town's original Baptist chapel, which later developed a Unitarian character which it still holds. Congregationalism gained little ground on the island, but independent Congregational churches survive at Langbridge near Newchurch (founded in 1845) and Newport—where a 21st-century building houses a congregation with 17th-century origins. Congregational chapels which joined the United Reformed Church when that denomination was formed in 1972 can be found in Ryde and Shanklin, which now operate as a joint pastorate called Isle of Wight United Reformed Church; there was another at Freshwater, but this closed in December 2021.

=== Other Christian denominations ===
In the 20th century a greater variety of Christian denominations began to be represented, mainly in the island's towns. Pentecostal churches of various types can be found in Newport, Ryde and Sandown; Spiritualists worship in Cowes (where a congregation has met since the 1930s), Ryde and Ventnor; Quakers, the Salvation Army and The Church of Jesus Christ of Latter-day Saints have premises in Newport; and there are four Kingdom Halls of Jehovah's Witnesses. There are also various gospel halls and Evangelical and non-denominational churches, some of which occupy former chapels built by other communities. For example, Zion Chapel in Swanmore and the Avenue Road Evangelical Church in Sandown were originally mid-19th-century Wesleyan chapels; the Ryde premises of the Grace Church IoW was built as the Elmfield Congregational Church; and in Cowes, The Community Church – IoW occupies a former Church of England mission hall.

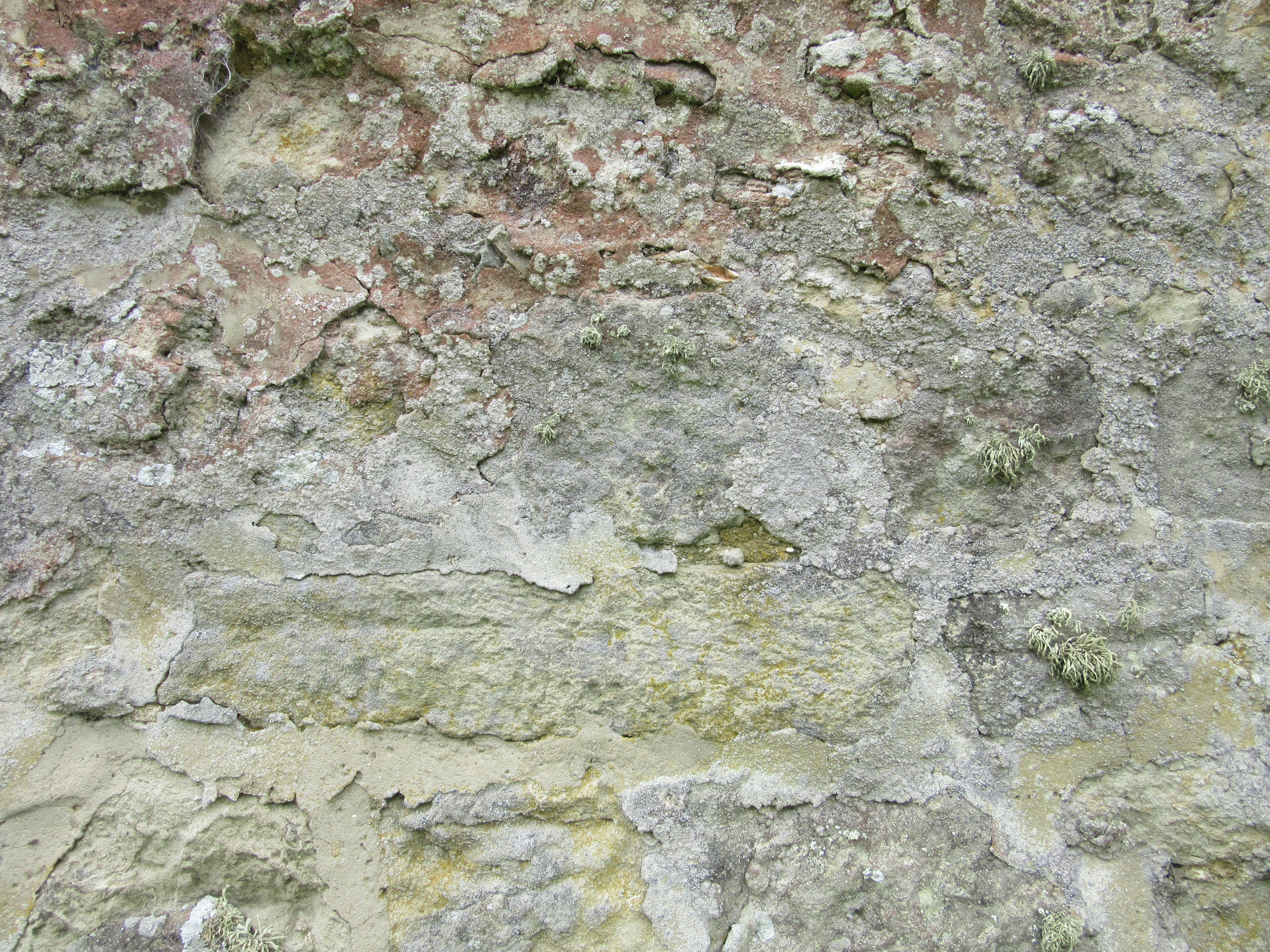
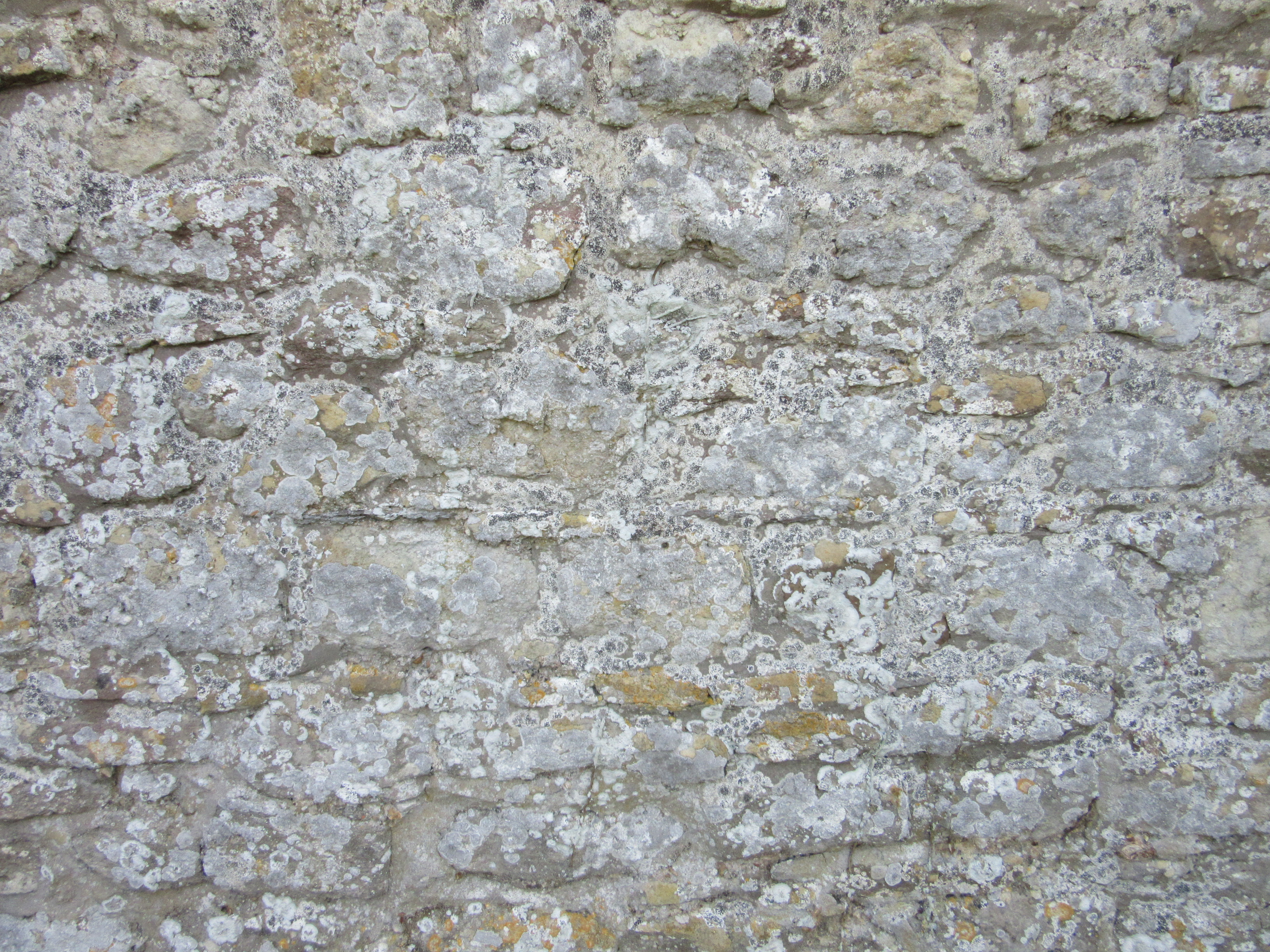
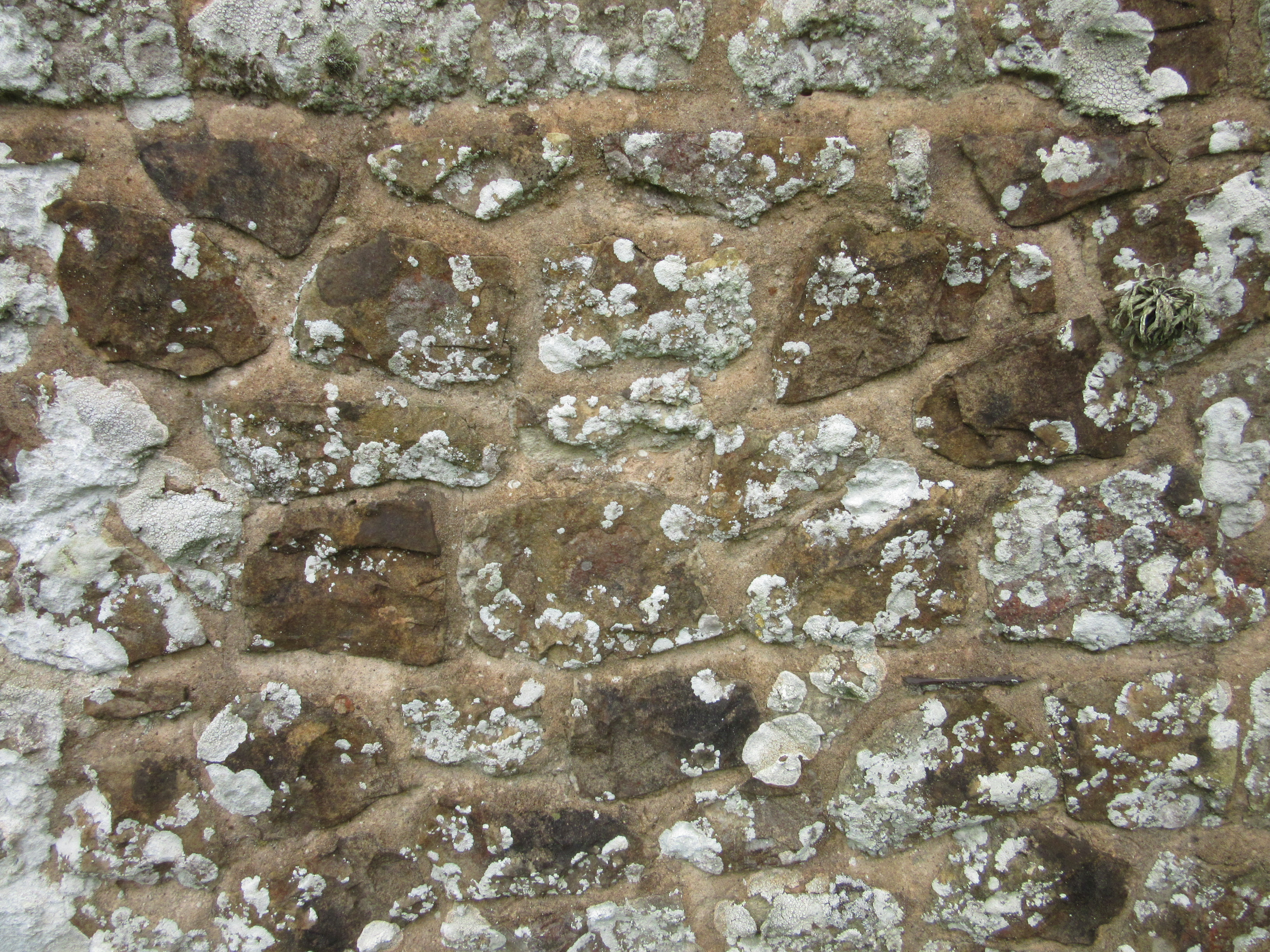
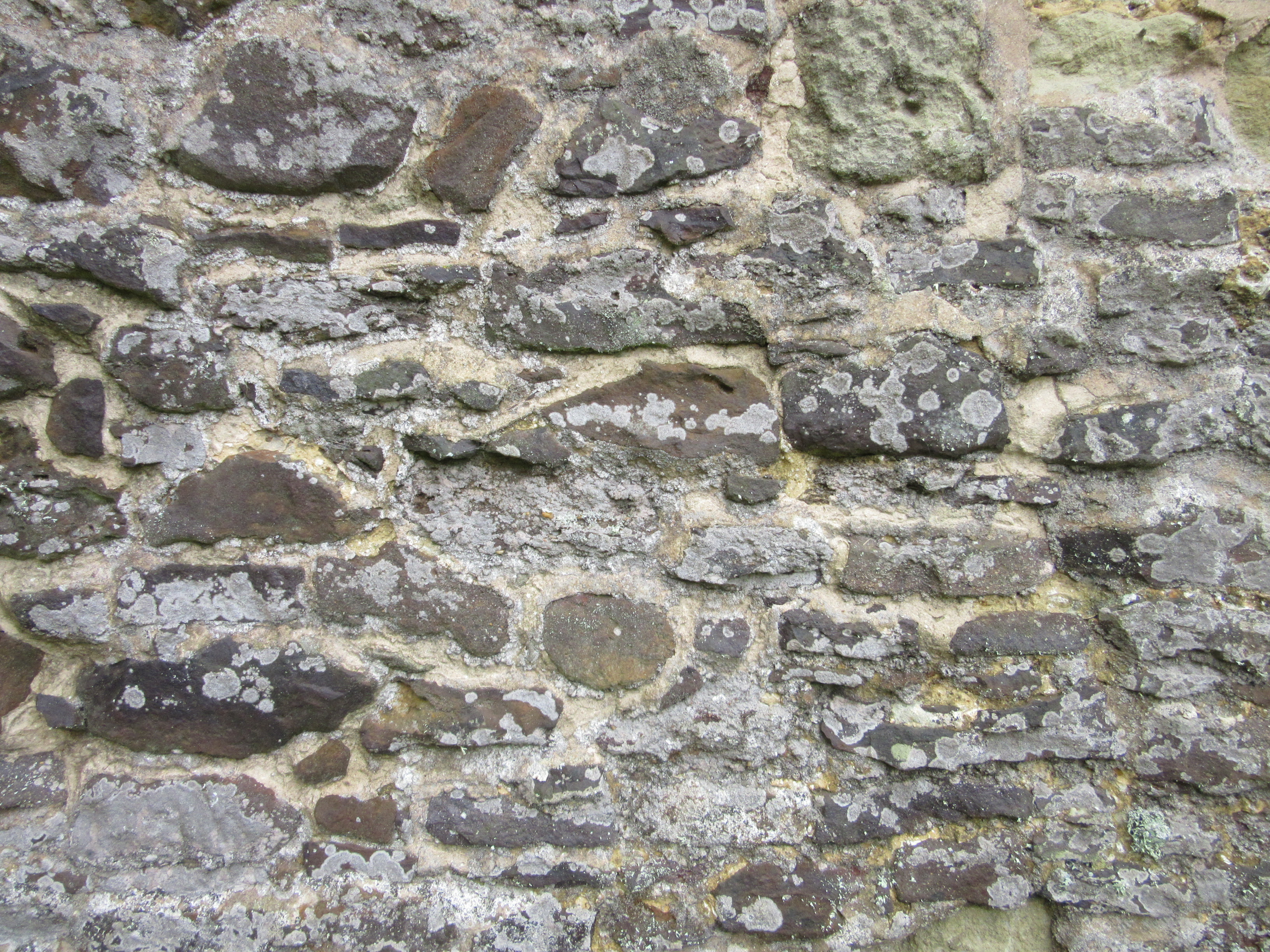
Examples of stonework at the parish churches of Godshill, Wootton, Brook and Mottistone (left to right).

=== Fabric of buildings ===
Sandstone is the Isle of Wight's most important building material. Upper Greensand formations were found in several parts of the southern half of the island, particularly the Undercliff area near Ventnor, and were extracted for centuries until supplies became exhausted in the 19th century. Until the 16th century it was used almost exclusively for churches, both on the island and elsewhere in southern England. Limestone was quarried extensively from the Bembridge Beds off the island's east coast, and from deposits around Ryde, Binstead and Gurnard, from Saxon times until the Victorian era. A harder, more durable but scarcer variety ("Quarr stone") was used in the island's Saxon churches, and evidence of this survives at Freshwater and Arreton. More common within these quarries was the less solid "Binstead stone", which occurs in many churches on the island and was still used around Ryde during the town's Victorian expansion. In contrast to other downland areas of southern England, flint was used rarely because better quality stone was so readily available.

Historic England, the body responsible for listed buildings and other heritage assets in England, also publishes an annual "Heritage at Risk Register"—a survey of assets at risk through decay, damage and similar issues. The Anglican churches identified as at risk in the latest update were St Mary's Church in Cowes (affected by ingress of water), St James's Church in East Cowes (damp and structural problems), All Saints Church in Godshill (decaying stonework), St Thomas's Minster in Newport (decaying stonework and roofs), St John the Baptist's Church in Niton (decaying stonework, roof damage and ingress of water), St John's Church in Sandown (decaying stonework and ingress of water), the Church of St Saviour-on-the-Cliff in Shanklin (severe salt spalling of stonework and damage to windows), St Paul's Church in Shanklin (decaying stonework and timberwork and damage to windows) and Holy Trinity Church in Ventnor (decaying stonework). The Catholic Church of St Mary in Ryde is at risk due to water ingress.

== Religious affiliation ==
According to the United Kingdom Census 2011, 138,265 people live on the Isle of Wight. Of these, 60.52% identified themselves as Christian, 0.38% were Muslim, 0.23% were Hindu, 0.33% were Buddhist, 0.09% were Jewish, 0.03% were Sikh, 0.65% followed another religion, 29.62% claimed no religious affiliation and 8.15% did not state their religion. The proportions of Christians and people who followed no religion were higher than the figures in England as a whole (59.38% and 24.74% respectively), and the proportion of people who did not answer this census question was also higher than the overall figure of 7.18%. Islam, Judaism, Hinduism, Sikhism and Buddhism had a much lower following on the island than in the country overall: in 2011, 5.02% of people in England were Muslim, 1.52% were Hindu, 0.79% were Sikh, 0.49% were Jewish and 0.45% were Buddhist.

== Administration ==
=== Anglican churches ===
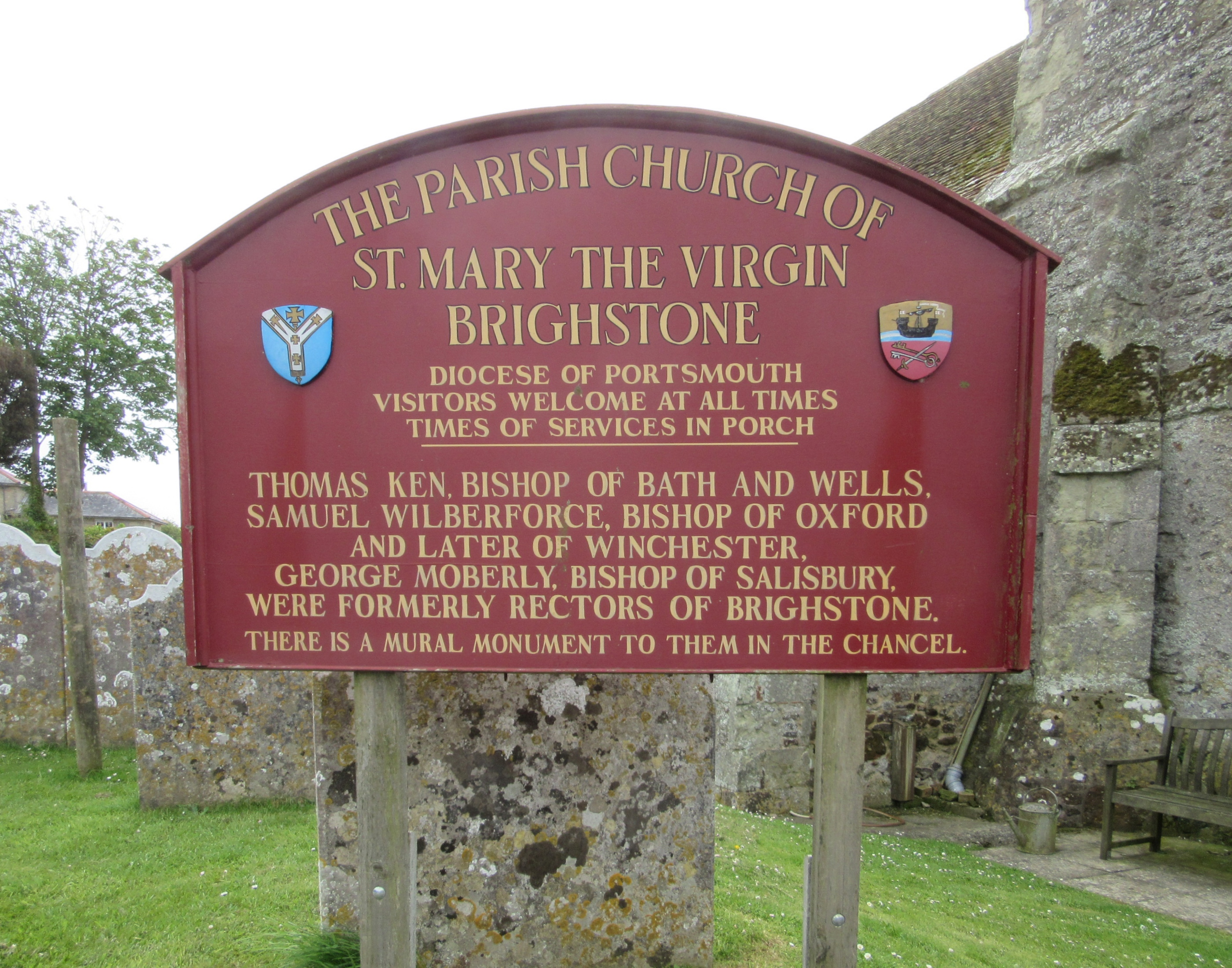
The signboard outside Brighstone parish church shows that it is in the Diocese of Portsmouth, whose coat of arms appears on the right.

All Church of England churches on the island are part of the Anglican Diocese of Portsmouth and the Archdeaconry of the Isle of Wight. This archdeaconry, one of three in the diocese, is split into two deaneries: East Wight and West Wight. The 33 churches in East Wight Deanery are at Arreton, Bembridge (Holy Trinity and St Luke's mission church), Binstead, Bonchurch (old and new churches), Brading, Godshill, Havenstreet, Lake, Newchurch, Niton, Ryde (All Saints, Holy Trinity and St James' in the town centre, St John's in the Oakfield area and St Michael and All Angels at Swanmore), Sandown (Christ Church and St John the Evangelist's), Seaview, Shanklin (St Blasius, St Peter's and St Saviour's), St Helens (St Helen's Church and St Catherine-by-the-Green), St Lawrence (old and new churches), Ventnor (Holy Trinity, St Alban's and St Catherine's), Whitwell, Wroxall and Yaverland.

West Wight Deanery administers 28 churches: at Barton, Brighstone, Brook, Calbourne, Carisbrooke (St Mary the Virgin's and St Nicholas-in-Castro), Chale, Cowes (Holy Trinity, St Faith's and St Mary the Virgin's), East Cowes, Freshwater (All Saints and St Agnes'), Gatcombe, Gurnard, Mottistone, Newport (St John the Baptist's and St Thomas's), Newtown, Northwood, Shalfleet, Shorwell, Thorley, Totland, Whippingham, Wootton (St Mark's and St Edmund's) and Yarmouth.

=== Roman Catholic Churches ===
The island's nine Catholic churches are administered by the Isle of Wight Pastoral Area, part of Deanery 5 of the Roman Catholic Diocese of Portsmouth. The Isle of Wight Pastoral Area has six parishes: Cowes, East Cowes, Newport and Totland Bay each have one church. The parish of Ryde covers churches at Ryde and Bembridge and South Wight parish includes the churches at Sandown, Shanklin and Ventnor. Sunday Masses are open to the public are also offered at the chapels of Quarr Abbey near Binstead and St Cecilia's Abbey at Ryde, both of which belong to the Solesmes Congregation of the Order of Saint Benedict. Both are administratively within Ryde parish. The Verbum Dei Retreat Centre is behind Carisbrooke Priory, formerly St Dominic's Priory, and is part of Newport parish for administrative purposes.

=== Other denominations ===
The Baptist churches at Cowes, Niton, Ryde, Sandown, Ventnor and Wellow, Castlehold Baptist Church in Newport and Colwell Baptist Church at Freshwater are part of the Southern Counties Baptist Association.

The Isle of Wight Methodist Circuit administers the island's Methodist churches. As of 2016 there were 24 congregations on the island, although not all have their own church: Ventnor's Methodists worship in a church hall and Yarmouth's congregation shares the Anglican church. The circuit is one of 14 in the District of Southampton.

Grace Church (Isle of Wight), which has chapels at Ryde and Seaview, belongs to two Evangelical groups: the Fellowship of Independent Evangelical Churches (FIEC), a pastoral and administrative network of about 500 churches with an evangelical outlook, and Affinity (formerly the British Evangelical Council), a network of conservative Evangelical congregations throughout Great Britain.

The Spiritualist churches at Cowes, Ryde and Ventnor belong to the Spiritualists' National Union. All are within the organisation's Southern District, which also covers Dorset, Hampshire and Wiltshire.

Newport Congregational Church is part of the Congregational Federation, an association of independent Congregational churches in Great Britain. The federation came into existence in 1972 when the Congregational Church in England and Wales merged with several other denominations to form the United Reformed Church. Certain congregations wanted to remain independent of this, and instead joined the Congregational Federation. As of January 2021 there were 235 churches in the Federation.

== Listed status ==
Grade	Criteria
Grade I	Buildings of exceptional interest, sometimes considered to be internationally important.
Grade II*	Particularly important buildings of more than special interest.
Grade II	Buildings of national importance and special interest.
Locally listed (L)	Buildings not on the national list but considered by the Isle of Wight Council to be "locally important [in] contributing to the character and sense of place on the Island". (Note: Such buildings must meet at least two of the following criteria: historic interest; architectural, artistic and design merit; survival; townscape merit; and archaeological interest.)

== Current places of worship ==
Current places of worship
Name	Image	Location	Denomination/ Affiliation	Grade	Notes	Refs
St George's Church (More images)		Arreton; 50.6781°N 1.2449°W	Anglican	I	"One of the most remarkable churches on the island", this church retains some Saxon-era fabric but was extended and rebuilt in the mid-13th century. A humble exterior, characterised by the squat tower and catslide roofs, gives way to a lofty and high-quality interior with a twin-aisled nave and a narrower chancel with side chapel. The fixtures and furnishings date mostly from an 1886 restoration by Ewan Christian. Four of the bells in the tower are 15th- or 16th-century.	
Arreton Methodist Church (More images)		Arreton; 50.6714°N 1.2339°W	Methodist	–	Originally a Bible Christian chapel, this brick church has stood on the main road outside Arreton village since 1866. It was extended in 1879 and was registered for marriages in November 1895. An earlier school chapel named Ebenezer served Bible Christians from 1846.	
St Paul's Church (More images)		Barton, Newport; 50.7025°N 1.2847°W	Anglican	II	The village (now a suburb of Newport) was originally within the parish of Whippingham, and Barton was an ecclesiastical district within it until it was given its own parish in 1844. In that year James William Wild designed the present church, a Romanesque Revival building of rough limestone blocks laid in courses. There is a corner tower (more Gothic Revival in style), the chancel has a rounded apse and the nave has aisles on both sides. The rounded lancet windows at the west end have stained glass of 1897 and 1899 by Charles Eamer Kempe. The 400-capacity church cost £2,040 and was funded by subscriptions and donations.	
Holy Trinity Church (More images)		Bembridge; 50.6901°N 1.0905°W	Anglican	II	The first church in this village—usually attributed to John Nash, although some sources name Portsmouth architect Jacob Owen—dated from 1827 and was a plain Gothic Revival building. Structurally unsound, it was replaced 19 years later by Thomas Hellyer's church of Swanage stone, which consists of a five-bay nave, chancel, spire-topped tower with three bells and a clock, and an aisle and side chapel on the south side. Bath stonework dominates the interior. The church was consecrated on 22 July 1846.	
St Luke's Mission Church (More images)		Bembridge; 50.6866°N 1.0811°W	Anglican	–	The building dates from 1887 and is a chapel of ease to Holy Trinity Church. It is set within a cemetery which has been used for burials within the parish since Holy Trinity's churchyard became full.	
Bembridge Methodist Church (More images)		Bembridge; 50.6872°N 1.0836°W	Methodist	–	The present church dates from 1934 (it was registered for marriages in June of that year) and replaced the former Wesleyan chapel on Kings Road. Although registered for marriages only in 1922, this could trace its origins back to 1844.	
St Michael's Church (More images)		Bembridge; 50.6856°N 1.0815°W	Roman Catholic	–	Catholic worship in the area can be traced back to 1842 in various private chapels in nearby St Helens (one of which was owned by William Ewart Gladstone's sister). When the 1844 Wesleyan Methodist chapel in Bembridge closed down, it was converted into a Catholic church and was used for 30 years until the present building was erected at a cost of £12,000 on a site in Walls Road. It opened on 20 June 1965 and was registered for marriages in December 1978. Designed in a simple modern style by Cyril A.F. Sheppard of Ryde, it is a plain rectangular church with no interior divisions, portal-framed with red brick and some stone cladding. Renovation work was carried out in 1990.	
Holy Cross Church (More images)		Binstead; 50.7320°N 1.1863°W	Anglican	II	The church has extensive herringbone brickwork, suggesting an early Norman date, and it was built c. 1150 for workers at the nearby limestone quarries. The nave was rebuilt to the design of Thomas Hellyer in 1845, though, at a cost of £1,800. The "sophisticated" lancet windows date from the 13th century. Some of the internal features were moved here from Winchester College Chapel after it was refitted in 1932, and the nave and some fittings had to be repaired in 1969 after a fire.	
Binstead Methodist Church (More images)		Binstead; 50.7264°N 1.1884°W	Methodist	–	A Wesleyan congregation met in Binstead from 1866, when a small chapel (now the church hall) was built. The present church, adjacent to the earlier building, was erected in 1889 and was registered for marriages in August 1934.	
Abbey Church of Our Lady of Quarr (More images)		Binstead; 50.7314°N 1.2042°W	Roman Catholic	I	The original Cistercian abbey, founded in 1131, is now ruined. Its modern successor was established nearby in 1907 adjacent to Quarr Abbey House, a Victorian mansion next to the ruins which was bought by Benedictine monks from Solesmes Abbey. Paul Bellot, a member of this order who was also an architect, designed the church—"his outstanding achievement", and a highly original (and rare in England) example of Expressionist architecture—in 1911–12. Built of rough, pale red Belgian bricks inside and out, it is a very tall and long building, "dramatic" in its appearance and demonstrating "exceptional innovation [and] originality".	
St Boniface Church (More images)		Bonchurch; 50.6001°N 1.1868°W	Anglican	II	Like the earlier church in the south-coast village, this Victorian church bears a rare dedication to Saint Boniface. Designed in 1847–48 by Benjamin Ferrey, the style lies between Early English Gothic Revival and Romanesque Revival. The "solemn but quite large" building has transects and is topped with a bell-cot rather than having a tower or spire. The main material is ashlar. The East Windows were designed by William Wailes and other fine stained glass. The church cost £2,845.3s.9d. and was consecrated on 11 December 1848.	
St Mary the Virgin's Church (More images)		Brading; 50.6824°N 1.1427°W	Anglican	I	This "impressive" and large church serves the formerly important port of Brading and a vast parish covering the east of the island. There are many monuments to the Oglander baronets of Nunwell House, principally in the south (or Oglander) chapel. The west tower is raised on four piers with an entrance below. Inside, the appearance is largely 12th-century, although the north and south chapels date from the 15th century. The aisles flanking the nave have five-bay arcades in a style characteristic of several churches on the island.	
Brading Methodist Church (More images)		Brading; 50.6847°N 1.3252°W	Methodist	–	This chapel dates from 1867 and was built for Bible Christians, succeeding the Salem Chapel of 1844 and another place of worship ("Warder's Chapel") which occupied a rented building. In May 2016, the church was damaged when a car in the adjacent car park caught fire and the flames spread to the side of the building.	
St Mary the Virgin's Church (More images)		Brighstone; 50.6424°N 1.3945°W	Anglican	I	Only the arcade in the north aisle (which was otherwise restored in 1852, along with the rest of the north side, by the rector Edward McAll) survives from the 12th-century church in this village in the southwest. The tower, of mixed stonework and with battlements and a short lead-covered spire, is of various dates between the 13th and 15th centuries, and other parts of the building are mainly of this period. "A remarkable series" of stained glass from the late 19th century was executed by various designers.	
Brighstone Methodist Church (More images)		Brighstone; 50.6414°N 1.3971°W	Methodist	–	This is the modern successor to the former chapel at Hunnyhill, which served Methodists (originally Bible Christians) from 1837 until 1999. In the latter year the present building was opened on New Road to replace it. The church was registered for marriages in March 2000.	
St Mary the Virgin's Church (More images)		Brook; 50.6579°N 1.4430°W	Anglican	II	The church, which stands on a high, steeply sloping knoll, burnt down in 1862 or 1863 and was rebuilt to the present Early English Gothic Revival design by Willoughby Mullins in 1864. Parts of the tower, including its integral porch, survived but have been altered; in particular, the tower was given a new upper stage and shingled spire in 1889. There are no aisles, but a side chapel on the north side was probably a mid-18th-century addition by the Lord of the manor. The nave and chancel are not separated structurally.	
All Saints Church (More images)		Calbourne; 50.6772°N 1.3998°W	Anglican	II*	A church existed here at the time of the Domesday survey but has been altered several times since, and is now a "complex" building of various dates. The "elaborate" Norman-style porch is in fact Victorian, part of A. F. Livesay's restoration which began in 1836, but genuinely older are the stone and flint chancel and nave (both 13th-century), the tower (rebuilt from ruins in 1752) and the windows. The chapel on the north side was rebuilt by Livesay in 1842 for the Lords of Swainston Manor. Its vaulted and arcaded interior was mostly removed during alterations in the 1970s.	
St Mary the Virgin's Church (More images)		Carisbrooke; 50.6919°N 1.3138°W	Anglican	I	The Victoria County History states that St Mary's "ranks first in importance" among the island's parish churches, standing high above the village street as a "worthy" accompaniment to the nearby castle. Carisbrooke was associated with the priory at Lire in France, and the church (successor to another which stood on an unknown site in the vast parish) was conventual as well as a parish church. The small monastic buildings were demolished in the 16th century, at the same time as the chancel. Parts of the nave walls date from the 12th century, when the church was founded, the tall tower is 15th-century and the king post roof is also old. The church held the burial rights for Newport's residents for many years.	
St Nicholas-in-Castro Church (More images)		Carisbrooke; 50.6873°N 1.3138°W	Anglican	–	This chapel within the castle grounds existed by the 11th century but was destroyed and rebuilt during Lord Lymington's restoration work of 1738. It was in ruins by 1856, but in 1904–06 local architect Percy Stone rebuilt it in Gothic Revival style. It now serves as a public place of worship, and in 1919 it was further altered by Stone to serve as a war memorial and to commemorate King Charles I, whose statue stands inside the "lavish" interior. The chapel is a simple rectangular building in the Perpendicular Gothic Revival style.	
Wayfarers Fellowship (More images)		Carisbrooke; 50.6908°N 1.3132°W	Evangelical	–	A Primitive Methodist chapel was built on this site in 1859 and stood here until 1932. The present building has been used since 1950 by an Evangelical group which was founded 14 years earlier.	
Verbum Dei Retreat (St Dominic's Priory)		Carisbrooke; 50.6862°N 1.3054°W	Non-denominational	–	This building was an outhouse of the Catholic St Dominic's Priory complex from 1866 until 1989. It is now home to a community of Catholic nuns from the Verbum Dei missionary fraternity who run a retreat centre. The rest of the priory was purchased by Protestant group in 1993 and is now known as Carisbrooke Priory, and operated as a Christian healing centre with the old priory chapel being registered for worship as a non-denominational Christian church and marriages in August 2004.	
St Andrew's Church (More images)		Chale; 50.5958°N 1.3185°W	Anglican	II*	Nothing survives on this high, "bleak", rural site from the first chapel, founded in 1114. The present exterior appearance is Perpendicular Gothic, particularly the two-stage west tower (which has two inscribed bells of the 14th and 17th centuries). The chancel was extended, and a new chancel arch formed, in 1872. There is some stained glass by Charles Eamer Kempe.	
Holy Trinity Church (More images)		Cowes; 50.7660°N 1.3023°W	Anglican	II	This Gothic Revival church was designed in 1832 by a Portsmouth architect, Benjamin Bramble, and stands on a hillside behind the foreshore. Yellow stock brickwork is used throughout. A chancel with a semicircular apse was built in 1862 to the design of R.J. Jones, whose other island work includes the church at Swanmore and a rebuilding of Kingston's church. The west tower has a battlemented upper stage, and a timber gallery survives inside.	
St Faith's Church (More images)		Cowes; 50.7542°N 1.2984°W	Anglican (Note: Anglican services are no longer held there.)	II	The reinforced concrete arches in this church in the south of town are among the earliest examples of this construction feature. The church dates from 1909 and was designed by J. Standen Atkins. It replaced a temporary building on the same site, but is of a smaller and simpler design than originally intended because not enough money could be raised. For example, a two-storey chancel was planned for the east end of the steeply sloping site. The exterior walls are roughcast and there is no tower or spire—merely a turret on the gable end with twin bell-openings. Although broadly Gothic Revival in style, it exhibits features of the functional Vernacular style of Charles Voysey.	
St Mary the Virgin's Church (More images)		Cowes; 50.7630°N 1.3019°W	Anglican	II*	An Anglican chapel was built in Cowes in 1657, attributed to Joseph Richards. John Nash designed the "radically Grecian [Classical]" tower at the west end in 1815–16, and only this part survived the wholesale reconstruction carried out in 1867 to the design of Arthur Cates. The chancel and apse were further rebuilt in 1900 by H. Lloyd. The church has the mausoleum of the Ward family of neighbouring Northwood House (George Ward was a friend of John Nash and a benefactor of the church). The multicoloured brick interior contrasts with the rough stonework of the exterior.	
Victoria Road Chapel (More images)		Cowes; 50.7590°N 1.3020°W	Baptist	–	Nikolaus Pevsner considered this "a more elaborate version" of the nearby West Hill Primitive Methodist chapel, now the town library. It was built between 1876 and 1877 in a Classical style with pilasters of the Composite order supporting a large, shallow pediment. The building is of buff-coloured brick with details picked out in stucco and red-brick arches above the door and windows. The chapel was registered for marriages in April 1880 and is now known as Cowes Baptist Church.	
The Community Church – IoW (More images)		Cowes; 50.7582°N 1.2945°W	Evangelical	–	This building was originally an Anglican mission hall dedicated to St Andrew and served by the parish church, St Mary's. It was active from the 1880s until the 1920s (a datestone on the entrance porch shows 1886) and was later used as a hall by the local community. An Evangelical congregation now occupies the building, which is known as St Andrew's Christian Centre.	
Cowes Methodist Church (More images)		Cowes; 50.7599°N 1.2965°W	Methodist	–	The church, which seats 750 people, replaced the 550-capacity Wesleyan chapel diagonally opposite (now Alexandra Hall) and opened in June 1901 with the name Victoria Wesleyan Church. It was registered for marriages in the same month. It was named after Queen Victoria, who donated £20 towards the £9,000 cost. It is a red-brick and pale stone building in the Perpendicular Gothic Revival style with a "graceful" three-stage octagonal corner tower topped by a decorative parapet and a short spire. The architects were the firm of Bell, Withers and Meredith. The church hall behind was demolished in 1992.	
Victoria Hall (More images)		Cowes; 50.7542°N 1.2969°W	Plymouth Brethren	–	This has been registered as a Brethren meeting room since June 1958.	
St Thomas of Canterbury's Church (More images)		Cowes; 50.7625°N 1.2992°W	Roman Catholic	II	"Of great historical importance" for its early date—it was built five years after the Roman Catholic Relief Act 1791 permitted Catholic chapels to be opened and registered—this Georgian building was altered in the Victorian era (partly because of damage caused by a tornado), the 1970s and the 1990s, but retains a tall Classical reredos. Pale brown brick, tall arched windows and an Ionic porch characterise the exterior. The architect was the first priest, Rev. Thomas Gabb, and John Young was the builder. The cost of £2,808.9s.8d. was met by Elizabeth Heneage.	
Cowes National Spiritualist Church (More images)		Cowes; 50.7573°N 1.2975°W	Spiritualist	–	The history of Spiritualist worship in Cowes goes back to the 1930s, when a former Primitive Methodist chapel (now demolished) was converted into a church for the congregation. In 1955 they moved to a new building on the road to Newport (registered for marriages in August 1955), which was in turn demolished in 2011 and replaced with the present structure.	
St James's Church (More images)		East Cowes; 50.7579°N 1.2858°W	Anglican	II	John Nash, who designed the original church here and lived at East Cowes Castle, is buried in the churchyard with his wife. Nash's building of 1831–33 (described by Sir John Summerson as "excessively plain Gothic"), whose foundation stone was laid by Princess Victoria just before she became Queen, was comprehensively enlarged and redesigned between 1868 and 1870 by Thomas Hellyer in an unconventional interpretation of the Gothic Revival style. The tower was retained, however, the and Nash tomb is next to its base.	
East Cowes Methodist Church (More images)		East Cowes; 50.7535°N 1.2869°W	Methodist	–	This building dates from 1878, but there was a 140-capacity Wesleyan Methodist chapel in the parish of Whippingham (of which East Cowes was part) from 1850. It was registered for marriages in February 1893.	
Clarence Road Evangelical Church (More images)		East Cowes; 50.7556°N 1.2888°W	Open Brethren	–	For many years this church was called Berachah Gospel Hall. A church has stood here since the mid-19th century: until World War II it was a Bible Christian Methodist chapel, but it was nearly destroyed by bombs and was rebuilt for a new congregation—for whom it was registered in November 1952.	
St David's Church (More images)		East Cowes; 50.7539°N 1.2828°W	Roman Catholic	–	This is the third Catholic church in East Cowes, all of which have occupied the present site in Connaught Road. A tin tabernacle was used between 1906 and 1923, then a brick replacement was built. This was bombed in 1942, and Cyril A.F. Sheppard of Ryde designed its replacement in 1951–52 (a temporary church erected in 1945 by a Newport builder was incorporated into the new church). The walls are of red brick, the roof is tiled and the simple rectangular interior has concrete roof trusses and a gallery.	
All Saints Church (More images)		Freshwater; 50.6844°N 1.5102°W	Anglican	II*	The ancient parish church looks over the old village centre from the northeast and has the River Yar estuary to its rear. The tall battlemented tower, flanked by north and south aisles, dominates the west end. W.T. Stratton's restoration and extension work of 1875–76 gives way to a mostly 13th-century interior. Many fittings are ancient, but a "strongly realistic" bust of longtime Freshwater resident Alfred, Lord Tennyson was installed in 1992 in a 13th-century tomb recess.	
Rectory Chapel (More images)		Freshwater; 50.6799°N 1.5178°W	Anglican	L	The chapel, which holds weekday Anglican services within the parish of Freshwater (also covering All Saints and St Agnes' churches), is part of a complex which includes the parish hall and which was originally a 17th-century or earlier tithe barn. The chapel section, built entirely of stone, may have been erected later in the 17th century and was altered in the Victorian era.	
St Agnes' Church (More images)		Freshwater; 50.6731°N 1.5174°W	Anglican	II	Located at Freshwater Bay, this was initially a chapel of ease to All Saints Church. The street frontage is "contrivedly picturesque" but the rest of the stone-built apse-ended chapel is much simpler. The roof is thatched. Architect Isaac Jones designed the church in 1908, reusing stone from a demolished farmhouse.	
Colwell Baptist Church (More images)		Freshwater; 50.6877°N 1.5326°W	Baptist	–	This chapel was founded by worshippers who seceded from a nearby Particular Baptist church. Built in 1836 (although the congregation assembled from 1830) and known as Ebenezer Chapel for many years, it is a simple white-painted building, long and low-set and built parallel to the road, with an attached graveyard. The roof is of slate. The three-bay façade dates from the late 19th century, when an extra bay was added on the north side. The marriage registration dates from May 1922.	
Freshwater Methodist Church (More images)		Freshwater; 50.6820°N 1.5245°W	Methodist	–	The first Methodist chapel in Freshwater was named Providence Chapel and was built in 1824 for Wesleyans. This was replaced by a new chapel, Wesley Hall, in 1959. Nearby Totland Methodist Church closed in 2010, and a planning application to demolish the chapel at Freshwater and replace it with a new church serving both congregations was approved in February 2012. Work on the first phase was completed in 2014 at a cost of £450,000, the new church opened on 20 September 2014, and in February 2015 it was registered for marriages.	
St Olave's Church (More images)		Gatcombe; 50.6634°N 1.3046°W	Anglican	I	The parish church of the hamlet of Gatcombe has a small, mostly 13th-century nave, a "grand" tower of the 15th century (similar to that at St Mary's Church, Carisbrooke) and a rebuilt Gothic Revival chancel (Richard J. Jones carried out this work in 1864–65). The nave has "handsome" 15th-century windows, and the medieval and 19th-century stained glass throughout the church is of very high quality.	
All Saints Church (More images)		Godshill; 50.6337°N 1.2558°W	Anglican	I	Largely a product of the 15th century—only a fragment of walling in the aisle survives from the 13th-century building—this church has an unusual layout. The nave and chancel are of similar length and have no structural division; alongside runs a full-length aisle of the same width, effectively forming a second nave, separated by an arcade of six bays and with a small tower at the west end; and there are transepts and a south porch. The church stands on high ground overlooking the village.	
Godshill Methodist Church (More images)		Godshill; 50.6327°N 1.2524°W	Methodist	II	A minimalist Gothic Revival "box" of 1838, the chapel (formerly Wesleyan, as shown on an oval datestone above the porch; click for image) has a symmetrical façade with a gabled roof and porch and lancet windows with y-tracery. Local stone and ashlar are the main building materials. The religious census of 1851 noted that the capacity was 190 and that 70 sittings were free.	
Carisbrooke and Gunville Methodist Church (More images)		Gunville; 50.6989°N 1.3215°W	Methodist	–	A chapel for Wesleyans was founded in Gunville "before 1815" and was served from Newport. Nearby stood chapels for Primitive Methodists and Bible Christian Methodists. None of these buildings survive; the present church dates from 1907 and replaced the original Bible Christian church. A foundation stone (image) dated 17 November 1906 records the architect as S.E. Tomkins. The chapel was registered for marriages in January 1957.	
All Saints Church (More images)		Gurnard; 50.7545°N 1.3200°W	Anglican	–	This church was originally in the parish of Holy Trinity Church, Cowes. Designed in 1892–93 by the architect E.P. Loftus Brock, it is built of local buff-coloured brick with some red-brick detailing and Bath stonework, and has a simple nave–chancel–transepts layout and an east-end spire. The windows are lancets. Inside, there is multicoloured brickwork and an "intricate" stained glass window of 1911 by A. L. Moore and Son.	
St Peter's Church (More images)		Havenstreet; 50.7097°N 1.2064°W	Anglican	II	The village is mostly Victorian—John Rylands was a major benefactor—and the church dates from 1852. Thomas Hellyer designed it with his characteristic narrow lancet windows using rough-hewn limestone from the local area. There is no tower or spire—only a bell-cot—and the church lacks aisles or transepts. The parish was created one year after the church opened. The architecture of the "delightfully scaled" church is Early English Gothic Revival.	
Church of The Good Shepherd (More images)		Lake; 50.6464°N 1.1682°W	Anglican	II	The permanent church to serve this suburban area between Sandown and Shanklin was built between 1892 and 1894 to a "very unusual" Decorated Gothic design by Temple Moore. It replaced a tin tabernacle of 1876. The twin-gabled double nave faces the street, and there is a bell-cot but no tower or spire. The small chancel has a Lady chapel to the side. Prominent between the two naves is a single-storey porch with the inscription The Good Shepherd giveth His Life for the sheep. Francis Skeat designed the stained glass.	
Kingdom Hall (More images)		Lake; 50.6501°N 1.1742°W	Jehovah's Witnesses	–	This Kingdom Hall was registered for marriages in June 1991.	
Lake Methodist Church (More images)		Lake; 50.6469°N 1.1681°W	Methodist	–	The first Methodist chapel in Lake was built for Bible Christians in 1877 when the village was still part of the parish of Brading. It still stands, but became the church hall when the present church was built in front of it in 1955. It was registered for marriages in 1956.	
Lake Green Christian Mission (More images)		Lake; 50.6507°N 1.1699°W	Open Brethren	–	This church originated as a non-denominational Sunday school meeting which took place in a garage. A church was founded in the 1970s, and a building at the corner of Percy and Lake Green Roads, previously registered for Exclusive Brethren between 1955 and 1971, was acquired. It was registered under its present name in April 1978.	
St Peter and St Paul's Church (More images)		Mottistone; 50.6518°N 1.4277°W	Anglican	I	Brian de Lisle (Brian de Insula) of Mottistone built the original church in the 12th century, but minimal fabric remains from that era. There are 15th- and 16th-century additions, and the whole building was restored in 1863 by Willoughby Mullins. As part of this work, the chancel was re-roofed using timbers from a recently wrecked ship. The low 15th-century tower is of "small slate-like stones" quarried locally. The tower originally had a broach spire.	
All Saints Church (More images)		Newchurch; 50.6669°N 1.2063°W	Anglican	I	The large, ancient cruciform church stands on high ground at the north end of the village, and originally served a vast parish stretching from the north coast to the south. The largely 13th-century building still has traces of 12th-century work, and additions were made at regular intervals after that (the aisles were rebuilt, the chancel was lengthened and the tower was heightened).	
Langbridge Congregational Church (More images)		Newchurch; 50.6703°N 1.2102°W	Congregational	L	This dates from 1845 and was linked to the Congregational chapel (now demolished) at George Street in Ryde in its early years. Its simple layout and single-hall interior "reflects the Congregationalist [chapel] design" of the 19th century, being plain and "visually unobtrusive". The chapel is set in a garden and retains original features including a stained glass window. It was registered for marriages in July 1949.	
St Thomas's Minster (More images)		Newport; 50.6998°N 1.2937°W	Anglican	I	The "fine building" of 1854 by Samuel Daukes, "whose lofty tower dominates the town", replaced the original late-12th-century church dedicated to St Thomas of Canterbury. The tall west tower and five-bay nave lead to a chancel with side chapels, one of which contains Queen Victoria's memorial to Princess Elizabeth (d. 1650), designed by Carlo Marochetti. The rebuilt church was reconsecrated in 1857, three years after Prince Albert laid the foundation stone.	
St John the Baptist's Church (More images)		Newport; 50.6960°N 1.2955°W	Anglican	II	Designed in an early (pre-Ecclesiological Society) form of Gothic Revival, this tall, rectangular church dates from 1837 and was parished that year. The parish, formed from Carisbrooke's territory, was known as Nodehill in reference to the area of Newport outside the ancient town centre. R.G. Wetten was the architect. There is no tower or spire, and the six-bay nave dominates the church; the chancel is small in comparison. On the west end, one bay projects to form a porch as high as the church itself.	
Castlehold Baptist Church (More images)		Newport; 50.6990°N 1.2986°W	Baptist	II	Particular Baptists met in the town in the 18th century, but the cause died out until a new congregation was formed in 1809 by seceders from the General Baptist (now Unitarian) church. They built the present chapel in 1812, but its Classical appearance dates from an 1872 rebuild. A three-bay pediment spans the centre of the five-bay façade, which is demarcated by Corinthian columns. The main material is yellow brick. Work took place to renovate the interior in 1982.	
Newport Congregational Church (More images)		Newport; 50.6991°N 1.2973°W	Congregational Federation	–	Nonconformist worship began in Newport soon after the Act of Uniformity 1662. Between 1699 and 1704, a chapel was built on the present High Street; this was replaced by one on St James's Street in 1777, and another (Independent in character) was opened on the same street in 1848. At the creation of the United Reformed Church in 1972 the trustees decided to retain the church's independence as a Congregational church. The 1848 chapel was sold in 2000 and became a pub, land on Pyle Street was bought in 2002 and planning permission for the present church building was granted in 2006. The building was completed in 2011.	
Church on the Roundabout (More images)		Newport; 50.7009°N 1.2891°W	Elim Pentecostal	–	Between March 1935 and April 1977 Bethany Hall on the major Coppins Bridge roundabout was registered for worship by Open Brethren. It has been registered for its present Pentecostal congregation since March 1995.	
Kingdom Hall (More images)		Newport; 50.6975°N 1.2687°W	Jehovah's Witnesses	–	The building was erected in 2003 for Plymouth Brethren and was registered for their use (as the Buckbury Lane Meeting Room) in October of that year. By 2008 it was no longer required and was acquired by Jehovah's Witnesses to serve as a Kingdom Hall for the Newport–Wootton and Newport–Cowes congregations of that group. It is a simple building of red and buff-coloured brick. It was re-registered for marriages as a Kingdom Hall in April 2009.	
Newport Methodist Church (More images)		Newport; 50.7009°N 1.2930°W	Methodist	–	Zion Chapel, the first Bible Christian Methodist church in Newport, was superseded by this building on the same road in 1879. The "interesting design" by Frederick Mew was described by Pevsner as "wildly Gothic ... [and] acceptably incongruous in this varied street". The church, which was registered for marriages in April 1880, has also been known as Quay Street Methodist Church.	
Newport Mosque (More images)		Newport; 50.6981°N 1.2959°W	Muslim	–	The mosque is also known as the Isle of Wight Jame-e-Mosque Islamic Community Centre and has a capacity of 175 worshippers.	
Bethany Evangelical Church (More images)		Newport; 50.6973°N 1.2961°W	Open Brethren	–	Successor to the nearby Bethany Hall (now the Pentecostal Church on the Roundabout), this church was registered for marriages in October 1975.	
Quaker Meeting Rooms		Newport; 50.7020°N 1.2922°W	Quaker	–	Quakerism has an unbroken 350-year history on the island. The congregation had moved to small premises on Crocker Street in the 1950s, but since the summer of 1997 they have met in a worship space which is part of the Quay Arts Centre, a collection of 18th- and 19th-century red-brick warehouses of irregular design and layout which were extended and unified in 1997–98 to the design of Tony Fretton Architects. Quakers signed a lease agreement on the old "rope store" part of the complex in January 1997.	
St Thomas of Canterbury's Church (More images)		Newport; 50.6989°N 1.2975°W	Roman Catholic	II*	Like the slightly later church of the same dedication in Cowes, this church of 1791 was commissioned and funded by Elizabeth Heneage. Although a "plain brick building", it is of "outstanding interest" because it is the first public Roman Catholic church built in England since the Reformation: the Roman Catholic Relief Act was passed earlier that year. The red-brick exterior has two sets of round-arched windows; some on the street façade are blank, and at the top is a brick pediment with an oculus. A Tuscan-columned white stone porch with a dentilled pediment protrudes from the front.	
Salvation Army Hall (More images)		Newport; 50.6988°N 1.2967°W	Salvation Army	–	This hall on Pyle Street was built as a chapel for Primitive Methodists but has been used by The Salvation Army since 1935 or 1936 (it was registered for marriages in December of that year). Two previous halls, both on Lugley Street, were used by the community between 1891 and 1927 and between 1927 and 1935 respectively.	
Newport Unitarian Chapel (More images)		Newport; 50.7002°N 1.2909°W	Unitarian	II	A General Baptist congregation became established in the town in 1726 and built its first chapel two years later. The present building dates from 1774, although its appearance is more 19th-century: a result of rebuilding and enlarging in 1825, which gave it a "large Victorian schoolroom" to the rear and a vaguely Gothic Revival façade with Classical features such as a large brick pediment and patterned frieze. The contemporary wooden galleries survive inside. The church adopted a Unitarian character by the early 19th century, leading to the secession of some members to form the present Castlehold Baptist Church.	
True Vine Church		Newport 50.7003°N 1.2927°W	Non-denominational	–	True Vine Church opened in Newport High Street in April 2017 in the upper floors of the building that was formerly the Picturedrome cinema until its closure in 2000. The building was renovated to house a large modern auditorium providing a place of worship that can accommodate approximately 300 people. The lower part of the building is currently occupied by the Stonegate Pub Company.	
Church of the Holy Spirit (More images)		Newtown; 50.7143°N 1.4033°W	Anglican	II	The important medieval port of Newtown has vanished: only a few cottages survive. The original church, St Mary Magdalene's, fell into a ruinous state and was rebuilt in 1835 in the Early English Gothic Revival style to the design of A. F. Livesay. It was rededicated to the Holy Spirit when it opened. There is no spire or tower, but the west and east ends have, respectively, a bell-cot and "pretentious crocketed pinnacles". There is extensive plasterwork inside the aisleless nave.	
St John the Baptist's Church (More images)		Niton; 50.5885°N 1.2876°W	Anglican	II*	This partly late-12th-century church (evidence of this is visible in the north arcade) is built of sandstone and has a heavily buttressed tower, possibly dating from the 17th century, and short spire of stone. Although restored in 1864 by local architect R.J. Jones, much medieval work remains, although many of the lancet windows are Victorian. Percy Stone designed the "elaborate" painted reredos in 1930.	
St Catherine's Chapel (Niton Baptist Church) (More images)		Niton; 50.5852°N 1.2865°W	Baptist	II	Stone from the area, laid roughly in courses, was used to build this simple l-shaped Gothic Revival chapel, which replaces an older chapel (opened in 1823) which was originally a malt house. The windows are lancets and set within architraves, and there is a gabled entrance porch. The 230-capacity chapel opened in 1849, although the Victoria County History gives a date of 1847.	
Niton Methodist Church (More images)		Niton; 50.5895°N 1.2843°W	Methodist	–	Niton's Wesleyan Methodist chapel was built in 1864 and was registered for marriages in October 1925.	
St John the Baptist's Church (More images)		Northwood; 50.7341°N 1.3016°W	Anglican	I	Although it later became the centre of a large parish, Northwood village was originally within Carisbrooke for ecclesiastical purposes, and its 12th-century church remained a chapelry of that parish until the mid-16th century. Although the tower and spire—the most visible features of the church when entering the large churchyard—date from a restoration in 1864, most of the building retains its 12th- and 13th-century appearance and form, giving a "strongly medieval character". The elaborately carved arched doorway has the chevron moulding characteristic of the Norman era. The original tower had been a "strangely squat wooden" structure.	
St John's Church (More images)		Oakfield, Ryde; 50.7233°N 1.1478°W	Anglican	II	This Gothic Revival church cost £1,600 and was consecrated in 1843. It was originally a chapel of ease within St Helens parish, although Ryde's suburban growth soon surrounded it. Thomas Hellyer, who had designed the Gothic Revival chapel, accordingly extended and remodelled it as a cruciform structure in 1870. A Lady chapel was added in 1914 to commemorate Somerset Gough-Calthorpe, 7th Baron Calthorpe, and in 1954 the chancel was extended further.	
Rookley Methodist Church (More images)		Rookley; 50.6545°N 1.2836°W	Methodist	–	The chapel was built in 1859 for Bible Christians, although meetings had taken place since 1848. It is of stone rubble with a slate roof, a three-bay façade with tall pointed-arched windows flanking a door under a similar arch, and a steep gable topped by a spherical finial. It was one of numerous Nonconformist chapels in the large parish of Arreton. Under its present name of Rookley Methodist Church it was registered for marriages in May 1955. The organ was donated by Buckland Methodist Church in Portsmouth after that chapel closed in 1971.	
All Saints Church (More images)		Ryde; 50.7274°N 1.1670°W	Anglican	II*	George Gilbert Scott designed Ryde's new parish church between 1869 and 1872; it took over this role from St Thomas's Church. A large, prominently situated Decorated Gothic Revival building, its tall northeast tower and steeple (built in 1881–82 to the design of John Oldrid Scott) is a landmark in the town and is visible from the mainland. The stone- and ashlar-built church has an aisled nave, chancel and an apsidal vestry—a later addition (1891–92) by C. Pemberton Leach. The High Victorian appearance of the exterior is carried through into the elaborate interior. The "specially lavish [architectural] treatment" was possible because the church was funded by the Royal Victoria Yacht Club of Ryde to commemorate Queen Victoria's husband Prince Albert.	
St James's Church (More images)		Ryde; 50.7301°N 1.1654°W	Anglican	II	This was built between 1827 and 1829 as a proprietary chapel and designed by London architect Greenway Robins in a pre-Ecclesiological Gothic Revival (i.e. prior to the influence of the Cambridge Camden Society on church architecture). Its exterior was drastically altered in the 1960s by R.P. Thomas, and when its bell-cot was removed later it left the church resembling a plain, low hall. The early 19th-century galleried interior survives, though. The church is now affiliated with the Anglican Mission in England, a group associated with the Anglican realignment movement.	
Ryde Baptist Church (More images)		Ryde; 50.7291°N 1.1618°W	Baptist	–	The church was founded on 9 October 1862 with the name Christ Church and was registered for marriages with that name in 1866—although disagreements in that year led some members to secede and found a separate church which survived until 1912. Architect Francis Newman used the Gothic Revival style for the town-centre chapel, and the buff- and red-brick façade facing George Street is dominated by a large window with tracery. There was a tall corner spire, but in 1925 it had to be shortened because of structural problems. Woodworm, fire and a lightning strike also damaged the building at various times. In 2004 the ground floor was converted into a community centre; worship takes place on a newly created upper floor.	
Ryde Elim Church (More images)		Ryde; 50.7251°N 1.1613°W	Elim Pentecostal	–	Ryde's Pentecostal church is on Albert Street and was registered for marriages in March 1979.	
Grace Church IoW (More images)		Ryde; 50.7193°N 1.1459°W	Evangelical	–	A Congregational chapel opened at Marlborough Road in the Elmfield suburb of Ryde in 1870 and was registered for marriages in May 1934. After the building fell out of use it was bought by an Evangelical group which established Grace Church IoW here and in another chapel in nearby Seaview. The building was renovated and extended at the front in 2016–17 (click for May 2016 image).	
Ryde Methodist Church (More images)		Ryde; 50.7295°N 1.1646°W	Methodist	–	A Wesleyan chapel was established in 1845 on Nelson Street, but the present building on Garfield Road dates from 1883 and was registered for marriages in August of that year. In the 20th century it superseded the former United Methodist and Primitive Methodist chapels in the town. Architect Charles Bell designed the church, which has a "striking main front" with a large rose window set within an arched surround, a gabled roof and semicircular arched openings. The central entrance has twin doors under a separate arch and shallow gable.	
St Cecilia's Abbey (More images)		Ryde; 50.7287°N 1.1465°W	Roman Catholic	L	The Benedictine abbey was founded in 1882 and is home to nuns belonging to the Solesmes Congregation. Daily public Masses are offered in the chapel, which is administered as part of the Catholic parish of Ryde. Parts of the "fine yellow-brick property" date from the mid-18th century.	
St Mary's Church (More images)		Ryde; 50.7267°N 1.1626°W	Roman Catholic	II*	St Mary's Church was founded by Elizabeth, Countess of Clare (wife of John FitzGibbon, 2nd Earl of Clare), who converted to Catholicism in 1841; a stained glass window of c. 1880 commemorates her. Joseph Hansom designed the building between 1846 and 1848, and it was registered for marriages in the latter year. A "rogue Gothic" design with a "vigorous" and intricate asymmetrical street frontage, it cost £18,000 and was extended several times in the 19th century. Apart from this, the church has seen minimal external alteration since it was built. Nathaniel Westlake executed a scheme of wall paintings in 1894 and also painted the Stations of the Cross. A consecration ceremony took place on 21 May 1863.	
Ryde Spiritualist Church (More images)		Ryde; 50.7271°N 1.1590°W	Spiritualist	–	Regular services are held at this church, which is part of the Spiritualists' National Union and which was registered for marriages in November 1972.	
Ryde United Reformed Church (More images)		Ryde; 50.7195°N 1.1732°W	United Reformed Church	–	There were Congregational chapels in George Street in the town centre (1870, by local architect R. J. Jones) and the suburbs of Haylands (1850) and Elmfield (1870). When the United Reformed Church was formed in 1974, the George Street and Haylands churches merged, both chapels were closed and a new church was built close to the Haylands site. This was registered for marriages in December 1974. The town centre chapel's demolition has been described as "a serious loss to Ryde's townscape and skyline": its steep spire was a landmark.	
St Helen's Church (More images)		St Helens; 50.7061°N 1.1150°W	Anglican	II	The original church stood by the sea but declined into a ruinous state. Only its tower remains, structurally enhanced to serve as a sea mark. In 1717 this replacement church was built inland, but the appearance is largely 19th-century: it was redesigned between 1829 and 1833 and a chancel was added 31 years later. The nave has transepts but no aisles, and the lancet windows contain y-tracery. The lychgate at the entrance to the churchyard dates from 1920.	
St Catherine-by-the-Green Church (More images)		St Helens; 50.6989°N 1.1085°W	Anglican	–	This building is a combined church and community centre, built in 1992 on the site of a tin tabernacle which had previously been used for Anglican services and a neighbouring Church Institute hall. The tin tabernacle had been in use since 1905 as a chapel of ease to St Helen's Church and was second-hand: it was moved to St Helens from a former college in Ryde.	
St Lawrence's Church (More images)		St Lawrence; 50.5865°N 1.2419°W	Anglican	II*	A late work by Giles Gilbert Scott, this church replaced the small medieval chapel nearby, which still stands. There is no tower or spire, only a bell-cot, which is "nicely integrated" with the buttresses at the west end. Members of Morris & Co. were responsible for much of the stained glass: most was designed for the church, but some was rescued from Thomas Hellyer's demolished Royal National Hospital for Diseases of the Chest in nearby Ventnor and was installed in the church in 1975.	
Christ Church (More images)		Sandown; 50.6523°N 1.1613°W	Anglican	II	William Henry Woodman designed Sandown's Early English Gothic Revival parish church between 1845 and 1847 in response to the village's rapid growth. It was extended in 1861 (by Woodman) and 1874 (to the design of S.E. Tomkins), and has a clock tower with a stone steeple. The tower also serves as an entrance porch. Some of the stained glass is by Clayton and Bell and was paid for by Victoria, Princess Royal, Queen Victoria's eldest daughter, who often visited Sandown.	
St John the Evangelist's Church (More images)		Sandown; 50.6583°N 1.1531°W	Anglican	II	Architect C. L. Luck designed Sandown's second Anglican church, a large, tall five-bay building with the chancel forming the endmost bay, in 1880–81. A "plain, simple structure", it is also in the Early English Gothic Revival style. A small spire sits on the roof above the divide between the nave and the chancel. The nave has aisles on both sides. An intricately carved stone lectern was installed in 1903.	
The Lighthouse Church (More images)		Sandown; 50.6578°N 1.1486°W	Assemblies of God	–	This Pentecostal church's name was originally Bethel Christian Fellowship. A later name was Bethel Gospel Hall, with which it was registered for marriages in May 1984. After a period with the name New Hope Christian Fellowship, it became The Lighthouse Church in 2021.	
Sandown Baptist Church (More images)		Sandown; 50.6561°N 1.1549°W	Baptist	–	One of several Nonconformist chapels founded in Sandown in the mid- to late 19th century, the Baptist church dates from 1882 and was registered for marriages in February 1886. Pell Street, its original street address, later became Station Avenue. The corner-site chapel is an Early English Gothic Revival polychromatic brick building—mainly red, but with black and white brickwork as decoration—lancet windows and turreted gables. S.E. Tomkins was the architect. Meetings initially took place in a room above a factory from August 1881, the church was formally founded six months later, building work started in March 1882 and the chapel opened on 20 July 1882.	
Avenue Road Church (More images)		Sandown; 50.6578°N 1.1502°W	Evangelical	–	Sandown's Primitive Methodist chapel was built in 1866 and was registered for marriages in May of the following year. Wesleyan and United Methodist chapels already existed in the town, and the chapel fell out of use by 1938 and was sold to an independent Evangelical group.	
Sandown Methodist Church (More images)		Sandown; 50.6552°N 1.1539°W	Methodist	–	A Bible Christian chapel was founded in the town in 1828, but it was rebuilt in 1882 and reregistered for marriages (under the name York Road Bible Christian Chapel) in June of that year. A Gothic Revival chapel of pale stone with courses of darker stone on its façade, it is now the only active Methodist church in the town: the Avenue Road chapel is now Evangelical, while the Wesleyan church of 1866 is now in commercial use.	
St Patrick's Church (More images)		Sandown; 50.6517°N 1.1604°W	Roman Catholic	II	The Catholic population of Sandown was increased in the 19th century by soldiers from a nearby fort, and arrangements for Mass to be said in the town were formalised when a resident priest was appointed in 1907. The chapel of Albert Lodge was used, but work began on a permanent church in 1928 (delayed by World War I). W.C. Mangan designed St Patrick's Church in the style of Honan Chapel in Cork, an important building of the Irish Arts and Crafts movement: although not an exact replica, the "florid" Neo-Norman style contrasts greatly with Mangan's earlier church at Totland. The Harry Clarke Studios designed the "excellent ... jewel-like" stained glass. The church was registered for marriages in November 1929 and was awarded Grade II listed status in June 2020.	
St Peter's Church (More images)		Seaview; 50.7199°N 1.1118°W	Anglican	II	Thomas Hellyer designed the first part of the church in 1859–62. When it opened it was a chapel of ease to St Helen's Church, but a parish was created in 1907. Extensions and additions were built in around 1871, 1920 (to the design of Stephen Salter), 1973 and 1984. The church's "most memorable feature" is the elaborate rood screen of 1909, designed by the firm of Jones & Willis (as were the contemporary choir stalls), and there is stained glass by William Morris. The spire was removed in the 1960s because of structural problems.	
Grace Church IoW (More images)		Seaview; 50.7201°N 1.1115°W	Evangelical	–	This was founded as an independent Evangelical church in 1854 with the name Beulah Free Church. This was a time of growth in Seaview: in the same decade St Peter's Church and the first Methodist chapel were founded. The Evangelical chapel later became associated with the newly formed Grace Church IoW in nearby Ryde.	
St Michael the Archangel's Church (More images)		Shalfleet; 50.7013°N 1.4154°W	Anglican	I	Work of several periods from the early Norman era onwards contributes to "one of the most interesting ... churches on the island". The substantial tower, which for many years had no external doors, resembles the keep of a castle and may have had a secondary defensive purpose. It dates from the late 11th century and is the oldest part of the structure. The church assumed its present appearance by the 15th century after several additions. A spire added around 1800 was removed in the early 20th century and the tower now has battlements. An arched doorway also survives from the Norman period. The stained glass, by Ward and Hughes and Jones & Willis, is Victorian and later.	
St Blasius Church (More images)		Shanklin; 50.6218°N 1.1836°W	Anglican	II*	Shanklin's ancient parish church was built as a chapel to serve Shanklin Manor. Until the 19th century it was "a simple rectangle", but substantial rebuilding and extension since then (especially in 1853 and 1859) has given it a mostly Victorian appearance. The dedication was then changed in the early 20th century from St John the Baptist to St Blasius. Interior fittings include an intricately carved wooden chest of the 16th century, originally in Winchester Cathedral.	
St Paul's Church (More images)		Shanklin; 50.6326°N 1.1783°W	Anglican	II	C.L. Luck started this church near Shanklin railway station in 1875–76, but it was not completed until 1890. It was restored after bomb damage in 1943. The chancel has an apse with an ambulatory, and a clerestory continues round into the nave. The design resembles French Gothic. A gabled porch was added in 1911 to the design of Percy Stone. The parish (officially known as St Paul's, Gatten) was formed in 1876 and was formed from part of Sandown parish.	
St Saviour-on-the-Cliff Church (More images)		Shanklin; 50.6287°N 1.1749°W	Anglican	II	"The church of seaside Shanklin" stands on a high cliff above the beach and was opened in 1869. Thomas Hellyer was responsible for the early parts of the building; the chancel and nave date from then, and his south aisle was completed two years later. T.E.C. Streatfield added the north aisle, also of four bays, in 1875–76. The tower and spire were completed in 1887 to the design of W.O. Milne, bells were hung the following year, and the same architect extended the church to the west in 1903–05. Architect Sir Charles Nicholson, 2nd Baronet designed the reredos in the Lady chapel in 1948, just before his death.	
Shanklin Methodist Church (More images)		Shanklin; 50.6305°N 1.1780°W	Methodist	–	The church dates from 1883 and was originally Wesleyan; another Methodist chapel (later United Methodist) built two years later is no longer in use. The "unorthodox" four-light window on the main façade has Geometrical tracery, and the gabled front has corner turrets.	
The Gospel Hall (More images)		Shanklin; 50.6301°N 1.1792°W	Open Brethren	–	This Gospel hall stands on Landguard Road in the town centre.	
Church of the Sacred Heart of Jesus (More images)		Shanklin; 50.6332°N 1.1780°W	Roman Catholic	–	A tin tabernacle was provided for Catholics in Shanklin until a Flemish Gothic-style church was built in 1906–07. This was bombed in 1943, leaving only the base of the tower; this was incorporated into the new brick-built church, designed by Ventnor firm Gilbert & Hobson's architect R. Lethieullier Gilbert. The tower incorporates the porch and projects from the main body of the church, which has a "distinctive 1950s design": in particular, the raked-back concrete-framed windows of the nave recall those at Coventry Cathedral, designed around the same time. Inside is a crucifix designed in 1949 for a temporary building used until the new church opened in 1957.	
Shanklin United Reformed Church (More images)		Shanklin; 50.6295°N 1.1786°W	United Reformed Church	–	Shanklin's first Congregational church was registered for marriages in 1868, but an Independent congregation had been meeting since 1841. The present Early English Gothic Revival chapel, of pale stone with a "handsome" tall clock tower (repaired in 1954 after war damage), was designed by J. Sulman friba, as recorded on the foundation stone (image). It opened in August 1883 and was registered three months later. The earlier church was demolished to make way for the new building, which cost £4,400, and the old stones were reused in the new Sunday school hall.	
Church of Jesus Christ of Latter-day Saints, Newport Chapel (More images)		Shide; 50.6910°N 1.2900°W	Latter-day Saint	–	A Latter-day Saint congregation was recorded in Newport in the religious census of 1851, although the present cause does not derive directly from that. The meetinghouse was registered for marriages in December 1969.	
St Peter's Church (More images)		Shorwell; 50.6449°N 1.3545°W	Anglican	I	The church has fabric dating between the 13th and 18th centuries, but the original building was a 12th-century chapelry linked to Carisbrooke church. It was parished at some point in the Middle Ages. The appearance is largely Perpendicular Gothic, and the church has north and south aisles which continue along the whole length of the nave and chancel, a tower with a stone spire and entrance porches on the north and south sides—one of which contains a reset Norman doorway.	
Shorwell Methodist Church (More images)		Shorwell; 50.6398°N 1.3515°W	Methodist	–	The chapel has been in continuous use since 1868 or earlier and was built for Wesleyans. It was registered for marriages in July 1919.	
St Michael and All Angels Church (More images)		Swanmore, Ryde; 50.7192°N 1.1689°W	Anglican	II*	Rev. William Gray, who was also an amateur architect, designed the main part of this church in the Swanmore suburb in 1861–63 in conjunction with local architect R.J. Jones, who completed the east end in 1873–74. It was parished in 1864. The large and "somewhat striking" cruciform building has an apsidal end and a central tower for which a spire was intended. The stone exterior contrasts with the polychrome brickwork inside. The firm of Lavers, Barraud and Westlake designed stained glass for the church, but much was destroyed in World War II.	
Zion Chapel (More images)		Swanmore, Ryde; 50.7200°N 1.1689°W	Non-denominational	L	In its present form as a non-denominational Christian church, Zion Chapel was registered for marriages in July 1979. The building dates from 1853, though, and was erected for Wesleyans (still with the name Zion Chapel). A schoolroom was added in 1880. The 19th-century pulpit survives inside, as does the general form of the building.	
St Swithun's Church (More images)		Thorley; 50.6966°N 1.4698°W	Anglican	II	This 1871 replacement for the disused medieval church next to the manor house is "a work of originality" by W.J. Stratton, a local architect. It was consecrated on 9 December of that year. Its distinctive bell-tower rises from the gap between the south porch and the transept and is topped by a small stone spire. There is a stone interior and a buff- and red-brick interior with "stridently coloured" wall tiles. Some stonework was reused from the old church, and the 15th-century bells were also taken from it.	
Christ Church (More images)		Totland; 50.6761°N 1.5449°W	Anglican	–	The church dates from two periods: the nave and original chancel were designed in 1875 by the firm of Habershon and Pite, and the chancel was rebuilt in 1910 to the design of Percy Stone (who was also responsible for the lychgate two years earlier). Work was also carried out in 1888, and the south aisle was built in 1905–06.	
Kingdom Hall (More images)		Totland; 50.6824°N 1.5383°W	Jehovah's Witnesses	–	The Kingdom Hall for the west of the island was registered for marriages in February 1984.	
St Saviour's Church (More images)		Totland; 50.6764°N 1.5411°W	Roman Catholic	II	Catholic worship in the western part of the island was originally focused on the chapel at Weston Manor near Totland, which opened to the public in September 1871 in a manor house built the year before by the Ward family. Their son left £5,000 for a separate church to be built, and in 1923 W.C. Mangan (in conjunction with his father) designed a red-brick church of "considerable originality" and "strident individualism". It is the round-arched Italian Romanesque style fashionable at the time and favoured by both architects, although with some Art Deco features. It was registered for marriages in August 1924, and was Grade II-listed in October 2021.	
Holy Trinity Church (More images)		Ventnor; 50.5976°N 1.1967°W	Anglican	II*	A Somerset architect, C.E. Giles, designed Ventnor's second Anglican church in 1861–62. It was parished and consecrated in the latter year. The design is "freely interpreted" Gothic Revival. The large church stands on a corner and has a tall needle spire with a shingled exterior. An intricate rood screen of 1911, one of several fittings acquired by Charles Barker King and installed in the church over a period of many years, is prominent inside. Almost all the stained glass is original, designed by Clayton and Bell.	
St Alban's Church (More images)		Ventnor; 50.5954°N 1.2148°W	Anglican	–	The church serves the northwestern part of Ventnor and dates from 1922–23. F.M. Coley designed the building, on a narrow, sloping site, in a "simple Romanesque style" using smooth sandstone laid in courses. The chancel has a rounded apse and has no structural division from the nave; the south aisle also has an apsidal end. There is one stained glass window of 1931 by Ninian Comper.	
St Catherine's Church (More images)		Ventnor; 50.5947°N 1.2068°W	Anglican	II	Ventnor's first parish church was designed by Robert Ebbels in 1836–37 and was paid for by John Hamborough of Steephill Castle. At that stage it consisted of a nave and tower with a spire; the chancel was built 12 years later, and other parts (including the south aisle, which now accommodates a parish hall) were added around the turn of the 20th century. The spire was removed in 1921. The now demolished St Margaret's Church at Lowtherville (Upper Ventnor) was a chapel of ease to St Catherine's, built in 1882.	
Ventnor Baptist Church (More images)		Ventnor; 50.5942°N 1.2049°W	Baptist	–	Ventnor's Baptist chapel dates from 1875 and stands on Pier Street.	
Church of Our Lady and St Wilfrid (More images)		Ventnor; 50.5971°N 1.1982°W	Roman Catholic	–	Thomas Chatfield Clarke designed "a fairly conventional mid-Victorian church" for Ventnor's Catholic worshippers in 1871. A site had been acquired the year before. The stone-built church had a nave, north aisle and bell-cot but no tower or spire. It was largely destroyed by fire on the afternoon of 3 December 2006: only the outer walls survived. The church hall was temporarily registered for worship in 2007, then a new church was built on its site. It was designed by Derek Hampshire and was dedicated on 26 May 2015.	
Ventnor Spiritualist Church (More images)		Ventnor; 50.5956°N 1.2020°W	Spiritualist	–	There has been a Spiritualist place of worship in Ventnor since the early 20th century. The current premises on Victoria Street were registered in November in 1939.	
Wellow Baptist Church (More images)		Wellow; 50.6924°N 1.4565°W	Baptist	L	Although registered for marriages in April 1911, this wayside chapel dates from 1805 and was built for a congregation of General Baptists who had assembled for worship since 1801. The walls are of rendered brick and the roof is tiled and steeply gabled. A gabled entrance porch is flanked by lancet windows, and there are two shorter windows above. The chapel was extended to the rear before 1840. Rev. William Reed, the first pastor, and his wife are commemorated inside. Their memorial states "by whose joint efforts ... the first Baptist Church and Sunday School in the Isle of Wight were founded in Wellow, 1801".	
St Mildred's Church (More images)		Whippingham; 50.7398°N 1.2770°W	Anglican	I	A church existed in this large parish in Saxon times, but only some reset stone walling survives from before the 19th century. John Nash rebuilt the church in 1804, but when it became the church of the Osborne House estate it was decided a new, more elaborate building was needed. Accordingly it was demolished and rebuilt to a new, eclectic design between 1854 and 1862; A. J. Humbert was the architect, but Prince Albert had some influence. The "splendid new structure, considered more fitting for the royal family", incorporates Gothic and Romanesque elements and has a large central tower with a Rhenish-style spire flanked by tall, thin pinnacles. The church is cruciform and lacks aisles. Several princes and princesses have memorials inside.	
St Mary and St Radegund's Church (More images)		Whitwell; 50.5974°N 1.2642°W	Anglican	II*	Two ancient chapels built alongside each other for different purposes were combined into one church in the medieval era—an unusual arrangement. St Radegund (or St Rhadegund) chapel was a simple aisleless church built by the lord of the manor of Gatcombe, who had tenant farmers in Whitwell. The 12th-century lord's patron saint was Radegund, a 6th-century Frankish queen. In the mid-13th century, the lord of the manor of Stenbury (Note: A manor within the parish of Godshill. Its name survives in Stenbury Down near Ventnor.) built a narrower chapel for the use of his tenant farmers in the area. This section was widened, lengthened and connected to the older chapel in the early 16th century, and a tower was added. R.J. Jones undertook some restoration work in 1868.	
St Edmund's Church (More images)		Wootton; 50.7309°N 1.2342°W	Anglican	II*	For many years, St Edmund's was one of several Anglican chapels of ease to St George's Church in the vast parish of Arreton. Norman-era fabric remains—in particular the intricately moulded 12th-century doorway, "the finest feature of the church". The church is small and lacks aisles, transepts or a tower: there is only a bell-cot on the west gable, added in 1884 to the design of Thomas Chatfeild Clarke, who also undertook general restoration. Percy Stone did further work in 1908. A chantry chapel was added in the late 12th or early 13th century but was later demolished.	
St Mark's Church (More images)		Wootton; 50.7230°N 1.2387°W	Anglican	–	Mary Nunn Harvey, a resident of Shanklin who was associated with St Paul's Church at Barton, gave money and land near Wootton Bridge (then in the parish of Arreton) for the construction of a tin tabernacle to serve the village, as St Edmund's Church and Arreton parish church were both distant. It opened on 16 September 1885 and an ecclesiastical district was created in 1898. It was replaced by the present St Mark's Church on a different site in 1910. Percy Stone designed the red-brick and stone chapel, with a "striking" and "remarkably original" interior, and it was built by T. and E.W. Jenkins of Newport. Following a period of closure in the mid-20th century it reopened in 1970.	
Wootton Bridge Methodist Church (More images)		Wootton; 50.7196°N 1.2421°W	Methodist	–	Wootton village had three Methodist chapels in 1889, one of which (Ebenezer Chapel) stood near the Woodmans Arms pub and the railway station. Nearly destroyed in a storm in 1897, it was demolished and replaced with a new brick chapel opposite the station. This took the name Station Road Methodist Chapel and was registered for marriages in March 1925. The congregation of the former Methodist chapel in the centre of the village joined the Station Road church with effect from 12 September 2004, at which point the name Wootton Bridge Methodist Church was adopted.	
St John the Evangelist's Church (More images)		Wroxall; 50.6164°N 1.2228°W	Anglican	II	When the new church at Swanmore was opened in 1863, the small wooden chapel used until then was moved to Wroxall to serve the rural community. The village developed rapidly after Wroxall railway station was opened in 1866, and stone quarried during construction of the line was used to build a larger church. It was designed by a local architect, T.R. Saunders, between 1876 and 1877. The "unorthodox Gothic" tower was built at the southwest corner in 1911 to accommodate a clock gifted to the parish by a veteran of the Crimean War; in the same year some internal fittings were added, but most of the interior remains as it did when the church was built. Some of the stained glass is by Heaton, Butler and Bayne. The church has a slate roof, a chancel of two bays and a four-bay nave.	
Wroxall Methodist Church (More images)		Wroxall; 50.6154°N 1.2226°W	Methodist	–	Wroxall's Bible Christian chapel (originally called Providence Chapel) was founded in 1838. The building was designed in an "unconventional Early English Gothic Revival style" with a gabled façade, a centrally placed four-light window with tracery and turrets at the corners. It was registered for marriages in March 1904.	
St James's Church (More images)		Yarmouth; 50.7055°N 1.4992°W	Anglican and Methodist	II*	Two earlier churches in the port town of Yarmouth were destroyed-one in a French raid of 1377-and the present building was consecrated in 1626. The castellated west tower was raised in height by 30 feet (9.1 m) in 1831 (in ashlar, contrasting with the pale weathered stone of the rest of the church) to act as a sea mark. Local architect D.A. Alexander was responsible for this work. A clock was added to the tower in 1879, and ten years later the firm of John Colson & Son extended the chancel by 12 feet (3.7 m). The nave has aisles on both sides. Yarmouth's Methodist congregation transferred here following the closure of their chapel, and the church is now administered jointly.	
St John the Baptist's Church (More images)		Yaverland; 50.6699°N 1.1325°W	Anglican	I	The church was built in the mid-12th century as a manorial chapel associated with Yaverland Manor. It retains a columned Norman doorway with a "strange pattern of small intersecting circles", but the present appearance of the building is Victorian as a result of Ewan Christian's restoration of 1887–89. He added the timber bell-cot and porch, built aisles and a vestry, extended the chancel and reordered the interior. Much of the stained glass is also of this era. The church was parished from the 15th century but was always linked with the parish church of nearby Brading.	

== Bibliography ==
- Bacon, Dennis (2002). St Helens, Isle of Wight, Then & Now: 1952–2002. St Helens: St Helens Historical Society.
- Blanchard, Phillip (2001). Newport, Carisbrooke and Parkhurst. Images of England. Stroud: Tempus Publishing. ISBN 0-7524-2207-3.
- Cheverton, R.J.; Matthews, S.L. (n.d.). Memories of Old Seaview. Newport: Richards Printers.
- Davenport Adams, William Henry (1873). Nelson's Handbook to the Isle of Wight: Its History, Topography, and Antiquities. London: T. Nelson and Sons.
- East Cowes Heritage (1994). Discovering East Cowes. Newport: Island Books. ISBN 1-898198-04-7.
- Ednay, Peter (1993). Newport in Times Past. Carisbrooke: Vectis Research. ISBN 1-897865-00-7.
- Gazey, Doreen (2009). The History of St Mark's Church 1909–2009. Wootton: St Mark's Church, Wootton.
- Gosden, Hilary (2010). A History of the Wesleyan Methodist Chapel at Wootton Bridge. Wootton: Hilary Gosden.
- Groves, John (2004). Cowes: The Jewel of the Solent. Cowes: Rotary Club of Cowes.
- Hague, Graham; Hague, Judy (1986). The Unitarian Heritage: An Architectural Survey (PDF) (1st ed.). Sheffield: Unitarian Heritage. ISBN 0-9511081-0-7.
- Hill, Roy (2002) [1990]. The Assemblies Address Book (PDF) (5th ed.). Bristol: Christian Year Publications. ISBN 1-872734-25-1. Archived from the original (PDF) on 19 September 2004.
- Hooper, Paul (2002). A History of Newport Congregational Church. Freshwater: West Island Group.
- I.O.W. Teachers' Centre (1976). Newport Town Trail. Newport: Isle of Wight County Council.
- Kelly, Bernard W. (1907). Historical Notes on English Catholic Missions (PDF). London: Kegan Paul, Trench, Trübner & Co.
- Lane, Marian (1994). Parish Churches of the Isle of Wight. Newport: South Wight Borough Council.
- Lloyd, David W.; Pevsner, Nikolaus (2006). The Isle of Wight. The Buildings of England. London: Yale University Press. ISBN 978-0-300-10733-3.
- Nott, Patrick A. (2011). The Religious Society of Friends. The First 350 Years in Newport and the Isle of Wight: A History of Local Quakerism from 1657 (PDF). Patrick Nott. Archived from the original (PDF) on 29 June 2016.
- Parr, Donald A. (1994). Around Ryde in Old Photographs. Britain in Old Photographs. Stroud: Alan Sutton Publishing. ISBN 0-7509-0815-7.
- Ryde Social Heritage Group (2008). Ryde's Heritage: Our Town, Your Histories. Ryde: Ryde Social Heritage Group. ISBN 978-0-9558987-0-9.
- Scammell, Hilary; Blackmore, Timothy (1980). Past and Present Sandown and Shanklin. Newport: Isle of Wight County Library. ISBN 0-906328-07-1.
- Stell, Christopher (1991). Inventory of Nonconformist Chapels and Meeting-Houses in South-West England. London: Royal Commission on the Historical Monuments of England. ISBN 0-117011-81-9.
- Summerson, John (1980). The Life and Work of John Nash, Architect. London: George Allen & Unwin. ISBN 0-04-720021-9.
- Vickers, John A., ed. (1993). The Religious Census of Hampshire 1851. Southampton: Hampshire County Council, Planning Department. ISBN 1-8735953-0-1.
- Winter, C.W.R. (1981). The Ancient Town of Yarmouth. Newport: The Isle of Wight County Press. ISBN 0-9501779-7-0.
