= St Faith's Church =

St Faith's Church may refer to:

== England ==
- St Faith's Church, Bacton, Herefordshire
- St Faith's Church, Belper Lane End, Derbyshire
- St Faith's Church, Cowes, Isle of Wight
- St Faith's Church, Dunswell, East Riding of Yorkshire
- St Faith, Farmcote
- St Faith's Church, Gaywood, Norfolk
- St Faith's Church, Havant, Hampshire
- St Faith's Church, Hexton, Hertfordshire
- St Faith's Church, Kelshall
- St Faith's Church, Kilsby, Northamptonshire
- St Faith's Church, Lincoln
- St Faith's Church, Little Witchingham, Norfolk
- St Faith's Church, Newton, Northamptonshire
- St Faith's Church, Nottingham
- St Faith's Church, Shellingford, Oxfordshire
- St Faith's Church, Wilsthorpe, Lincolnshire
- St Faith's Church, Winchester
- St Faith under St Paul's, City of London
- Horsham St Faith Priory, Horsham St Faith, Norfolk

== Australia ==
- St Faith's Church, Glen Iris, Victoria
- St Faith's Church, Pechey, Queensland

== France ==
- St. Faith's Church, Sélestat

== See also ==
- St. Faith's, KwaZulu-Natal, South Africa
- St Faith's School
