= All Saints' Church, Freshwater =

Church on the Isle of Wight, England

Coordinates: 50°41′05″N 01°30′35″W

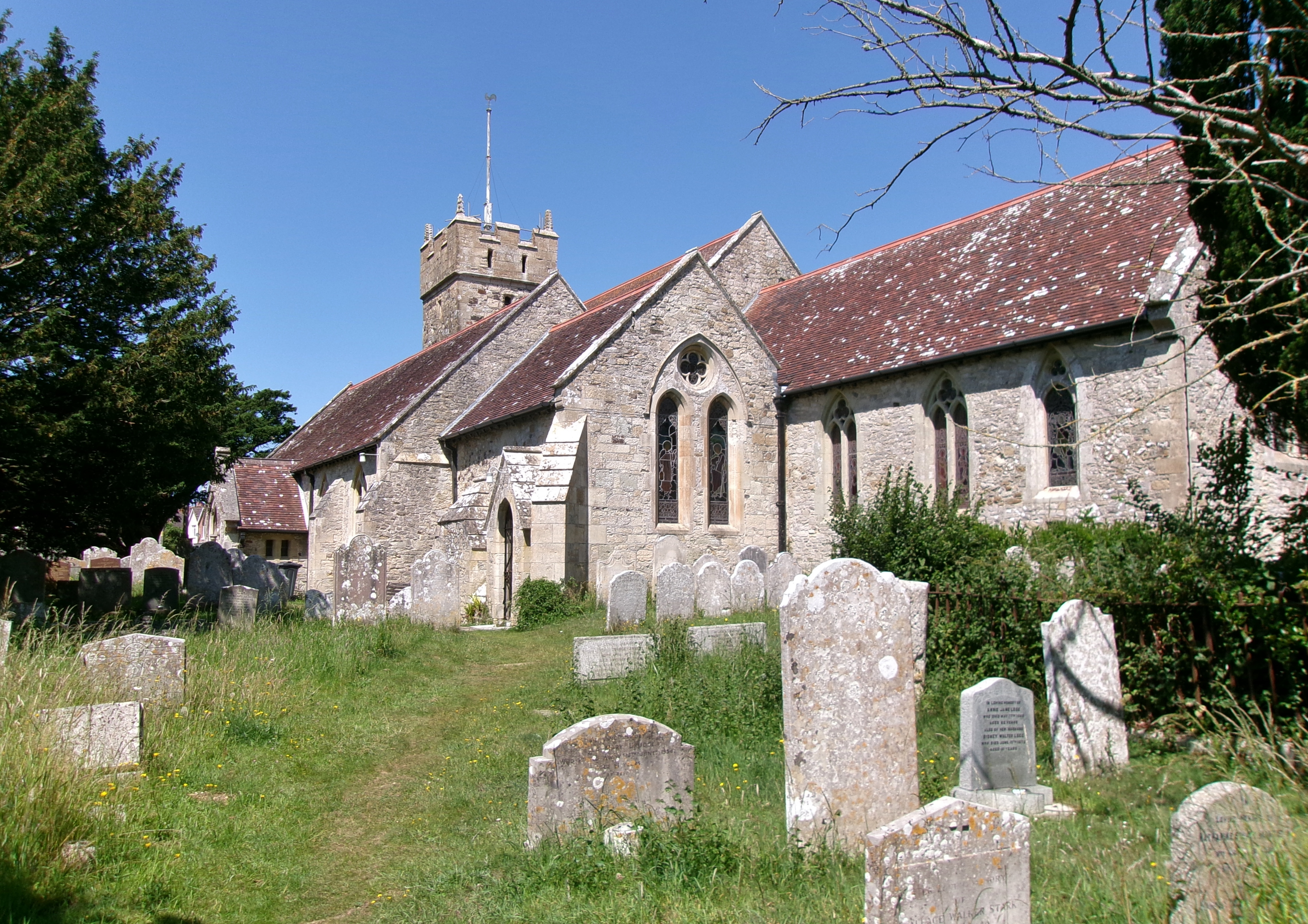
- All Saints' Church, Freshwater
- Denomination: Church of England
- Churchmanship: Broad Church

History
- Dedication: All Saints

Administration
- Province: Canterbury
- Diocese: Portsmouth
- Parish: Freshwater, Isle of Wight

Clergy
- Vicar: Revd Leisa Potter

All Saints' Church, Freshwater is a parish church in the Church of England located in Freshwater, Isle of Wight.

== History ==
The church is medieval. It is one of the oldest churches on the Isle of Wight, and was listed in the Domesday Book of 1086. Mark Whatson is the pastor of All Saints, which is an Anglican church in the Anglican Diocese of Portsmouth. A primary school associated with the church is nearby.

== Memorials ==
There is a marble memorial commemorating Alfred Tennyson, 1st Baron Tennyson in All Saints Church. His wife Emily Tennyson, Baroness Tennyson, son Hallam Tennyson, 2nd Baron Tennyson and other family members are buried in the church cemetery. The church is also the site of a memorial to Tennyson's son, Lionel Tennyson, who died of malaria in 1886. Inside the Church there are memorial plaques to members of the Crozier Family who resided nearby. Lady Mary Martin is also remembered on a plaque, her maiden name being Crozier. Admiral Crozier is buried near to Lord Tennyson in a large Table Tomb. The lychgate was built compete with roof in memory of The Crozier Family.

The churchyard contains 20 Commonwealth war graves, 15 of World War I, including an unidentified seaman, and five from World War II, a member of the Tennyson family being among the former.

== Parish status ==
The church is in a united parish with St Agnes' Church, Freshwater.

== Organ ==
The organ was built in 1905 by Henry Speechley and Sons.

A specification of the organ can be found on the National Pipe Organ Register.
