= Holy Trinity Church, Bembridge =

Coordinates: 50°41′23″N 01°05′26″W

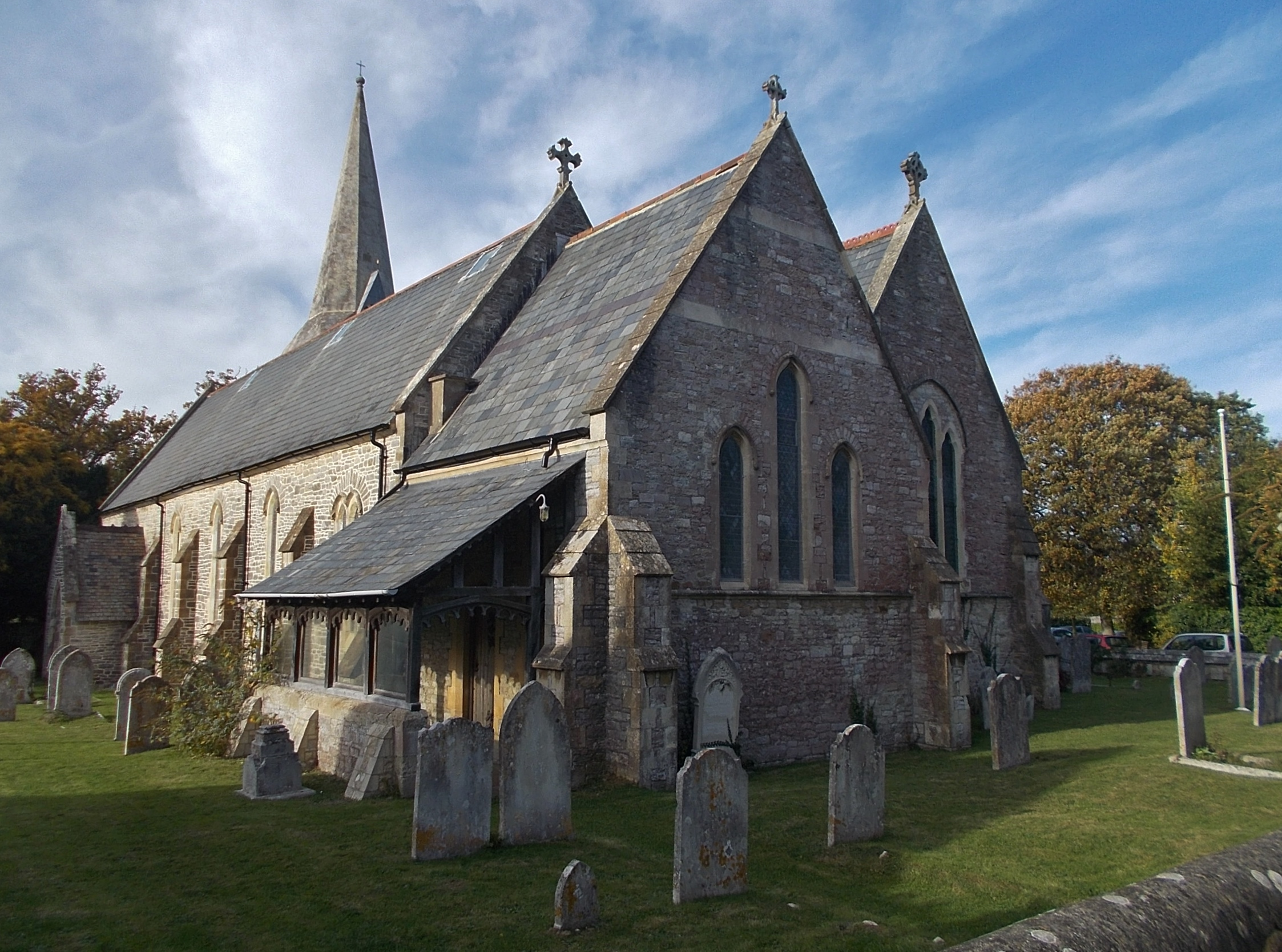
- Viewed from the south-east
- Holy Trinity Church, Bembridge
- Denomination: Church of England
- Churchmanship: Broad Church

History
- Dedication: Holy Trinity

Administration
- Province: Canterbury
- Diocese: Portsmouth
- Parish: Bembridge

Clergy
- Vicar: Reverend Steve Daughtery

Holy Trinity Church is a parish church in the Church of England located in Bembridge, Isle of Wight.

== Setting ==
The church is set in a leafy one-way system, connecting the high street to the harbour. It is adjacent to the local library (former school-house of the village) and heritage centre. The village war memorial is a short walk up the hill.

== History ==
The church was built in 1845 and 1846.

The first church in Bembridge was built in 1827, but was replaced due to instability by the current building.

== Organ ==
The church has a pipe organ dating from 1884 by Forster and Andrews. A specification of the organ can be found on the National Pipe Organ Register.
