= Church of St Michael and All Angels, Swanmore, Ryde =

Church on the Isle of Wight, England

Coordinates: 50°43′08″N 01°10′08″W

Church of St. Michael and All Angels, Swanmore, Ryde
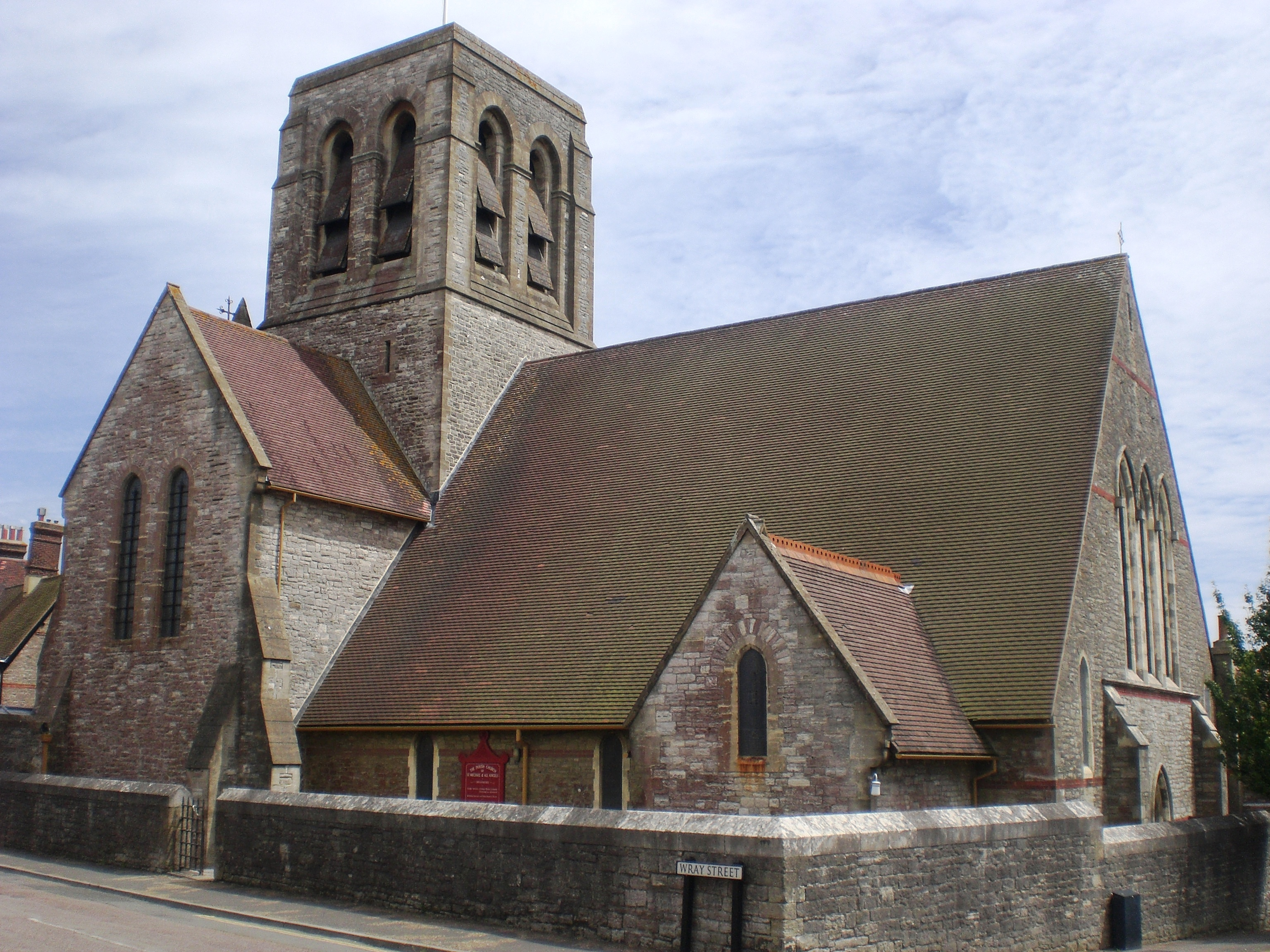
- Church of St. Michael and All Angels, Swanmore, Ryde
- Church of St. Michael and All Angels, Swanmore, Ryde
- Denomination: Church of England
- Churchmanship: Anglo Catholic

History
- Dedication: St. Michael and All Angels
- Consecrated: 1862

Architecture
- Closed: 2018

Administration
- Province: Canterbury
- Diocese: Portsmouth
- Parish: Ryde

The Church of St. Michael and All Angels, Swanmore, near Haylands in Ryde is a former parish church in the Church of England located in Ryde, Isle of Wight.

== History ==
The church was built between 1857 and 1862 by the architect R. J. Jones in the French Gothic style, and was consecrated by the Bishop of Winchester in 1863. It is located in the Swanmore area of Ryde. The church was closed in December 2018 despite a campaign to save it.

== Organ ==
The organ was built in 1864 by Gray & Davison. A specification of the organ can be found on the National Pipe Organ Register.
