= St Agnes' Church, Freshwater =

Historic church in Freshwater, Isle of Wight, England

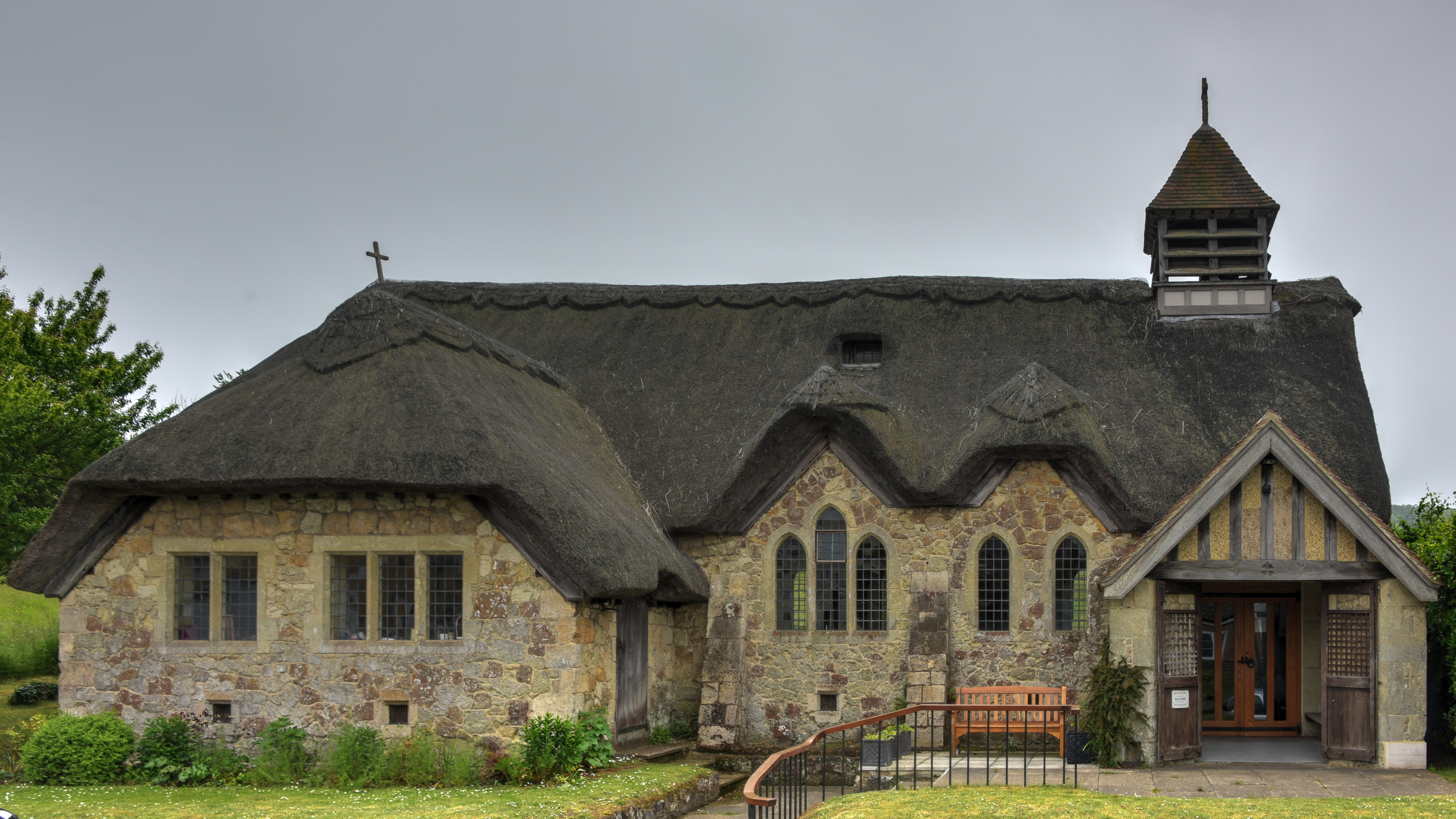
- St Agnes' Church, Freshwater
- 50°40′24″N 01°31′03″W
- Denomination: Church of England
- Churchmanship: Broad Church
- Website: allsaintsandstagnes.org.uk

History
- Dedication: St Agnes

Administration
- Province: Canterbury
- Diocese: Portsmouth
- Parish: Freshwater, Isle of Wight

St Agnes' Church, Freshwater is a parish church in the Church of England located in Freshwater, Isle of Wight.

== History ==
The church dates from 1908 and was designed by the architect Isaac Jones (1850–1917).

Hallam Tennyson, 2nd Baron Tennyson donated land for a new church in Freshwater Bay. Hallam's wife Audrey Tennyson suggested that the church be named for St Agnes. St Agnes Church was consecrated 12 August 1908. It is the only thatched church on the Isle of Wight.

The stone used to build the Church came from an old and derelict farm house on Hooke Hill, Freshwater, and the date stone 1622 [sic] was incorporated into the vestry wall, thus rather misleading those who may think the Church belonged to the 17th century".

== Parish status ==
The church is in a united parish with All Saints' Church, Freshwater.

== Organ ==
A specification of the organ can be found on the National Pipe Organ Register.

== Gallery ==
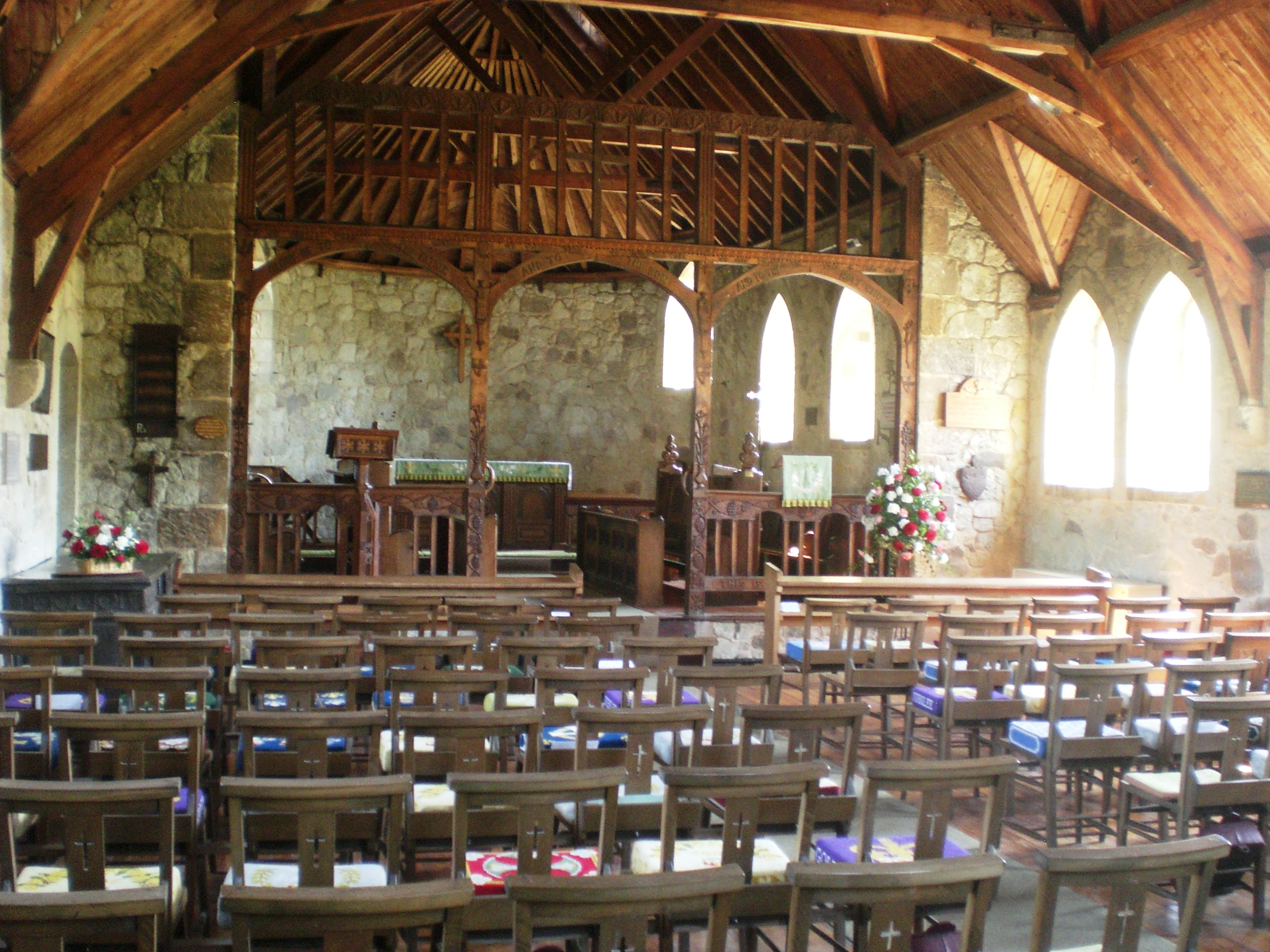
Interior of the church

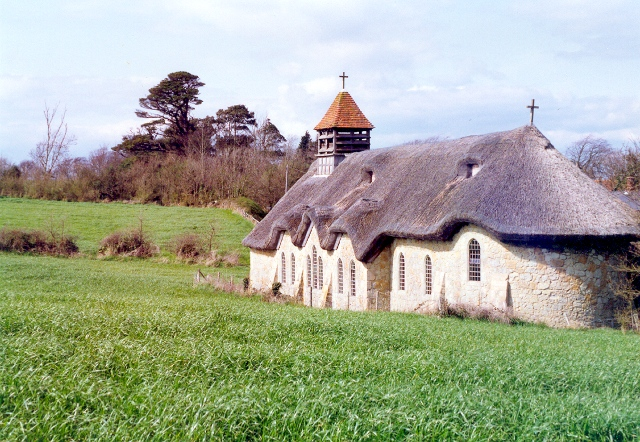
The church seen from the fields
