= St Faith's Church, Cowes =

Coordinates: 50°45′15″N 01°17′54″W

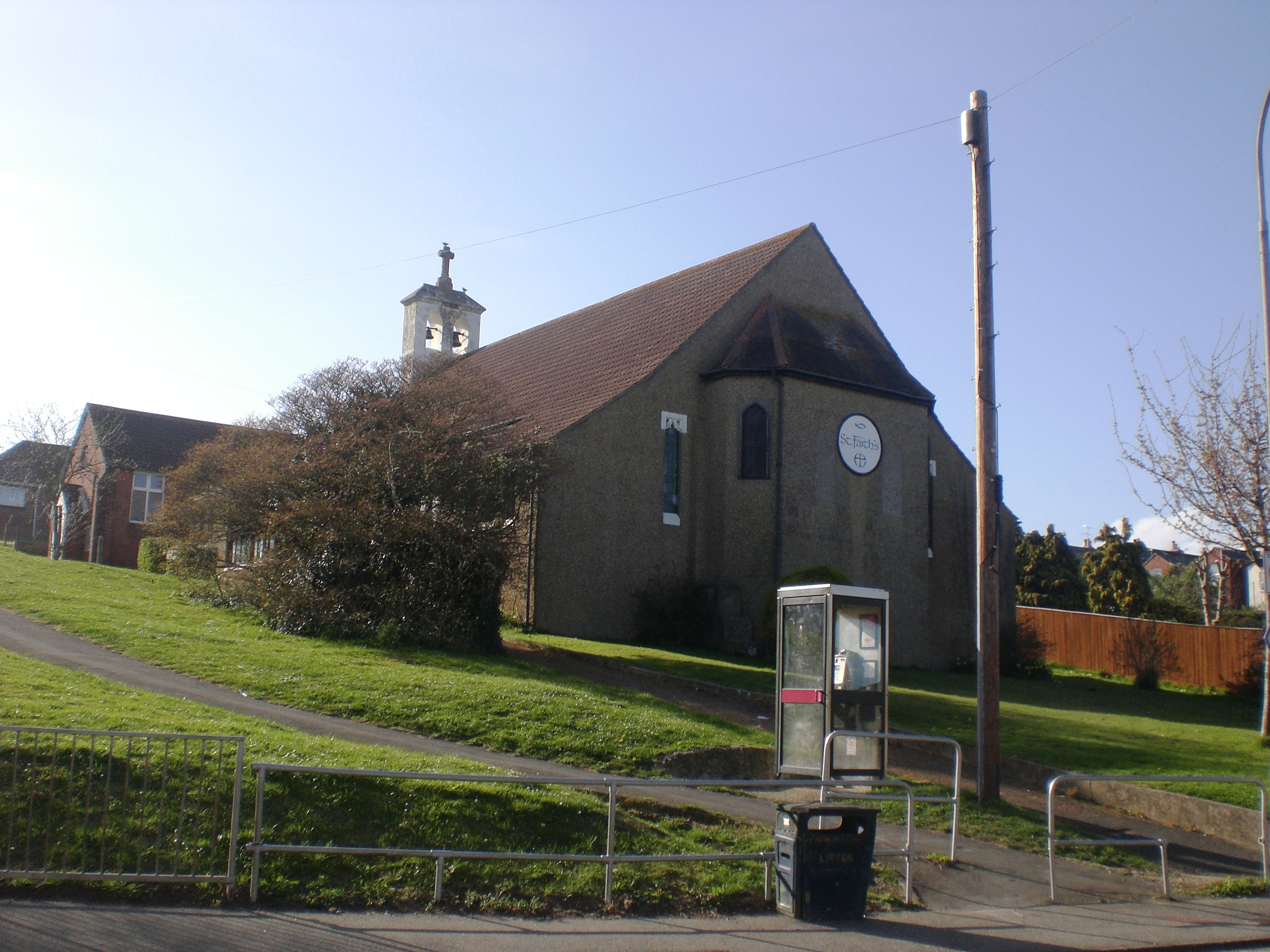
- St Faith's Church, Cowes
- Denomination: Church of England
- Churchmanship: Broad Church

History
- Dedication: St Faith

Administration
- Province: Canterbury
- Diocese: Portsmouth
- Parish: Cowes

St Faith's Church, Cowes is a parish church in the Church of England located in Cowes, Isle of Wight. In October 2013, the Diocese of Portsmouth revealed plans to close the church and merge the parish into a team ministry with other nearby churches. The parish now (as of 2021) forms part of the parish of All Saints, Gurnard, with St Faith, Cowes. The priest-in-charge of the adjacent parish of Northwood is as of 2021 also the priest-in-charge of All Saints with St Faith, and Church of England services are no longer held at the church.

== History ==
The church was built in 1909 by the architect J. Standen Adkins. Princess Beatrice laid the foundation stone on May 13, 1909.

A specification of the church organ can be found on the National Pipe Organ Register.
