= Grade II* listed buildings on the Isle of Wight =

There are over 20,000 Grade II* listed buildings in England. This page is a list of these buildings in the county of the Isle of Wight.

== Isle of Wight ==
Name	Location	Type	Completed (Note: The date given is the date used by Historic England as significant for the initial building or that of an important part in the structure's description.)	Date designated	Grid ref. (Note: The grid reference is based on the British national grid reference system, sometimes known as OSGB36, used by the Ordnance Survey.) Geo-coordinates	Entry number (Note: The "List Entry Number" is a unique number assigned to each listed building and scheduled monument by Historic England.)	Image
Arreton Manor	Arreton, Isle of Wight	Manor House	Between 1595 and 1612	21 July 1951	SZ5333786866; 50°40′44″N 1°14′47″W	1292259	Arreton Manor More images
Haseley Manor	Arreton, Isle of Wight	Dairy	18th century	21 July 1951	SZ5471285719; 50°40′07″N 1°13′38″W	1292781	Haseley Manor More images
Merstone Manor	Merstone, Arreton, Isle of Wight	Manor House	1605	21 July 1951	SZ5214485437; 50°39′59″N 1°15′49″W	1292159	Upload Photo
Standen House	Arreton, Isle of Wight	House	18th century addition	2 August 1957	SZ5071287113; 50°40′53″N 1°17′01″W	1209182	Standen House More images
Nunwell House	Brading, Isle of Wight	Coal Shed	19th century	21 July 1951	SZ5955687409; 50°41′00″N 1°09′30″W	1219725	Nunwell House More images
Mottistone Manor, the Dower House	Mottistone, Brighstone, Isle of Wight	Farmhouse	15th century or early 16th century	21 July 1951	SZ4062983797; 50°39′09″N 1°25′36″W	1209289	Mottistone Manor, the Dower House More images
Church of All Saints	Calbourne, Isle of Wight	Parish Church	13th century	18 January 1957	SZ4249986563; 50°40′38″N 1°24′00″W	1218604	Church of All Saints More images
Newtown Old Town Hall	Calbourne, Isle of Wight	Museum	c. 1699	18 January 1967	SZ4237090564; 50°42′47″N 1°24′04″W	1209336	Newtown Old Town Hall More images
Shalcombe Manor	Shalcombe, Calbourne, Isle of Wight	House	1994	28 March 1994	SZ3954185631; 50°40′08″N 1°26′31″W	1292704	Shalcombe Manor
Swainston Manor	Calbourne, Isle of Wight	House	16th century	21 July 1951	SZ4410887818; 50°41′18″N 1°22′37″W	1209329	Swainston Manor More images
Westover	Calbourne, Isle of Wight	House	c. 1760	18 January 1967	SZ4235386331; 50°40′30″N 1°24′07″W	1292706	Westover More images
Barn at Chale Abbey	Chale, Isle of Wight	Barn	Early 16th century	21 July 1951	SZ4853677818; 50°35′53″N 1°18′56″W	1292753	Upload Photo
Chale Abbey	Chale, Isle of Wight	House	1951	21 July 1951	SZ4860177820; 50°35′53″N 1°18′53″W	1218207	Upload Photo
Church of St Andrew	Chale, Isle of Wight	Parish Church	14th century	18 January 1967	SZ4832377567; 50°35′45″N 1°19′07″W	1209203	Church of St Andrew More images
Church of St Mary	Cowes, Isle of Wight	Tower	1815-1816	17 August 1951	SZ4933196170; 50°45′47″N 1°18′07″W	1222748	Church of St Mary More images
Hammerhead Crane at J S White Shipyard	Cowes, Isle of Wight	Cantilever Crane	1911	2 August 2004	SZ4997895469; 50°45′24″N 1°17′34″W	1390949	Hammerhead Crane at J S White Shipyard More images
Ivy House	Cowes, Isle of Wight	House	18th century	17 August 1951	SZ4953296163; 50°45′47″N 1°17′57″W	1267244	Upload Photo
Northwood House (former offices of Medina Borough Council)	Cowes, Isle of Wight	House	Early 19th century	17 August 1951	SZ4924496207; 50°45′48″N 1°18′11″W	1223779	Northwood House (former offices of Medina Borough Council) More images
Cowes Castle	Cowes, Isle of Wight	House	18th century	17 August 1951	SZ4937496559; 50°45′59″N 1°18′05″W	1267310	Cowes Castle More images
88 and 89 High Street	Cowes, Isle of Wight	House	Late 18th century	17 August 1951	SZ4963796199; 50°45′48″N 1°17′51″W	1222954	Upload Photo
Former Stables at Osborne House	Osborne House, East Cowes, Isle of Wight	Naval College	Converted 1903-4	23 January 1987	SZ5127394653; 50°44′57″N 1°16′29″W	1255100	Former Stables at Osborne House More images
Landing House	Norris Estate, East Cowes, Isle of Wight	Landing House	1855-6	5 July 2000	SZ5239995481; 50°45′24″N 1°15′31″W	1389288	Upload Photo
Precinct Walls of Old Quarr Abbey	Binstead, Fishbourne, Isle of Wight	Abbey	Probably 1131	18 May 1972	SZ5677692767; 50°43′54″N 1°11′49″W	1234997	Precinct Walls of Old Quarr Abbey
Afton Manor	Afton, Isle of Wight	House	c. 1725	18 January 1967	SZ3485186836; 50°40′49″N 1°30′29″W	1219355	Afton Manor
All Saints Church	Freshwater, Isle of Wight	Parish Church	Late 12th century	18 January 1967	SZ3470487305; 50°41′04″N 1°30′36″W	1209349	All Saints Church More images
Fort Albert	Cliff End, Freshwater, Isle of Wight	House	1970s-1980s	28 March 1994	SZ3296089072; 50°42′01″N 1°32′05″W	1291552	Fort Albert More images
Gatcombe House	Gatcombe, Isle of Wight	Country House	1751	21 July 1951	SZ4929185001; 50°39′45″N 1°18′14″W	1209216	Gatcombe House More images
Sheat Manor	Gatcombe, Isle of Wight	Garage	C20	21 July 1951	SZ4937284487; 50°39′29″N 1°18′10″W	1209219	Sheat Manor More images
Woodlands Vale, including attached rose arches, forecourt balustrading, terrace walling, alcove, pergola, steps, planters and ponds	Nettlestone and Seaview, Isle of Wight	House	1840-50	18 May 1972	SZ6129091697; 50°43′18″N 1°07′59″W	1234364	Upload Photo
Apollo Theatre	Newport, Isle of Wight	Theatre	1804	1 October 1953	SZ5005989145; 50°41′59″N 1°17′33″W	1276890	Apollo Theatre More images
Bellcroft House	Newport, Isle of Wight	Apartment	1953	1 October 1953	SZ5097789411; 50°42′08″N 1°16′46″W	1233835	Bellcroft House More images
Country Club, Old Literary Institute	Newport, Isle of Wight	House	1811	1 October 1953	SZ4987189135; 50°41′59″N 1°17′43″W	1365287	Country Club, Old Literary Institute
God's Providence House	Newport, Isle of Wight	House	Late 17th century	1 October 1953	SZ5000389122; 50°41′59″N 1°17′36″W	1365277	God's Providence House More images
Roman Catholic Church of St Thomas of Canterbury	Newport, Isle of Wight	Roman Catholic Church	1791	1 February 1972	SZ4970489050; 50°41′56″N 1°17′51″W	1232851	Roman Catholic Church of St Thomas of Canterbury More images
The Guildhall	Newport, Isle of Wight	Guildhall	1819	1 October 1953	SZ5001889217; 50°42′02″N 1°17′35″W	1278563	The Guildhall More images
The Old Grammar School	Newport, Isle of Wight	House	1614	1 February 1972	SZ4978189218; 50°42′02″N 1°17′47″W	1034526	The Old Grammar School More images
Church of St John the Baptist	Niton, Niton and Whitwell, Isle of Wight	Parish Church	11th century	18 January 1967	SZ5052176771; 50°35′19″N 1°17′16″W	1209258	Church of St John the Baptist More images
Church of St Mary and St Rhadegund	Whitwell, Niton and Whitwell, Isle of Wight	Parish Church	1967	18 January 1967	SZ5217777773; 50°35′50″N 1°15′51″W	1292740	Church of St Mary and St Rhadegund More images
Church of All Saints	Ryde, Isle of Wight	Church	1867/72	24 October 1950	SZ5890192299; 50°43′38″N 1°10′01″W	1274824	Church of All Saints More images
Church of St Michael and All Angels	Swanmore, Ryde, Isle of Wight	Church	1861/63	18 May 1972	SZ5876891387; 50°43′09″N 1°10′08″W	1239466	Church of St Michael and All Angels More images
The Royal Victoria Arcade	Ryde, Isle of Wight	Shopping Arcade	1835-1836	24 October 1950	SZ5921892746; 50°43′53″N 1°09′44″W	1239106	The Royal Victoria Arcade More images
Ningwood Manor House	Shalfleet, Isle of Wight	Manor House	c. 1650	18 January 1967	SZ4015288797; 50°41′51″N 1°25′58″W	1209391	Upload Photo
Shalfleet Manor	Shalfleet, Isle of Wight	Manor House	Late 16th century	2 August 1957	SZ4141089391; 50°42′10″N 1°24′54″W	1292685	Upload Photo
Church of St Blasius	Shanklin, Isle of Wight	Parish Church	1853	14 March 1949	SZ5784880555; 50°37′19″N 1°11′01″W	1034290	Church of St Blasius More images
Barn at Wolverton Manor	Shorwell, Isle of Wight	Barn	17th century	18 January 1967	SZ4528482364; 50°38′21″N 1°21′40″W	1220337	Upload Photo
Billingham Manor	Emmett Hill, Shorwell, Isle of Wight	House	1631	21 July 1951	SZ4860281899; 50°38′05″N 1°18′51″W	1291212	Upload Photo
Church of St James	Kingston, Shorwell, Isle of Wight	Parish Church	13th century	18 January 1967	SZ4788481299; 50°37′46″N 1°19′28″W	1209403	Church of St James More images
Kingston Manor	Kingston, Shorwell, Isle of Wight	Manor House	Early 17th century	21 July 1951	SZ4781881305; 50°37′46″N 1°19′31″W	1291119	Upload Photo
Westcourt Manor	Shorwell, Isle of Wight	Manor House	c. 1500	21 July 1951	SZ4517682752; 50°38′34″N 1°21′45″W	1291026	Westcourt Manor More images
Weston Manor	Totland, Isle of Wight	House	1869-70	28 March 1994	SZ3263586100; 50°40′25″N 1°32′22″W	1209416	Upload Photo
Church of St Boniface (old Church)	Bonchurch, Ventnor, Isle of Wight	Church	C12/C13	30 March 1951	SZ5778778023; 50°35′57″N 1°11′06″W	1224516	Church of St Boniface (old Church) More images
Church of St Lawrence	St Lawrence, Ventnor, Isle of Wight	Church	1878	15 July 1976	SZ5376076575; 50°35′11″N 1°14′31″W	1266331	Church of St Lawrence More images
East Dene, Workers Travel Association Guest House	Ventnor, Isle of Wight	Guest House	1951	30 March 1951	SZ5775578136; 50°36′00″N 1°11′07″W	1224413	East Dene, Workers Travel Association Guest House More images
Holy Trinity Church	Ventnor, Isle of Wight	Church	1860-62	15 July 1976	SZ5694777853; 50°35′51″N 1°11′48″W	1343326	Holy Trinity Church More images
Lisle Combe	St Lawrence, Ventnor, Isle of Wight	Cottage Ornee	Early 19th century	15 July 1976	SZ5427576777; 50°35′18″N 1°14′05″W	1225493	Upload Photo
Madeira Hall Hotel	Ventnor, Isle of Wight	House	Circa 1800-1820	15 July 1976	SZ5713177910; 50°35′53″N 1°11′39″W	1075788	Upload Photo
Old Church of St Lawrence	St Lawrence, Ventnor, Isle of Wight	Church	12th century	30 March 1951	SZ5362776652; 50°35′14″N 1°14′38″W	1225276	Old Church of St Lawrence More images
The Cottage, St Lawrence Well	Ventnor, Isle of Wight	House	17th century or 18th century	15 July 1976	SZ5413176721; 50°35′16″N 1°14′12″W	1225494	Upload Photo
The Old Manor House	Ventnor, Isle of Wight	Farmhouse	Earlier building	30 March 1951	SZ5621277583; 50°35′43″N 1°12′26″W	1266597	Upload Photo
Coburg	Whippingham, Isle of Wight	Estate Cottage	c. 1853	17 August 1951	SZ5233993407; 50°44′17″N 1°15′35″W	1223080	Upload Photo
Church of St Edmund	Wootton Bridge, Isle of Wight	Church	13th century	1 October 1953	SZ5413892646; 50°43′51″N 1°14′03″W	1229657	Church of St Edmund More images
Freemantle Lodge Gateway to Appuldurcombe	Wroxall, Isle of Wight	Gate	Late 18th century	18 January 1967	SZ5403380767; 50°37′27″N 1°14′15″W	1292007	Freemantle Lodge Gateway to Appuldurcombe More images
Bugle Hotel	Yarmouth, Isle of Wight	Hotel	Late 16th century	18 January 1967	SZ3545689735; 50°42′22″N 1°29′57″W	1209437	Bugle Hotel More images
Church of St Swithin (old)	Yarmouth, Isle of Wight	Parish Church	13th century	21 July 1951	SZ3671189139; 50°42′03″N 1°28′54″W	1209421	Church of St Swithin (old) More images
Parish Church of St James	Yarmouth, Isle of Wight	Parish Church	Medieval	18 January 1967	SZ3546589663; 50°42′20″N 1°29′57″W	1209433	Parish Church of St James More images
The George Hotel	Yarmouth, Isle of Wight	House	1700-1710	18 January 1967	SZ3539089762; 50°42′23″N 1°30′01″W	1209432	The George Hotel More images
Thorley Manor	Thorley, Yarmouth, Isle of Wight	Manor House	c. 1712	18 January 1967	SZ3677089105; 50°42′02″N 1°28′51″W	1209424	Thorley Manor More images

== See also ==
- Grade I listed buildings on the Isle of Wight

Media related to Grade II* listed buildings on the Isle of Wight at Wikimedia Commons
