= Westcourt =

Westcourt may refer to:

- Westcourt, Callan, Co. Kilkenny, Ireland
- Westcourt, Queensland, a suburb of Cairns in Australia
- Westcourt, Wiltshire, a hamlet in England
- Westcourt Manor, a manor house on the Isle of Wight, England
