= God's Providence House =

God's Providence House may refer to:

- God's Providence House, Chester
- God's Providence House, Newport
