= Haseley Manor =

Haseley Manor may refer to:

- Haseley Manor (Isle of Wight)
- Haseley Manor (Warwickshire)
