= Northcourt Manor =

Manor house located on the Isle of Wight, England

Coordinates: 50°38′48″N 1°21′19″W

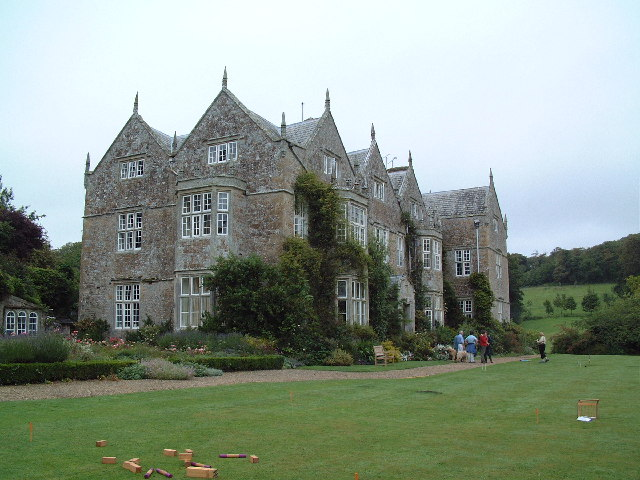
Northcourt Manor photographed in 2001

Northcourt Manor is one of three manor houses, along with Woolverton and Westcourt, that is located in Shorwell, on the Isle of Wight, England. It was begun by Sir John Leigh, Deputy Governor of the Island, in 1615, but was unfinished at his death. Northcourt is currently in use as a hotel.

== History ==
North Shorwell, or North Court, is referred to in the Domesday Book:

" Isd. rex ten. Sorewelle. Tres taini tenuer. in paragio et iii. aulas habuer. Tc. p. una hida et dim. modo p. iii. virg. Tra. e. iii. car. In dno. e. una car. et dim. et ii. vill, et viii. bord; cu. i. car. ibi vi. servi. Silva ad clausura. Val. et valuit iiii. lib."—[The King holds Shorwell. Three of the king's servants (or thegns) held it jointly, and had each his mansion. It was then assessed at one hide and a half, now at three virgates.- The land is three carucates. In the demesne there are one carucate and a half, and two villeins, and eight borderers. With one carucate there are six slaves. There is a wood for enclosure. It is, and was worth four pounds.]

From The History, Topography, and Antiquities of the Isle of Wight (1856):

This manor, with the other lands of the king's, went to Baldwin de Redvers, when he obtained the Lordship of the Island; and remained in that family until Amicia, Countess of Devon, bestowed it (temp. Henry iii.) upon the Abbey of Lacock, in Wiltshire. Her daughter, Isabella de Fortibus, (4th Edw. I.) confirmed the grant; and it is stated in the Record of the Liberties claimed by, and allowed to her, that the Abbess held of her one fee in capite, whence •he possessed in demesne the manor of Shorwell. In the 13th Edward III. the Abbey was charged to supply three men-at-arms, and two bowmen towards the defence of the Island.—On the Dissolution of the Religious Houses, the manor reverted to the Crown. It was in the possession of Thomas Temes, Esq., in the 2nd year of Elizabeth; and towards the close of her reign, was purchased by Richard Bull, Esq. [...]

The mansion-house was built by Sir John Leigh, in the reign of James I. After his death (in 1629, at age 83), it was completed by his son Barnaby Leigh. Extensive repairs and additions were made at a later period by Barnaby Eveleigh Leigh.

Willoughby Gordon (1772–1851) lived at Northcourt Manor. His son Sir Henry Percy Gordon, 2nd Baronet occupied it in 1856. The writer Mrs. Disney Leith was brought up here when Swinburne was her playmate. She married and lived here with her husband, General Colonel Robert William Disney Leith CB, until he died in 1892.

== Grounds ==
The grounds contain a spring, and the Shor Well which feeds a stream.

== Architecture and fittings ==
It is the largest ancient dwelling in the Isle of Wight. Modelled after larger houses on the mainland, it is of Jacobean style, and lies back from the road. An unusual feature is that it has only one wing. The entrance front has canted bays and mullioned windows. Sash windows were added in the 18th century, at which time a general internal remodelling on classic lines occurred. An extension was made to the north front in 1906 with the addition of a billiard room and offices.
