= Royal Arcade =

Royal Arcade can refer to a number of structures:

- Royal Arcade, Cardiff
- Royal Arcade, London
- Royal Arcade, Melbourne
- Royal Arcade, Newcastle upon Tyne
- Royal Arcade, Norwich
- Royal Victoria Arcade, Ryde
