= Borthwood Manor =

- Former names: Bourdourde
- Alternative names: Bordewode

General information
- Type: Manor house
- Location: Brading, United Kingdom

Borthwood Manor (also Bourdourde, 11th century; Bordewode, 14th century) is a manor house in the parish of Brading on the Isle of Wight.

== History ==
Borthwood, a small holding on the borders of Newchurch and Brading, was originally a wooded tract of far greater extent, and termed a forest. It appears among the lands of William son of Azor in Domesday, being held with Branston and Lessland. Borthwood seems frequently to have been granted with the lordship of the Island, and belonged to Piers Gaveston in 1309, and to the Earl of Chester in 1316. In 1415 it was granted with the lordship to Philippa, Duchess of York, and in 1507 paid a fee-farm rent of 66s. 8d. to the Crown. Borthwood afterwards seems to have become annexed to the manor of Thorley, for in 1587–8 'the farm of the manor of Brodewood parcel of the manor of Thorley with Brodewood' was leased for twenty-one years to Thomas Keys. (fn. 162) In 1780 Robert Worsley paid the Crown a rent for tithes in Borthwood. Borthwood in 1820 was owned by Sir W. G. Stirling, who acquired it probably by his marriage with Susannah daughter of George T. Goodenough of Borthwood, and in 1912 it was held by Mr. W. G. Stirling.
