= Newport Law Courts, Isle of Wight =

Court building in Newport, Isle of Wight, England

Newport Law Courts
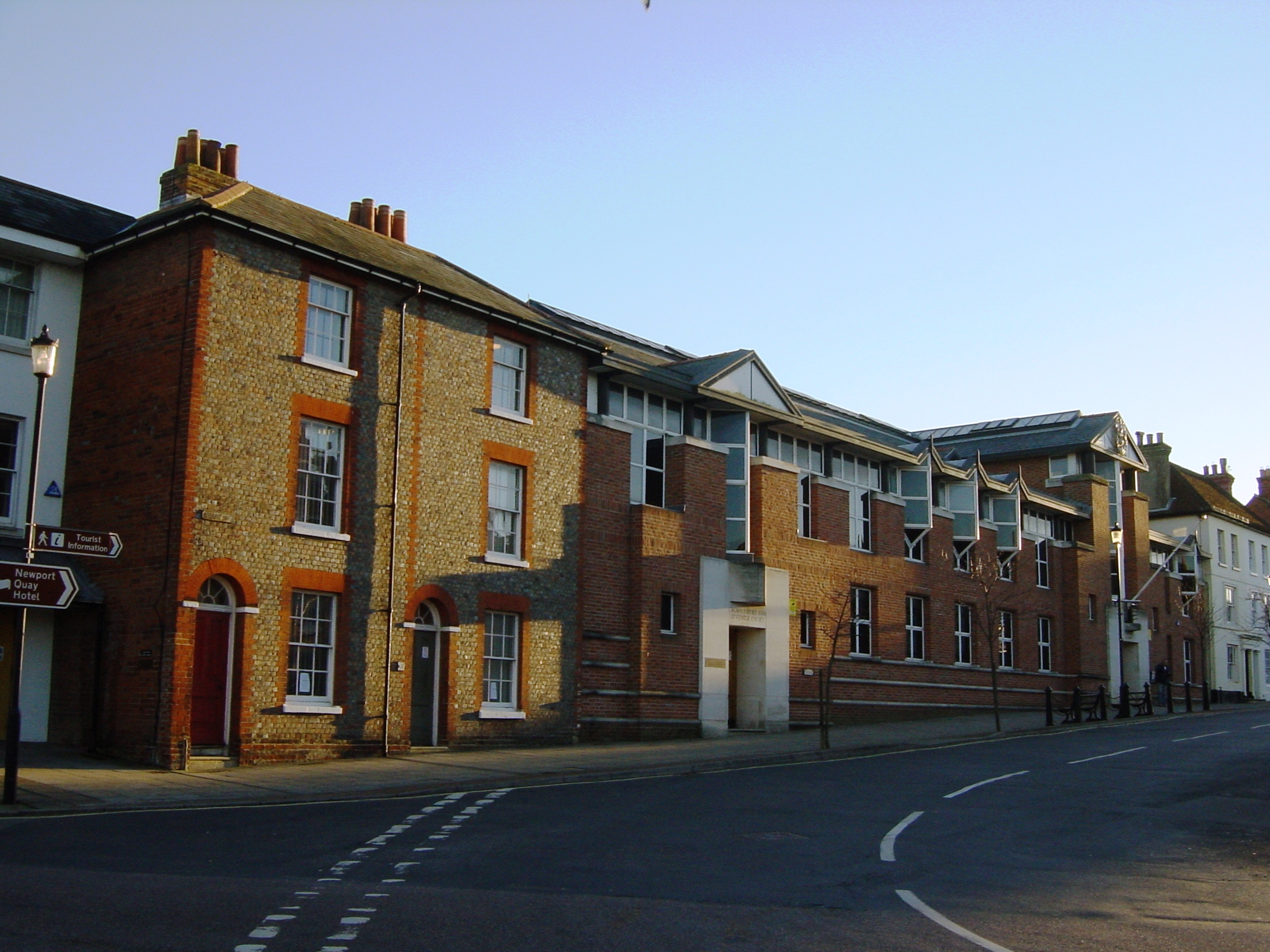
- Newport Law Courts

- Shown on the Isle of Wight
- 50.7012°N 1.2916°W
- Location: Quay Street, Newport, Isle of Wight

History
- Built: 1994

Site notes
- Architect: Rainey Petrie Architecture
- Architectural style: Modernist style

Newport Law Courts, also known as the Isle of Wight Combined Court Centre, is a Crown Court venue which deals with criminal cases, as well as a County Court, which deals with civil cases, in Quay Street, Newport, Isle of Wight, England. It also accommodates the local magistrates' court.

== History ==
Until the early 1990s, criminal court trials were held in Newport Guildhall. However, as the number of court cases in Newport grew, it became necessary to commission a more modern courthouse for criminal matters. The site selected by the Lord Chancellor's Department had been occupied by a row of private houses: No. 1 Quay Street had been the home of Henry Mew, a director of the brewery, Mew Langton & Company. There was a bottling store at the back of the house, which was one of the support buildings for the main brewery building on The Quay.

The new building was designed by Rainey Petrie Architecture in the Modernist style, built in red brick at a cost of £3.4 million, and was completed in 1994. The design involved an asymmetrical main frontage of nine bays facing onto Quay Street. The third bay from the right, which, unlike the rest of the main frontage, was three storeys high rather than two storeys, featured a double-doorway with a stone architrave on the ground floor and a projecting triangular window spanning the first and second floors, all surmounted by a pediment with a Royal coat of arms in the tympanum. The second bay from the left contained an entrance in a similar style but the projecting triangular window only spanned the first floor. The other bays were fenestrated by square casement windows on the ground floor and by a mixture of casement and projecting triangular windows on the first floor. Internally, the building was laid out to accommodate four courtrooms.

Notable cases have been the trial and conviction of Graham Medway, in October 2020, for sex offences which included the rape of a three-year-old child.
