= Newport Guildhall, Isle of Wight =

Municipal building in Newport, Isle of Wight, England

Newport Guildhall
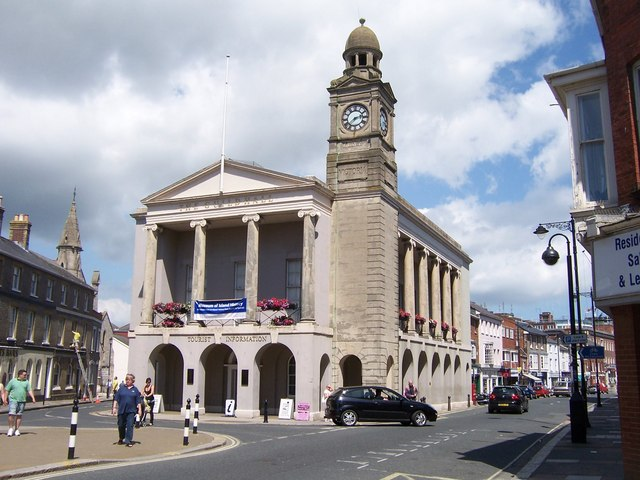
- Newport Guildhall

- Shown on the Isle of Wight
- 50.7004°N 1.2931°W
- Location: High Street, Newport

History
- Built: 1816

Site notes
- Architect: John Nash
- Architectural style: Neoclassical style

Listed Building – Grade II*
- Official name: The Guildhall
- Designated: 1 October 1953
- Reference no.: 1278563

Newport Guildhall is a municipal structure in the High Street in Newport, Isle of Wight, England. The guildhall, which was the headquarters of Newport Borough Council, is a Grade II* listed building.

== History ==
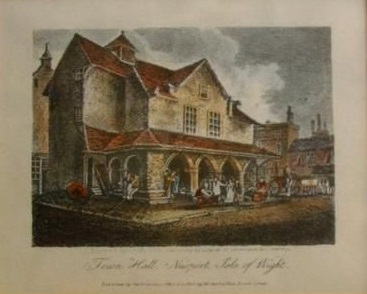
The old town hall in Newport

The first municipal building in Newport was the audit house, built in 1405-6, which stood on the High Street between Watchbell Lane and Holyrood Street. It was built of Flemish brick and included a courtroom on the upper floor, with a wood-panelled interior, and two shops below. In 1608 the town was incorporated as a borough, and in 1639 the mayor and corporation rebuilt the audit house on the same site, this time in Portland stone. It was arcaded on the ground floor, so that markets could be held, and had an assembly room on the first floor. In the early 19th century civic leaders decided to procure a new building on a site just to the east of the original building.

The new building was designed by John Nash in the neoclassical style and rendered with stucco. It was designed to serve as a market hall, civic building and courthouse (for the Quarter Sessions, Petty Sessions and Borough Courts); the foundation stone was laid on 20 March 1814, and the building was completed in 1816. The design involved a symmetrical main frontage with three bays facing west onto Quay Street, made up of a tetrastyle portico with Ionic order columns on the first floor supporting an entablature and a dentilled pediment. There were sash windows on the first floor; on the south front, facing the High Street, these were recessed behind a colonnade with iron railings at the front. The ground floor was arcaded on the north, west and south sides, which gave access to the market hall (which occupied the entire ground floor apart from two enclosed staircases on the north side). Internally, the principal rooms were on the first floor: a Council Chamber/Grand Jury Room to the west, and a larger Town Hall/Court Room to the east (a partition between the two could be opened, when required, to turn them into one large hall for public gatherings). To the north was the town clerk's office, and other rooms on an upper floor.

In 1843 a bracket clock and bellcote were added on the High Street side (it was a chiming clock, made by John Moore & Sons of Clerkenwell). This was superseded in 1887-8 when a clock tower with a cupola was erected at the southwest corner of the building to celebrate Golden Jubilee of Queen Victoria; the architect was Robert Braxton Perres. The clock reused the 1843 mechanism, but the quarter-chime was removed as there was only room for one bell.

A weekly market was still being held in 1888, but not long afterwards the open ground floor began to be enclosed. At the turn of the century part of the former market hall was serving as the town's fire station; by 1930 it was also serving as an ambulance station.

The building continued to serve as the headquarters of Newport Borough Council until 1967, when it was converted to serve as the island's main law courts (providing accommodation for the Crown Court, County Court and Magistrates' Court): a new courtroom was created on the ground floor, and an extension to the east provided space for additional court-related facilities. Lord Denning, the Master of the Rolls, opened the refurbished building on 21 September 1968.

Newport Council and its successor Medina Borough Council, were subsequently based at the former town clerk's office at 17 Quay Street in Newport, but, by the mid-1980s, civic leaders increasingly operated from the more substantial facilities at Northwood House in Cowes. After the construction of Newport Law Courts in Quay Street in 1994, the building was no longer required as a judiciary facility; instead, it was a converted for use a tourist information office and the Museum of Island History was established in the building in 1996. The museum's collection was formed from archaeological material previously held by the Carisbrooke Castle Museum, but, since then, it has inherited or purchased other collections covering all aspects of the island's history from its geological origins to the present day.

Works of art in the guildhall include a portrait of the Italian political leader, Giuseppe Garibaldi, who visited Brook House, the home of the politician, Charles Seely, in 1864.

== See also ==
- Grade II* listed buildings on the Isle of Wight
