= Kingston, Isle of Wight =

Coordinates: 50°37′47″N 01°19′28″W

Kingston
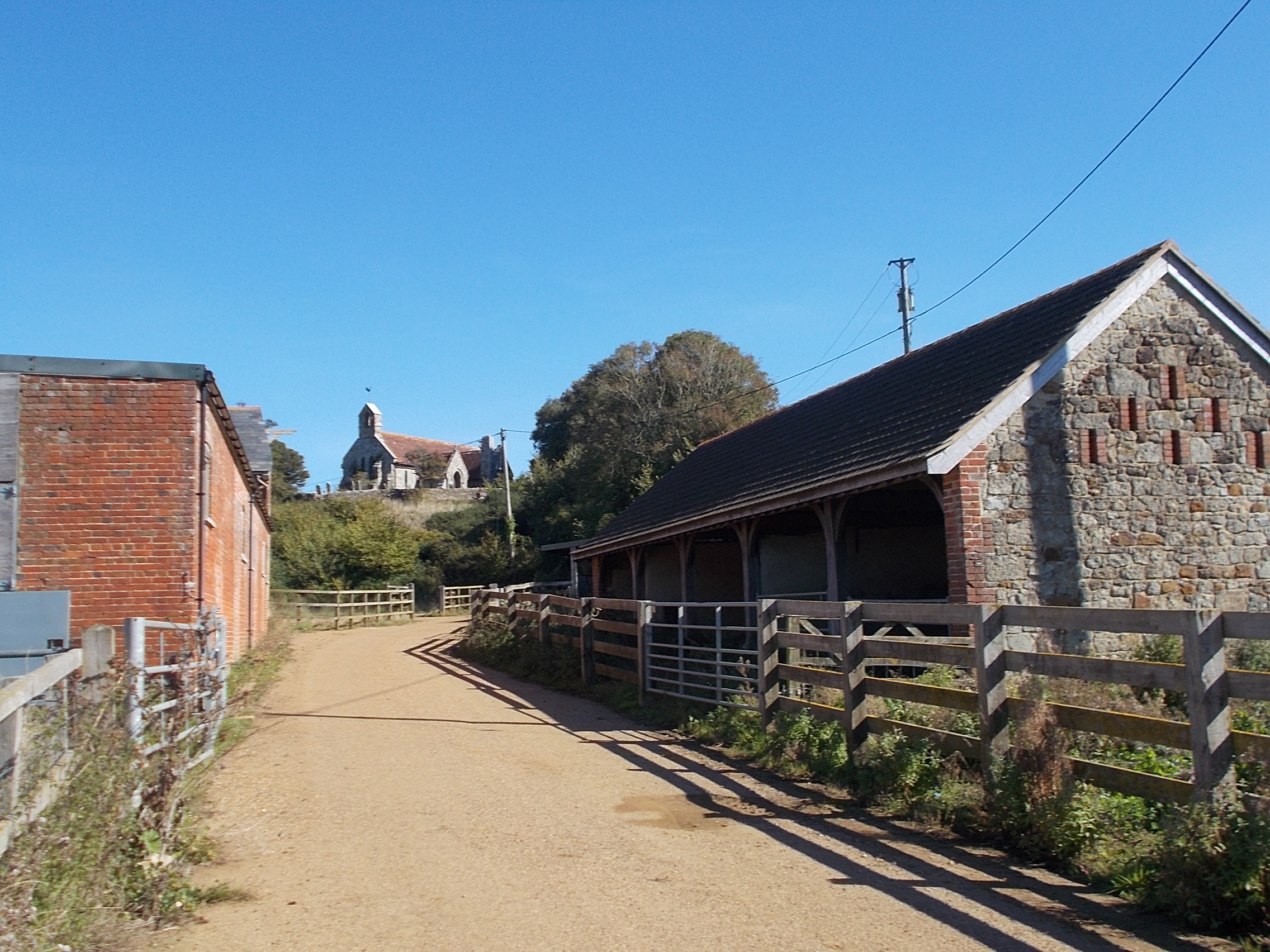

- Location within the Isle of Wight
- OS grid reference: SZ47968130
- Civil parish: Shorwell
- Unitary authority: Isle of Wight
- Ceremonial county: Isle of Wight
- Region: South East
- Country: England
- Sovereign state: United Kingdom
- Post town: Newport
- Postcode district: PO30
- Dialling code: 01983
- Police: Hampshire and Isle of Wight
- Fire: Hampshire and Isle of Wight
- Ambulance: Isle of Wight
- UK Parliament: Isle of Wight West

Kingston is a small settlement and former civil parish, now in the parish of Shorwell, on the Isle of Wight, England, located 5 miles southwest of Newport in the southwest of the island, an area known as the Back of the Wight. In 1931 the parish had a population of 50. On 1 April 1933 the parish was abolished and merged with Shorwell.

Formerly a separate Anglican parish, with its own parish church, St. James' Church, Kingston is now amalgamated with the adjacent Anglican parish of Shorwell, as Shorwell with Kingston.
