= Great East Standen Manor =

Coordinates: 50°40′51″N 1°15′30″W

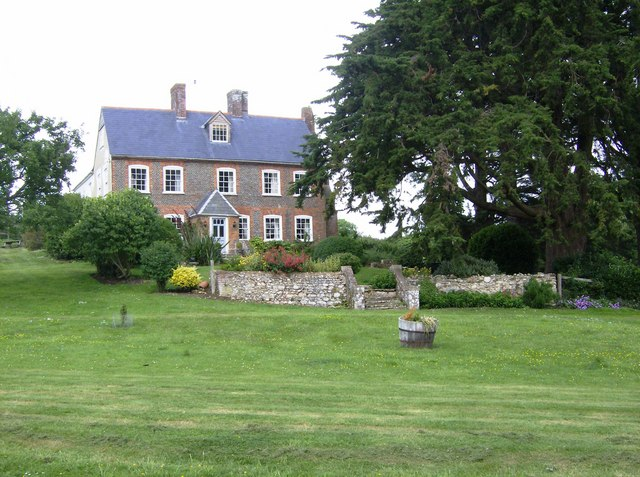
Great East Standen Manor in 2007

Great East Standen Manor is a manor house on the Isle of Wight, England. Its history dates to the Norman Conquest; and it was allegedly once the residence of Princess Cicely, the daughter of Edward IV, following her third marriage to Sir Thomas. The front is 18th-century and includes five bays that are irregularly spaced. Grey headers and red brick dressings are featured, as are windows with slightly segmental tops and a large chimneystack, dated 1768. The 18th-century Standen House is nearby.
