= Church of St Mary and St Radegund, Whitwell =

Church on the Isle of Wight, England

Coordinates: 50°35′50″N 01°15′51″W

Church of St. Mary and St. Radegund, Whitwell
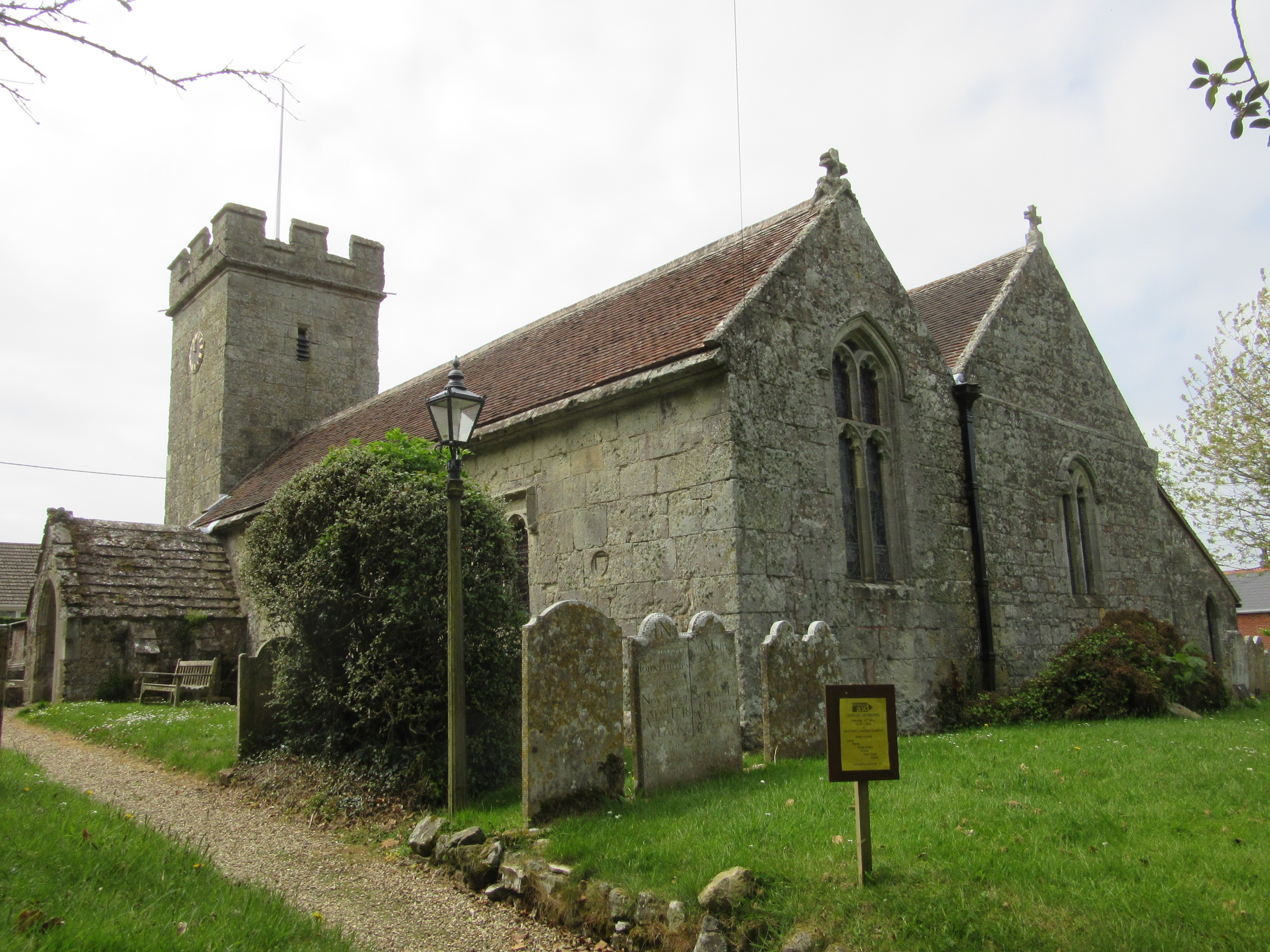
- Church of St. Mary and St. Radegund, Whitwell
- Church of St. Mary and St. Radegund, Whitwell
- Denomination: Church of England
- Churchmanship: Broad Church

History
- Dedication: St. Mary and St. Radegund

Administration
- Province: Canterbury
- Diocese: Portsmouth
- Parish: Whitwell, Isle of Wight

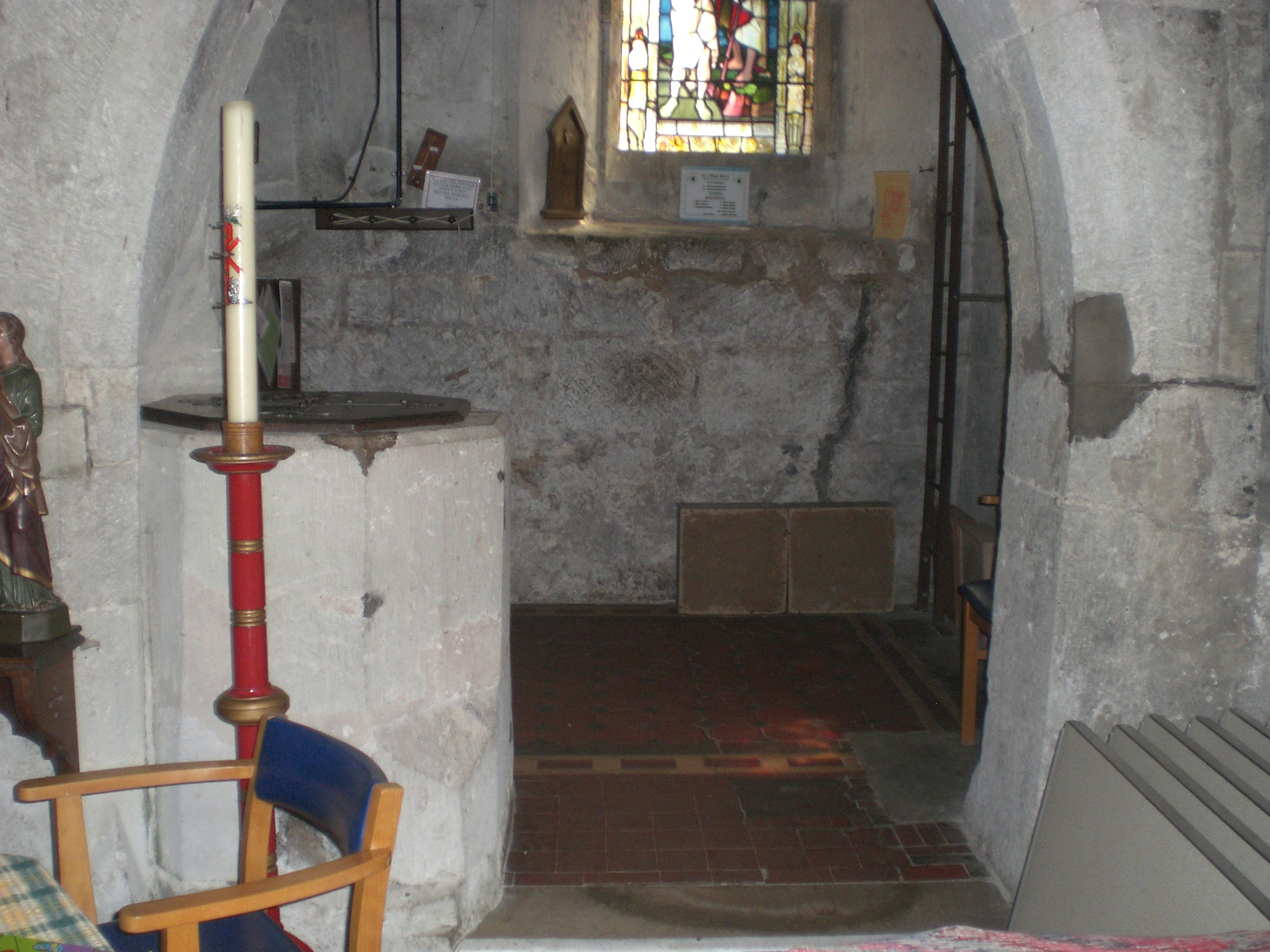
The bell tower and location of the post office

The Church of St. Mary and St. Radegund, Whitwell is a parish church in the Church of England located in Whitwell on the Isle of Wight.

== History ==
The church is medieval.

The Church of St. Mary and St. Radegund in Whitwell is located on rising ground at the South end of the village and adjoins the rectory.

Various parts of the church date back to different centuries. Various portions of the church were constructed in the 12th, 13th 15th and 16th centuries. However, the church has some more modern parts as well.

The church consists of a nave which has a south aisle of three bays, a chancel with south aisle in alignment with the east wall, a western tower and a south porch. Looking at the church, it is evident that the original church did not have aisles, and had a narrow chancel, divided by an arch. A narrow south aisle was added in the 13th century which was later widened in the 16th century. When the church was originally formed, it was of two separate manorial chapels. The bells and clock were installed after the death of William Spindler who passed them on to the church, and is now buried in its graveyard. All the bells have the inscription "Cast by John Warner and Sons London 1889". In 2009 the bells underwent a refurbishment by Whitechapel Bell Foundry at a cost of more than £30,000. The refurbishment came along with the 120th anniversary of their installation in 1889. The refurbishment was commemorated in the well dressing celebrations that occur annually in the Summer.

The churchyard also contains the Commonwealth war grave of a Hampshire Regiment soldier of World War I.

On Monday 16 April 2007 Whitwell's Post Office re-opened inside the church's bell tower. Although other post offices have been relocated to new locations on the grounds of local churches, it was the first of its kind in the country to be located inside the church. The idea to locate the new post office inside the church came from the church's vicar, after no other suitable location was found. After the Post Office's relocation into the church proved a success, the island's Rural Community Council (RRC) stated they would like to see the model applied elsewhere where village amenities were under threat. Although the post office was also hoped to boost attendance numbers at Sunday church services, this did not happen, with average congregation size remaining at only 23.

== Organ ==
The pipe organ dates from 1860 by the builder Bevington, but has undergone renovation and extension by Harrison and Harrison in 1899. A specification of the organ can be found on the National Pipe Organ Register.

== Gallery ==
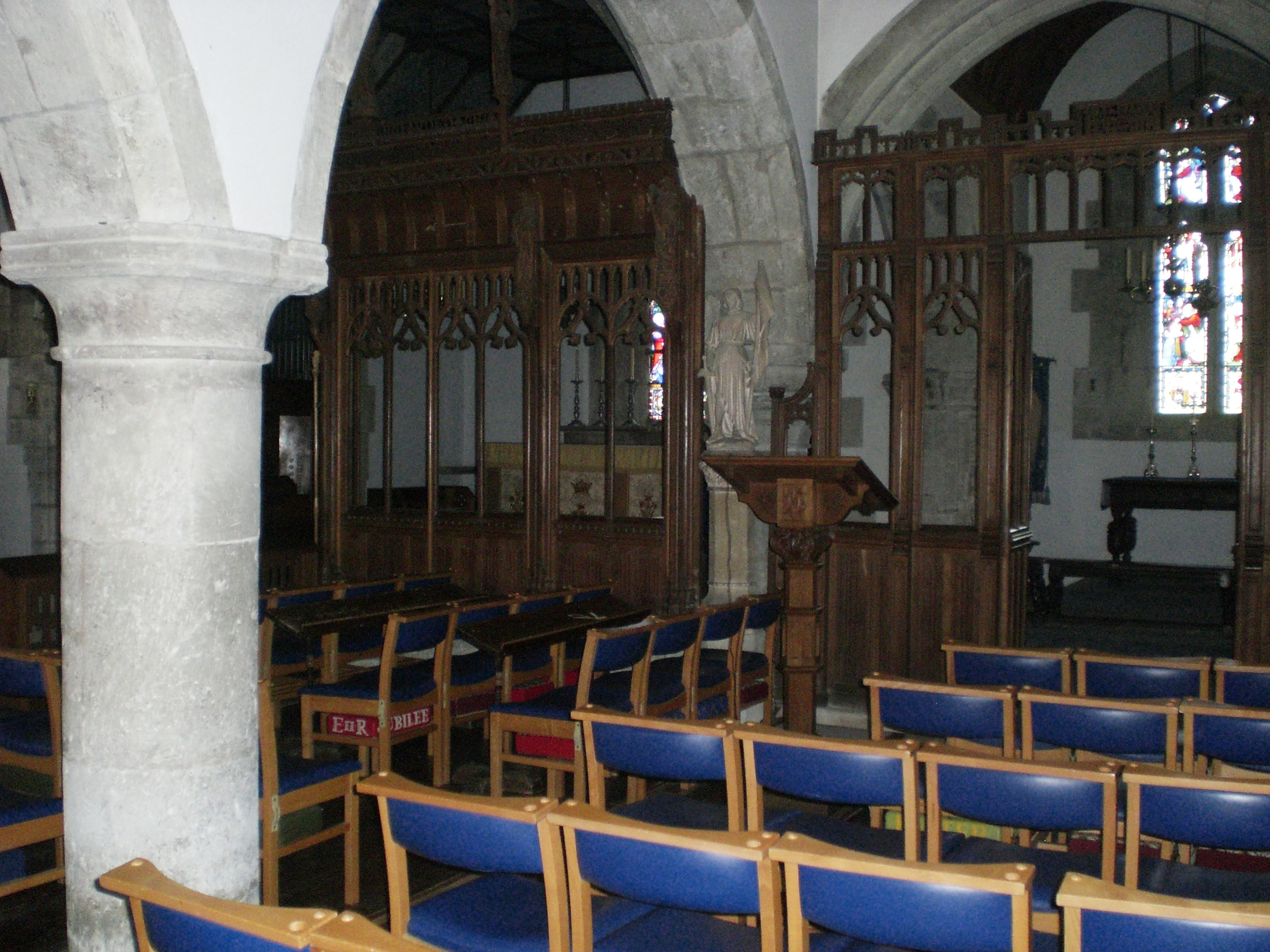
The interior of the Church.

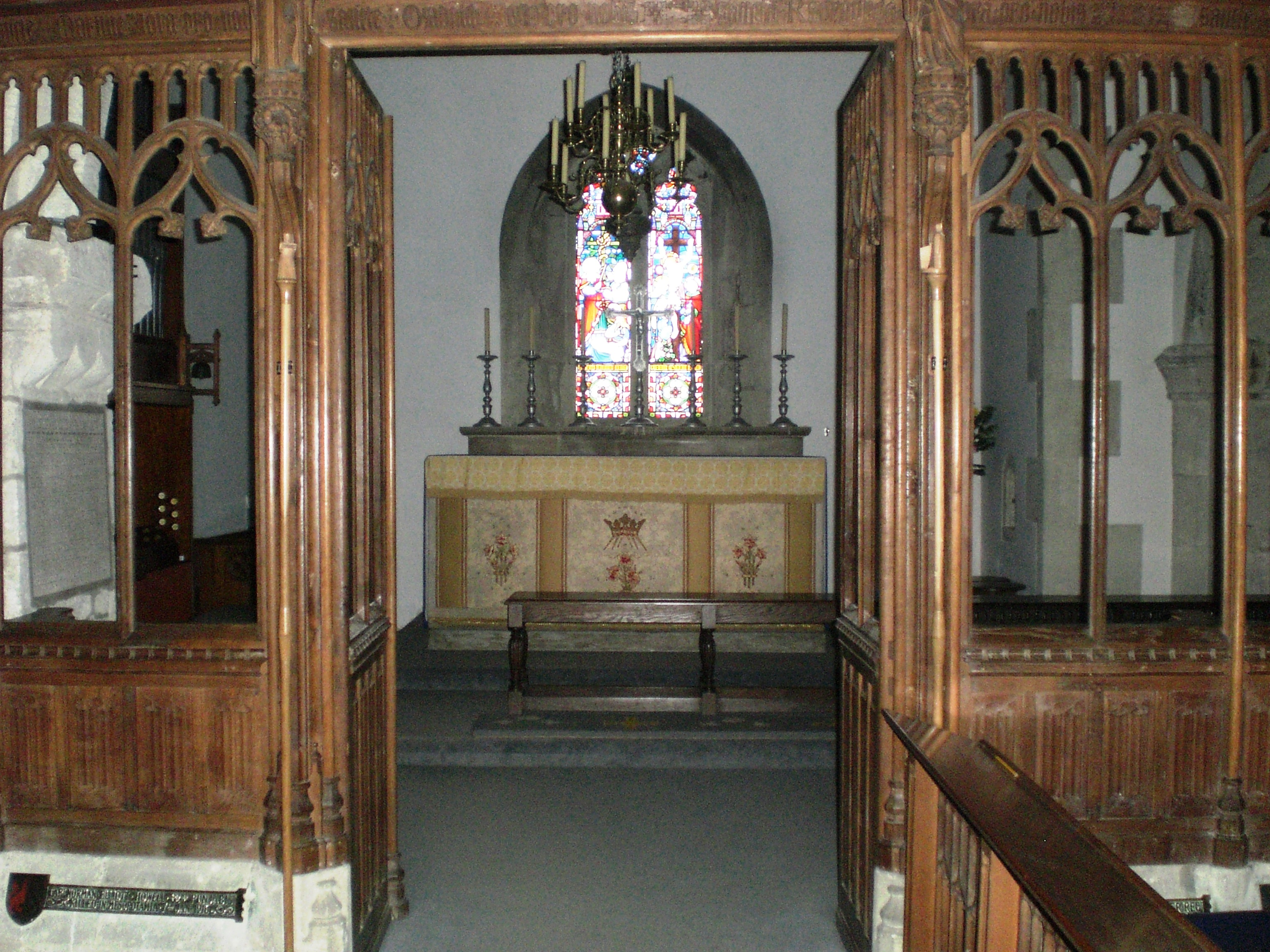
The altar.

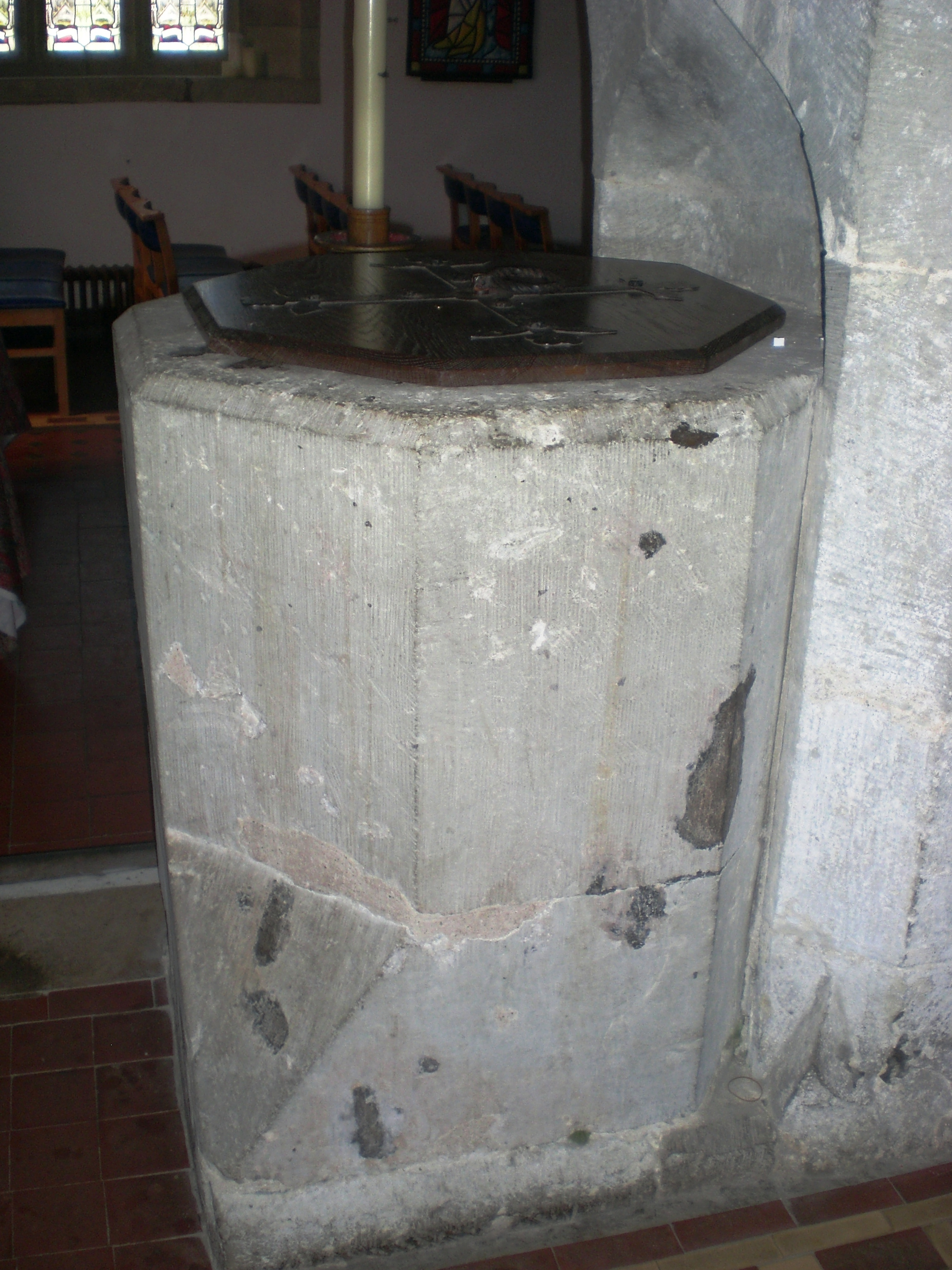
The font.

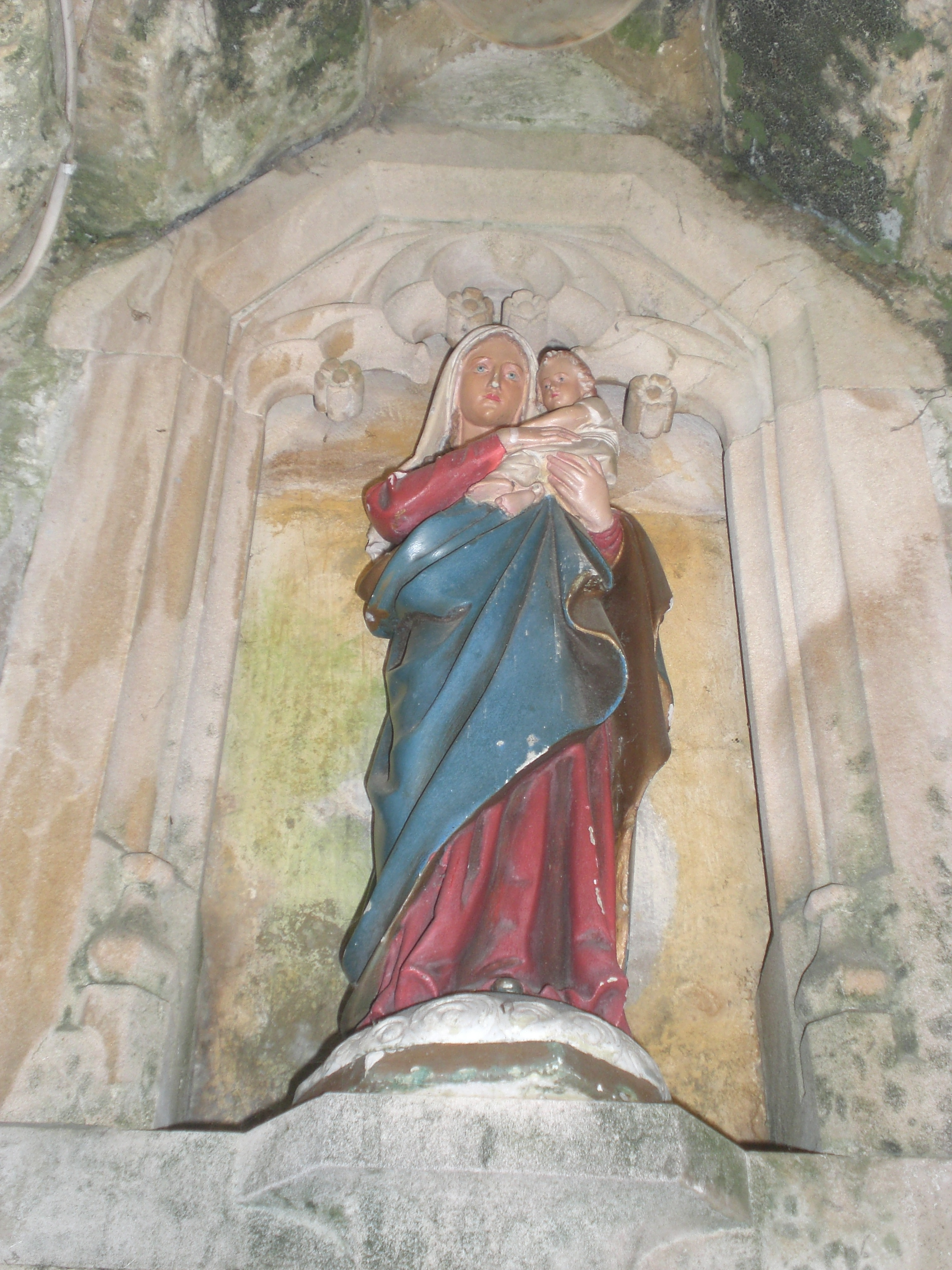
A statue of St. Mary.

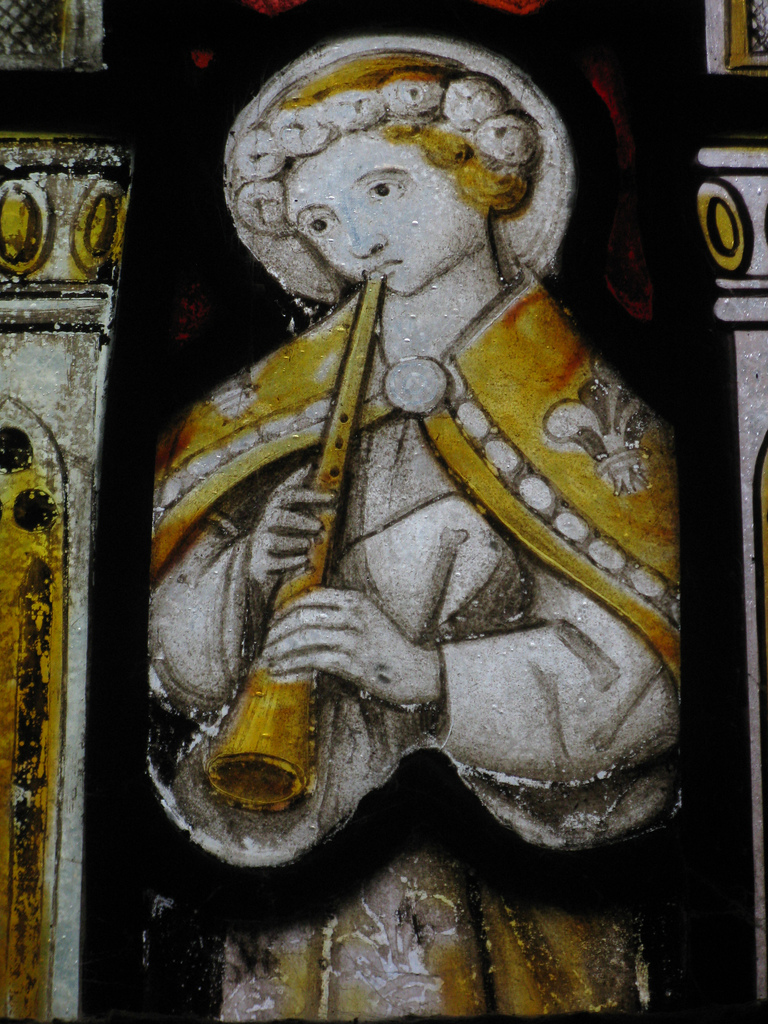
An angel musician in one of the windows.
