= St James' Church, Kingston =

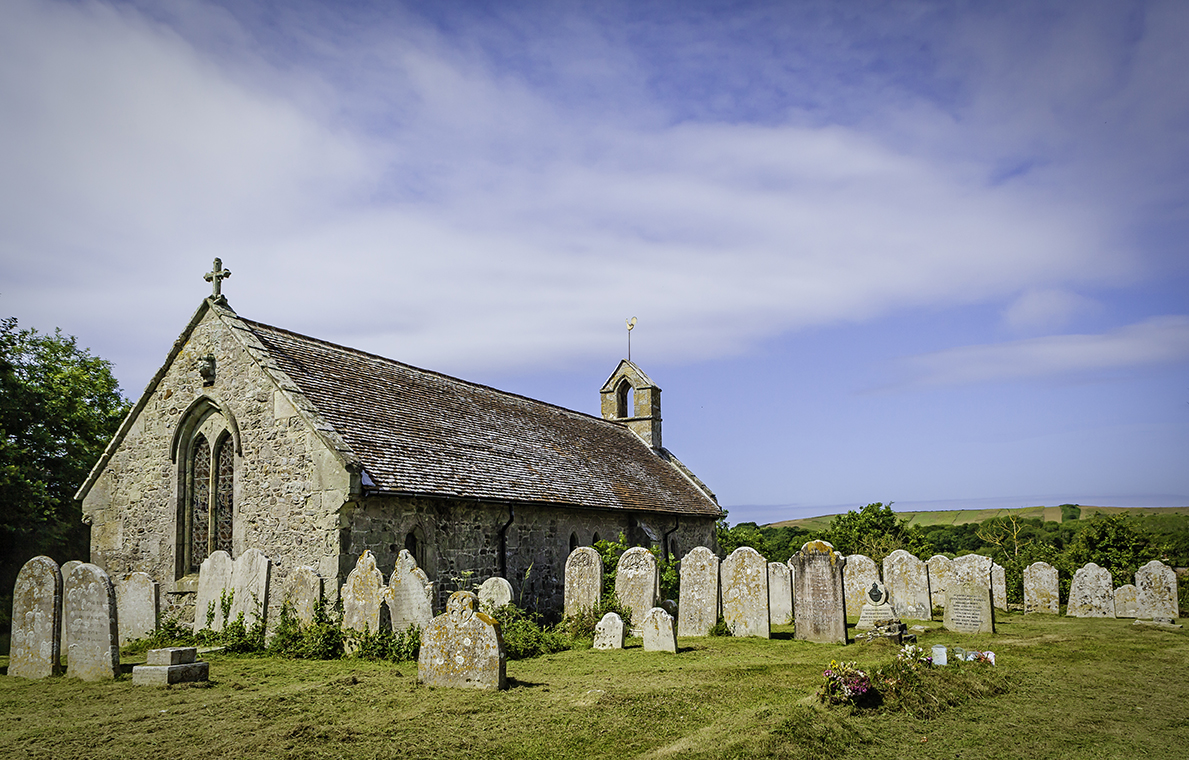
- St James' Church, Kingston
- 50°37′47″N 01°19′28″W
- Denomination: Church of England
- Churchmanship: Broad Church

History
- Dedication: St James

Administration
- Province: Canterbury
- Diocese: Portsmouth
- Parish: Kingston, Isle of Wight

St James' Church, Kingston is a parish church in the Church of England located in Kingston, Isle of Wight. Formerly a separate Anglican parish, Kingston is now amalgamated with the adjacent Anglican parish of Shorwell, as Shorwell with Kingston.

== History ==
The church was re-built by the architect R.J. Jones in 1892.

The church ... stands on a knoll overlooking the manor-house to the south of the Shorwell road, and remains much as it was built in the latter part of the 13th century. It is a plain rectangular structure without a dividing chancel arch, and of the original features only the double hollow lancet windows in the north and south walls, (fn. 45) the lower portion of the east window and a trefoiled credence in the south wall remain. In the 15th century windows and a south door were inserted, and to this period belong the corbels over the east and west windows. (fn. 46) In 1766 a porch was built to the south door, and in 1872 a vestry was added and the 15th-century windows replaced by lancets. There is a good 16th-century brass (fn. 47) to Richard Meux, 1535, with his arms.
