= Standen House =

Country house on the Isle of Wight, England

Coordinates: 50°40′54″N 1°17′02″W

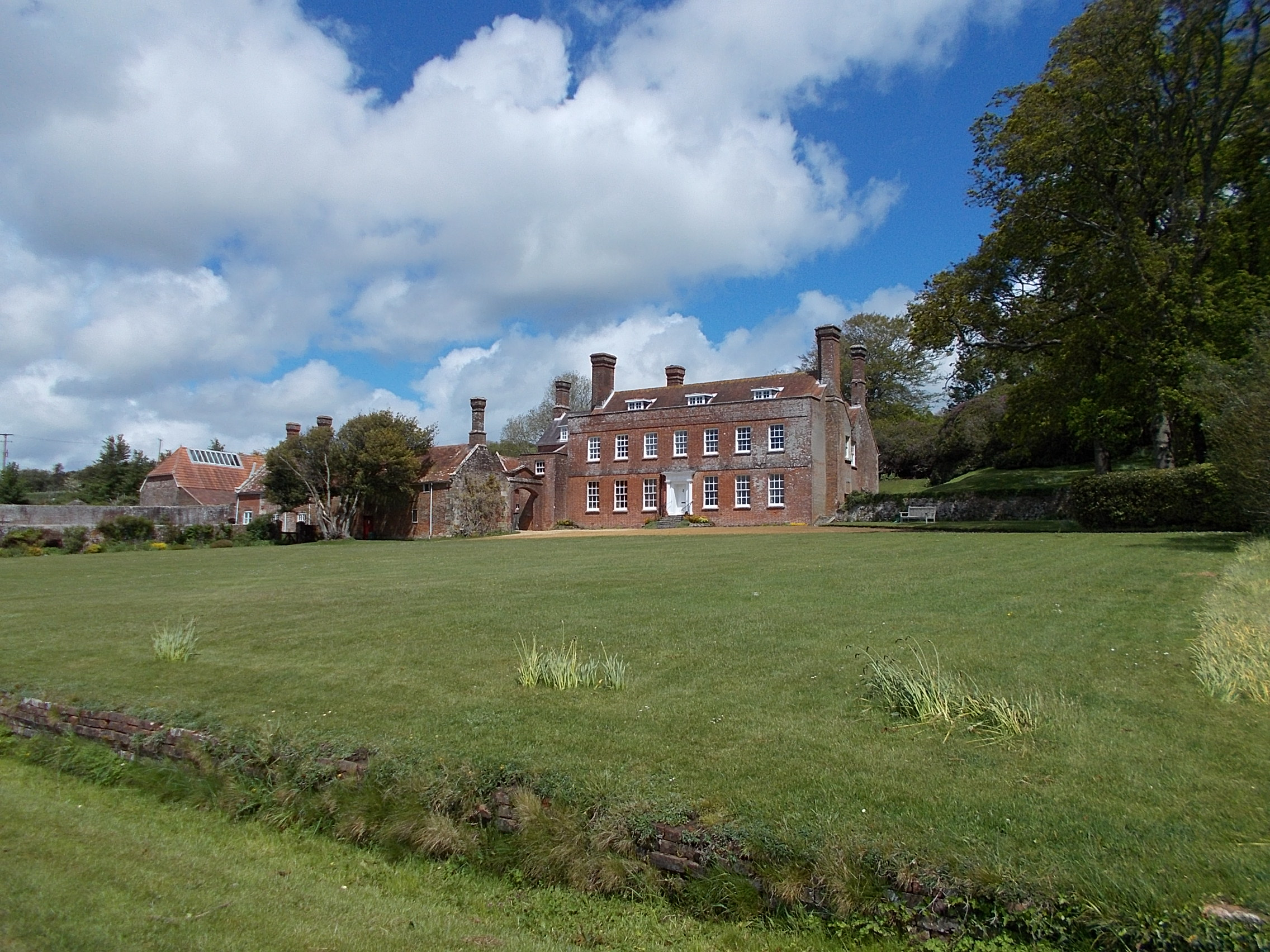
Standen House in 2021

Standen House is an English country house located 1 mile (1.6 km) south of Newport, Isle of Wight. The 18th-century house has a brick front and features seven-bay windows, a porch with Doric columns, and triglyph frieze. Made of brick, it is located at the base of Pan Down. Adjacent is the park of Gatcombe, which itself lies in a valley which includes the winding River Medina. Gatcombe House lies opposite Standen House, separated by the river and woods. Great East Standen Manor is nearby.
