= Osborne Stable Block =

Building in East Cowes, Isle of Wight, England

Coordinates: 50.749223°N 1.274593°W

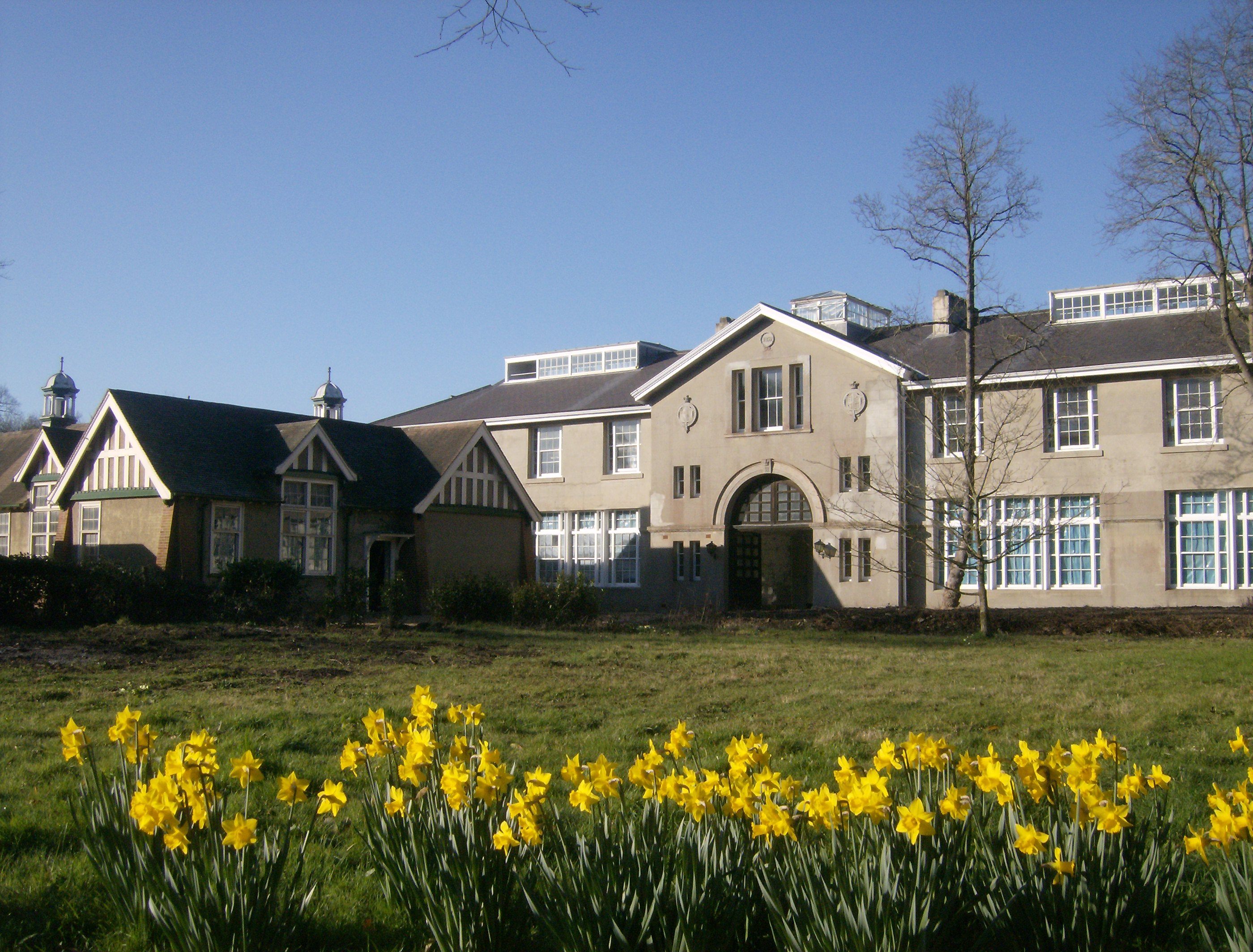
Stable Block entrance

Osborne Stable Block was built in 1859 on the old cricket ground in the grounds of Osborne House, the former royal residence in East Cowes, Isle of Wight, England. It is a Grade II* listed building.

== History ==
Osborne had been built between 1845 and 1851 for Queen Victoria and Prince Albert as a summer home and rural retreat. The estate outgrew the former house stables and in 1859 Prince Albert designed the current Stable Block Quadrangle himself. The builder was Thomas Cubitt, the London architect and builder whose company built the main façade of Buckingham Palace for the royal couple in 1847.

The stables were constructed to a quadrangular floor plan of rendered brick with a state roof. A central 2 storey entrance pavilion with an arched entrance is flanked on both sides by two storey (formerly one storey) wings of 8 bays.

=== The Royal Naval College, Osborne ===
Queen Victoria died in January 1901. Following her death, Osborne house became surplus to royal requirements and was given by King Edward VII to the state with a few rooms retained as a private royal museum dedicated to Queen Victoria. In 1903, part of the estate, the Stable Block being the hub, became a junior officer training college for the Royal Navy known as the Royal Naval College, Osborne. Initial training began at the age of 13, and further studies were continued at the Royal Naval College, Dartmouth. The College closed in 1921, with the last students leaving on 9 April 1921.

Former students included Queen Victoria's great-grandsons, the future Edward VIII and George VI, and their younger brother George, Duke of Kent. Another well-known alumnus of the college was Jack Llewelyn Davies, one of the five Llewelyn Davies boys who inspired J. M. Barrie's Peter Pan. Davies — whose brothers all went to Eton — described his five years at Osborne as horrendous. The case of George Archer-Shee from 1908, who was expelled from Osborne after being falsely accused of stealing a 5-shilling postal order, inspired the play The Winslow Boy.

=== The VADS ===
In 1927 the Red Cross voluntary aid detachment nurses from all over the United Kingdom were allowed to use the old naval college buildings for their summer training camp. In 1934 the camps stopped as the former naval college dormitory blocks were being demolished.

=== Saunders Roe Ltd ===
In 1942 the Stable Block was commandeered by the Government for the war effort to provide a Head Office and design/drawing offices for Saunders Roe Ltd. At the end of the war the company took out a long lease with the Crown Estates. The company and its successors operated there for forty-five years. The products that emerged from the work undertaken there included the largest aeroplane in the world in its time, the only jet-powered seaplane, the fastest aircraft of its time, the first and largest Hovercraft, development of the nation's only successful space vehicle, components for the fastest car in the world. During 1942 part of the Stable Block was bombed.

=== Fall into disrepair ===
From 1987 until 1999 the Stable Block fell into disrepair and most of the buildings became semi derelict.

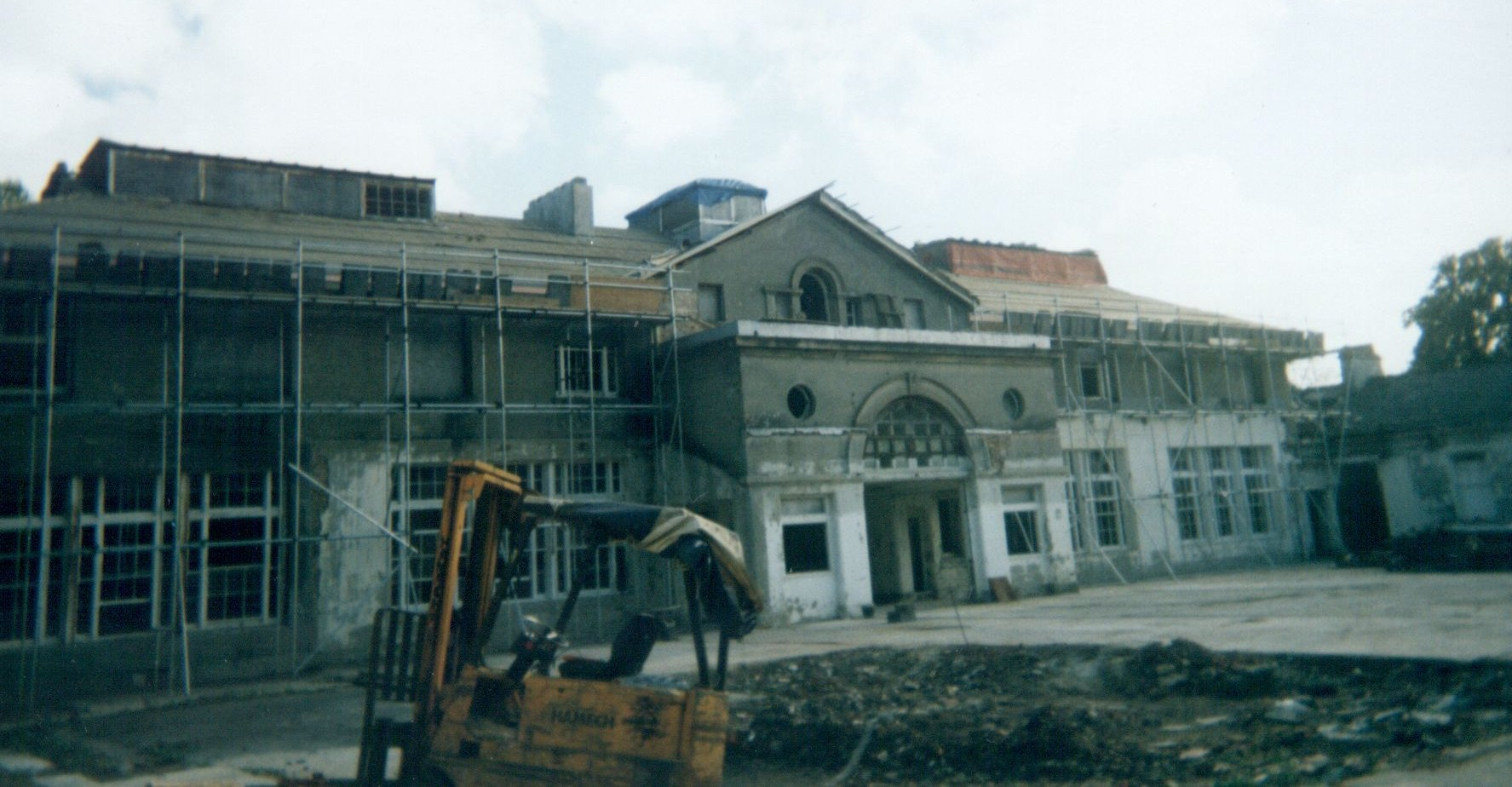
Classrooms from courtyard

=== Vectis Storage & Business centre ===
In 1999 Mr & Mrs Harrison obtained a long lease from the Crown Estates and operated their storage business from one of the usable buildings. Part of their agreement with the Crown estates was to bring the Stable Block up to a good state of repair. Since 1999 the Stable Block and surrounding buildings have been transformed into a small business park. The Stable Block and quadrangle have been greatly restored and it is hoped will continue to make history during this century.
