= St James' Church, Yarmouth =

Coordinates: 50.705544°N 1.499133°W

St. James' Church, Yarmouth
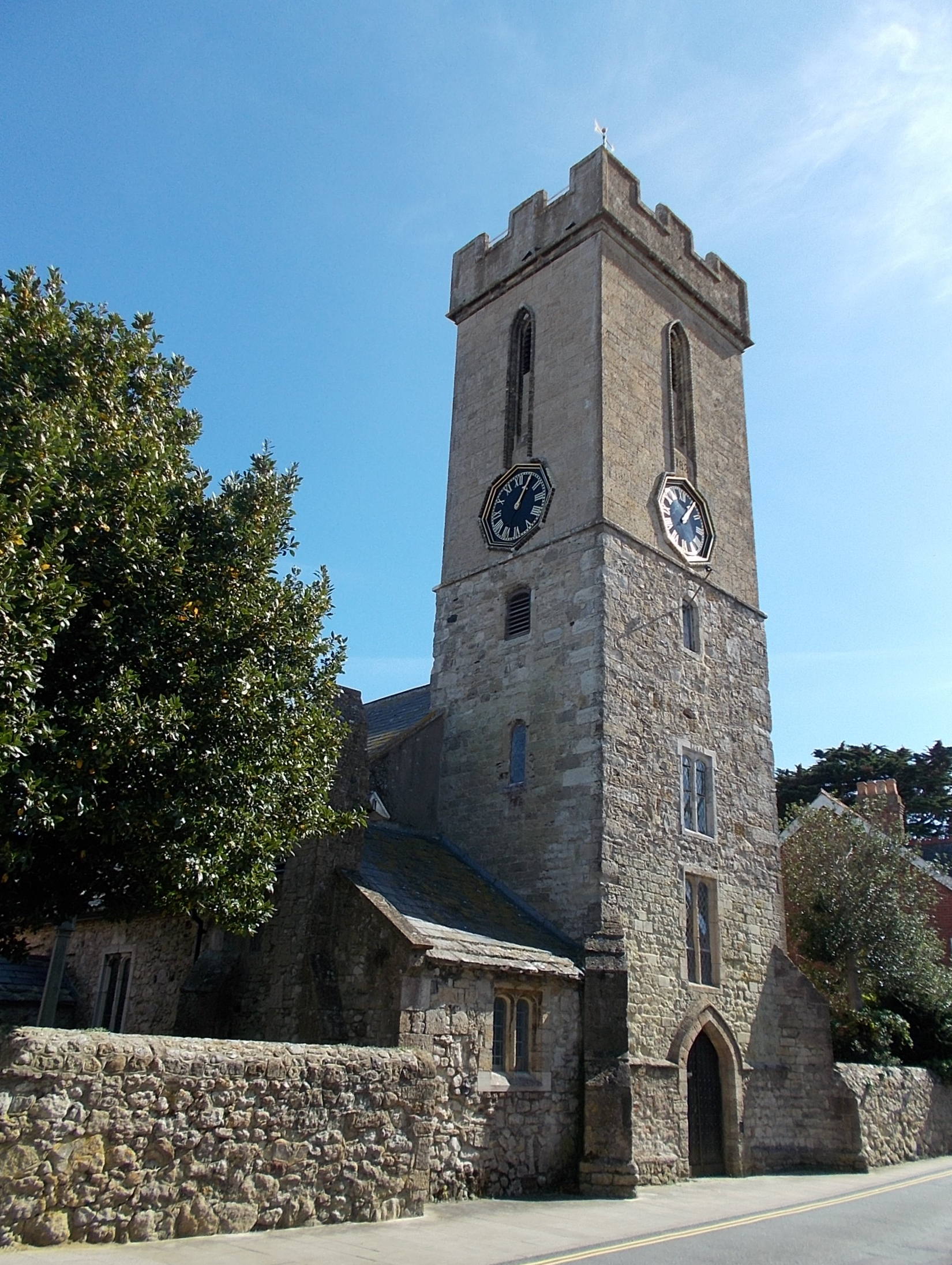
- St. James' Church, Yarmouth
- St. James' Church, Yarmouth
- Denomination: Church of England
- Churchmanship: Broad Church

History
- Dedication: St. James

Administration
- Province: Canterbury
- Diocese: Portsmouth
- Parish: Yarmouth, Isle of Wight

St. James' Church, Yarmouth is a Grade II* listed parish church in the Church of England located in Yarmouth, Isle of Wight.

== History ==
The church foundation is medieval but little remains. Rebuilding began in 1635.

There is a monument to the seventeenth-century admiral Sir Robert Holmes who based his operations at Yarmouth. He obtained it in a raid on a French ship, when he seized an unfinished statue of Louis XIV of France and forced the sculptor to finish it with his own head rather than the king's. However, in the opinion of the author of the guidebook available at the church, this is a legend and "It is only fair to say that the face bears more resemblance to King Louis than to the known portraits of Sir Robert."

The church consists of nave with north and south aisles, a chancel and a western tower. The original church was said by local tradition to have been at the east end of the town, and its foundations were visible in the old churchyard in 1845. Destroyed by the French in their raid of 1377, it is said to have been rebuilt on the present site only to be again reduced to a ruin in 1543. At the beginning of the 17th century it was practically rebuilt, and reconsecrated by John Davenant the Bishop of Salisbury on 11 March 1626. The chancel, which had a polygonal roof with enriched bosses at the intersection of the ribs, was lengthened by 12 ft. in 1889.

To the south of it is the little mortuary chapel containing a fine statue of Sir Robert Holmes, died 1692, and many memorials to the Holmes family. There is a wall tablet by Nollekens to Captain John Urry, 1802, and in the floor are 17th-century grave slabs of the Hide family and to Peter Pryavlx, 1644. On the front of the gallery at the west end are brass tablets commemorating the different charitable bequests, and in the north aisle is the royal achievement of King George I, 1715.

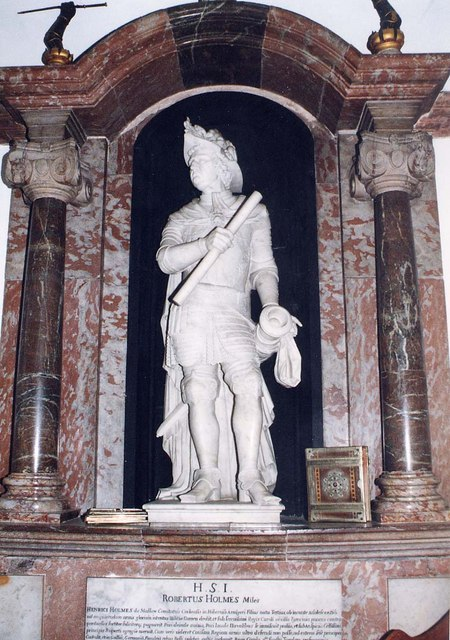
Statue of Sir Robert Holmes

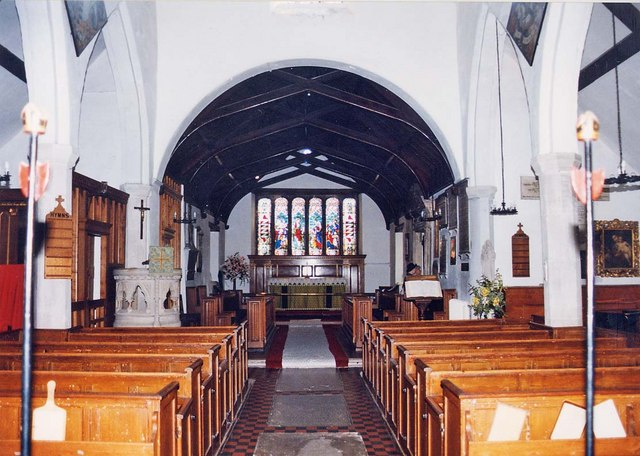
The east end

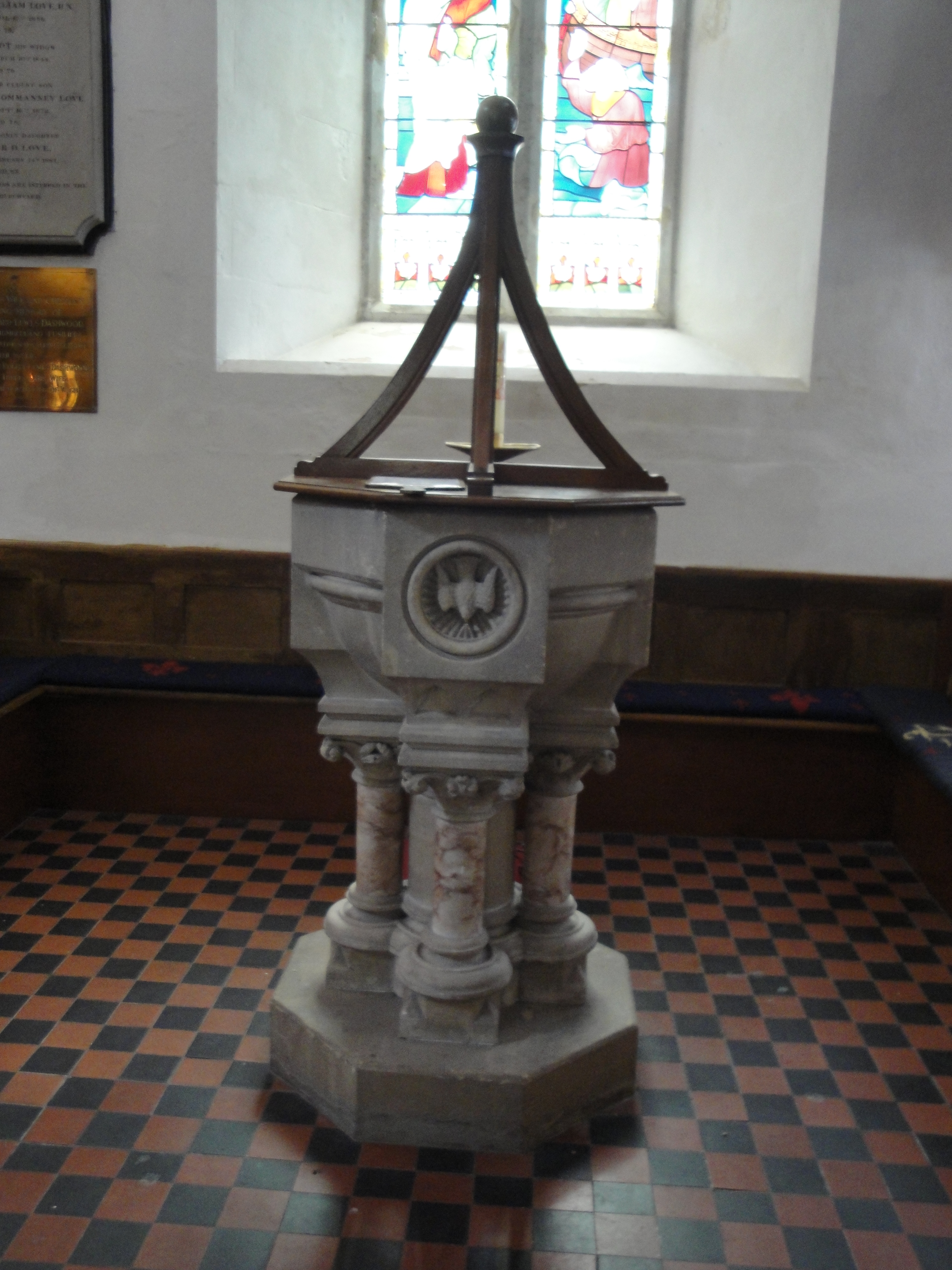
The font

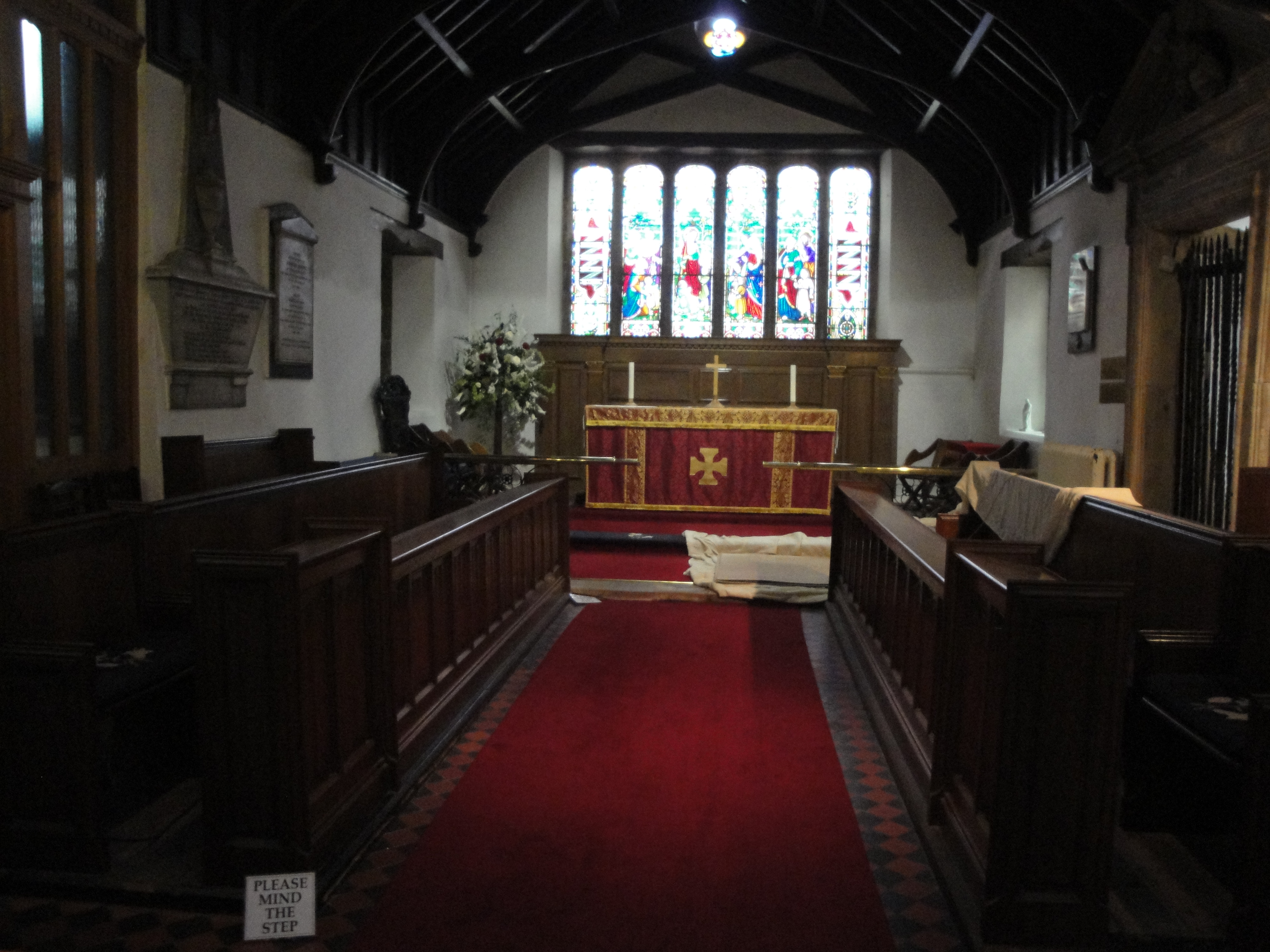
The altar

== Organ ==
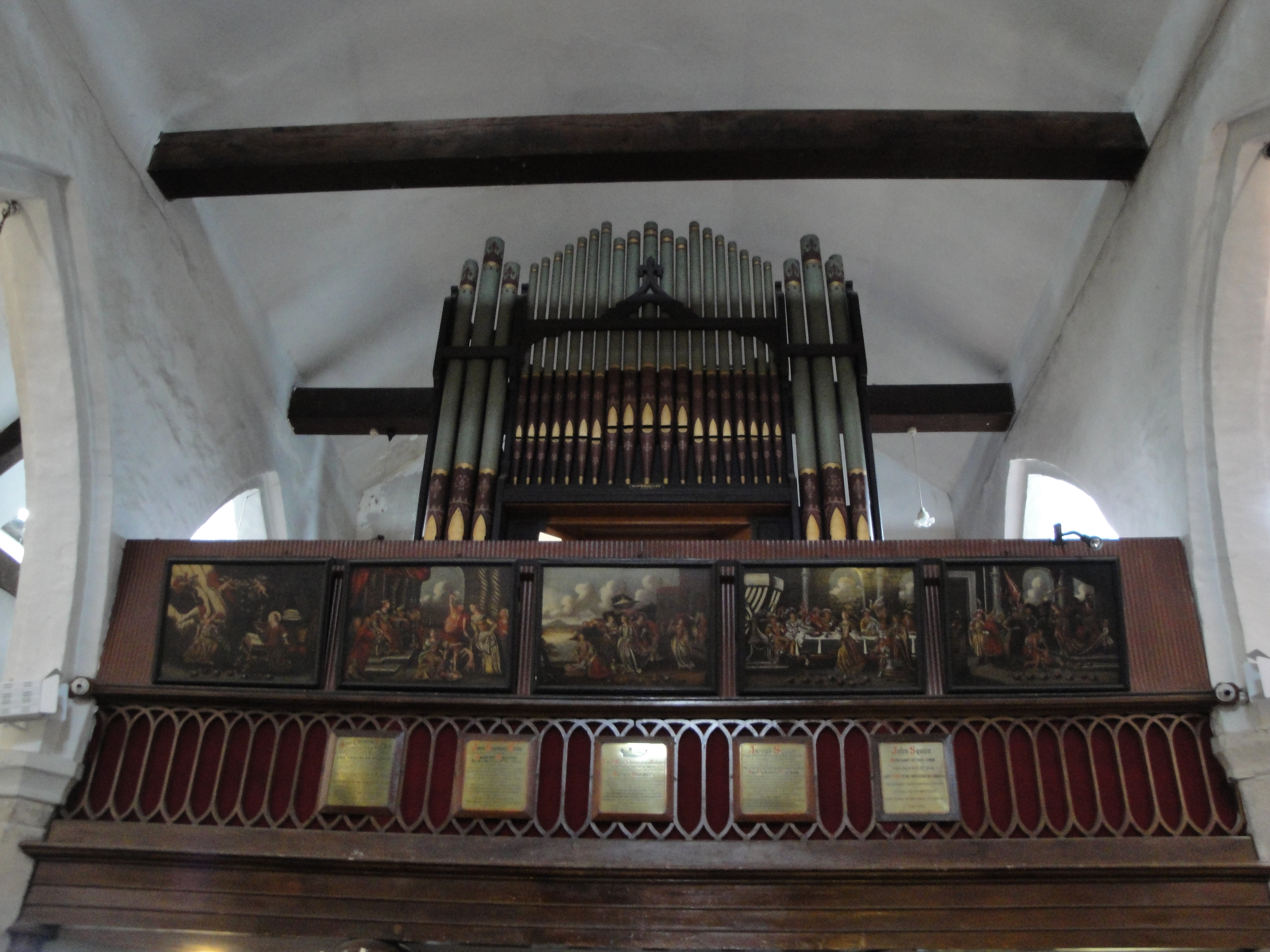
The organ

The organ was built by Henry Speechly & Son. A specification of the organ can be found on the National Pipe Organ Register.
