= Westcourt Manor =

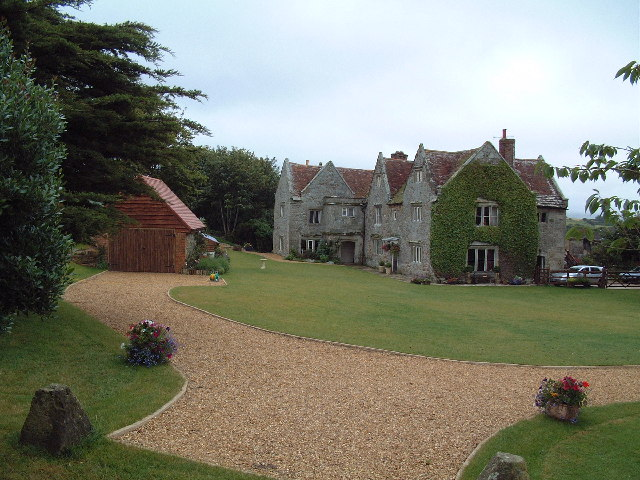

- Location within Isle of Wight
- 50°38′33.72″N 1°21′45″W
- OS grid reference: SZ4517682752

Listed Building – Grade II*
- Designated: 21 July 1951

Westcourt Manor (alternates: West Court Manor, or South Shorwell) is one of three manor houses, along with Woolverton and Northcourt, that is located in Shorwell, on the Isle of Wight, England. According to the Domesday Book, it was part of the possessions of Gozehne Fitz Azor, and had been held in the time of the Edward the Confessor by Ulnod in abeyance. At the time of the countess Isabella's record, we find that Sir John Lisle had this manor, with many others, which he held of her in capite, or by knight's service. It was possessed by Colonel Hill. An Elizabethan manor, it is connected to a farm of 200 acres.

== Early history ==
South Shorwell, or West Court, is thus described in Domesday Book:—"Isd. Goz. ten. Sorewelle. Uluod. tenuit in paragio: Tc. p. ii hid. et uno v. modo p. dim.hida. Tra. e. ii car. et. dim. In dno. e. una car. et ii vill. et vi bord. cu. una car. et dim. ibi iii servi et molin. de xl den. et xiiii ac. pti. T.RE. et post, valt c sol. modo iiii lib." (Gozelin, son of Azor, holds Shorwell. Ulnod holds it in abeyance. Then, it was assessed at two hides and one virgate; now only at half a hide. In the demesne there is one carucate, with two villeins, and 6 borderers, with two carucates aud a half. There are 3 slaves, and a mill at 40 denarii, and 14 acres of meadow land. King Edward held it, and afterwards it was valued at 100 shillings: now only at 4 pounds.) It remained in the De Insula or Lisle family, who once possessed such wide domains, for several centuries, and afterwards passed—like the parishes of Bonchurch and Shanklin —through the families of Dennis, Broad, and Alcorn, into that of Popham. The old manor-house is a very picturesque object from the road, being richly adorned with ivy up to its gabled roof.
