= Shorwell =

Village on the Isle of Wight, England

Coordinates: 50.64453°N 1.35499°W

- Village
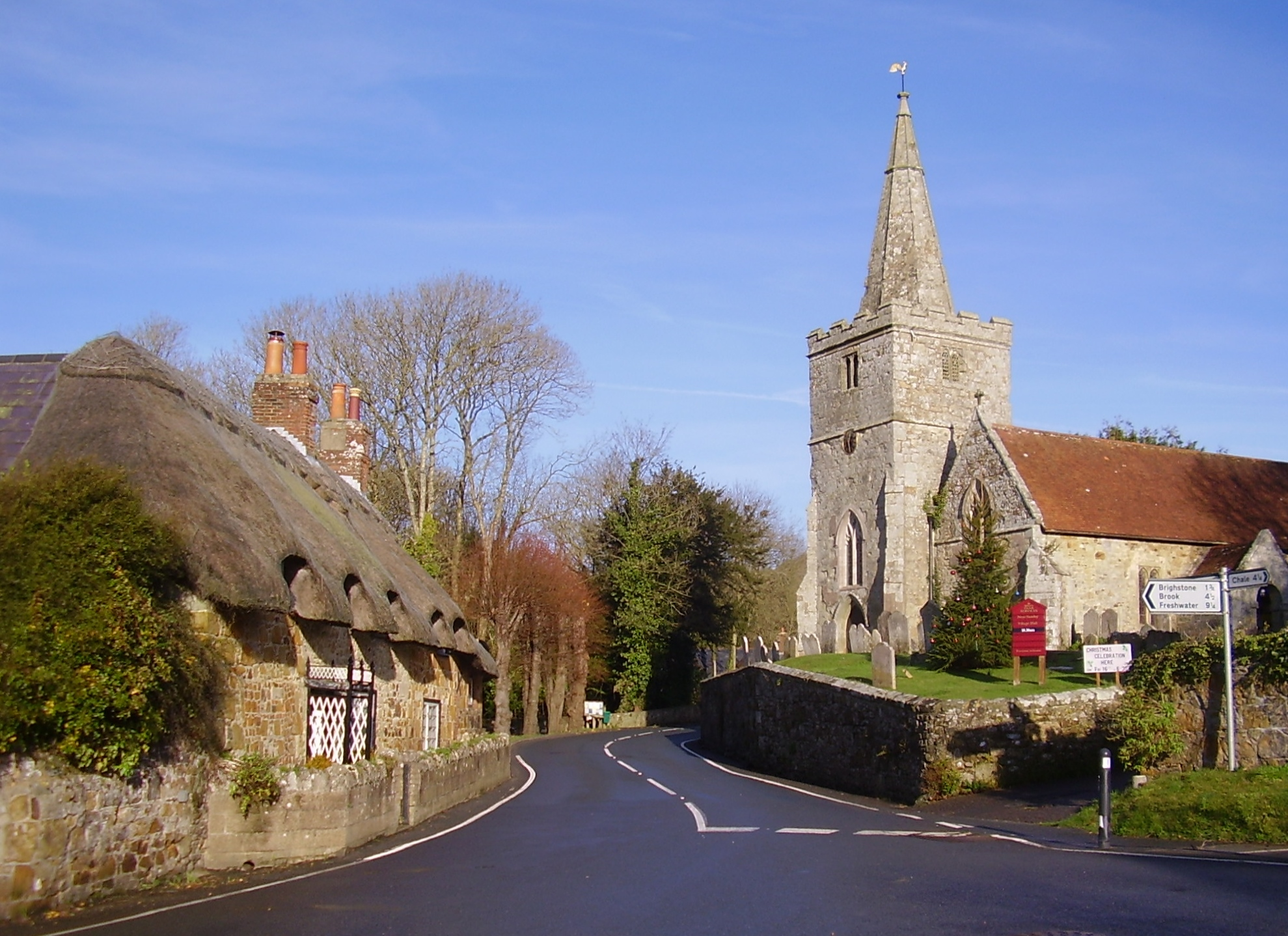
- Shorwell village

- Location within the Isle of Wight
- Population: 690 (2021 census)
- OS grid reference: SZ457829
- Civil parish: Shorwell
- Unitary authority: Isle of Wight
- Ceremonial county: Isle of Wight
- Region: South East
- Country: England
- Sovereign state: United Kingdom
- Post town: NEWPORT
- Postcode district: PO30
- Dialling code: 01983
- Police: Hampshire and Isle of Wight
- Fire: Hampshire and Isle of Wight
- Ambulance: Isle of Wight
- UK Parliament: Isle of Wight West

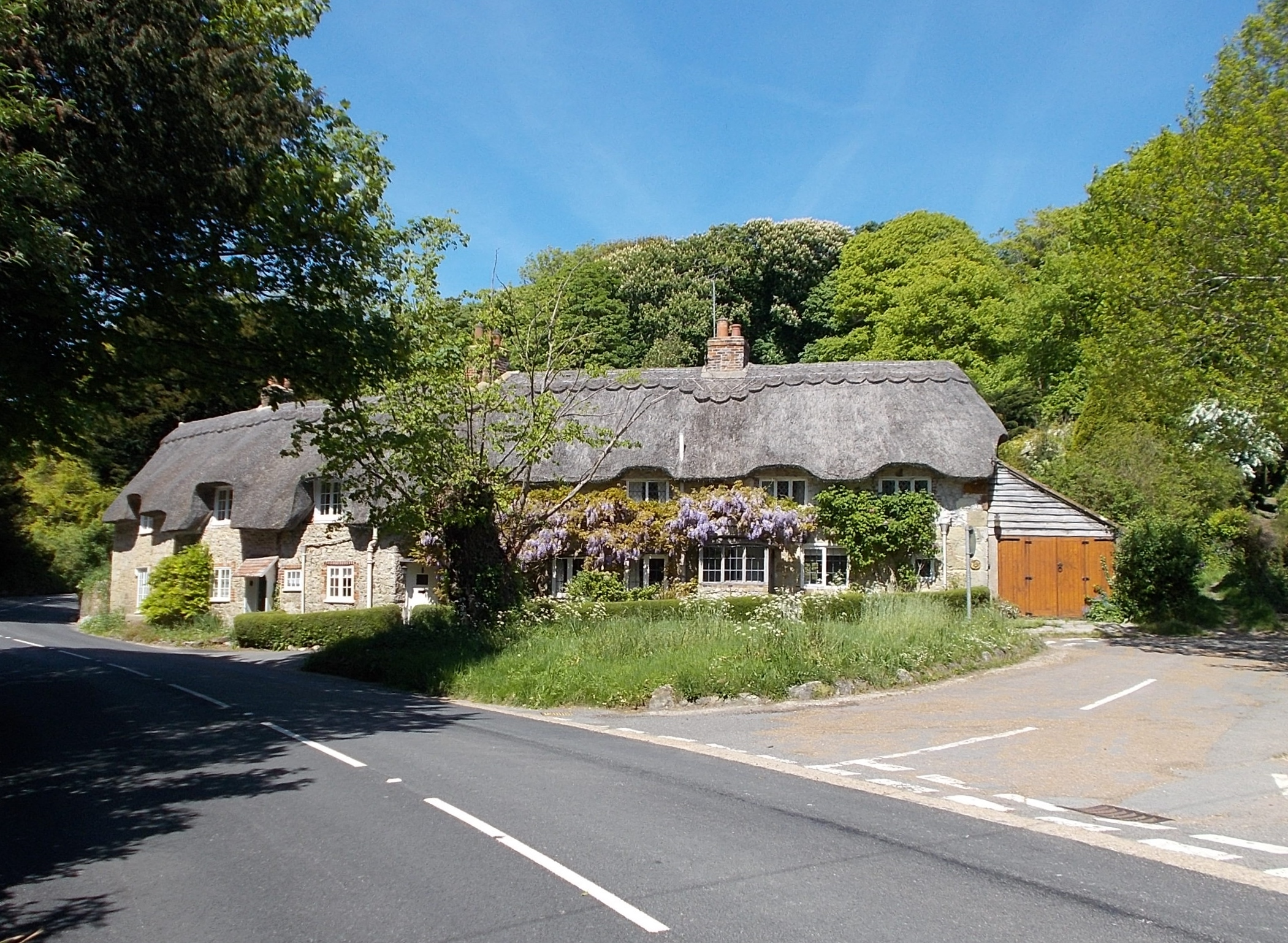
Thatched cottages in Shorwell

Shorwell (pronounced Shorrel by most locals and Islanders) is a village and civil parish on the Isle of Wight, United Kingdom. It is 4 1/2 miles (7.2 km) from Newport in the southwest of the island. Shorwell was one of Queen Victoria's favourite places to visit on the Isle of Wight.

The population of the parish was recorded as 690 in the 2021 census.

== History ==
The parish of Shorwell contains three manors: North Shorwell (or Northcourt), South Shorwell (or Westcourt), and Wolverton. The Shorwell helmet, a sixth-century Anglo-Saxon helmet, was found in the parish. Northcourt was built in 1615 by the Deputy Governor of the Island, Sir John Leigh, and is the islands's largest manor house. In the 13th century North Shorwell was gifted to the abbess of Lacock Abbey.

== Features ==
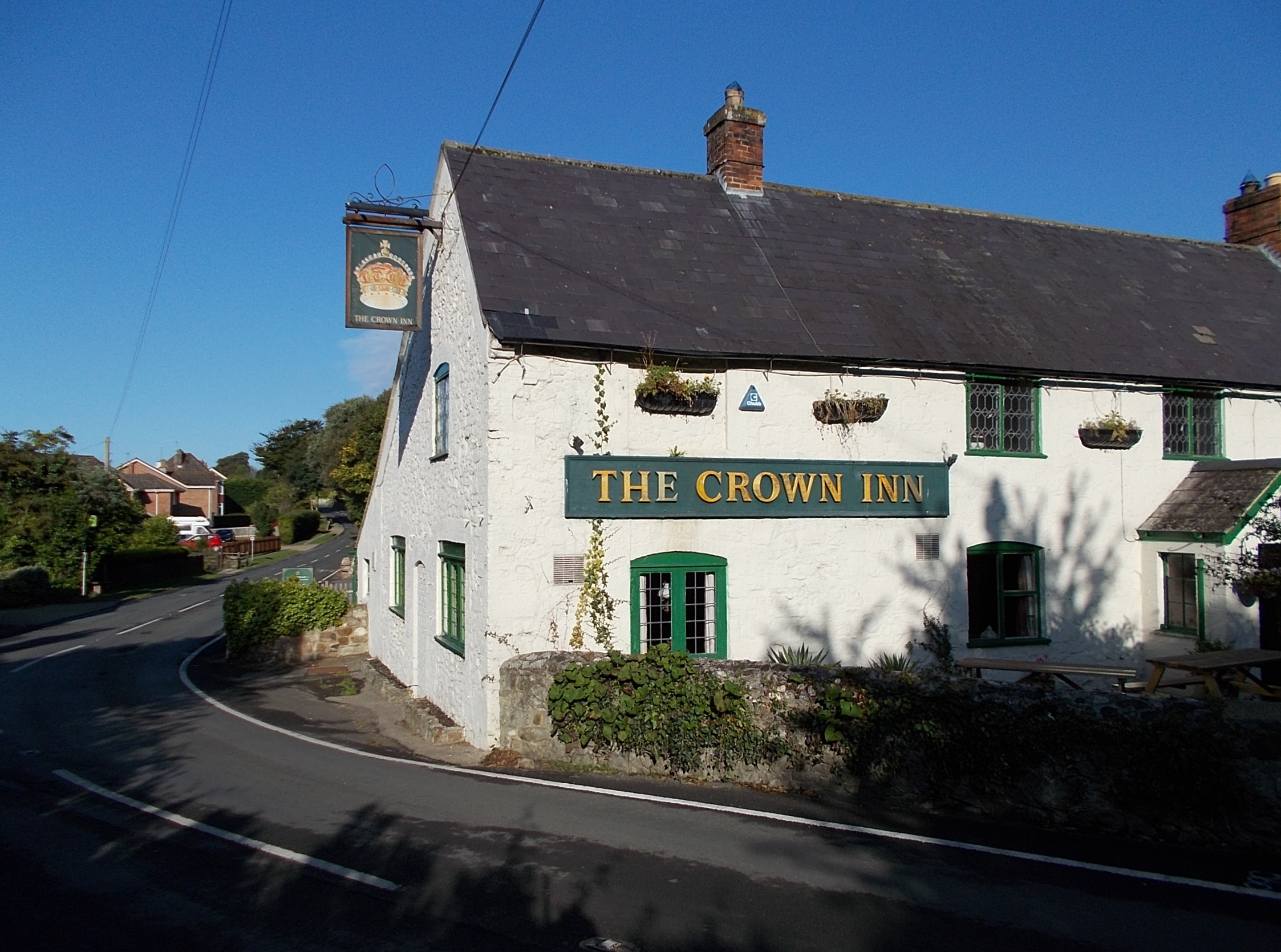
The Crown Inn

Northcourt Manor's grounds contain a spring, the Shor Well, which feeds a stream, one of the tributaries of the Buddle Brook. There is a pub called the Crown Inn, featuring a pond stocked with brown trout.

Shorwell's terrain is hilly, and backs onto the chalk downs leading to Chale Bay and Compton Bay; several public footpaths crisscross this region, linking the village up to walking routes nearer the sea. The twelfth-century St. Peter's Church is in the village.

The island's oldest netball club is based in Shorwell as well as Shorwell United, the Island's oldest Sunday League football club.

It is linked to other parts of the Island by Southern Vectis bus route 12, serving Freshwater, Totland and Newport as well as intermediate villages.
