= Royal Victoria Arcade, Ryde =

Shopping arcade in Ryde, Isle of Wight

Royal Victoria Arcade
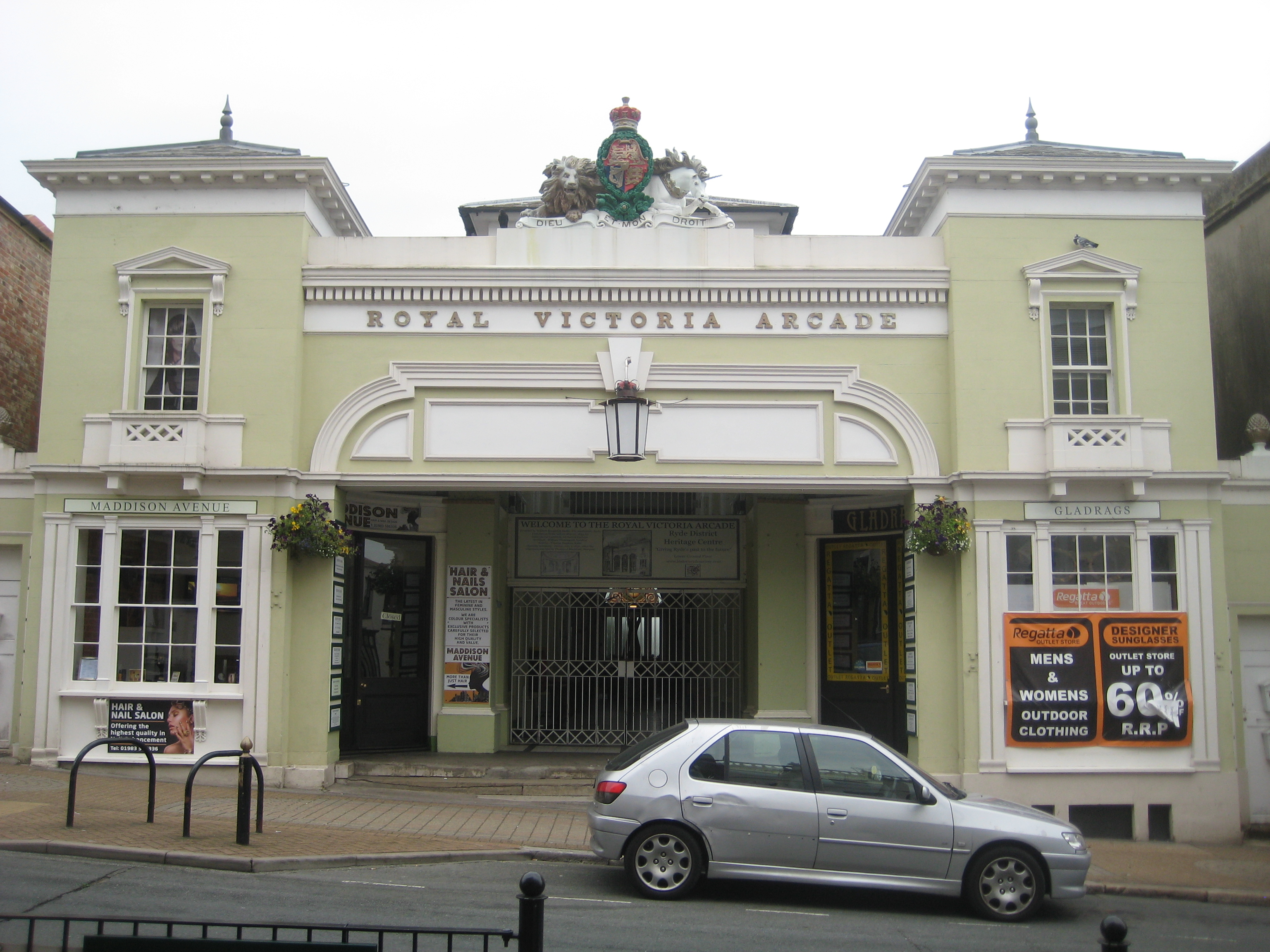
- Royal Victoria Arcade in 2013
- Interactive map of the Royal Victoria Arcade area

General information
- Status: Completed
- Type: Shopping arcade
- Classification: Grade II*
- Location: Ryde, Isle of Wight, England, Ryde, United Kingdom
- Coordinates: 50°43′53″N 01°09′42″W
- Construction started: 1835
- Renovated: 2001

The Royal Victoria Arcade is a shopping arcade in Ryde, Isle of Wight. Built between 1835 and 1836 and restored in 2001, the arcade currently has 14 shops and an underground museum. The arcade is a Grade II* listed building.

== History ==
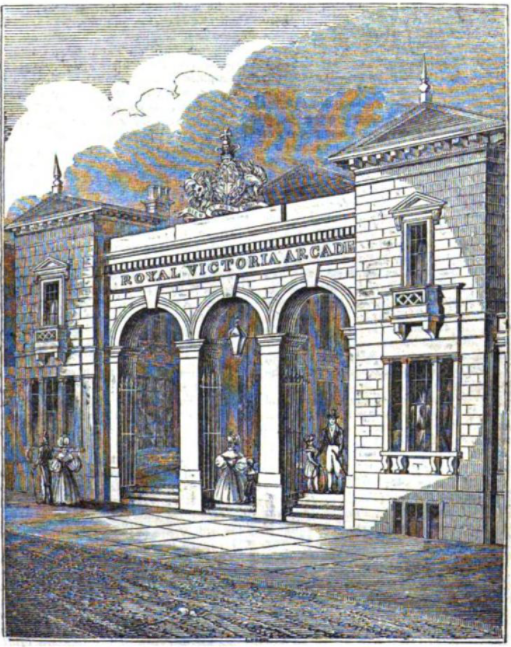
Royal Victoria Arcade in 1837.

The Royal Victoria Arcade was built between 1835 and 1836, and was restored in 2011. It was built for William Houghton Banks, who was an apothecary in Ryde. The cost of construction was £10,000. It was one of the first purpose-built shopping centres, and was named after Princess Victoria (later Queen Victoria), who had stayed at the nearby Norris Castle.

The arcade is in the neoclassical style, with three floors, and a 12 feet (3.7 m) avenue. It has a dome rotunda, which was painted in the 21st century, and contains Doric pilasters. Originally, the arcade had 14 shops, an underground market, and a space for art exhibitions. Ten of the shops were approximately 13 by 8 feet (4.0 m × 2.4 m), and four larger shops under the rotunda had a shopfront of around 30 feet (9.1 m). There was living space above the arcade. The underground market was in an ice house made of brick.

In 1856, the front entrance was modified, with the original three arches being replaced with a rectangular opening. In the 1860s, one shop was used by the Royal Photographic Society.

In 1950, Royal Victoria Arcade became a Grade II* listed building. The arcade became derelict in the 1970s, after an attempt to restore it. It was proposed for demolition in 1971, but this was voted against after a public inquiry the following year. After its restoration in 2001, the building once again has 14 shops and an underground local history museum in the former underground market. The original shopfronts were restored. In 2019, the arcade was put up for sale, and in the same year, it was proposed that the arcade was added to the Isle of Wight's Asset of Community Value list.
