= Haseley Manor (Isle of Wight) =

Manor house on the Isle of Wight, England

Coordinates: 50.667138°N 1.225951°W

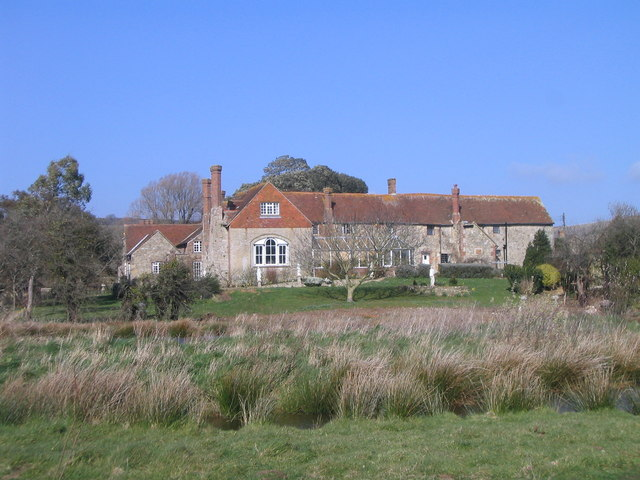
Haseley Manor.

Haseley Manor is a 14th-century, Grade II* listed property located in Arreton on the Isle of Wight.

The name Haseley is derived from the Saxon Haesel-leah meaning hazel wood, and the first record appears in 1086 in the Domesday Book, with Haseley being previously owned by King Harold, the unfortunate loser at the Battle of Hastings in 1066.

Part of the south wing contains Norman timber carved by the monks of Quarr Abbey in 1139 and Haseley claims to be the oldest house on the Island. Past owners have included four kings, Harold, William I, William II and Henry VIII, it was also the home of the judge, Sir Thomas Fleming, who tried Guy Fawkes.

In 1537 Thomas Wriothesley obtained a grant of it from the Crown, and sold it next year to John Mill of Southampton, whose son George made it his residence in the reign of Elizabeth. Here, Sir John Oglander notes, he 'kept a brave house and lived worshipfully.' From him the manor passed in the same way as Binstead to the Fleming family of North Stoneham Park, and as of 1912 belonged to Mr. John E. A. Willis-Fleming. According to Sir John Oglander the house, pleasantly situated in the low ground to the north of Horringford station, was practically rebuilt by the Mills. In 1781 the then owner, Col. Edward Fleming, remodelled the two south rooms and generally modernized the house.

By 1976 Haseley was derelict and overgrown with ivy. It has been restored over a 25-year period by Mr. Raymond Young and is now a Grade II* listed building and the private residence of Mr. & Mrs. Anthony Roberts
