= Thorley Manor =

Manor in Isle of Wight, England

Coordinates: 50.7004°N 1.4807°W

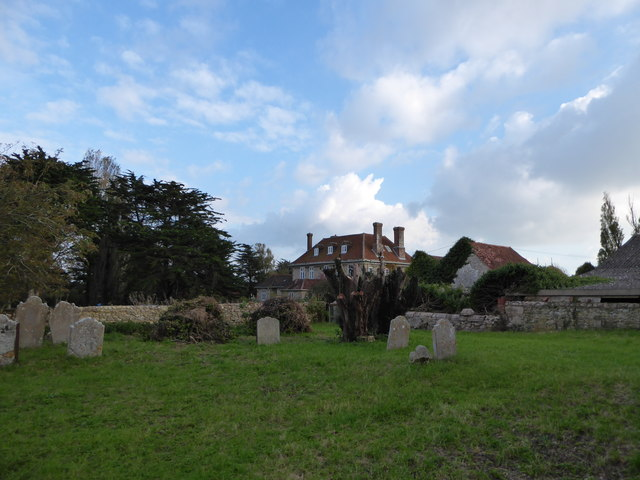
Looking across to Thorley Manor from The Old Churchyard.

Thorley Manor is a manor house just outside Yarmouth, on the Isle of Wight, England. Built in 1712, it features a modillion cornice, hipped roof, as well as tall chimneys.

== Early history ==
Richard de Redvers obtained this manor from Henry I, and it remained an appanage of the Lordship of the Isle, until Isabella de Fortibus sold it to the Crown. After being in the family of the Montacutes, it was granted to Edward of York, by Henry IV; to George, Duke of Clarence, by his brother; was resumed by the Crown on his attainder; and finally granted in the reign of Elizabeth to David Urry, Esq., reserving to the Crown a rental of £30 17s. 5d. per annum. It afterwards passed by marriage into the Lucy family, and thence by purchase into that of Holmes.

Formerly, a considerable part of this manor was a warren, and a grant of "one fifth of the conies in the manor of Thorley" was made by Isabella de Fortibus. The name of one of the Warreners has descended to posterity—Walter White, who held the office in the time of Edward III.
