= God's Providence House, Newport =

Building in Newport, Isle of Wight, England

Coordinates: 50.6996°N 1.2934°W

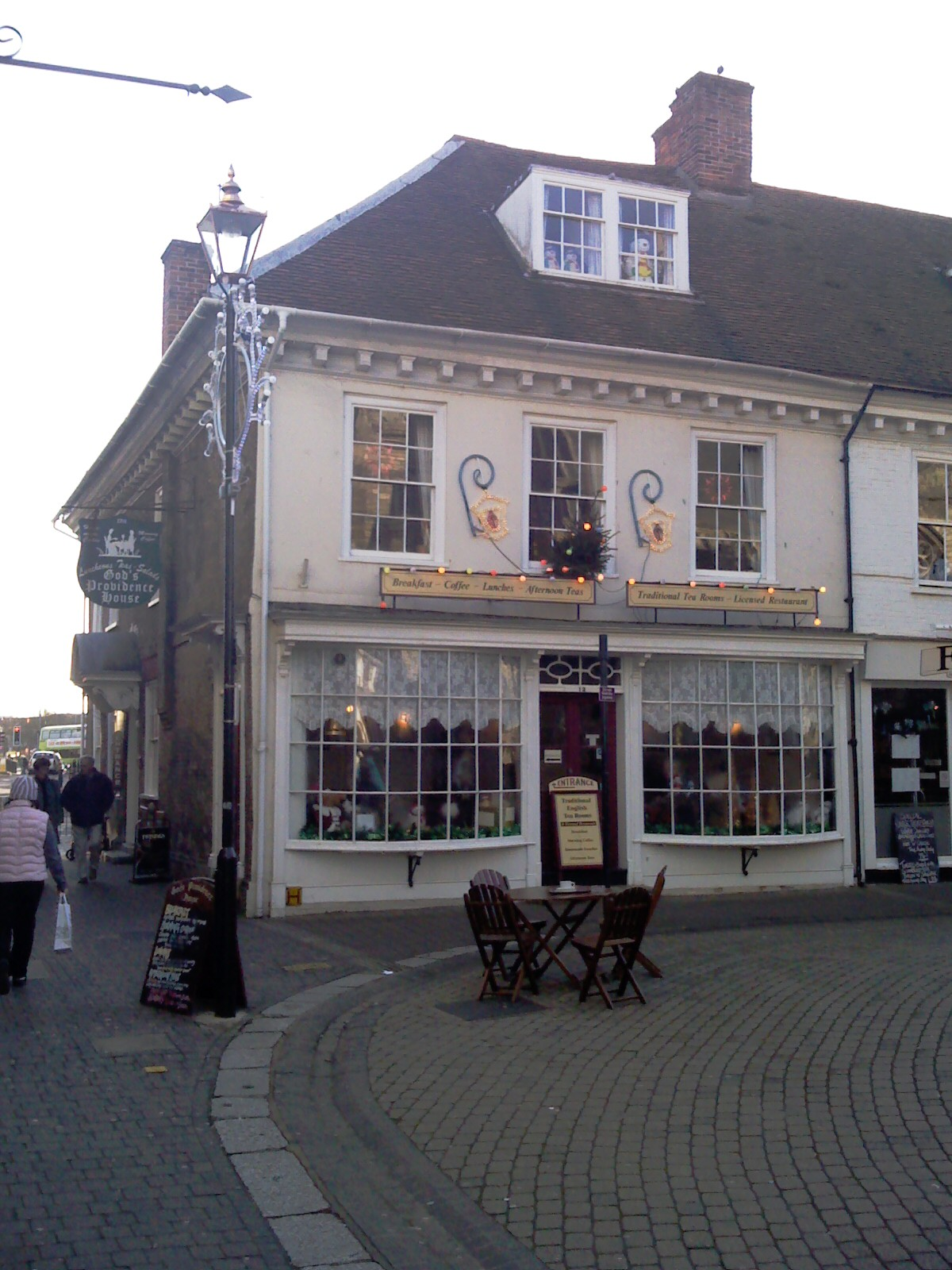
God's Providence House

God's Providence House is a building in St Thomas' Square, Newport, Isle of Wight, England. It was constructed in red brick with a tiled roof in the late 17th century. The front facing St Thomas' Square is rendered and contains an 18th-century double bow window. Over the main door is a panel bearing the inscription "WIE "God's Providence is my inheritance", 1701". The structure is recorded in the National Heritage List for England as a designated Grade II* listed building. During the 16th century the house was reputed to be the only house in the town in which there were no deaths from the plague. The building was damaged by fire in 1701, and was partly rebuilt. It is one of the oldest extant buildings in the town. As of 2012 the building is being used as a restaurant.
