= Wolverton Manor =

Manor house in Shorwell, Isle of Wight, England

Coordinates: 50.6399°N 1.3609°W

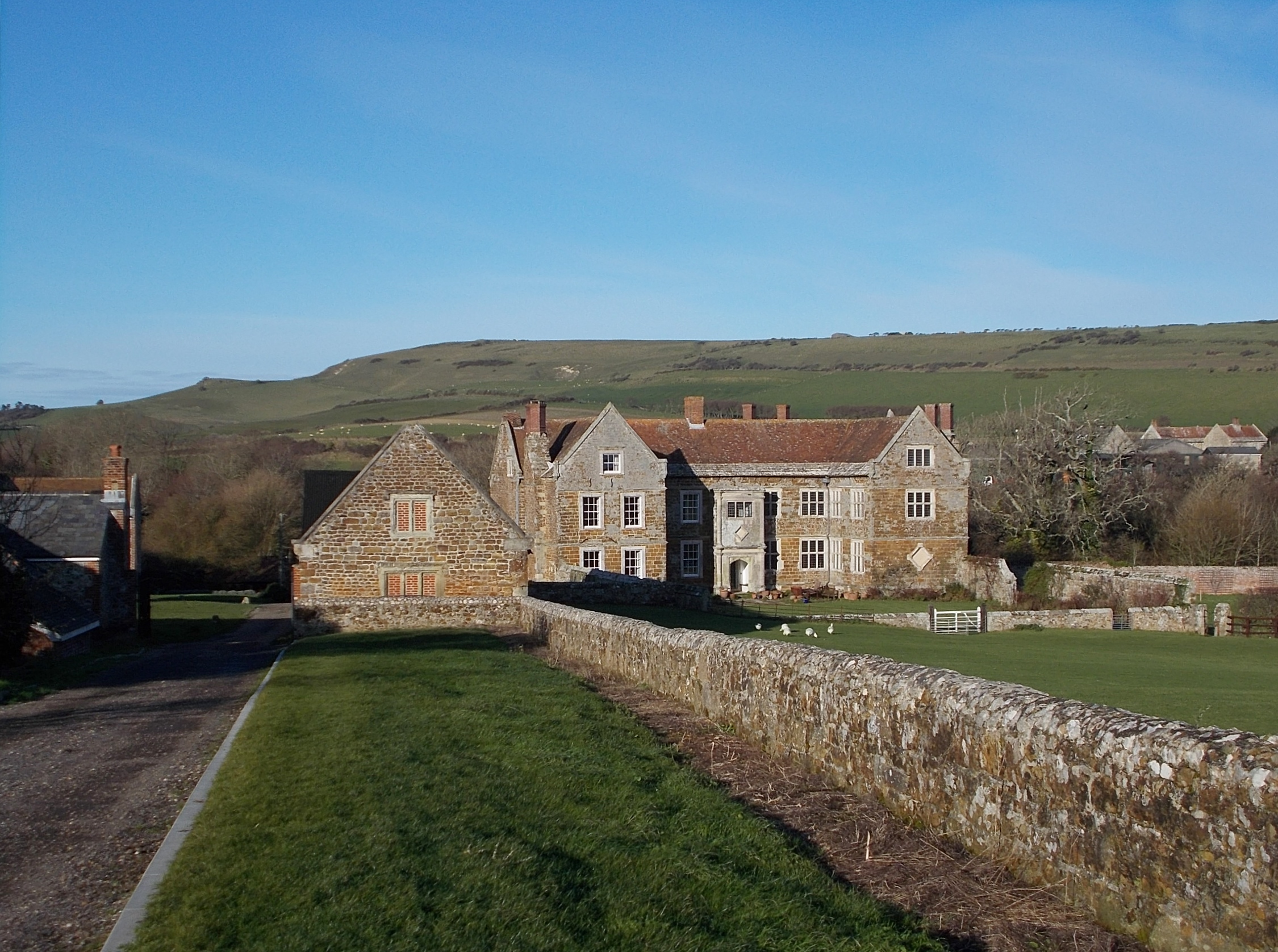
Wolverton Manor

Wolverton Manor (also Ulwartone, 11th century; Wolveton, 13th century) is a manor house in Shorwell, on the Isle of Wight, England. The original house was started by John Dingley (d. 1596), Deputy Governor of the Isle of Wight. The Jacobean style home, built by Sir John Hammond after the death of Sir John Dingley, is the second house built on the site. There is a two-storey porch which features a flat roof and hollow angle columns.

== History ==
Wolverton was held before the Conquest by Eddeva of Earl Godwine, and in 1086 belonged to the king. Robert Glamorgan held it in demesne of Carisbrooke Castle at the end of the 13th century. The Glamorgans, who were also lords of Brook, held Wolverton until the death of Nicholas Glamorgan in 1362–3. Nicholas left sisters and co-heirs, one of whom, Nichola, married Thomas Haket. Eleanor, a second co-heir of Nicholas, married Peter de Veer, and her son John was in 1383 engaged in a suit against John Mortaine and Alice his wife as to the ownership of an eighth of the manor of Wolverton.

Peter de Veer seems to have enfeoffed Nichola Glamorgan of the manor, and as John and Alice called to warranty her son Walter Haket it may be assumed that she had transferred her interest to them. The suit was postponed on account of Walter's minority, and John Mortaine seems to have retained possession at least until 1397. Another part of the manor passed with Brook to John Roucle or Rookley, and in 1431 the estate was held jointly by him and John Haket, to whom Mortaine's holding had reverted before 1428. John Haket was said to be in sole possession of the manor in 1438, and it passed with a moiety of Brook to his daughter Joan wife of John Gilbert. Her grandson George Gilbert conveyed the manor in 1565 to Anthony Dillington, who sold it in the same year to John son of Richard Worsley. The manor then followed the descent of Appuldurcombe until 1848, when it was sold to Sir Graham Eden Hamond, whose grandson Sir Graham Eden William Graeme Hamond-Graeme held it by 1912.

== Present day ==
Still a private home, Wolverton Manor also hosts a Garden Fair, a Blues and Jazz Festival and many classical concerts.
