= Gatcombe (disambiguation) =

Gatcombe is a village on the Isle of Wight, England.

Gatcombe may also refer to:

== Australia ==
- Gatcombe, Queensland, a town on Facing Island in the Gladstone Harbour in the Gladstone Region

== United Kingdom ==
- Gatcombe, Gloucestershire a hamlet in Awre, Gloucestershire, England
- Gatcombe, Somerset, England, a house in Somerset known for its Roman ruins
- Chillerton and Gatcombe, a civil parish on the Isle of Wight, formerly called just "Gatcombe"
- Gatcombe Park a house in Gloucestershire, best known as the home of Princess Anne, England
