= Clement Smith (priest) =

English priest

The Reverend Clement Smith, MVO, MA (died 22 May 1921) was a Canon of Windsor from 1902 to 1921.

== Early life and education ==
Third son of Henry Smith, of London, armiger, Smith was educated at St Paul's School, London, then went up to Christ Church, Oxford, where he graduated BA in 1868. He was ordained deacon in 1869 and priest in 1871, by the Bishop of Winchester (Samuel Wilberforce).

== Career ==
His first position was as second master of the Royal Grammar School, Guildford in 1869, where he served until 1874, when he accepted the curacy of Michelmersh, Hampshire. In 1878 he became vicar of Awbridge, in 1887 vicar of Hedge End (both in Hampshire), and in 1890 he moved to the Isle of Wight to become vicar of Newport Minster. Two years later he became vicar of the Church of St. Nicholas in Castro, Carisbrooke, and during these early years on the Isle of Wight he was frequently invited to preach for Queen Victoria at Whippingham and at the private chapel at Osborne House. In 1894 he was appointed by the Lord Chancellor to the rectory of St. Mildred's Church, Whippingham, in which diocese Osborne House was situated. As rector of the local parish, he often met the Queen and members of the royal family, and he was summoned during the Queen's illness before her death in January 1901. He was subsequently decorated with the Royal Victorian Order (MVO) by her successor, King Edward VII.

Smith was appointed honorary chaplain to Queen Victoria in 1893, and served as a chaplain in ordinary to the Queen from 1896 until her death in 1901. Queen Victoria mentioned him in the last diary entry she ever wrote, saying that she attended a short service by him, and that it was a "great comfort" to her. King Edward appointed him chaplain in ordinary to the King in 1901, and he served as such until the first year of the reign of King George V in 1910.

He was appointed to the fifth stall in St George's Chapel, Windsor Castle in March 1902, and installed as canon on 19 April 1902. He held this position until he died in 1921.

== Personal life ==
His daughter, Dorothy (d. 1948), married (Arthur) Paul Boissier, headmaster of Harrow School; their daughter was June Gordon, Marchioness of Aberdeen and Temair.
