= Lucy Lightfoot =

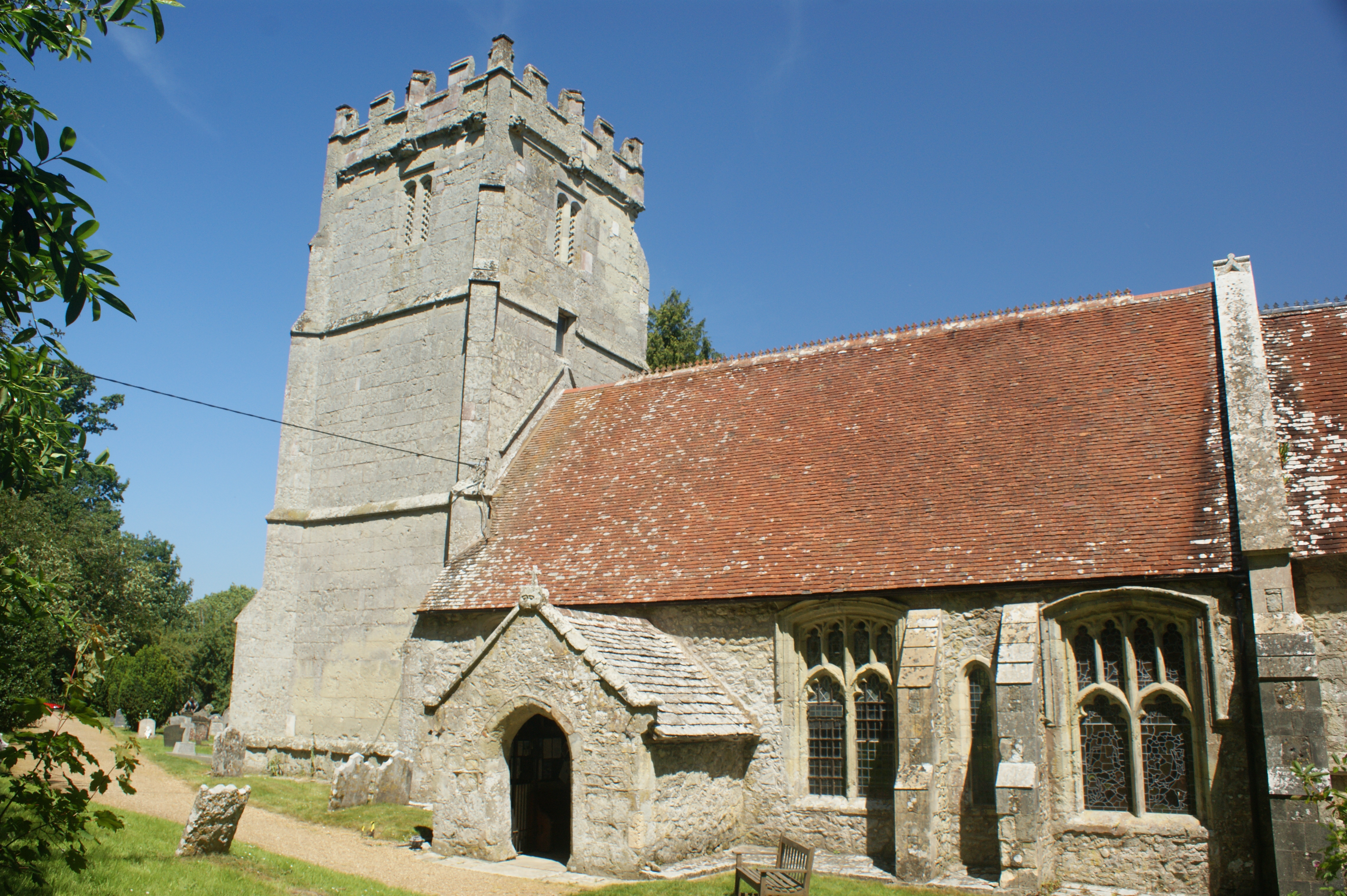
St Olave's Church, Gatcombe, closely associated with the legend

Lucy Lightfoot is the name of a fictional girl who supposedly disappeared mysteriously from the Isle of Wight in 1831. The story was fabricated by James Evans, the vicar of St Olave's Church, Gatcombe, in the early 1960s, as he himself later admitted.

== Legend ==
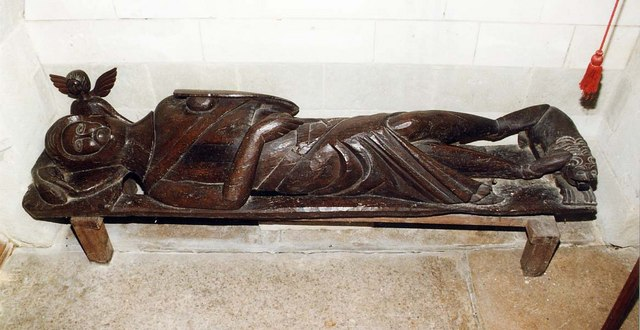
The wooden effigy in St Olave's Church

Lucy was born at a farm near Bowcombe. She was last seen around 10:30am on 13 June 1831. There was a near total eclipse of the sun that day, lasting about half an hour. A violent thunder storm also struck the island, causing flooding and crop damage. After the storm had abated, her horse was found tied to the gate at St Olave's Church in Gatcombe. Lucy was nowhere to be found. Her parents offered a large reward for her return, but moved away after two years searching turned up nothing.

Also of note is the detail that a steel misericord attached to a wooden effigy identified as "Edward Estur" was found shattered after her disappearance. A valuable chrysoberyl set in lodestone on the hilt was found to be missing.

== Explanations ==
The most prominent explanations involved a possible time slip. Supposedly research by the Rev Samuel Trelawney in 1865 unearthed a manuscript by Philippe de Mézières, chancellor of Peter I, listing the names of the English knights recruited by Peter I of Cyprus in 1363. One Sir Edward Estur was listed as being accompanied by a girl with the same name as Lucy, from Carisbrooke Castle.

In the 1960s, the Vicar of St Olave's, James Evans, admitted to having fabricated the entire story.

== In media ==
=== Fiction ===
- The book The Grass Beyond the Door (1999) by Cicely Veighey is based on the legend.
- For The Love of Lucy by Andrew J. Müller, published in In Front Magazine in March 1999.
- A Tapestry of Time: Or Effigy of Love (2001) by Cecily Gould is also based on the legend.

=== Music ===
A song by Spherical Objects titled "Lucy" was inspired by the legend. It appeared in the 1979 album Elliptical Optimism.

== Sources ==
- Brookesmith, Peter (1986). "When the sun went dark". The Unexplained. Vol. 3. London: Marshall Cavendish. pp. 284–286. ISBN 0-86307-100-7. Archived from the original on 28 September 2008.
- Frost, Richard (1980). "The Enigma of the Gatcombe Effigy". Isle of Wight Mysteries. Shanklin: W. J. Nigh & Sons. pp. 26–33.
- Searle, Adrian (1998). Isle of Wight Folklore. Wimborne: Dovecote. pp. 51–53. ISBN 1874336636.
