= Church of St John the Baptist, Newport =

Church on the Isle of Wight, England

Coordinates: 50°41′45″N 01°17′43″W

Church of St. John the Baptist, Newport
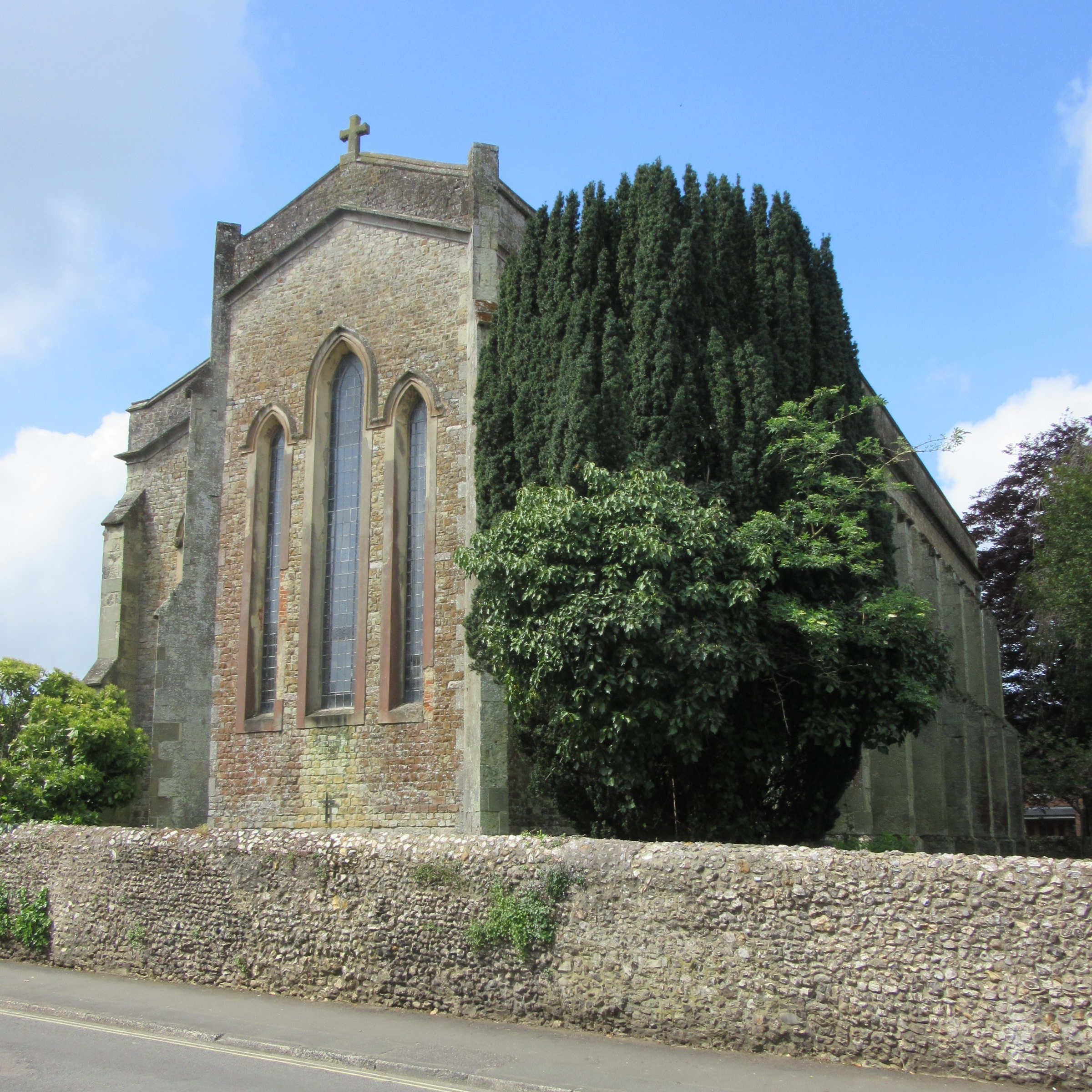
- The church from St John's Road
- Church of St. John the Baptist, Newport
- Denomination: Church of England
- Churchmanship: Open Evangelical

History
- Dedication: St. John the Baptist

Administration
- Province: Canterbury
- Diocese: Portsmouth
- Parish: Newport, Isle of Wight

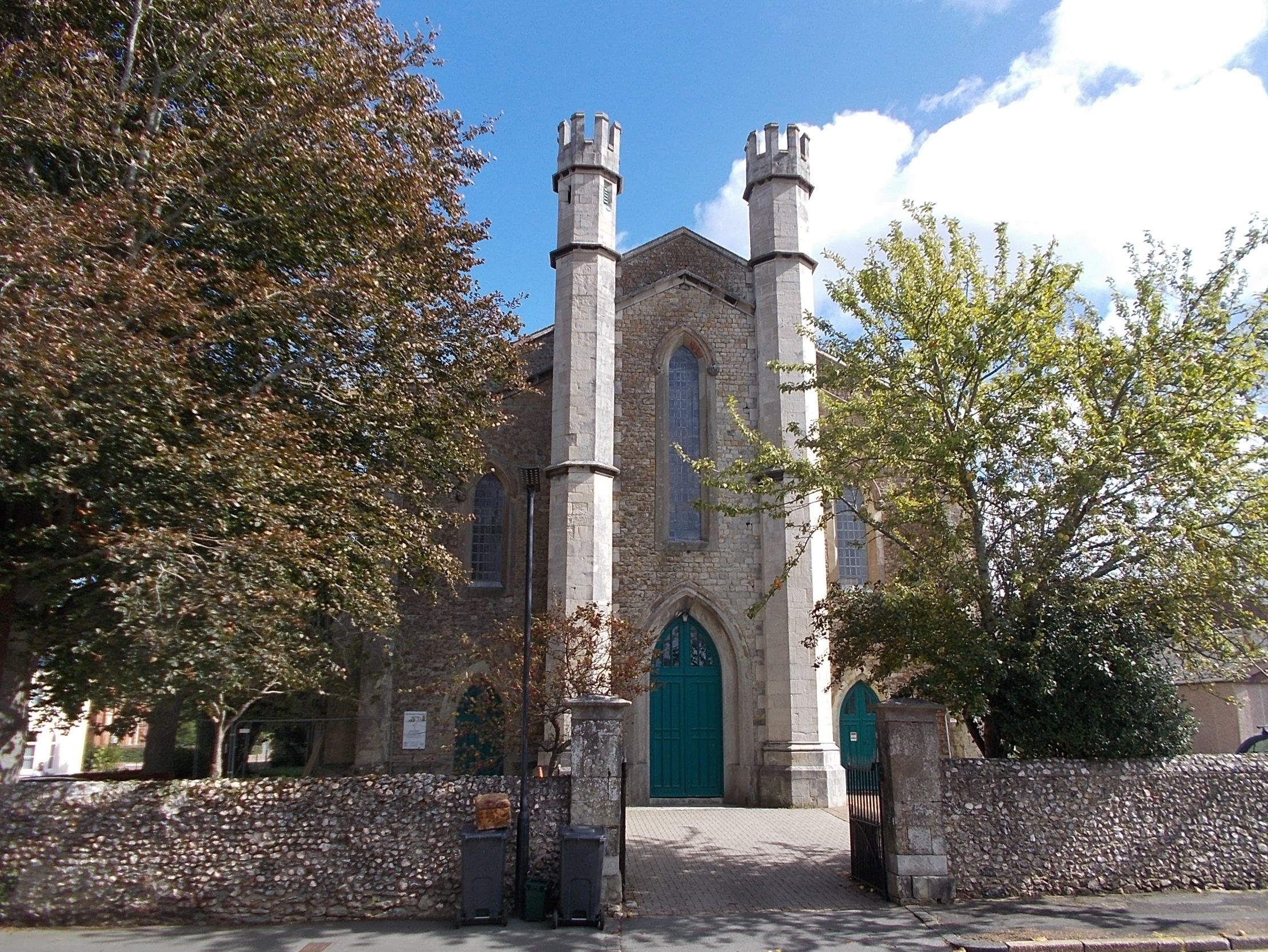
West face of the church

The Church of St. John the Baptist, Newport is a parish church in the Church of England located in Newport, Isle of Wight. It is a Grade II listed building, the only surviving building by the British architect Robert Gunter Wetten (1804–1868).

== History ==
Construction started in 1835. The building, at the junction of St. John's Road and Terrace Road, was complete by 1837. It cost £3,600 and had 830 seats.

It was consecrated on 4 April 1837 by Charles Sumner, Bishop of Winchester.

Originally it was a daughter church within the Parish of Carisbrooke, and known as St John's Church, Carisbrooke. It became a parish church in its own right in 1896, by order of the Privy Council. It is now part of a joint parish with Sts Thomas Minster, St Mary's, Carisbrooke and St Olave's, Gatcombe.

== Organ ==
An organ was provided when the church opened in 1837, which was later replaced by a pipe organ by Bryceson Brothers dating from 1890. A specification of the organ can be found on the National Pipe Organ Register.

=== List of organists ===
- J.H.Mew 1836 – after 1842
- A.Wells before 1882–1889
- Alexander S. L. Scadding 1890–1921 - 1921 - ????
- Dorothy M. Welby Prior 1921–1959 1949
- Horace Lower (acting) 1959
- Alfred Westley Faulkner 1959–1960
- Horace Lower (acting) 1960
- James Ludlow 1960–1962
- Horace Lower 1962–1980
- John Matthews (acting) 1980
- John Matthews 1980–present
