= Chillerton and Gatcombe =

Civil parish on Isle of Wight, England

Coordinates: 50.659°N 1.301°W

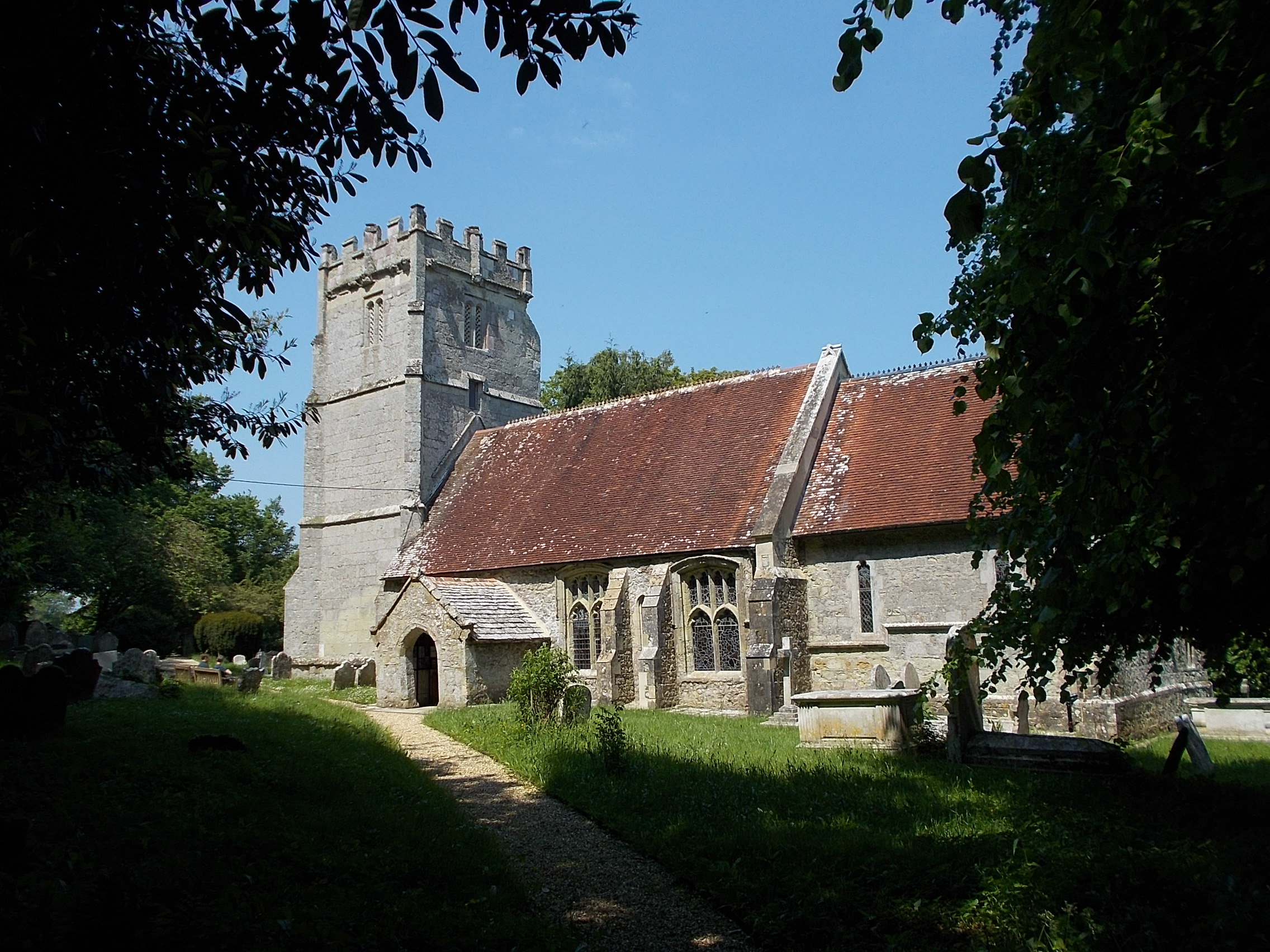
- St Olave's Church, Gatcombe

- Location within the Isle of Wight
- Population: 426 (2021 census)
- OS grid reference: SZ495846
- Civil parish: Chillerton and Gatcombe
- Unitary authority: Isle of Wight
- Ceremonial county: Isle of Wight
- Region: South East
- Country: England
- Sovereign state: United Kingdom
- Post town: NEWPORT
- Postcode district: PO30
- Dialling code: 01983
- Police: Hampshire and Isle of Wight
- Fire: Hampshire and Isle of Wight
- Ambulance: Isle of Wight
- UK Parliament: Isle of Wight West

Chillerton and Gatcombe is a civil parish on the Isle of Wight, England, including the two villages of Chillerton and Gatcombe. It was previously the parish of Gatcombe but was renamed in 2013 under a 2011 order of Isle of Wight Council.

It has a parish council, the lowest form of local government.

The population of the parish in the 2011 census was 422, which rose to 426 in the 2021 census. The area of the parish is 11.25 square kilometres (4.34 sq mi).

As of 2022 there are 19 listed buildings in the parish, of which St Olave's Church, Gatcombe is at grade I and Gatcombe House and Sheat Manor at grade II*.
