= St Mary's Church, Carisbrooke =

Church on the Isle of Wight, England

Coordinates: 50°41′31″N 01°18′49″W

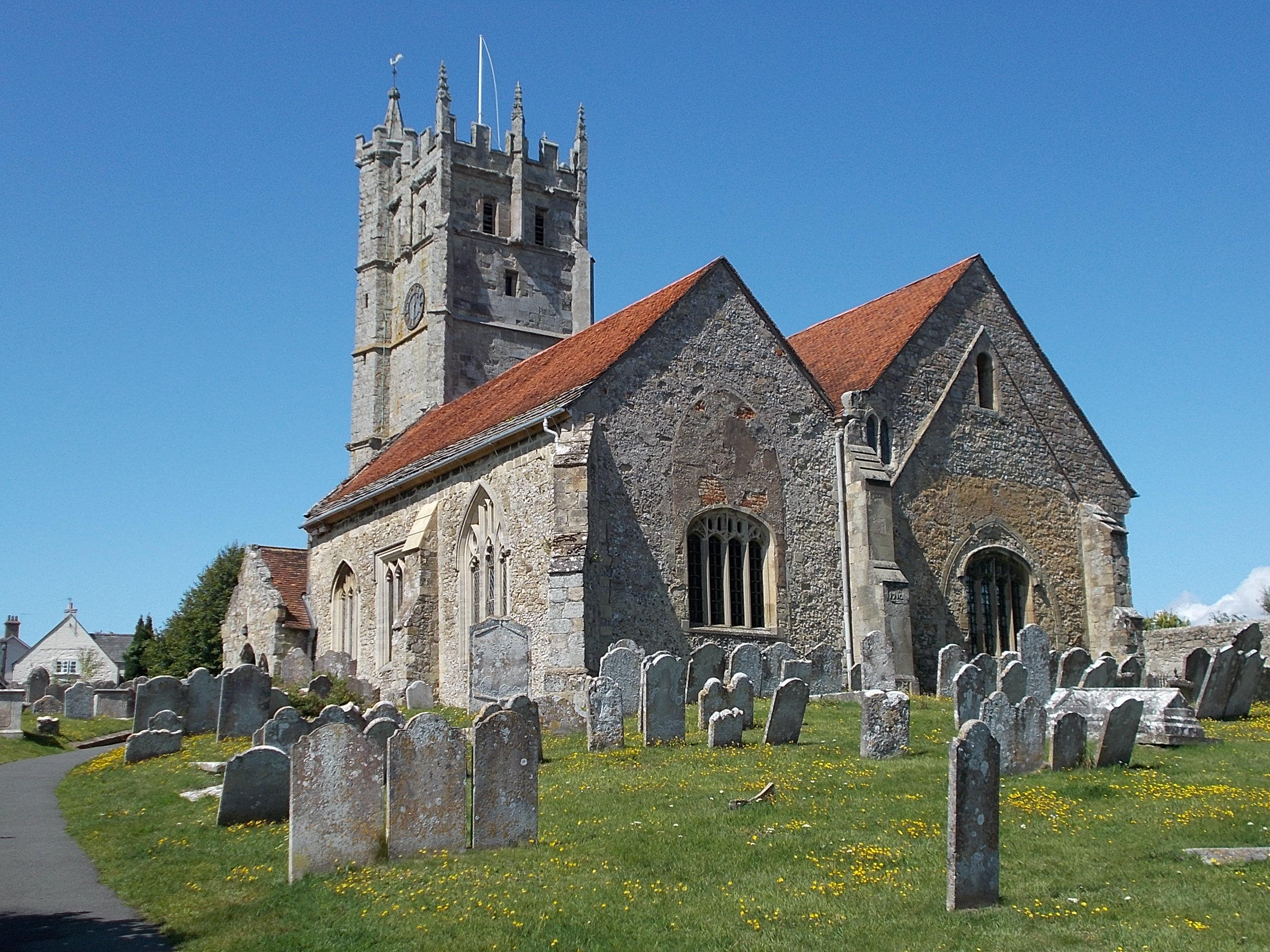
- St Mary's Church, Carisbrooke
- Denomination: Church of England
- Churchmanship: Broad Church

History
- Dedication: St Mary

Administration
- Province: Canterbury
- Diocese: Portsmouth
- Parish: Carisbrooke

St Mary's Church, Carisbrooke is a parish church in the Church of England located in Carisbrooke, Isle of Wight. A service is held every Sunday morning at 8:00 and 9:30.

== History ==
The church is medieval dating from the Norman period. The tower contains a ring of 10 bells. The back 8 bells were cast in 1921 by Gillet and Johnston, Croydon and were made a ring of 10 in 2002 by the Whitchapel Bell Foundry. The church is home to the funeral monument of Margaret Seymour, Lady Wadham, aunt to Jane Seymour, and second wife to Sir Nicholas I Wadham, Captain of the Isle of Wight from 1509 to 1520.

== Church status ==
The church was formerly grouped with the Church of St Nicholas in Castro, Carisbrooke, and is now additionally grouped with Sts Thomas Minster, Newport, St John's, Newport and St Olave's, Gatcombe.

== Incumbents ==
Alexander Ross, prolific Scottish writer and controversialist, was vicar of Carisbrooke from 1634 until his death in 1654.

== Burials ==
- Lady Wadham, 1520
- William Keeling, 1619 (discoverer of the Keeling Islands in the Indian Ocean)
- Sir William Stephens, 1697
- Sir Henry Daly

== Organ ==
The church has a two manual organ dating from 1908 by Bevington. A specification of the organ can be found on the Nation pipe organ register. The church also has a small practice organ and a piano.

=== List of organists ===
- John T. Read ca. 1912
