= Huffingford Manor =

Manor house on the Isle of Wight

Huffingford Manor (also Hovyngford) is a manor house on the Isle of Wight, situated in the parish of Arreton.

Beyond the mill there is practically no land now to correspond with the early holding, which doubtless included what is now known as Blackwater. The ford still exists by the side of the bridge, built in 1776, where the ancient road to Newport turns to the westward. If the Domesday entry Huncheford is taken as representing Huffingford, there was a mill there in early days, and a family seems in the 13th and 14th centuries to have taken its name from the holding. William of Huffingford held a quarter fee there towards the end of the 13th century under John de Lisle. A Walter de Huffingford was witness to a grant of land at Whitcombe in 1323. William le Martre held another quarter fee there under the manor of Gatcombe in 1293–4, to be succeeded by John le Martre in 1346 and in 1428 by Isabel Martre, who had apparently married — Hughes, as she is returned for aid three years later as Isabel Hughes. In 1500 John Clarke, a Lymington butcher, owned land in Huffingford, which is the last mention of the holding under that name. The mill has had various owners, being at one time used for lacemaking. As of 1912 it was owned by Mrs. George Mearman.
