= Chillerton Down transmitting station =

Radio transmission site on the Isle of Wight, England

Chillerton Down
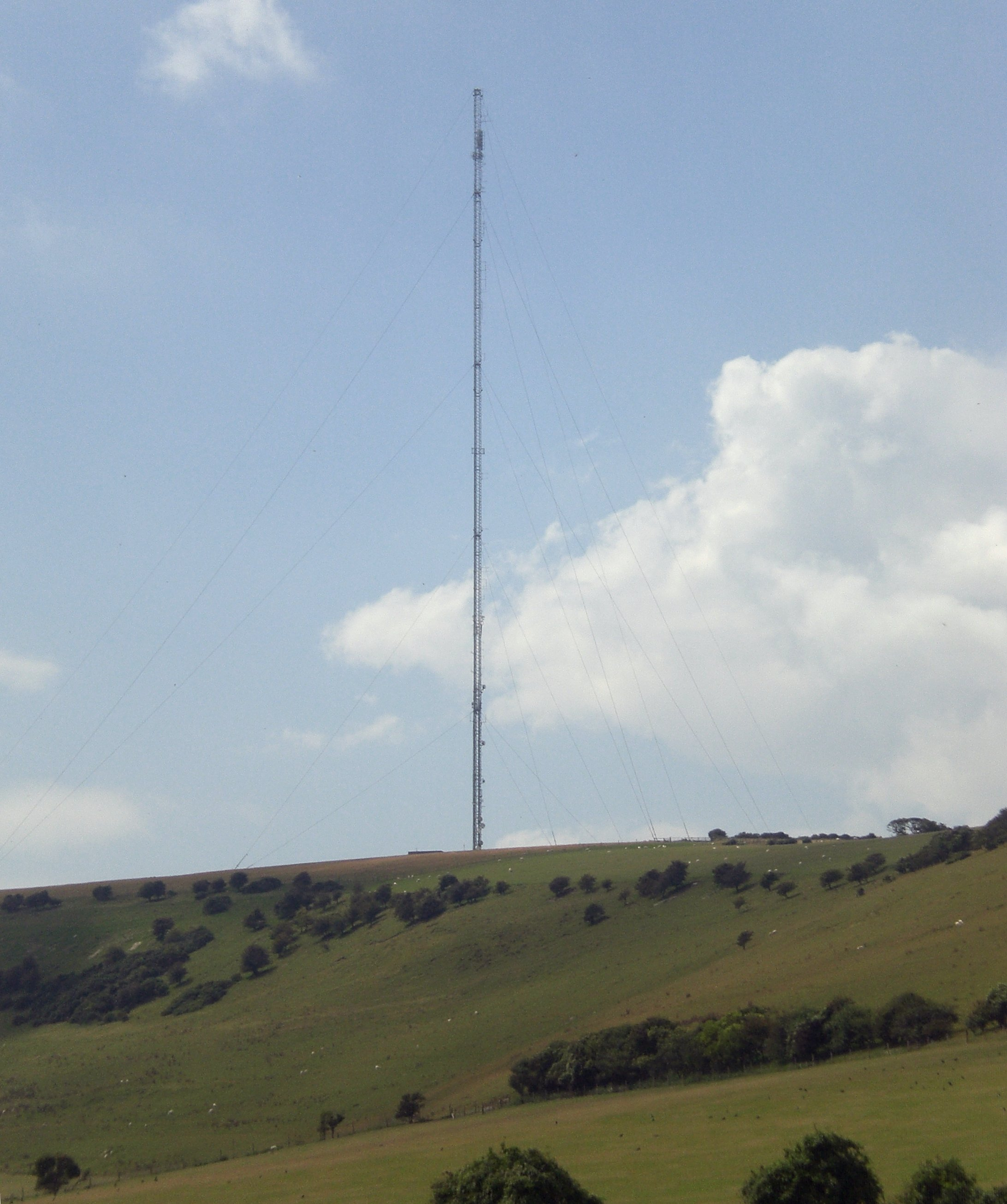
- The Chillerton Down transmitting station

- Location within Isle of Wight
- Mast height: 228.9 metres (751 ft)
- Coordinates: 50.649167°N 1.328889°W
- Grid reference: SZ475835
- Built: 30 August 1958
- ITV region: Southern Television (1958-1981); TVS (1982-1985)

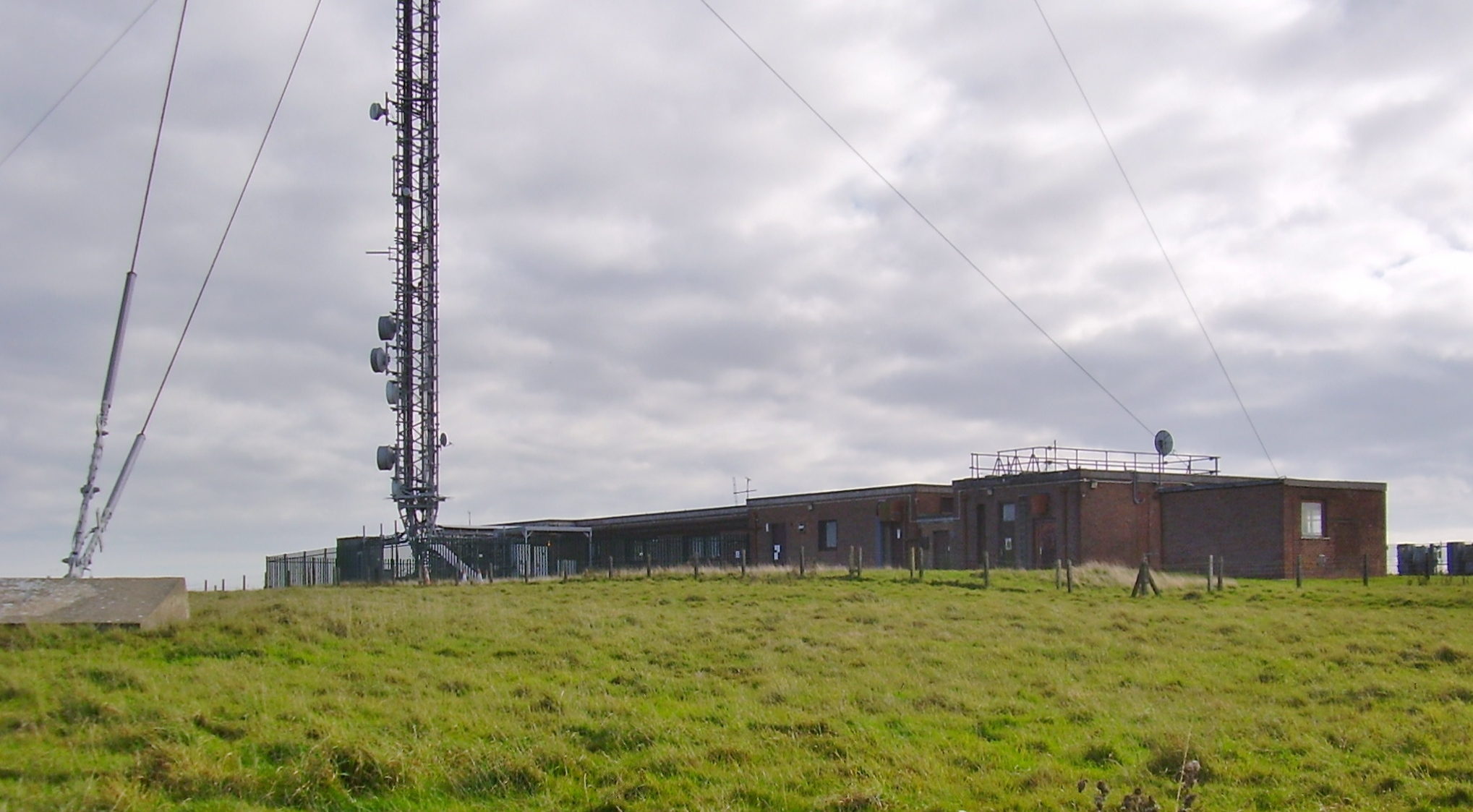

The Chillerton Down transmitting station is a broadcasting facility for FM and DAB radio at Chillerton Down, above the village of Chillerton on the Isle of Wight off the south coast of England (grid reference SZ475835). The transmitter was erected in 1958 and uses a 228.9-metre (751 ft) high guyed steel lattice mast of triangular cross section as an aerial.

== History ==
=== Construction ===
It was built by BICC.

=== Transmission ===
It was originally used to transmit Southern Television, and later TVS, until the end of VHF television transmissions in the UK at the beginning of 1985. It now transmits Greatest Hits Radio, Capital South, Nation Radio South Coast, Isle of Wight Radio, the local Arqiva (NOW S. Hampshire) DAB multiplex and the national Digital One DAB multiplex.

The site is owned and operated by Arqiva.

== Channels available by frequency ==
=== Analogue radio ===
Frequency	kW	Service
103.2 MHz	2	Capital South
105.2 MHz	10	Greatest Hits Radio South Coast
106.0 MHz	4	Nation Radio South Coast
107.0 MHz	0.1	Isle of Wight Radio

=== Digital radio ===
Frequency	Block	kW	Operator
216.928 MHz	11A	10	Sound Digital Limited
221.352 MHz	11C	10	NOW South Hampshire
222.064 MHz	11D	10	Digital One

=== Analogue television ===
VHF analogue television was transmitted from Chillerton Down from its launch in 1958 until the nationwide shutdown of VHF signals in 1985.

Frequency	VHF	kW	Service
204.75 MHz	11	100	TVS (Southern Television until 1982)

== See also ==
- List of masts
- List of tallest buildings and structures in Great Britain
