= Chillerton Down =

Downland on the Isle of Wight, England

- Downland
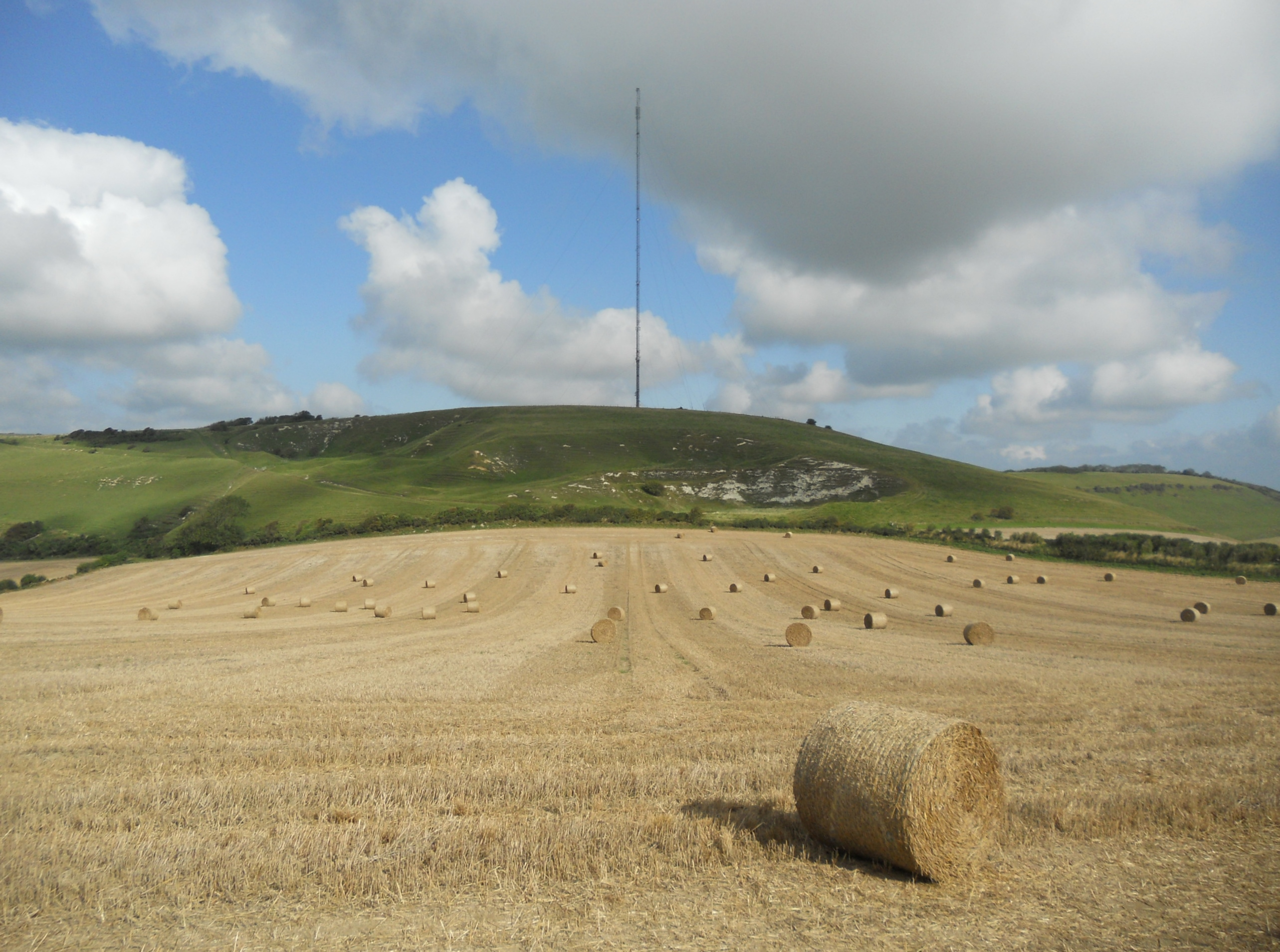

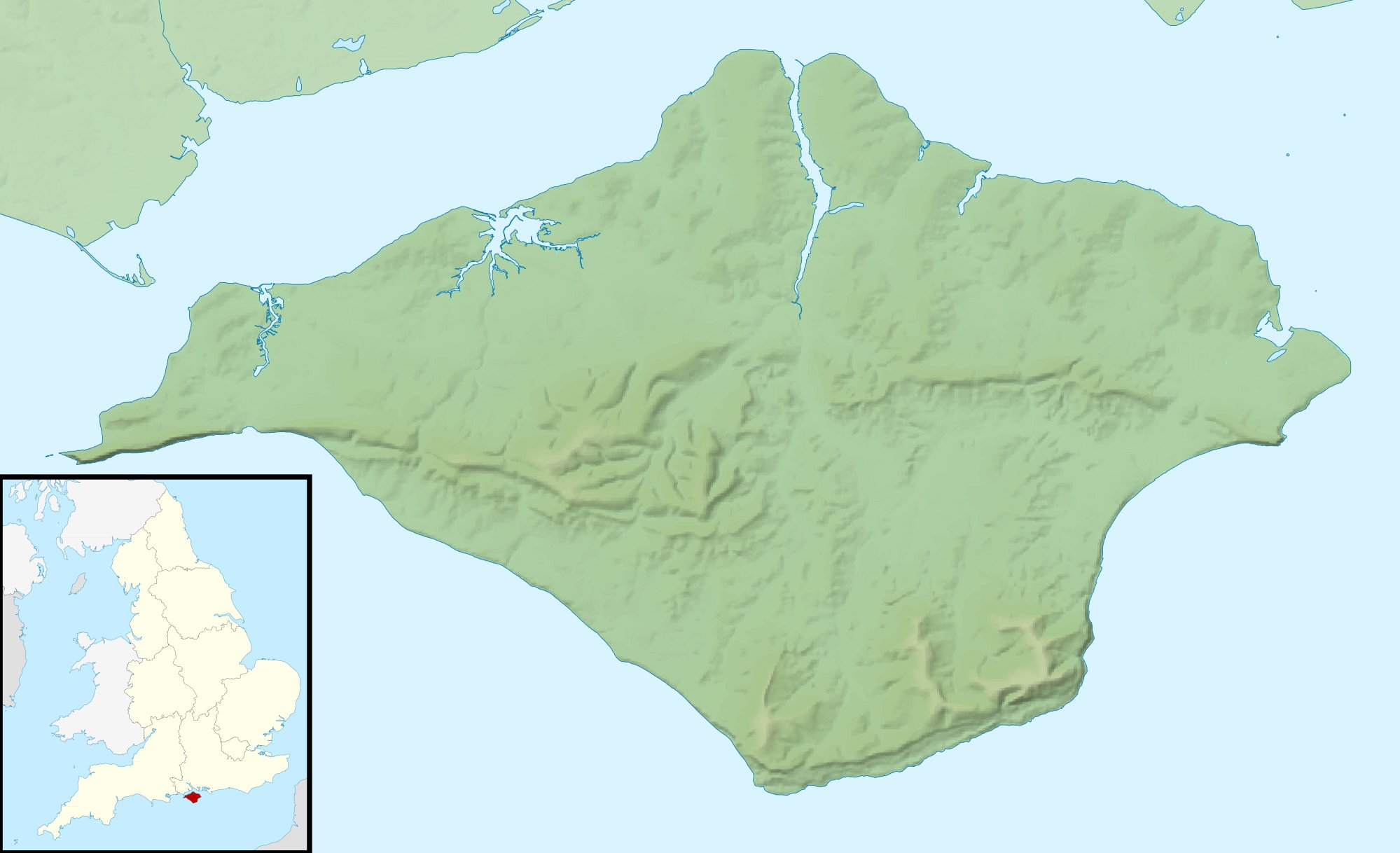
- Location within Isle of Wight
- Coordinates: 50°39′6″N 1°19′25″W
- Grid position: SZ 479 838
- Location: near Chillerton, Isle of Wight

Dimensions
  - Drop: 61 metres (200 ft)
- Elevation: 167 m (548 ft)

Chillerton Down is downland between the villages of Shorwell and Chillerton, on the Isle of Wight, England.

== Description ==
The highest point of the hill is 167 metres (548 ft), and its prominence is 61 metres (200 ft). There is a trig point within 2 metres of the summit. Part of Chillerton Down is a property of the National Trust. Chillerton Down transmitting station is nearby.

=== "Five Barrows" earthworks ===
Across a spur of the hill running north-east to south-west, there are earthworks, originally a rampart, thought to be an unfinished promontory fort of the Iron Age. The feature has been called the Five Barrows, because it has sunk in places, giving the appearance of separate mounds. The rampart is about 84 metres (276 ft) long, 5 metres (16 ft) wide and up to 3 metres (9.8 ft) high, and there is a depression, formerly a ditch, on the south-west side.
