= St Olave's Church, Gatcombe =

Church on the Isle of Wight, England

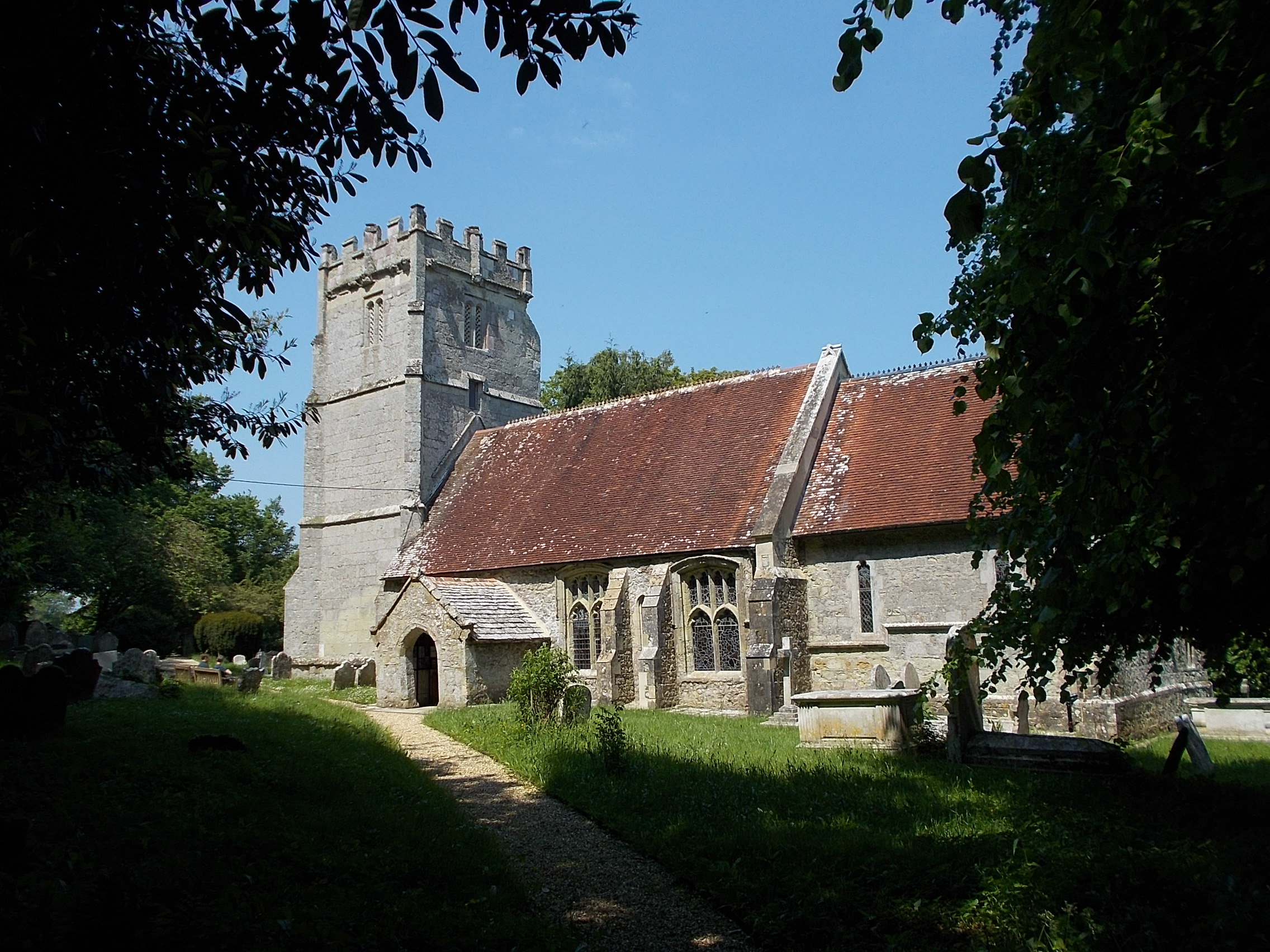
- St Olave's Church, Gatcombe
- 50°39′49″N 01°18′15″W
- Denomination: Church of England
- Churchmanship: Broad Church
- Website: www.stolaves.church

History
- Dedication: St Olave's

Administration
- Province: Canterbury
- Diocese: Portsmouth
- Parish: Gatcombe

St Olave's Church, Gatcombe is a parish church in the Church of England located in Gatcombe, Isle of Wight. It is grouped with Sts Thomas Minster, Newport, St John's, Newport and St Mary's, Carisbrooke.

== History ==
Building began on the site in the 13th century and the church was dedicated in 1292. It originally served the Estur family as a chapel to Gatcombe House. The manor later passed into the hands of the Worsley family who provided the church with both financial support and a number of Rectors. The font is probably early 13th-century. The chancel was rebuilt by R. J. Jones in 1864–65; and the church was further restored by W. D. Caröe in c.1920.

The tower contains three bells which are hung dead.

== Stained glass ==
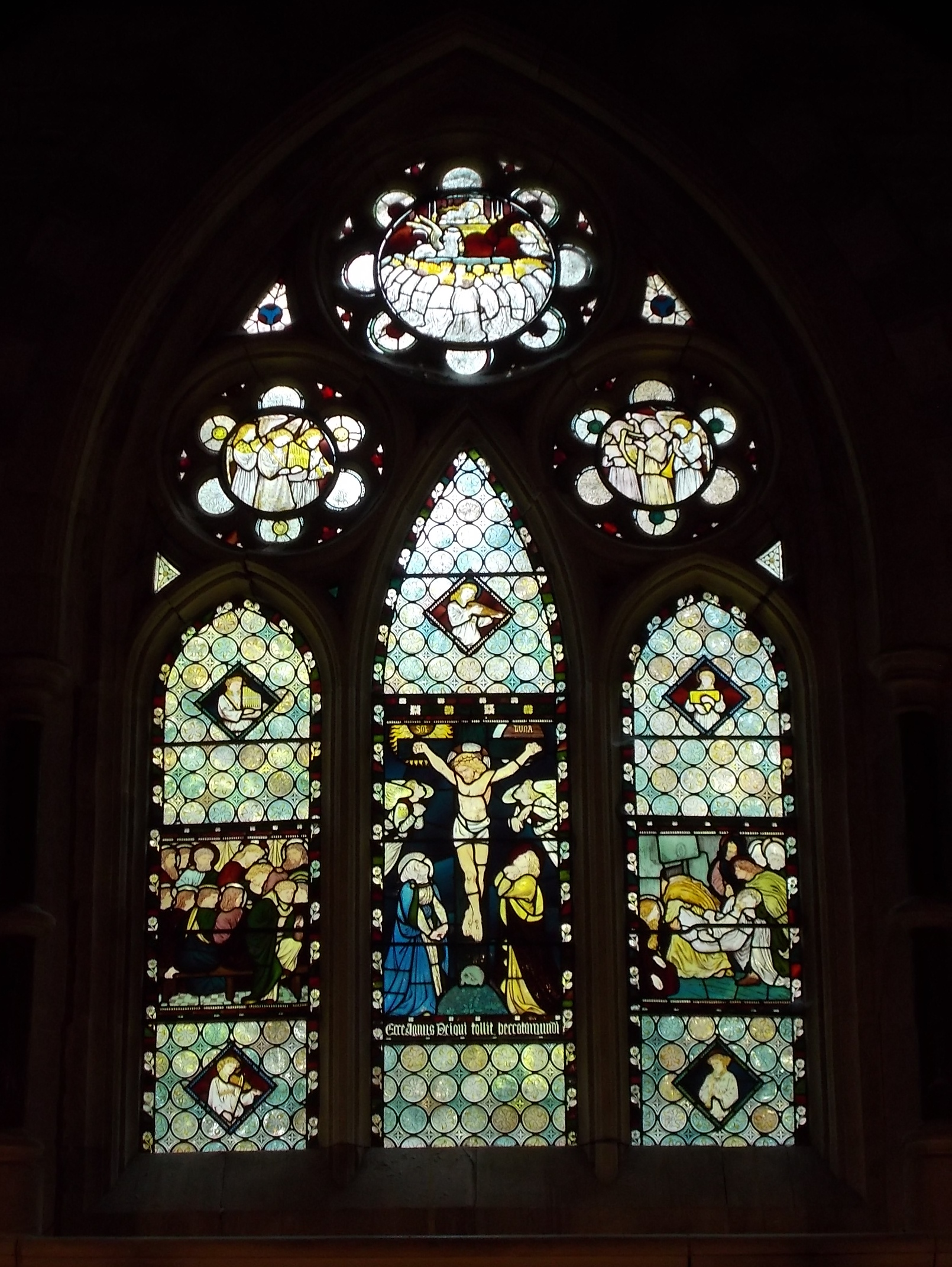
East window

The church is noted for its stained glass by William Morris, Dante Gabriel Rossetti, Ford Madox Brown and Edward Burne-Jones, dating from 1865 and 1866. Rossetti founded the Pre-Raphaelite Brotherhood with which Morris, Brown and Burne-Jones were associated.

== Monuments ==
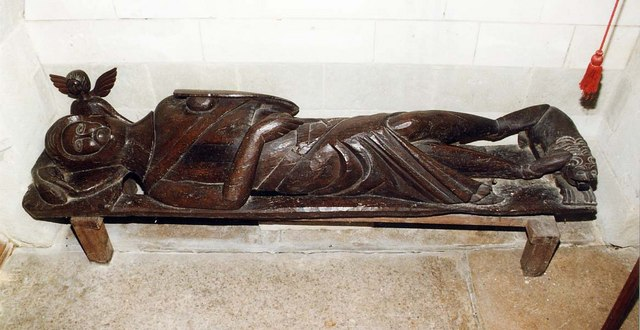
The wooden effigy

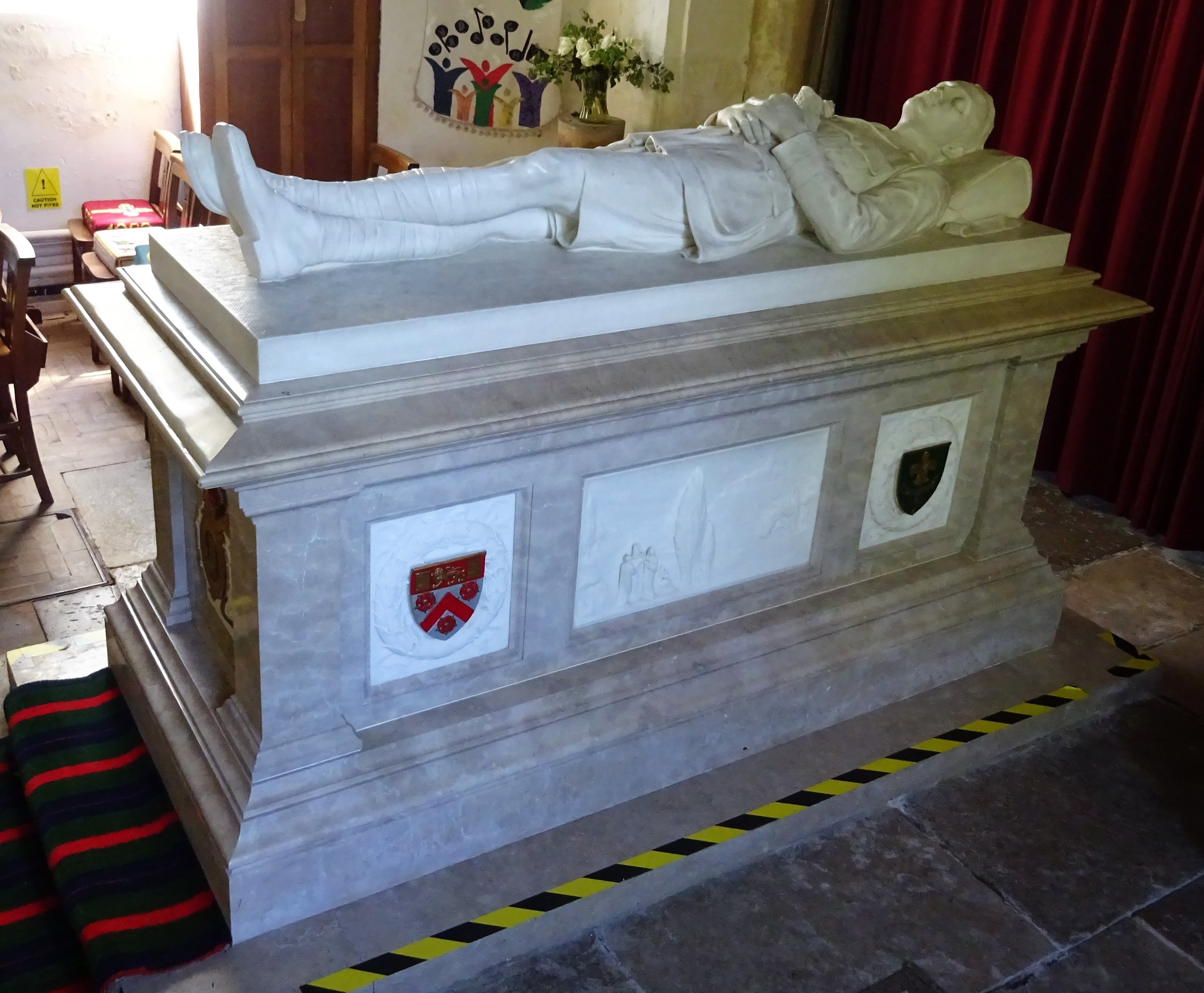
Memorial to Captain Charles Grant Seely (killed 1917)

A carved wooden military effigy with crossed legs in the style of the early 14th century lies in a recess in the chancel, on the north side of the altar. It has an angel by its head and a lion at its feet. Scholarly opinion is divided as to whether it is a genuine medieval figure, recut, restored and embellished at a later date; or an early modern concoction in deliberately archaic style. It has been speculatively identified as representing an ancestor of the Estur family. Various legends have been attached to it, and in the 1960s it inspired the "Lucy Lightfoot" hoax.

At the west end of the church stands a monument to Captain Charles Grant Seely, eldest son and heir of Sir Charles Seely, 2nd Baronet, who was killed in action serving with the Isle of Wight Rifles at the Second Battle of Gaza in 1917 and is buried in Gaza War Cemetery. It takes the form of a tomb chest bearing a recumbent effigy of Seely, who is depicted in uniform and with legs crossed in allusion to his service as a modern-day "crusader". It was the final work of the eminent sculptor Sir Thomas Brock, and was unveiled in 1922. In 1927 it was vandalised by a local woman, Nellie Kerley, who appears to have been aggrieved by the contrast between the memorial's grandiosity and the relative neglect of the memory of her brother, who had also died in the war. The damage to the effigy's face and sword-hilt is still clearly visible.

== Organ ==
The organ was built by Henry Speechly in 1919. It was donated to the church by Sir Charles and Lady Seely as a memorial to the officers, NCOs and men of the Isle of Wight Rifles who had died in the First World War, and was dedicated in September 1922 on the same occasion as the unveiling of the monument to Charles Grant Seely. The organ chamber was designed by W. D. Caröe. The organ was overhauled in 2000 by Griffiths & Cooper and incorporated pipework from an organ in Upper Chine School, Shanklin. A specification can be found on the National Pipe Organ Register.

== Churchyard ==
The churchyard contains two Commonwealth war graves, of an officer (Flight Lieutenant Antony Basil Langton) and a sergeant (Sergeant William Reuben Cooper) of the Royal Air Force Volunteer Reserve from World War II.

== Gallery ==
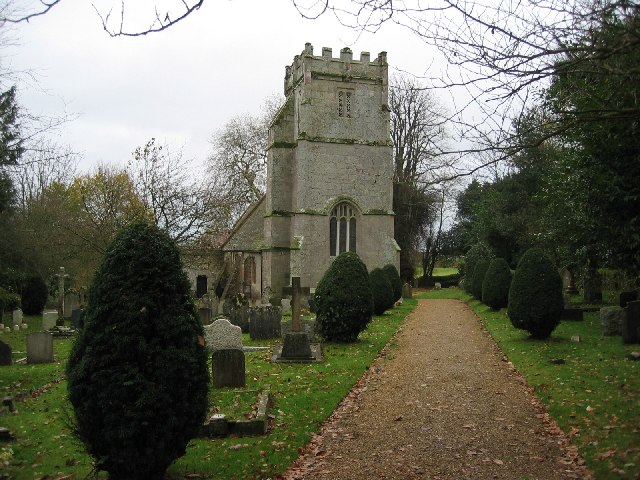
View from the west

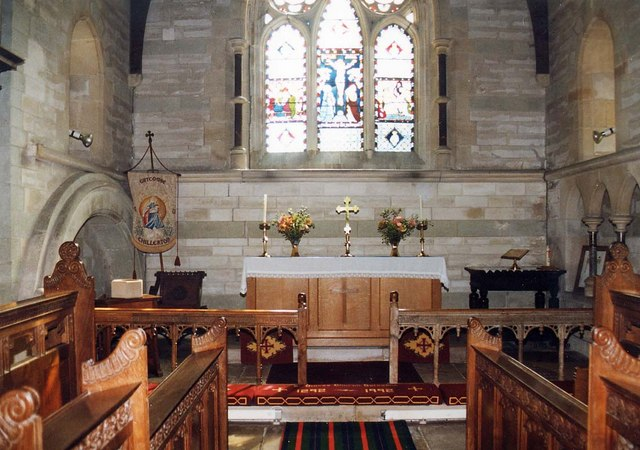
Sanctuary

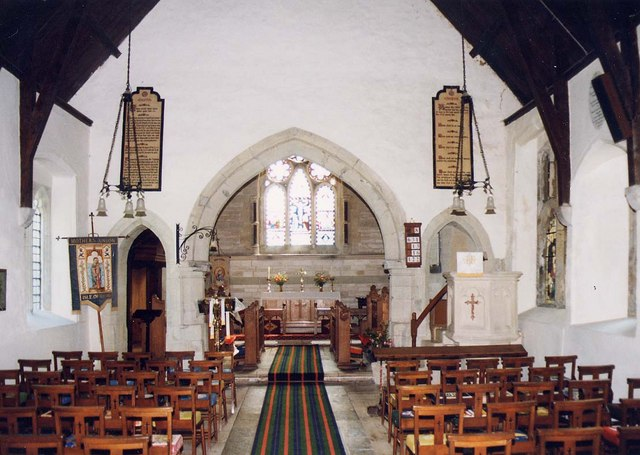
East end

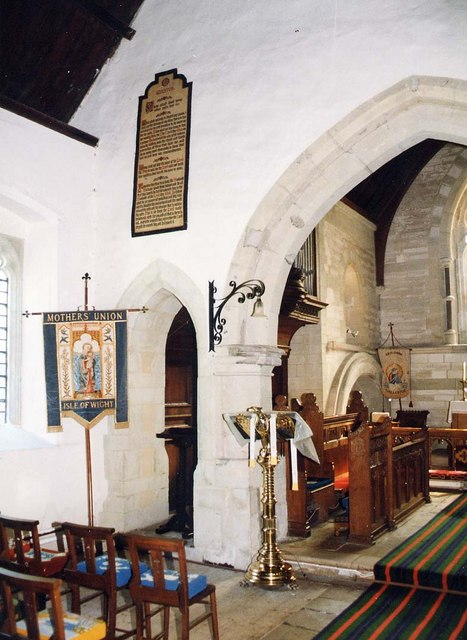
Interior

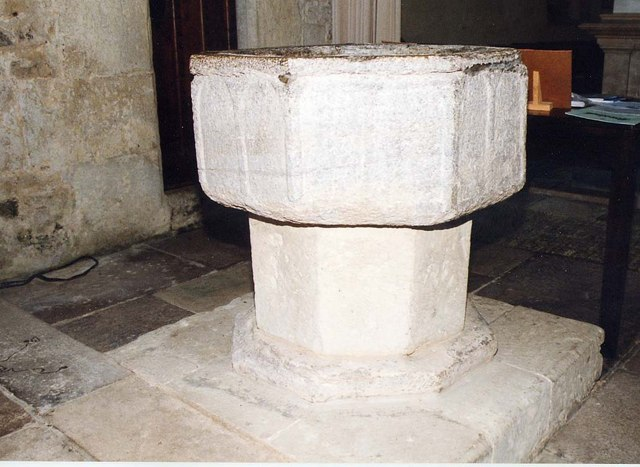
Font

== See also ==
- List of current places of worship on the Isle of Wight
