= Chillerton =

Village on the Isle of Wight, England

Coordinates: 50.656°N 1.306°W

- Village
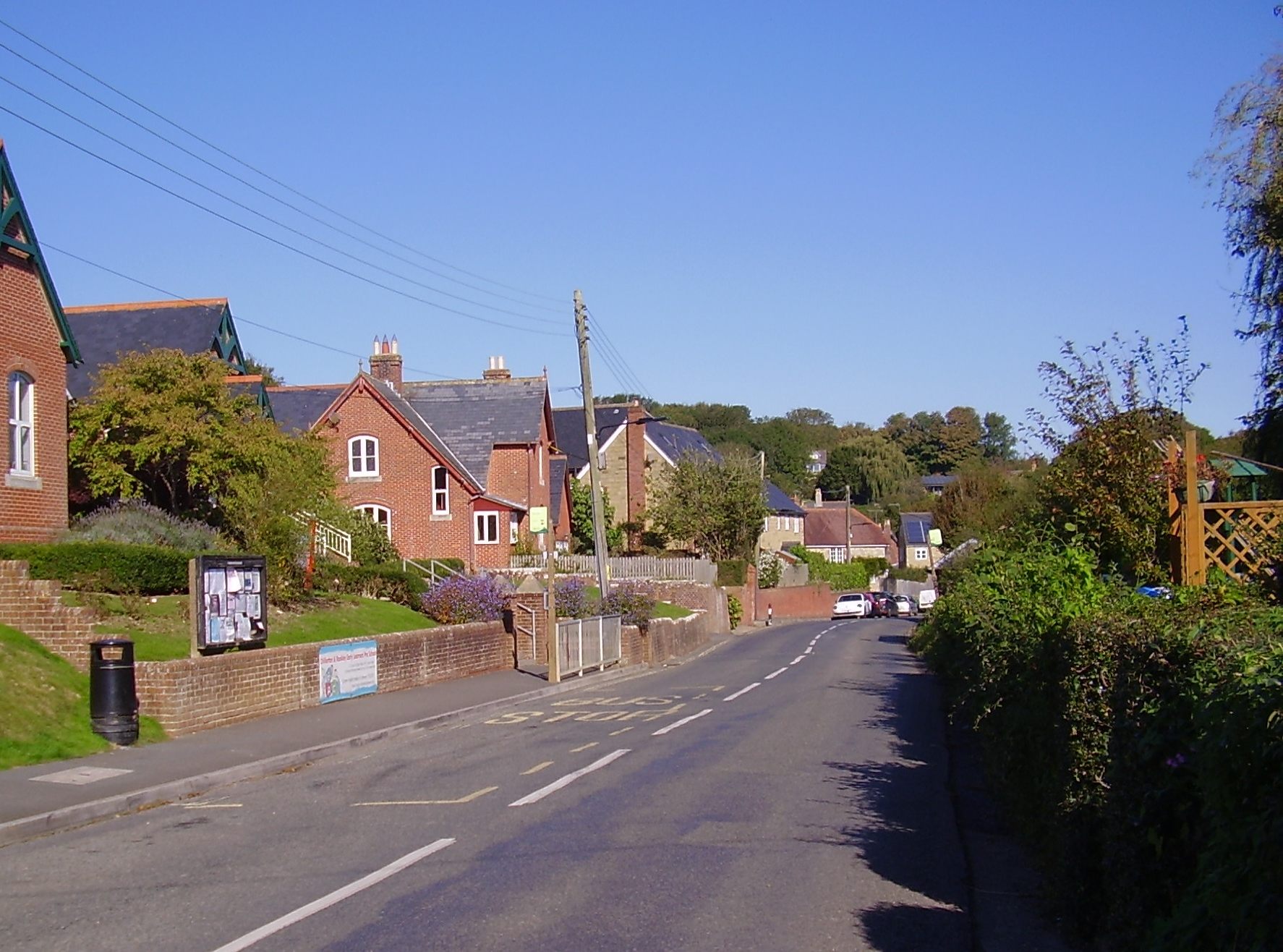
- The village of Chillerton

- Location within the Isle of Wight
- Population: 422 (parish, 2011, including Gatcombe)
- OS grid reference: SZ488392
- Civil parish: Chillerton and Gatcombe
- Unitary authority: Isle of Wight
- Ceremonial county: Isle of Wight
- Region: South East
- Country: England
- Sovereign state: United Kingdom
- Post town: NEWPORT
- Postcode district: PO30
- Dialling code: 01983
- Police: Hampshire and Isle of Wight
- Fire: Hampshire and Isle of Wight
- Ambulance: Isle of Wight
- UK Parliament: Isle of Wight West

Chillerton is a village between Newport and Chale in the Isle of Wight in southern England. Chillerton is in the middle of a farming community. It is in the civil parish of Chillerton and Gatcombe, along with nearby Gatcombe. The parish had a total population of 422 at the 2011 census. The village is set in a valley eroded by a tributary of the River Medina.

== Name ==
The name probably means 'the enclosed farmstead in a valley', from Old English ceole, geard and tūn. The name could also mean 'the farmstead belonging to a man called Cēolheard', from Old English Cēolheard (personal name) and tūn.

1086 (Domesday Book): Celertune

1189-1204: Chelertona

1279: Cheliertone

1327: Chelyerton

1769: Chillerton Common, Down, Farm and Street

== Chillerton Down ==
The nearby Chillerton Down is the site of an unfinished Iron Age promontory fort (the only one of its type on the Isle of Wight, called Five Barrows) and a 229-metre (751 ft) antenna for the Isle of Wight radio station broadcasting on 107.00 MHz, as well as several other stations. It is the village's most prominent feature and can be seen from most parts of the island. It is known as the Chillerton Down transmitting station. Chillerton Down is flown by Paragliders in a E to SE wind and on days with good thermals the top of the mast can be reached.

== History ==
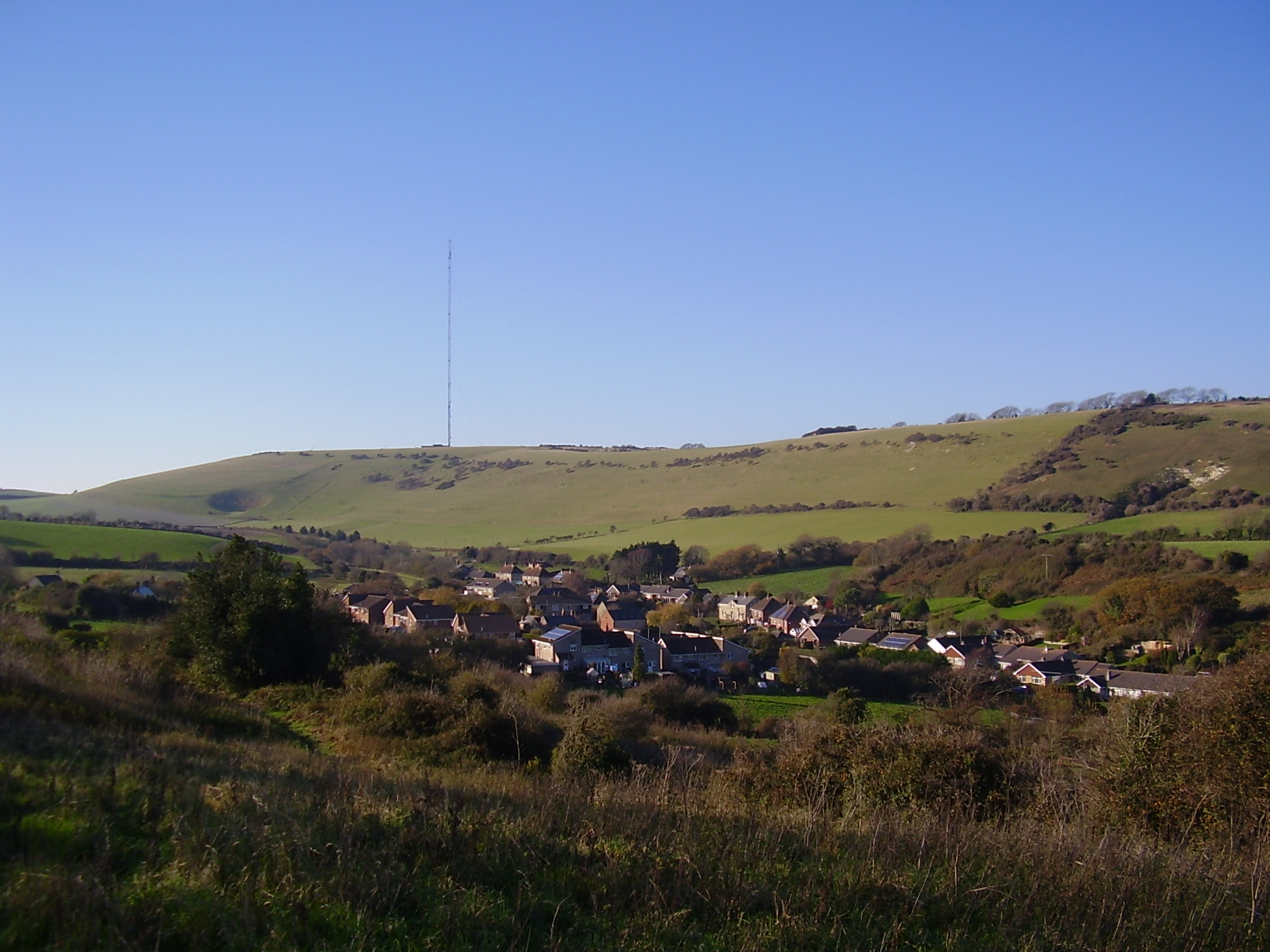
Village of Chillerton, with Chillerton Down and the radio mast behind

In the Domesday Book, it had a population of 3 households (2 smallholders, 1 slave) and had a value of 1 pound in 1066, and 1 pound 10 shillings in 1086.

Tenant-in-chief (1086): William son of Azur

Lord (1086): Geoffrey

Lord (1066): Blaecmann

In 1870–1872, it had a population of 244 and was considered a hamlet.

Chillerton was two distinct settlements: Chillerton and Chillerton Street.

In 1907, a contract was signed that ensured that properties older than 1907 in Chillerton and nearby Gatcombe would receive free water, while newer homes receive it at a reduced rate. In 2009 Southern Water proposed that everyone to pay the same rate, claiming that the reasoning behind the initial pact is now invalid, as the costs for the original project have since been paid off.

A scarecrow festival is held yearly.

== Village School ==
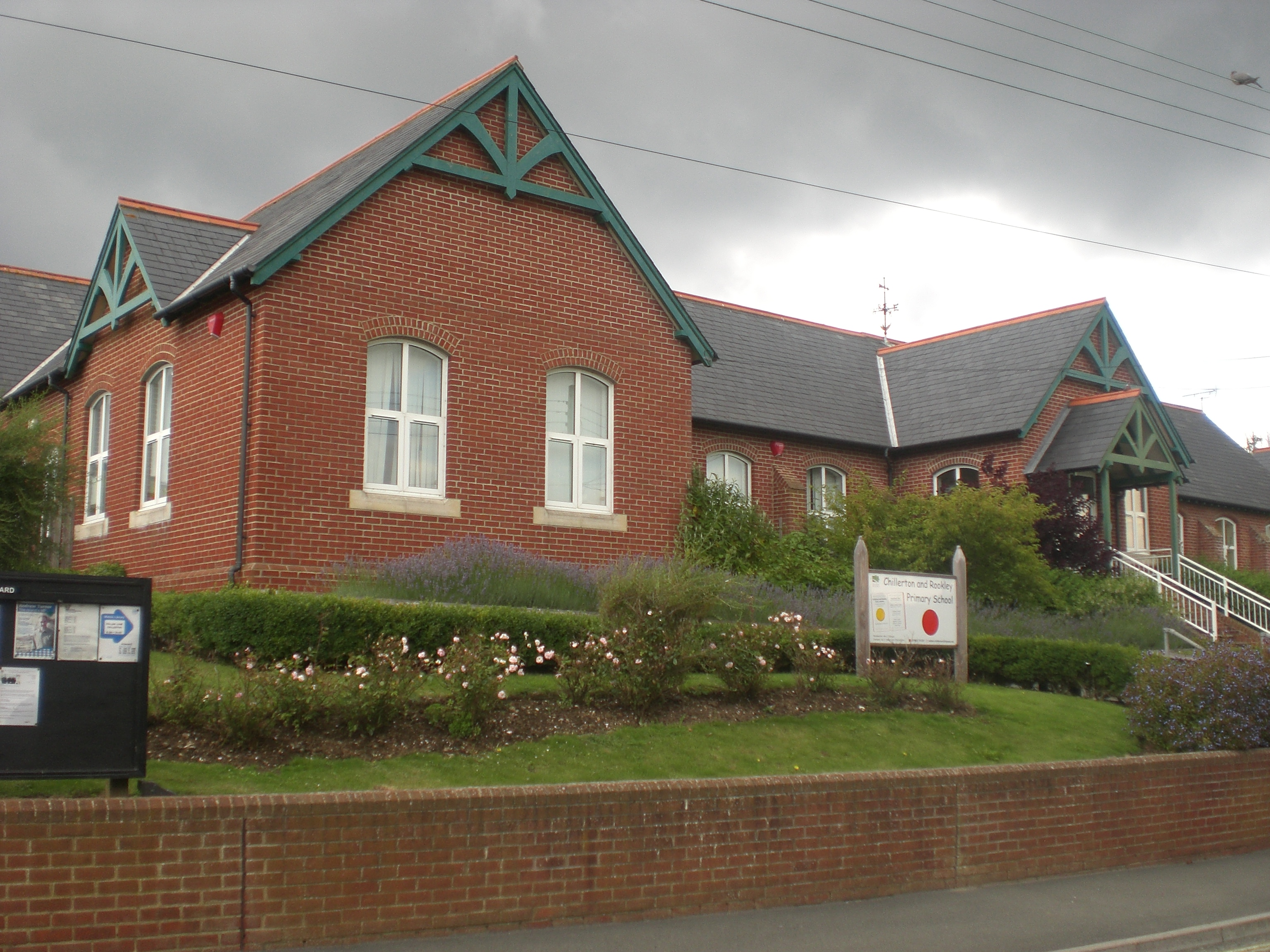
Chillerton and Rookley Primary School

The school was built in 1865. Originally, the main school was Chillerton and Rookley Primary School, located on the Main Road in Chillerton. It was a small village school with a total of 43 students on roll from local areas as of 2008. However, in 2010 it was announced that the school would be combining with primary schools in Godshill and Wroxall. The new school would have two campuses, in Godshill and Wroxall. Before its closure it had a roll of 9 students.

== Public transport ==
Public transport is provided by Southern Vectis bus route 6, which runs between Newport and Ventnor and Wightbus route 36, running between Newport and Moortown.
