= Spherical Objects =

Late 1970s music band

- Origin: Manchester, England
- Genre: post-punk
- Years active: 1978–1981
- Label: Object Records
- Past members: Steve Solamar (Guitar, Vocals, Harmonica); John Bisset Smith (Guitar, Vocals); Frederick Burrows (Bass, Guitar); Duncan Prestbury (Keyboards, Vocals); Roger Hilton (Drums)

Spherical Objects were a band in the Manchester, UK-based experimental independent post-punk scene of the late 70s (including other more or less experimental groups like The Passage, Steve Miro & The Eyes, Tirez Tirez and Grow Up). All these bands were hosted under the Object Music record label. Many of them shared musicians, thus the movement looked more like a musical collective (there was indeed a Manchester Musicians Collective, co-founded by Dick Witts of The Passage).

== History ==
The leader and "heart of the band" was Steve Solamar, a musician whose previous experience included being in Joe Panic band and DJing for two Sex Pistols concerts at the Electric Circus. While in Joe Panic, Solamar experimented with widening vocal range, developing a peculiar vocal style that has been described as either "terrible", or "idiosyncratic".

In summer 1978, the band recorded their first LP, Past And Parcel. The second and third LP, described as "their best", are Elliptical Optimism (1979) and Further Ellipses (1980). The former still keeps contact with punk and 60s garage sound. Further Ellipses somewhere departs from the DIY sound of previous releases and puts more emphasis on ultra-romantic melodic synthesizer tunes (The "Final Part", "The Root"), a small share of Latin guitar melancholy and a better polished production. Nevertheless, tracks like Set Free betray the strong influence of gospel & rhythm & blues; an unusual feature for a British post-punk band of that period.

In 1980, Solamar collaborated with Steve Miro as the Noyes (i.e. "noise") Brothers, to produce more experimental music forms. They recorded a double LP (Sheep From Goats), which was far more unconventional than anything they had created with their own bands. Other Solamar projects were Warriors and Alternomen Unlimited, while John Bisset Smith was involved into the band Grow Up (all recording for Object Music, label established by Solamar).

In 1981, Spherical Objects recorded their last LP, No Man's Land. It was a return to more archetypal rock forms like those perverted and twisted in Elliptical Optimism.

After 1981 very little information exists for Solamar or other Spherical Objects members. Solamar, whose lyrics had already addressed gender dysphoria, began a gender transition to female and, soon after No Man's Land, disbanded Spherical Objects and stopped supporting the Object Music label, because she wanted to make a "radical change" in her life. Duncan Prestbury is now teaching at The Manchester College (formerly City College Manchester) and playing nu jazz. He is also the co-founder of the production companies ganzfeldmusic and FireTrain Music. Between 2008 and 2010 LTM undertook an extensive Object Music reissue program, including CD versions of all four Spherical Objects albums as well as the Noyes Brothers set.

== Band members ==
- Steve Solamar (Guitar, Vocals, Harmonica)
- John Bisset Smith (Guitar, Vocals)
- Frederick Burrows (Bass, Guitar)
- Duncan Prestbury (Keyboards, Vocals)
- Roger Hilton (Drums)

== Discography ==
- Past And Parcel - Object Music (LP, 1978) (CD, 2008)
- The Kill/The Knot - Object Music (7", 1978)
- Seventies Romance/Sweet Tooth - Object Music (7", 1979)
- Objectivity The Object Singles Album (various artists compilation, Object Music, 1979)
- Elliptical Optimism - Object Music (LP, 1979) (CD, 2008)
- Further Ellipses - Object Music (LP, 1980) (CD, 2008)
- No Man's Land - Object Music (LP, 1981) (CD, 2008)
