= Gatcombe House =

Building in Gatcombe, Isle of Wight, England

- Location within Isle of Wight

General information
- Location: Gatcombe, United Kingdom
- Coordinates: 50.6626°N 1.3040°W

Gatcombe House is a 15,234 sq ft (1,415.3 m^{2}) manor house in Gatcombe on the Isle of Wight, England. The original building was constructed by the Stur (Estur) family as noted in the Domesday Book. St. Olave's Church, built next to the manor to serve as its chapel, was dedicated in 1292. It also belonged at one time to the Lisles of Wootton.

The present stone building stands in hanging woods. It was erected in 1750 by Sir Edward Meux Worsley (c. July 1716 – August 14, 1762), and is typical of the country houses of the time of George III. The manor was afterwards purchased by Alexander Baring, 1st Baron Ashburton. It was later owned by Sir Charles Seely, 1st Baronet. Gatcombe House has been a Grade II*-listed building since July 1951.

== Early owners and residents ==
Sir Edward Worsley (1716-1762) built the current house in 1751. He was part of a wealthy land owning family from Appuldurcombe House in the Isle of Wight. In 1737 he married Elizabeth Miller (1715-1774) who was the daughter of Sir John Miller of Froyle. The couple had seven children. When Edward died in 1762 his eldest son Edward Meux Worsley became the owner of the house.

Edward Meux Worsley (1747-1782) married twice. His first wife had one daughter named Elizabeth. His second wife was Elizabeth Holmes (1759 - 1832) who was the daughter of Lord Leonard Holmes. The couple had one son William Meux Wolsey (1776-1783) and a daughter Jane Meux Worsley (1774-1820). Edward died at the age of 35 and left his estate to his son William. However William died a year after his father so the estate was divided between his two daughters. Jane became the owner of Gatcombe House. However, as she was still a minor it was held in trust and rented to wealthy tenants.

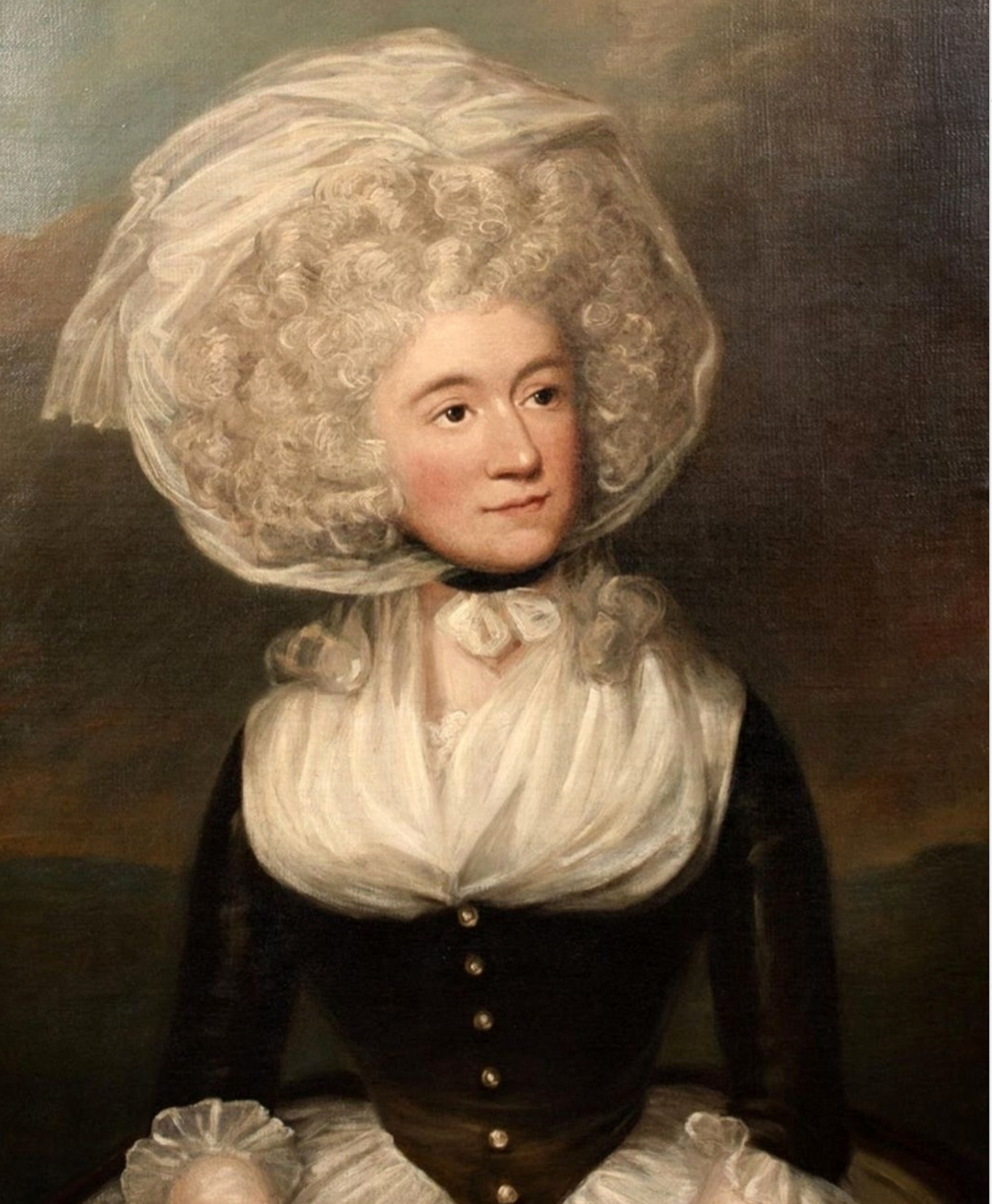
Mrs Rattray by George Romney 1790

One of these tenants was Colonel James Rattray who was in the naval service of the East India Company. His wife Henrietta was painted by George Romney in about 1790 which was when the couple were residents of Gatcombe House. The portrait is shown. In the same year John Hassell visited the Isle of Wight and made the following observations about Gatcombe House.

"This mansions is sheltered at the back and has an agreeable prospect. It is chiefly constructed of brick without any external ornaments but there is a great degree of neatness and simplicity in the appearance of it.

A fine lawn spreads its verdant turf before the house and extends to the road. On its side front a prospect still more charming is seen."

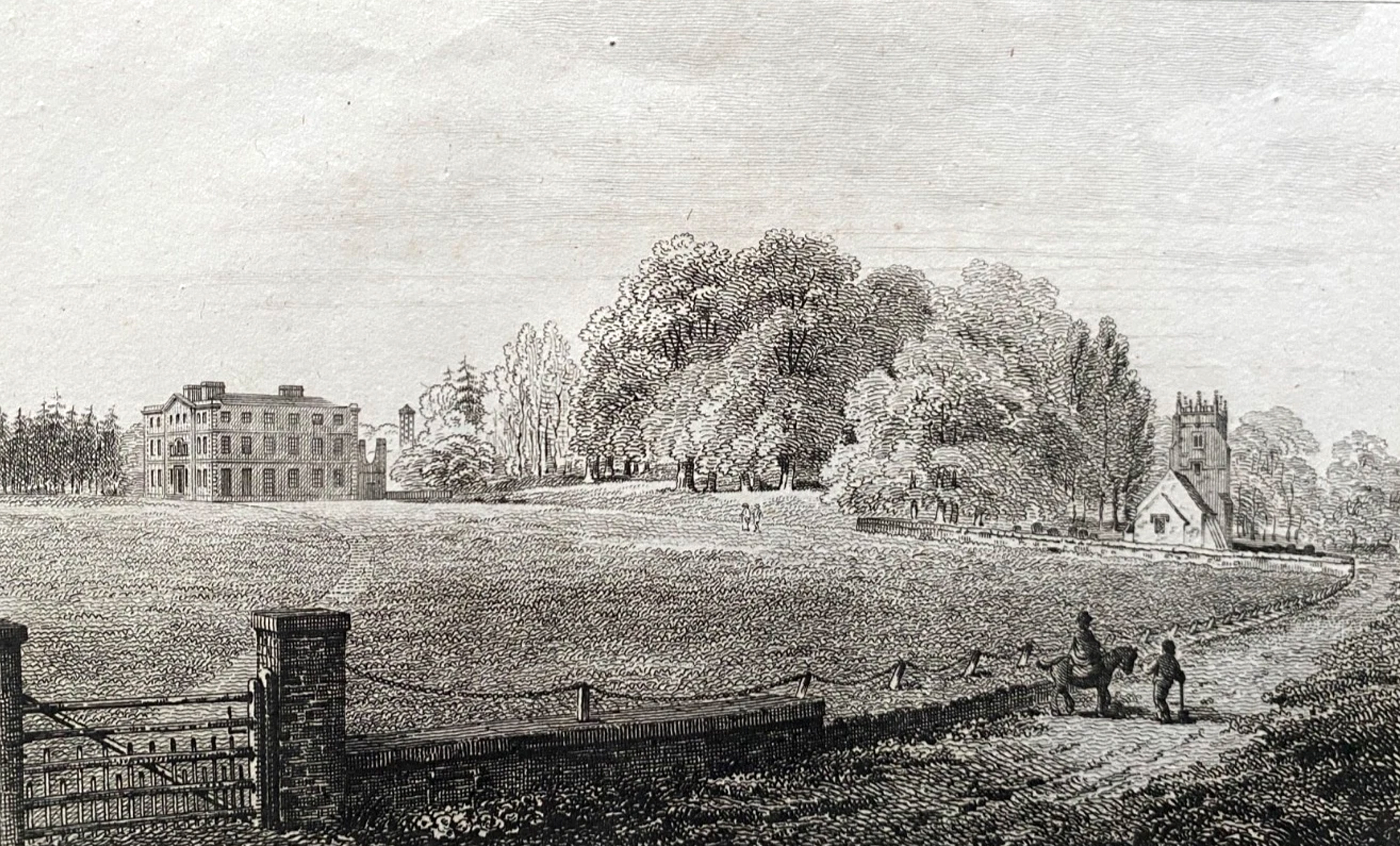
Gatcombe House 1808

Jane Meux Worsley, the owner of the house, married Alexander Campbell {1766 -1844) in 1795 and the couple moved into the property. Alexander made extensive landscaping changes with the planting of specimen trees, fruit trees, and rare plants. In 1808 William Bernard Cooke the engraver visited the Isle of Wight and made a sketch of Gatcombe House which is shown.

Alexander sold the house in 1843 to Alexander Baring, 1st Baron Ashburton, a very wealthy financier. He rented the property to notable tenants. One of these was Captain Hugh Berners (1801-1891) whose family were residents from 1846 until about 1860. The next tenant was Charles Wyatt Estcourt who was the Deputy Governor of Isle of Wight. He died in 1866 and his brother Arthur Harbottle Estcourt became the tenant. He was followed by John Lane who died at the house. The next tenant was Walter Langton (1823-1896) who is recorded in the 1881 Census with his wife Letitia and four children. He remained there until his death in 1896. He is buried with his wife in St Olave's Churchyard. In 1900 Countess Mary Pappenheim rented the house until 1909. She was a rich American heiress who had married Count Max Pappenheim in 1890. Her story was told by her daughter in 1919. She is recorded in the 1901 England Census as living at Gatcombe House with her daughter and five servants.

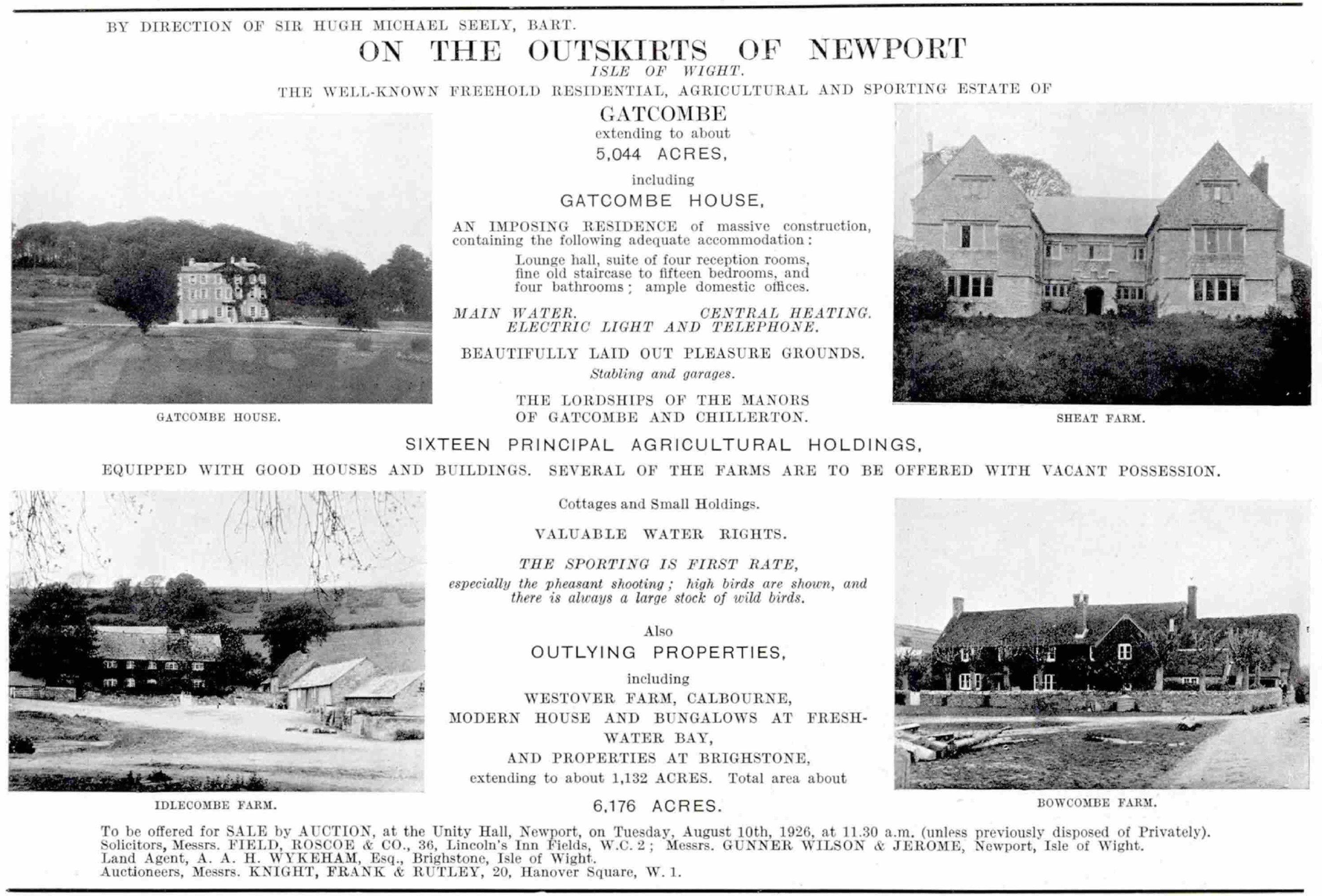
Advertisement for the sale of the Gatcombe Estate in 1926

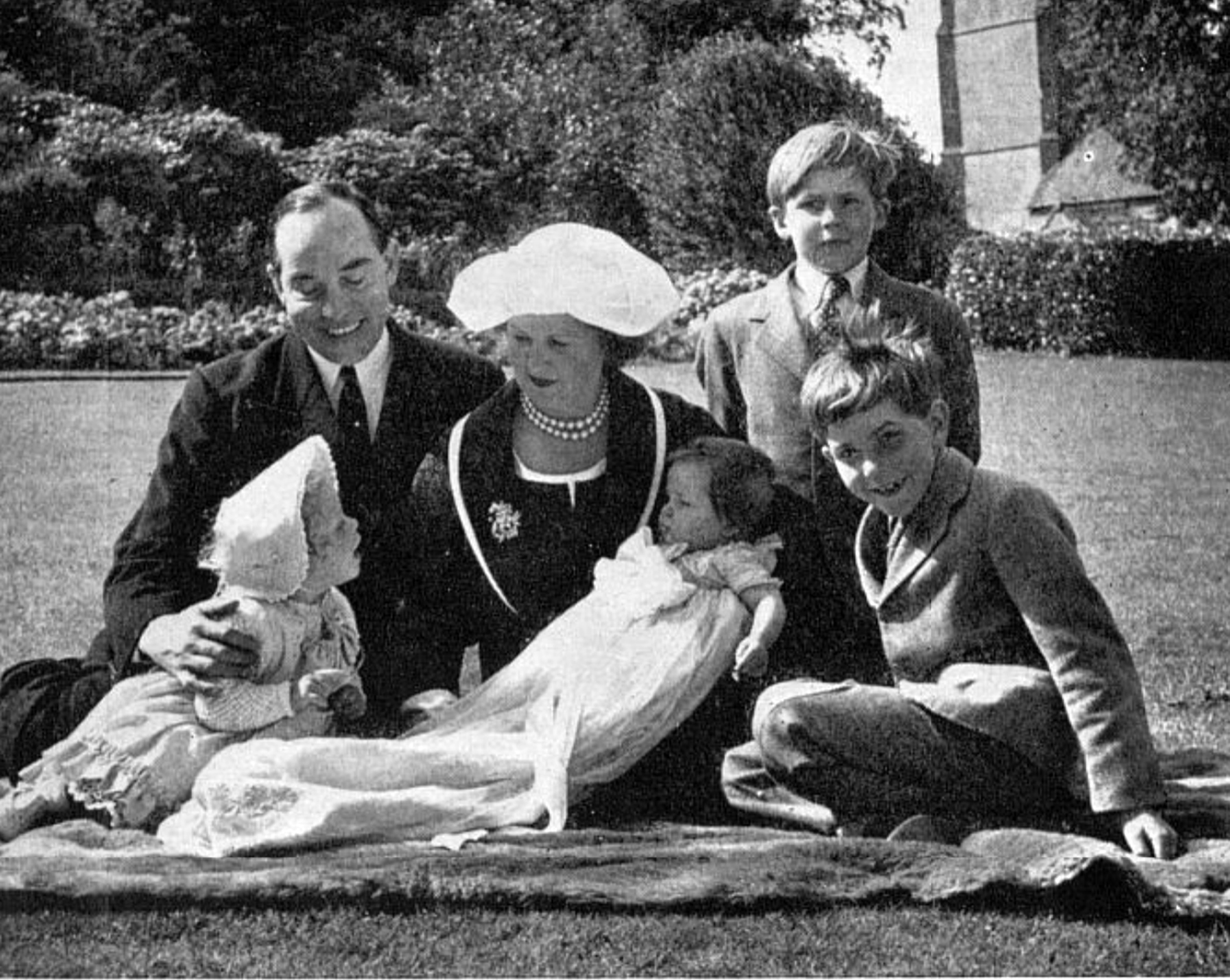
Sir Robert and Lady Sylvia Hobart and their four children at Gatcombe House in 1956

In 1873 Alexander Baring sold the property to Charles Seely (1803-1887) whose family owned the house until 1926. Charles lived at Brooke House on the Isle of Wight and continued to rent Gatcombe House to the tenants mentioned above. He died in 1887 and his son Sir Charles Seely, 1st Baronet (1833-1915) inherited the property. Sir Charles was a Member of Parliament, an industrialist, a wealthy landowner and a notable philanthropist. He continued renting the house until 1914 when he allowed it to become the Seely Red Cross Hospital for the duration of the War. When he died in 1915 his eldest son Sir Charles Hilton Seely, 2nd Baronet (1859-1926) inherited the house and continued to allow the Red Cross to use it as a hospital. They left in 1919 and for some time Sir Charles used Gatcombe House as his residence. When he died in 1926 the whole Gatcombe Estate was advertised for sale. Sir Robert Hobart bought Gatcombe House.

Sir Robert Hobart 1st Baronet (1836-1928) was a member of parliament. He died two years after he bought the house and his son Sir Claude Vere Hobart 2nd Baronet (1870-1949) became the owner. He was in the Grenadier Guards and won a DSO for his services in South Africa. In 1900 he married Violet Verve Wylie (1879-1935) and the couple had one son. Unfortunately she died in a hunting accident in 1935. In the following year he married Lois Anne Popham (1868-1947). When Sir Claude died in 1949 his only son Sir Robert Hampden Hobart 3rd Baronet inherited the house.

Sir Robert Hampden Hobart (1915-1988) was a naval officer until he succeeded to his father's estates. In 1942 he married Sylvia Laughton Argo (1915-1965) and the couple had four children. A photo of the family was taken at Gatcombe House in 1956 which is shown. The Hobart family sold Gatcombe House by 1981.
