= Church of St Nicholas in Castro, Carisbrooke =

English parish church

Coordinates: 50°41′13″N 01°18′48″W

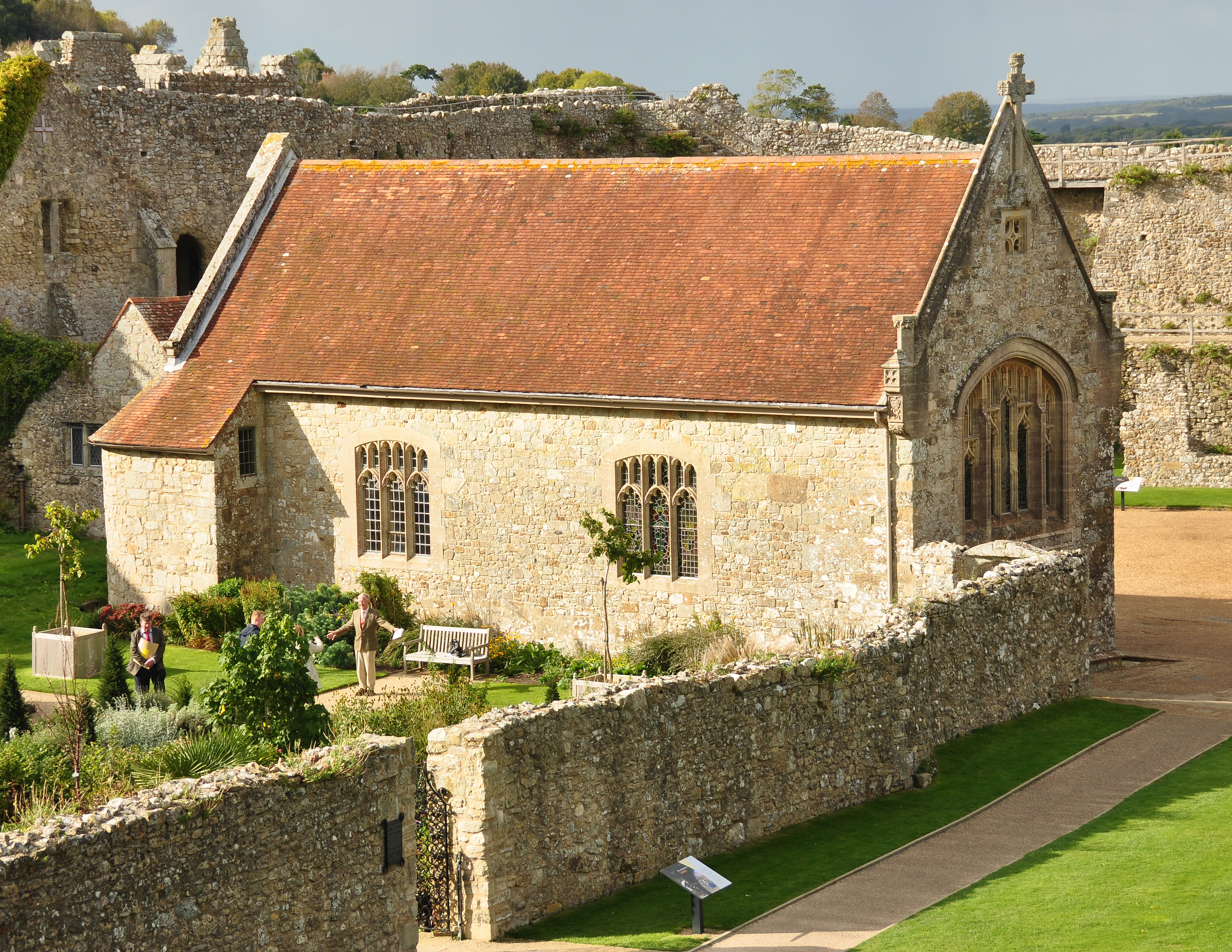
- The exterior of the chapel
- Church of St Nicholas in Castro, Carisbrooke
- Denomination: Church of England
- Churchmanship: Broad Church

History
- Dedication: St Nicholas

Administration
- Province: Canterbury
- Diocese: Portsmouth
- Parish: Carisbrooke

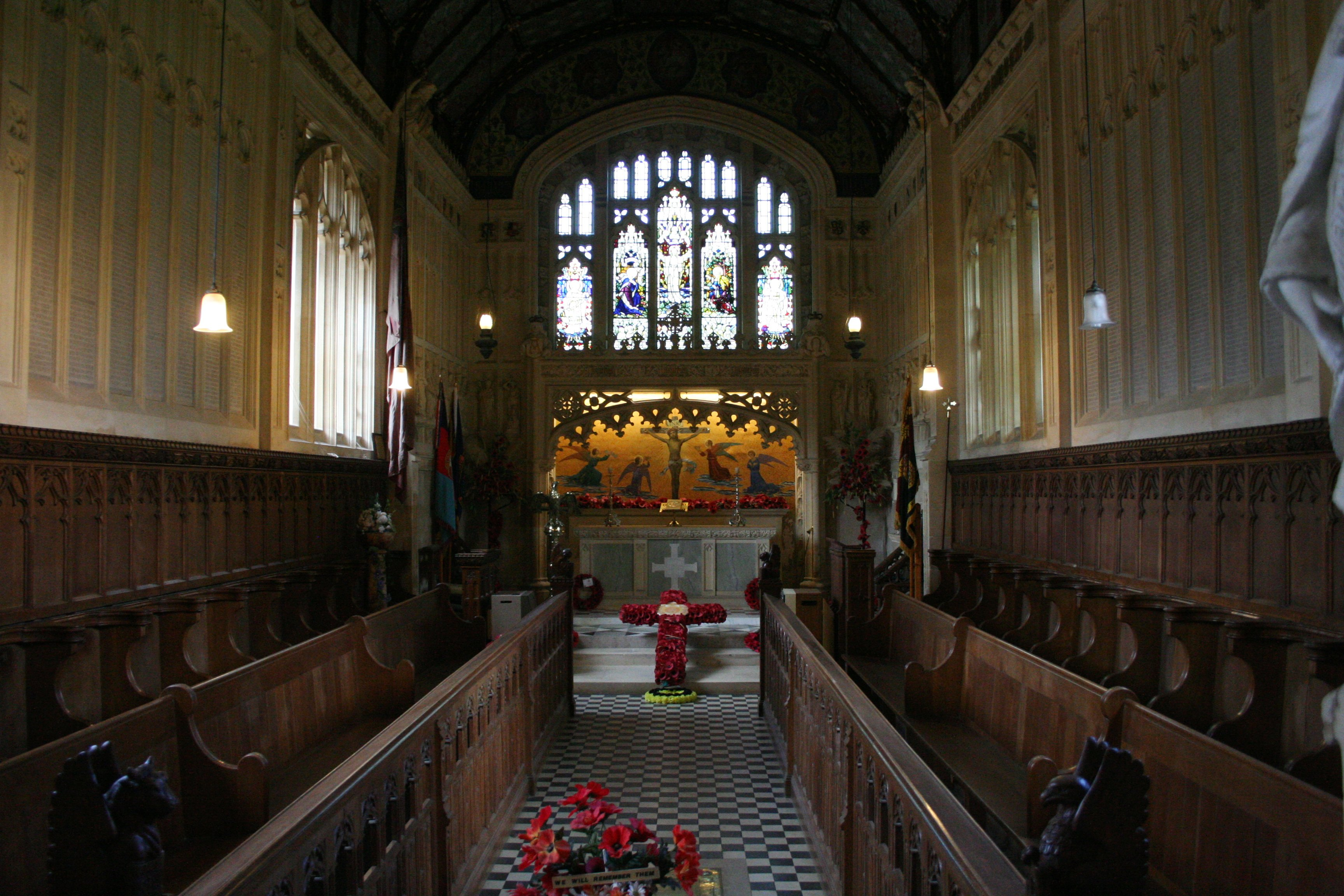
The interior of the church

The Church of St Nicholas in Castro, Carisbrooke is a parish church in the Church of England located in Carisbrooke, Isle of Wight.

== History ==
The church is the chapel (in Castro) of Carisbrooke Castle.

The chapel is located next to the main gate of the castle. In 1904 the chapel of St Nicholas in the castle was reopened and re-consecrated, having been rebuilt as a national memorial of King Charles I.

The chapel is home to the Isle of Wight County War Memorial, which was designed by local architect, Percy Stone (1856–1934).

== Church status ==
The church is grouped with St Mary's Church, Carisbrooke.

== Organ ==
The church has a two manual organ dating from 1908 by Bevington. A specification of the organ can be found on the National Pipe Organ Register.
