= Gatcombe =

Village on the Isle of Wight, England

Coordinates: 50.66°N 1.30°W

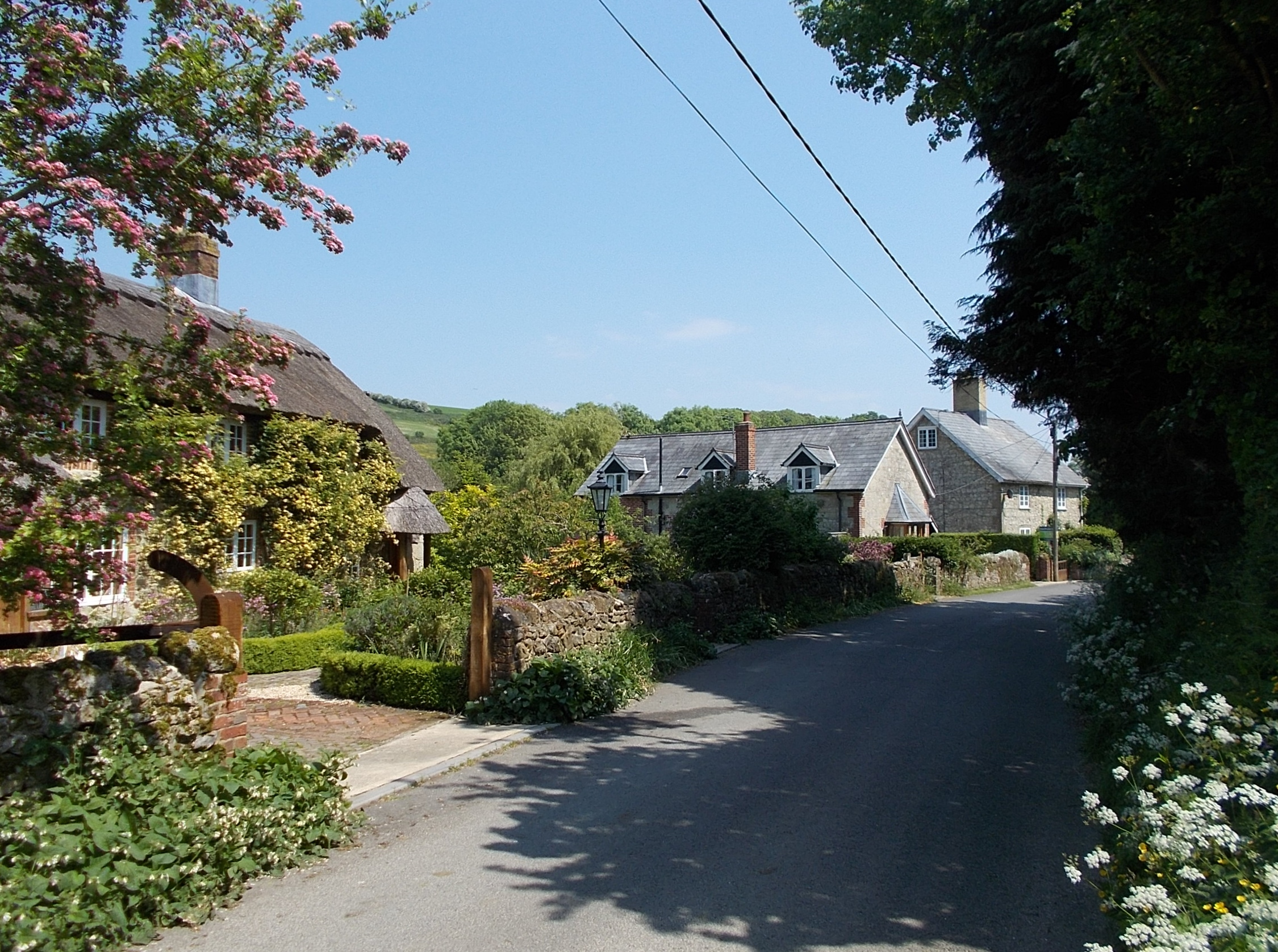
- Cottages in the village

- Location within the Isle of Wight
- Area: 11.24 km^{2} (4.34 sq mi)
- Population: 422 (parish, 2011 census, including Chillerton)
  - Density: 38/km^{2} (98/sq mi)
- OS grid reference: SZ493849
- Civil parish: Chillerton and Gatcombe
- Unitary authority: Isle of Wight
- Ceremonial county: Isle of Wight
- Region: South East
- Country: England
- Sovereign state: United Kingdom
- Post town: NEWPORT
- Postcode district: PO30
- Dialling code: 01983
- Police: Hampshire and Isle of Wight
- Fire: Hampshire and Isle of Wight
- Ambulance: Isle of Wight
- UK Parliament: Isle of Wight West

Gatcombe is a village in the civil parish of Chillerton and Gatcombe, on the Isle of Wight, England. It is located about two and a half miles south of Newport, in the centre of the island. The parish, which includes Chillerton, had a population of 422 at the 2011 census.

== Name ==
The name means 'the valley where the goats are kept', from Old English gāt (genitive plural gāta) and cumb. It is sometimes said to mean 'the gateway to the valley', but this is incorrect, as geat (Old English gate) would be yat(e) in an old name like this.

1086: Gatecombe

~1220: Gathecumbe

1223: Gatecumb

1261–1277: Gatecombe

1316: Gatecoumbe

== History and amenities ==
The parish church of St Olave's was dedicated in 1292, serving as a chapel to Gatcombe House and is a grade I listed building. Gatcombe parish was established in 1560. The civil parish was renamed from "Gatcombe" to "Chillerton and Gatcombe" in April 2013. The church contains stained glass of 1865–66 by William Morris, Dante Gabriel Rossetti, Ford Madox Brown and Edward Burne-Jones; a monument by Sir Thomas Brock to Captain Charles Grant Seely (killed 1917), unveiled in 1922; and a carved wooden effigy of medieval or early modern date around which various legends have developed.

In 1907, a contract was signed that ensured that properties older than 1907 in Gatcombe and nearby Chillerton would receive free water, while newer homes receive it at a reduced rate. In 2009 Southern Water proposed that all households should pay the same rate, claiming that the reasoning behind the initial pact is now invalid, as the costs for the original project have since been paid off. After being raised in Parliament by local MP Andrew Turner in June 2012, a meeting took place between Southern Water and local residents, but the water company maintained its position.

John Wheble, an author and antiquarian, was from Gatcombe.

Public transport is provided by Southern Vectis, which runs a line between Newport and Ventnor.

== Gallery ==
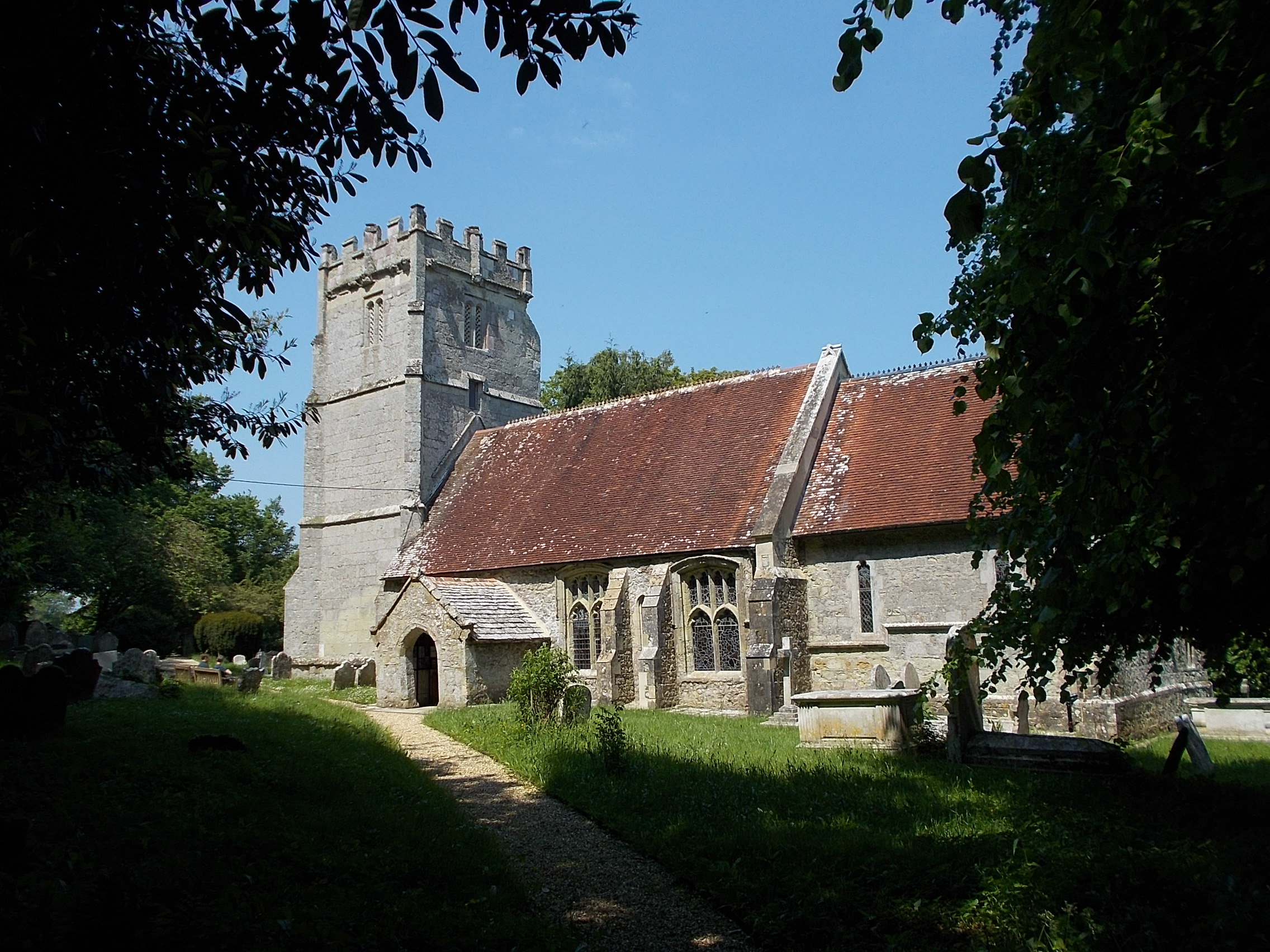
St Olave's Church, Gatcombe

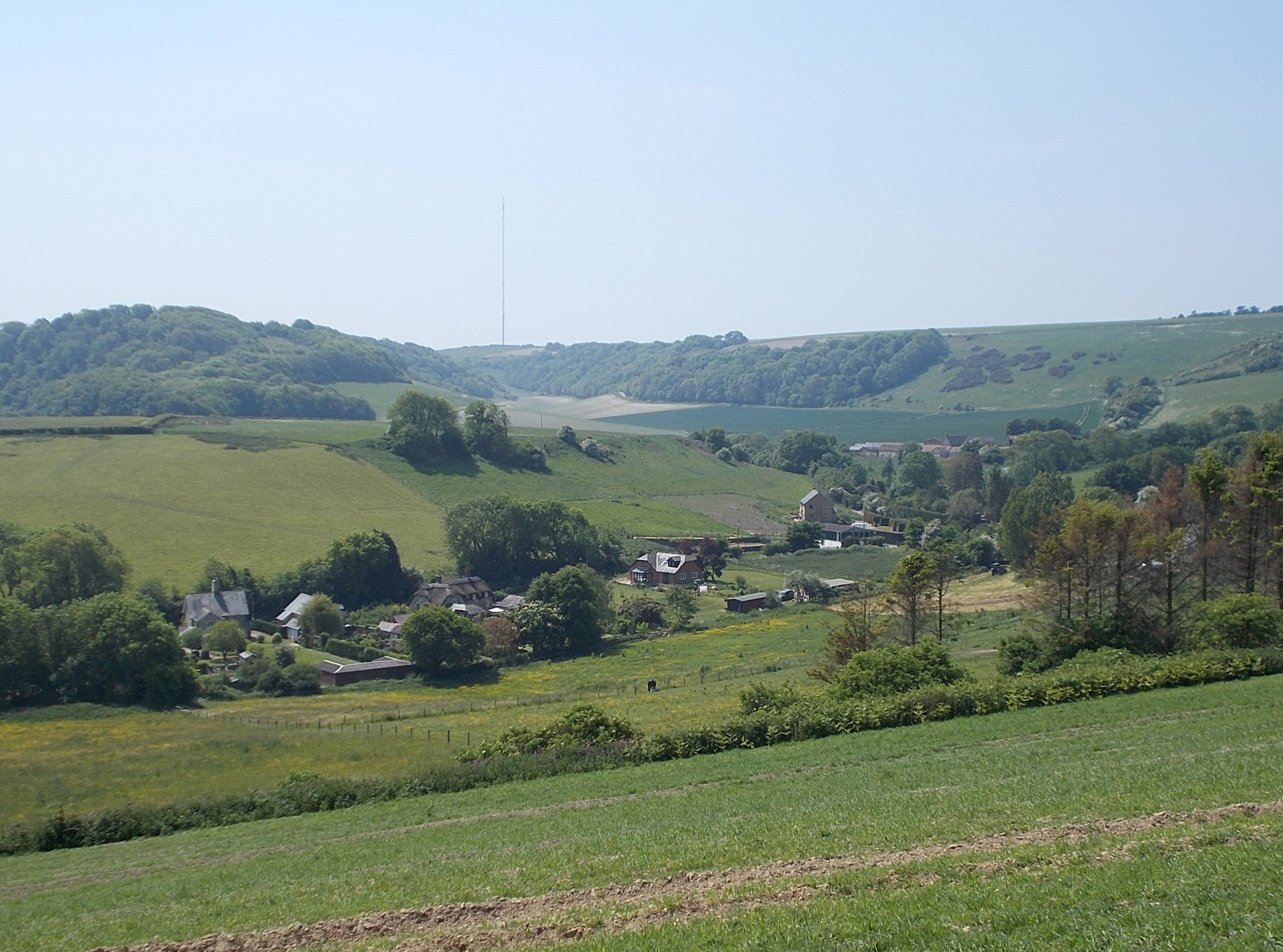
The village of Gatcombe set within rolling chalk downland
