= Sts Thomas Minster =

Church on the Isle of Wight, England

Coordinates: 50°41′59″N 01°17′37″W

Newport Minster (Sts Thomas, Newport, Isle of Wight)
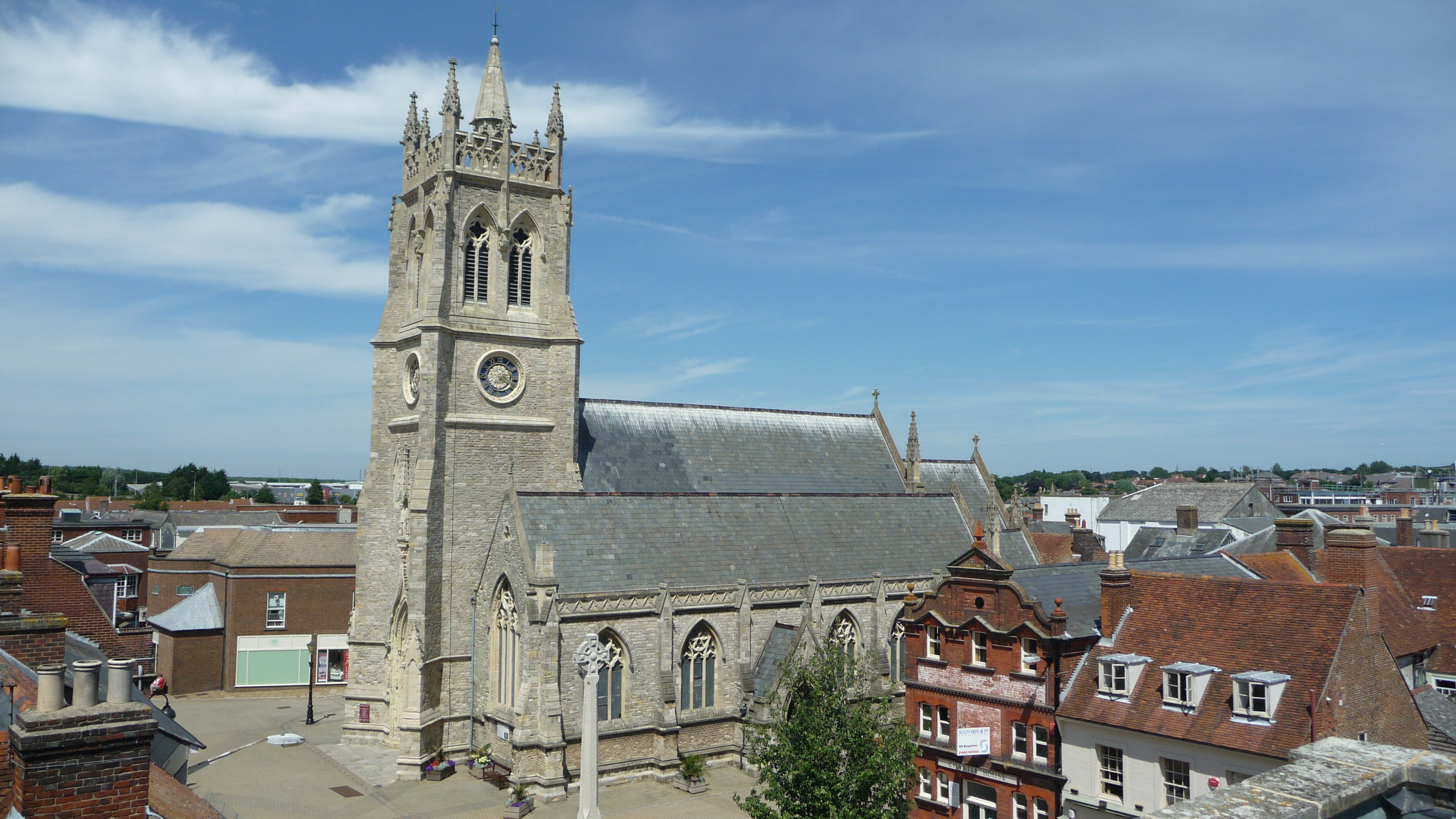
- Newport Minster (Isle of Wight)
- Newport Minster (Sts Thomas, Newport, Isle of Wight)
- Denomination: Church of England
- Churchmanship: Broad Church

History
- Dedication: Thomas the Apostle and St Thomas Becket

Administration
- Province: Canterbury
- Diocese: Portsmouth
- Archdeaconry: Isle of Wight
- Deanery: Isle of Wight
- Parish: Newport

Clergy
- Rector: Chris Bradish
- Vicar(s): Emma Cooksey and Steve Sutcliffe

Sts Thomas Minster, Newport Minster or The Minster Church of Sts Thomas, until 2008 Sts Thomas Church, is civically recognised as the main Anglican church on the Isle of Wight. Unusually, it is dedicated to both Thomas Becket and Thomas the Apostle.

== History ==
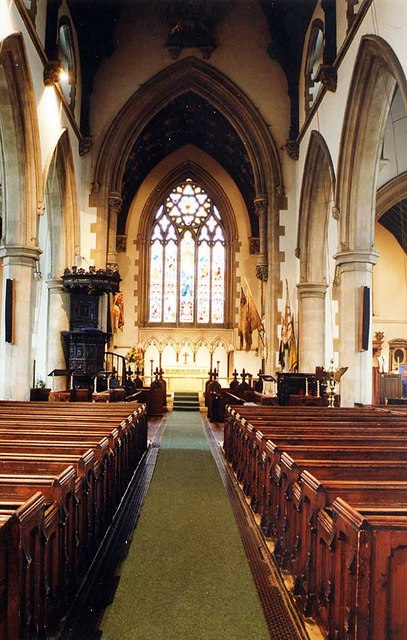
Interior of Newport Minster

The original late 12th-century church was dedicated to St Thomas of Canterbury (Thomas Becket) (1118–1170). Later, under the rule of King Henry VIII of England (1509–1547), when Becket was declared to have been a traitor, the Canterbury part of the name was dropped. Its name and the ambiguous dedication to St Thomas was thereafter, over time, assumed by many to refer to Thomas the Apostle.

From the 18th century its deterioration made any renovation futile, and funds were raised for a new church on its site. The new church was built over the years 1854 and 1855 to a design by the architect Samuel Daukes of Cheltenham. Reflecting the building's history, but arguably unusual, the new church was dedicated on the feast of Thomas the Apostle to both him and St Thomas of Canterbury. The tower contains a ring of 12 bells.

To honour its importance in Island and civic life, but conferring no official status within the Church of England itself, the church was designated as a Minster at Easter 2008 by its diocesan bishop Kenneth Stevenson, Anglican Bishop of Portsmouth.

== Burials ==
Burials from the late 16th century until 1858 took place in the detached grave yard situated between Orchard Street and Church Litten Lane. After local cemeteries opened in 1858, this grave yard became redundant. In the 1950's most of the memorials were removed and the old grave yard was repurposed as Litten Park.

Burials within the church itself are:

- Princess Elizabeth of England, daughter of Charles I and Henrietta Maria. A memorial was given by Queen Victoria in 1856 and made by Carlo Marochetti.
- Sir Edward Horsey 1582

== Organ ==
The organ is an architectural pipe organ positioned in the west gallery.

The original organ was built in 1870 by Forster and Andrews, and replaced by in 1925 by Conacher Sheffield & Co Ltd which was rebuilt itself in 1957 by J.W. Walker incorporating some pipework retained from the original Forster & Andrews organ.
