= List of former places of worship on the Isle of Wight =

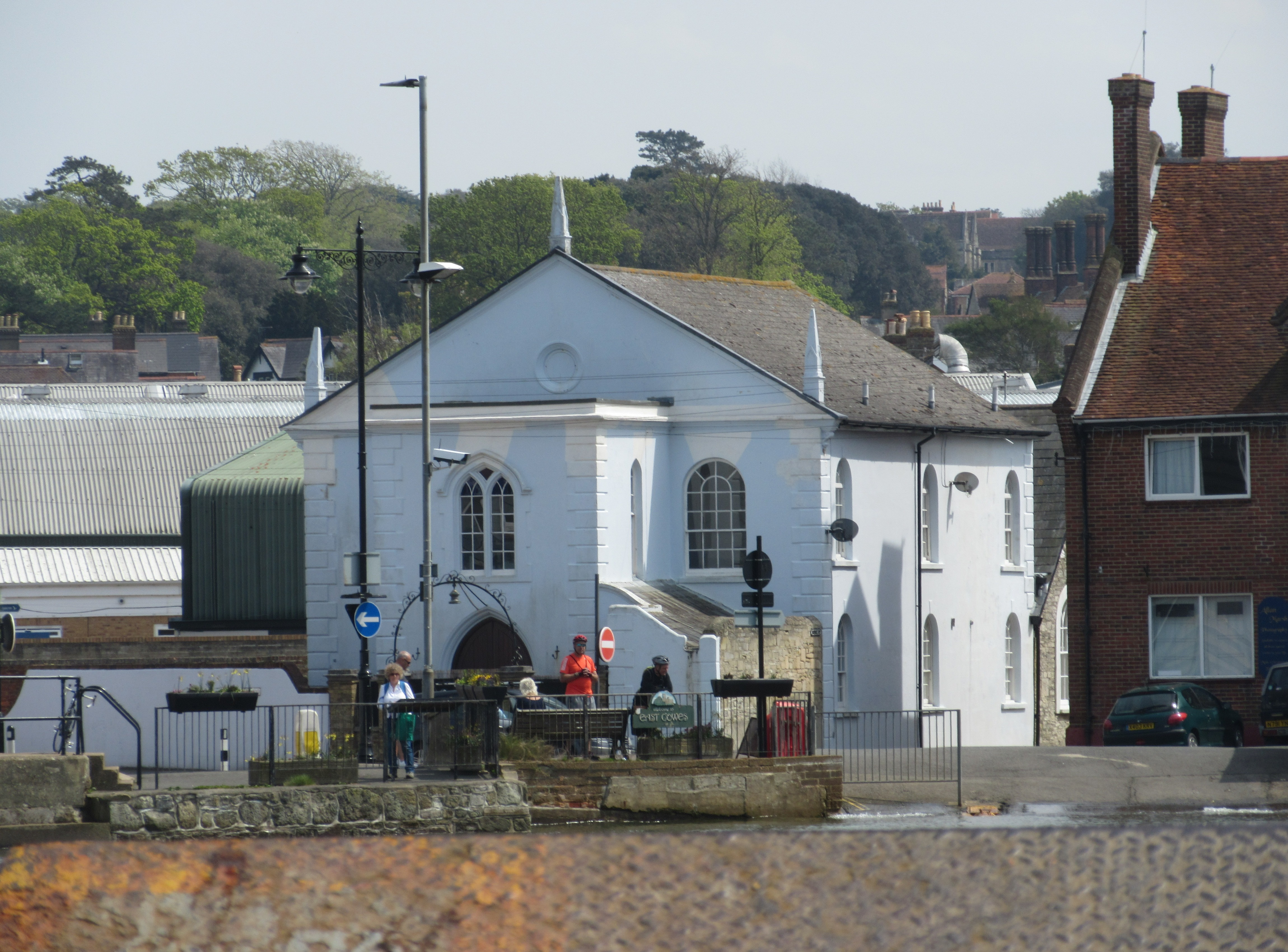
This Grade II-listed chapel in East Cowes served Congregationalists between 1829 and the 1980s.

As of 2020 there are more than 80 former places of worship on the Isle of Wight, England's largest island. The diamond-shaped, 146-square-mile (380 km^{2}) island, which lies in the English Channel and is separated from the county of Hampshire by The Solent, has a population of around 140,000 spread across several small towns and dozens of villages. Many former churches and chapels survive in alternative uses in the ancient ports of Yarmouth and Newport, the Victorian seaside resorts of Ryde, Sandown, Shanklin and Ventnor, and the twin towns of Cowes and East Cowes; and in villages and hamlets across the island, Anglican parish churches and mission churches and Nonconformist chapels have fallen of use and have been converted into houses, holiday cottages, village halls and similar.

Fifteen former churches and chapels have been awarded listed status by Historic England or its predecessor organisations in recognition of their architectural and historical interest. These include the ancient former churches in the villages of Bonchurch and St Lawrence, the ruined churches in St Helens and Thorley, former Methodist chapels in the towns of Cowes, Newport and Yarmouth, and an 18th-century malt house which briefly served as Niton's first Baptist chapel. A building is defined as "listed" when it is placed on a statutory register of buildings of "special architectural or historic interest" in accordance with the Planning (Listed Buildings and Conservation Areas) Act 1990. The Department for Digital, Culture, Media and Sport, a Government department, is responsible for listing; Historic England, a non-departmental public body, acts as an agency of the department to administer the process and advise the department on relevant issues. There are three grades of listing status. Grade I, the highest, is defined as being of "exceptional interest"; Grade II* is used for "particularly important buildings of more than special interest"; and Grade II, the lowest, is used for buildings of "special interest". As of February 2001, there were 26 Grade I-listed buildings, 55 with Grade II* status and 1,823 Grade II-listed buildings on the Isle of Wight. A further six former churches, including four tin tabernacles, have locally listed status: they are considered by the Isle of Wight Council to be "locally important [in] contributing to the character and sense of place on the Island". Such buildings must meet at least two of the following criteria: historic interest; architectural, artistic and design merit; survival; townscape merit; and archaeological interest.

== Listed status ==
Grade	Criteria
Grade I	Buildings of exceptional interest, sometimes considered to be internationally important.
Grade II*	Particularly important buildings of more than special interest.
Grade II	Buildings of national importance and special interest.
Locally listed (L)	Buildings not on the national list but considered by the Isle of Wight Council to be "locally important [in] contributing to the character and sense of place on the Island". (Note: Such buildings must meet at least two of the following criteria: historic interest; architectural, artistic and design merit; survival; townscape merit; and archaeological interest.)

== Former places of worship ==
Former places of worship
Name	Image	Location	Denomination/ Affiliation	Grade	Notes	Refs
Apse Heath Methodist Chapel (More images)		Apse Heath; 50.6468°N 1.2012°W	Methodist	–	This church in the parish of Newchurch was established in 1875 for Wesleyan Methodists, and a new 120-capacity building of stone and brick was built in 1903. It was registered for marriages in 1910 and was closed for worship in 2013, although its registration was not formally cancelled until January 2022.	
St Matthew's Mission Church (More images)		Ashey; 50.6984°N 1.1714°W	Anglican	–	Ashey was within the parish of Newchurch and then Ryde until it was separated in 1894. This brick-built chapel of ease opened in 1878 to serve the hamlet; it was always part of the parish of All Saints' Church, Ryde. It closed in the 1950s and its marriage licence was annulled in November 1956.	
Bembridge Wesleyan Chapel (More images)		Bembridge; 50.6918°N 1.0911°W	Methodist	–	Built as a Wesleyan Methodist chapel in 1844, this was registered for marriages only in 1922 and was superseded by a new Methodist church elsewhere in the village in 1934. At that time it was purchased by the Catholic Church and converted into a chapel of ease (St Michael's Chapel) within the parish of Ryde. A new church was built in 1965 and the chapel closed and was later deconsecrated, after which it was converted into a house.	
Christ Church (Blackgang Mission) (More images)		Blackgang; 50.5948°N 1.3168°W	Baptist	L	Described in 1912 as an "undenominational mission hall near the church" (St Andrew's parish church in Chale), sources vary as to its opening date: Isle of Wight Council states it was opened by missionary C. Reade in 1908, but The London Gazette gives a date of July 1900 for the registration of Blackgang Mission Hall on this site. It had in turn replaced a mission hall dated 1888. The tin tabernacle became associated with the Baptist denomination and closed at an unknown date, after which it was converted into a holiday cottage.	
St Barnabas' Church (More images)		Blackwater; 50.6751°N 1.2835°W	Anglican	L	This tin tabernacle was erected in the late 19th century as a chapel of ease in the parish of St George's Church, Arreton. It was later extended in brick, but closed in the late 20th century and has been incorporated into the premises of a business which sells fruit and vegetables.	
Wesleyan Methodist Church (More images)		Blackwater; 50.6736°N 1.2850°W	Methodist	L	Sources vary on whether this small (80-capacity) rendered brick chapel was built in 1834 or 1843. It was registered for worship by Wesleyans in February 1854; the building was sold in 1940 or 1941 and its registration was cancelled in February 1941. The windows in the side elevation are Gothic-style lancets and are set in recesses; the front has no windows and has a gabled porch. The former chapel is disused and was described as in "poor condition" in 2011.	
Old St Boniface Church (More images)		Bonchurch; 50.5991°N 1.1849°W	Anglican	II*	The foundation of this church may pre-date the Domesday Survey of 1086, but the present building is mostly Norman in style and age. The nave and chancel are separated by a simple arch which was rebuilt by Percy Stone during his interwar restoration of the church. Remains of 12th-century wall paintings are visible. Bonchurch began to develop as a high-class village from the late 1830s, and a new church with the same dedication was completed in 1848 and superseded this church. The dedication to Saint Boniface is rare in a church of this age in England. (Note: Although Saint Boniface is best known for helping to Christianise Germany, he was trained at the Benedictine monastery at Nursling near present-day Southampton.)	
Bowcombe Methodist Church (More images)		Bowcombe; 50.6847°N 1.3252°W	Methodist	–	The 120-capacity chapel dates from 1908, but a tin tabernacle served the community of Bible Christians here from 1882 until that date. A registration for marriages was granted in May 1954. The chapel closed after its final service on 2 June 2019 and was formally deregistered in January 2022.	
Brading United Reformed Church (More images)		Brading; 50.6756°N 1.1449°W	United Reformed Church	–	Congregationalists in the Brading area first formed a church in 1832, and this chapel opened 15 years later and was registered for marriages in 1867. Its first minister, Rev. Samuel Burrows, is commemorated with a memorial in the burial ground, which survives despite the building's residential conversion. The steep site means the chapel was built with a basement floor. The four-bay side elevation is demarcated by buttresses of the same stone rubble material as the rest of the chapel. The façade is steeply gabled, and all windows are lancets.	
Beulah Methodist Chapel (More images)		Brighstone; 50.6463°N 1.4064°W	Methodist	–	Although registered for marriages only in November 1970, the brick- and slate-built chapel was built in 1836 (a datestone is still visible on the façade) and opened the following year for Bible Christian Methodists. Flanking the arched doorway are two tall, narrow arched windows. The building had a capacity of 110, and was used until 2000 when the present Brighstone Methodist Church replaced it, after which it passed into residential use.	
Calbourne Methodist Chapel (More images)		Calbourne; 50.6809°N 1.4000°W	Methodist	–	Land was bought in July 1883 for this brick-built Wesleyan chapel, which opened the following year at a cost of £795 and with a capacity of 150. Its heyday was between the 1910s and the 1940s, when the congregation grew rapidly and two Sunday services were held. By the time of its closure, though, there were only three surviving members. It closed in 1986, its marriage registration (granted in September 1896) was cancelled in July of that year, and it was sold in 1987 for £30,000 for residential conversion.	
Carisbrooke Methodist Chapel (More images)		Carisbrooke; 50.6915°N 1.3181°W	Methodist	–	This brick-built church, registered as Methodist Jubilee Chapel, held 120 worshippers and was erected in the late 19th century. It closed in the 1980s; like the chapel at Calbourne, it was deregistered in 1986 and has become a house.	
Chale Methodist Chapel (More images)		Chale Green; 50.6096°N 1.3196°W	Methodist	L	Wesleyan Methodism came to Chale in 1815 and the first church (a 185-capacity building) opened then. It was replaced in 1888 by this stone chapel capable of holding 132 worshippers. "Appearing more like a small parish church" than a Nonconformist chapel owing to its prominent, high position and intricate Gothic Revival detailing (including a lancet-windowed gabled façade flanked by turrets), it remained in use into the early 21st century, but had closed and been converted into a house by 2011. Its marriage registration dated from November 1903 and was formally cancelled in January 2022.	
North End Bible Christian Chapel (More images)		Chale Green; 50.6189°N 1.3195°W	Methodist	–	The Bible Christian community in Chale parish formed itself into a church in 1840, and the first chapel in this part of Chale parish was built two years later. The present brick building dates from 1884 and held 120 people, 10 more than its predecessor; after its closure it was converted into a house.	
Methodist Church (More images)		Chillerton; 50.6543°N 1.3073°W	Methodist	–	Built of stone and brick in 1860 for Bible Christian Methodists, this chapel is now in residential use.	
Top Chapel (Reformed Methodist Chapel) (More images)		Chillerton; 50.6516°N 1.3126°W	Methodist	–	Chillerton's village hall was built in 1845 as the hamlet's first Methodist chapel. It remained in religious use for about a century.	
West Cowes Congregational Chapel		Cowes; 50.7627°N 1.3006°W	Evangelical Fellowship of Congregational Churches	–	Sun Hill Congregational Church was built in 1803 for a congregation founded in 1742. A Sunday school was built opposite in 1877, and this became the new church in 1971 when the old chapel had to be vacated because it was structurally unsound. It was sold for demolition and the site was redeveloped. The Congregational church merged with other denominations in 1972 to form the United Reformed Church, but some individual congregations stayed separate; this happened at Cowes, and after a period spent aligned with the Congregational Federation they later joined the EFCC—an association of independent churches which follow Congregationalist polity. The renamed church, which was registered for marriages in September 1975, later closed and was sold for conversion into flats.	
Wesleyan Methodist Chapel (More images)		Cowes; 50.7604°N 1.2965°W	Methodist	II	This was opened in 1831 for Wesleyan Methodists and could hold 820 worshippers, 550 seated. Although largely Neoclassical in style—with a projecting cornice and pediment, recessed roof, pilasters and a slightly projecting entrance bay—the segmental-arched windows are slightly Gothic in appearance. The materials are ashlar and Swanage stone, and there was a Sunday school building at the rear. A new church of brick was built diagonally opposite in 1901, at which point the marriage registration of the old chapel (granted in June 1858) was cancelled. It was sold to Samuel Saunders, a boatbuilder, who established his company in the building; this later became the Saunders-Roe company. Later it was used by an amateur dramatics society, as a dance hall, for public meetings and by a printing company; but since 1966 it has been a house. It has also been known as Alexandra Hall.	
West Hill Chapel (More images)		Cowes; 50.7601°N 1.2979°W	Methodist	–	The chapel was built in 1889 for Primitive Methodists on a road laid out at the same time. Of pale brick with arched and round windows flanked by pilasters and a tall projecting pedimented entrance porch also supported on pilasters, it has a "temple"-like appearance and also resembles the nearby Baptist church. Its registration was cancelled in July 1941; Isle of Wight Council bought the building for £1,500 in that year and spent a further £220 converting it to become the town's library. The following year a bomb landed directly outside but failed to explode. Although principally a standard public library, it also specialises in maritime books and incorporates a maritime museum.	
Free Wesleyan Methodist Chapel (More images)		Cowes; 50.7606°N 1.2989°W	Methodist	–	The chapel dates from the 1830s but was registered for use by Free Wesleyan Methodists only in May 1868. The building has been extended substantially since it went out of religious use; the original chapel section has a three-bay façade which projects in the centre and has full-length pilasters flanking the pointed-arched windows. The materials are brick and slate. It was also used as a church school during the week until a new school was built in 1907. By the early 20th century it was converted into a theatre and cinema; from about 1935 it was used as a coach station; during World War II the Auxiliary Fire Service took it over as a fire station; it was then in educational use again briefly after the war; and since 1967 it has been occupied by a rigging shop and factory.	
Salvation Army Citadel (More images)		Cowes; 50.7610°N 1.2991°W	Salvation Army	–	The foundation stones of this citadel were laid on 8 June 1908 and the building opened for worship in that year. It was registered for marriages between March 1948 and September 2002; by 2004 it was in a derelict condition, but after some alterations it has become a commercial office.	
East Cowes Congregational Church (More images)		East Cowes; 50.7573°N 1.2899°W	Congregational	II	Attempts were made to establish a Congregational chapel in East Cowes in 1820, but there was opposition to this and the efforts failed. Nine years later, however, five members of Sun Hill Congregational Church in Cowes were successful in their attempt: a 400-capacity chapel (an "odd mixture" of Gothic Revival and Neoclassical architecture, with round-arched windows and a prominent pediment) was built on the bank of the River Medina in 1829. It was registered for marriages between March 1859 and October 1984, when it closed for conversion into holiday apartments. The "careful" conservation work undertaken for this won a local award in 1990.	
St James's Mission Hall (More images)		East Cowes; 50.7557°N 1.2879°W	Anglican	L	This was known to be in use by 1894 as a mission chapel from St James's Church in the town centre, serving new housing development in the area. Situated on a prominent street corner, the yellow-brick building features intricate details in terracotta and stucco and retains its original leaded-light windows. It was stated in 2012 that Isle of Wight Council owned the building but were attempting to sell it.	
Salvation Army Hall (More images)		Freshwater; 50.6816°N 1.5252°W	Salvation Army	–	This hall was in use by the Salvation Army in 1912. After it fell out of religious use it became a workshop, but in 2012 a planning application seeking residential conversion stated it was empty and "ha[d] not been used for several years".	
Freshwater United Reformed Church (More images)		Freshwater; 50.6741°N 1.5167°W	United Reformed Church	–	The chapel was founded as a Congregational church in the late 19th century. Its marriage registration dates from May 1902. Following the consolidation of the island's United Reformed congregations in 2014, it closed on 31 December 2021.	
Hale Common Wesleyan Chapel (More images)		Hale Common; 50.6582°N 1.2268°W	Methodist	–	The chapel opened in 1837 and was in use until 1900, when a new Wesleyan church (the Dairyman's Daughter Memorial Chapel—now demolished) opened on the opposite side of the road. The old building, which could hold 100 worshippers, is now used as a storage facility.	
Haven Street Methodist Chapel (More images)		Havenstreet; 50.7111°N 1.2068°W	Methodist	–	The original chapel, a 130-capacity brick building with tall windows flanking an arched entrance and with a small window and oculus above, stood to the left of the Sunday school building, to which it was attached by a small porch. It closed and was demolished in 1958, and the Sunday school building was converted into a church. It was used until the 1990s, but its marriage registration was cancelled in May 1994 and the building is now a house. (Note: The former chapel stood in the foreground of the photograph, behind the stone wall. The single-storey gabled stone section perpendicular to the main building was the connecting porch.)	
Hillway Mission Hall (More images)		Hillway, Bembridge; 50.6770°N 1.0958°W	Open Brethren	–	Registered as a Gospel Mission Hall between September 1895 and June 1971, this building (now in residential use) was reregistered under this name later in 1971.	
St James' Church (More images)		Kingston; 50.6294°N 1.3244°W	Anglican	II*	The church served its tiny rural parish (population c. 70 in 1912) from the 13th century until 1985, when it closed and was converted for residential use. A simple aisleless chapel with an undivided nave and chancel and a bell-cot on the gable end, it was altered in the 15th century and in 1872; R.J. Jones was responsible for the Victorian restoration. The church was declared redundant with effect from 1 August 1985.	
Locks Green Mission Room (More images)		Locksgreen, Porchfield; 50.7160°N 1.3721°W	Anglican	–	This remote hamlet was in the Anglican parish of Newtown, distant from its parish church (the Church of the Holy Spirit). When a Church of England-sponsored National School was built in 1867, it was furnished and consecrated to allow it to be used for divine service as well. It served the Locks Green and Porchfield areas, but these were hotbeds of Protestant Nonconformism and its use as a church ceased around 1900. It was temporarily used again in the early 1920s while Newtown church was undergoing repairs.	
Mark's Corner Methodist Chapel (More images)		Mark's Corner, Northwood; 50.7256°N 1.3380°W	Methodist	–	This 100-capacity, brick-built chapel in the hamlet of Mark's Corner, near the village of Northwood historically in the parish of Calbourne, was built in 1890 for Primitive Methodists to replace a chapel of July 1833. In 1851, when the minister at West Cowes was in charge, this was described as a 30-by-16-foot (9.1 m × 4.9 m) building with standing room for 100. The chapel was deregistered in 1986 and is now a house.	
Merstone Methodist Church (More images)		Merstone; 50.6633°N 1.2568°W	Methodist	–	The chapel opened in 1848 for Wesleyan Methodists, although it was not registered for marriages until June 1977. It was converted into a house after its closure in 2006. The slate-roofed brick building, which has lancet windows and a gabled porch, could hold 100 worshippers. Some original fittings, including the pulpit and octagonal font, survived until closure.	
Bethesda Primitive Methodist Chapel (More images)		Newbridge; 50.6861°N 1.4183°W	Methodist	–	The chapel could hold 108 people when it opened in 1847, and it was extended 16 years later. Closure came in the mid-20th century and the building is now in residential use.	
First Church of Christ, Scientist, Newport		Newport; 50.7010°N 1.2981°W	Christian Scientist	–	This opened in 1968, superseding premises elsewhere in the town which had been registered the year before, but it has been converted into a bed and breakfast establishment.	
Node Hill Congregational Chapel (More images)		Newport; 50.6980°N 1.2954°W	Congregational	–	The name Node Hill is derived from Noddy's Hill, where victims of a 14th-century battle were buried (Noddy is a word for dead body). Seceders from Newport Congregational Chapel founded this church in 1803; the 40-by-29-foot (12.2 m × 8.8 m) galleried chapel was extended in 1828, the 1840s and 1866, but the two churches reunited in 1881 and the brick and slate building was sold to become a lecture hall. It was later converted into a shop and was still in commercial use in the 1990s, but is now empty. It retains its painted three-bay façade and round-arched windows. It was registered for marriages (under its original name Lecture Hall) between 1838 and 1964.	
Newport old Congregational Church (More images)		Newport; 50.7002°N 1.2957°W	Congregational	–	Rev. Robert Tutchin, expelled from Newport parish church during the Great Ejection of 1662, founded an Independent chapel in the town, possibly as early as that year and certainly by 1694. A building erected c. 1699 was replaced in 1777. Thomas Binney, the "Archbishop of Nonconformity", was briefly a minister during this time. A new chapel (pictured) was built on a site nearby in 1848 and extended in 1877. Members of nearby Node Hill Chapel joined in 1881. The church elected not to join the United Reformed Church at the union of 1972, preferring to stay independent. In 2000 an adjacent nightclub offered to buy the building to expand into; the church sold and vacated it, moving to a new building on nearby Pyle Street. The chapel, a pale rubble Gothic Revival building by Francis Pouget, is now a Wetherspoons pub.	
Victoria Methodist Church (More images)		Newport; 50.6998°N 1.2925°W	Methodist	II*	This Classical-style chapel of plum-coloured brick, with an "uncommonly fine" Doric-columned symmetrical three-bay façade and prominent pediment, opened in 1804 and was extended in 1830 or 1833. A similarly high-quality interior, galleried and with a balustraded apse, has mostly been lost since the chapel's closure in 1970 and conversion into a theatre. With a capacity of 500 it was the larger of two former Wesleyan chapels in the town (the other, at Hunnyhill, is no longer extant).	
Zion Bible Christian Chapel (More images)		Newport; 50.7013°N 1.2924°W	Methodist	–	This Bible Christian chapel on Quay Street dates from 1843–44 and was superseded by Frederick Mew's much larger Gothic Revival chapel a short distance away in 1879–80. It is in commercial use as an office.	
Ebenezer Chapel		Newport; 50.7015°N 1.2941°W	Methodist	–	Newport's first Primitive Methodist chapel opened in 1836 on Holyrood Street and served the denomination for half a century until its successor (now the Salvation Army hall) was built on Pyle Street nearby. After briefly being used by the Catholic Apostolic Church, it was sold and, with significant alteration, integrated into a shop building.	
Friends Meeting House		Newport; 50.7015°N 1.2972°W	Quaker	–	Quakers in Newport met at these premises on Crocker Street (registered in October 1956) before moving to their present site.	
Holyrood Hall (More images)		Newport; 50.6992°N 1.2977°W	Quaker; Plymouth Brethren	II	A Quaker meeting house stood on the site from 1694, but it was demolished in 1804 and the site fell out of religious use until this rendered Gothic Revival building was erected c. 1860. Quakers used it until about 1922, when it became the town's Plymouth Brethren meeting hall: it is believed to have superseded an earlier building on Holyrood Street which was registered with the name Assembly Rooms between August 1907 and November 1923, and was itself registered in June 1928. Later it was acquired by St Thomas of Canterbury Catholic Church and became their church hall, which it remains—although for a short time between the sale of their old chapel and the opening of their new building, Newport Congregational Church used it for their services. The entrance, recessed under segmental arch, is flanked by two tall Gothic-arched windows. The slate-tiled roof has a gable end.	
Baptist Chapel (More images)		Niton; 50.5880°N 1.2846°W	Baptist	II	The building dates from the 1760s and has had four uses over the years, only one of them religious: initially a malt house, it was bought by Newport's Strict Baptist pastor and became Niton's first Baptist chapel for 25 years from 1823 until their new chapel was built nearby. After a period of use as a school, it served the village as a working men's club between 1913 and 1936; since then it has been Niton Village Hall. A single-storey stone building with a five-window range, it retains its original sash windows.	
St Joseph's Church (More images)		Niton; 50.5883°N 1.2837°W	Roman Catholic	–	A Catholic chapel in a building next to a house in the village (registered between 1964 and 1971) was succeeded in 1969 by this converted building, a chapel of ease to the Catholic church at Ventnor. It was still in use in 1987 but closed later in the 20th century.	
Northwood Methodist Chapel (More images)		Northwood; 50.7396°N 1.3271°W	Methodist	–	Wesleyan Methodism reached Northwood village in 1820, and the present brick-built 150-capacity chapel and schoolroom replaced the original building in 1890. It closed in 1998 and is now a house.	
St Andrew's Chapel (More images)		Norton Green; 50.6951°N 1.5216°W	Anglican	–	This served as both an Anglican chapel of ease in the parish of All Saints Church at Freshwater and a garrison chapel for soldiers at nearby Golden Hill Fort. The building was in religious use between 1906 and 1981, after which it was converted into a house.	
Parkhurst Methodist Chapel (More images)		Parkhurst; 50.7211°N 1.3047°W	Methodist	–	The Wesleyan chapel was built of brick in 1872, replacing a building of 1836 on a nearby site, and catered for up to 135 worshippers. It was registered for marriages in March 1923. After its decline and closure c. 1995 the building became derelict, but has since been converted with minimal external alteration into a house.	
Bethesda Chapel (More images)		Porchfield; 50.7141°N 1.3625°W	Methodist	–	A brick-built Bible Christian (later United Methodist) chapel capable of accommodating 120 people, this served the remote village between 1852 and its closure on 24 March 1991—although the building's present appearance dates from 1902, when a Sunday school was also added. The site was bought in 1840. The chapel's choir was well-regarded on the island and once performed at The Crystal Palace in London.	
St John's Church (More images)		Rookley; 50.6562°N 1.2841°W	Anglican	L	This tin tabernacle was used between the late 19th century and the 1960s as an Anglican chapel of ease in the parish of St George's Church, Arreton. It is "a plainer model than others with a west facing porch". The premises are now in commercial use.	
Roud Baptist Chapel (More images)		Roud; 50.6200°N 1.2725°W	Baptist	–	Baptists in this rural part of Godshill parish were served by a chapel from 1831, replaced by this brick-built building with Gothic-arched windows in 1859. Not formally registered for marriages until May 1958, this certification was cancelled in February 1980 and the chapel closed; it is now a house.	
Holy Trinity Church (More images)		Ryde; 50.7281°N 1.1578°W	Anglican	II	The 134-foot-8-inch (41.05 m) spire, "a masterpiece" with a "specially distinctive outline", is still a landmark across the north of the island and from Portsmouth, but Thomas Hellyer's "imposing" church of 1844–46 closed for worship in 2014 and is now a community centre. It was Ryde's first parish church: the parish was the first to be formed out of Newchurch's vast area. An extension was built in 1860, and there is a war memorial chapel dedicated to St Martin.	
St Thomas's Church (More images)		Ryde; 50.7306°N 1.1632°W	Anglican	II	A "simple and rural" chapel was founded in 1719 by Thomas Player in what was then a rural area in the parish of Newchurch. James Sanderson's Gothic Revival limestone and yellow-brick replacement church, funded by Player's grandson, was constructed in 1827–28. The castellated tower, which is recessed slightly behind the gabled aisles flanking it, lost its spire in 1951. A gallery survives inside, as does the 18th-century churchyard surrounding the building. The church closed in 1959 and was declared redundant with effect from 1 August 1977. After a period of dilapidation it was restored and converted into a public hall. It never had its own parish: initially a chapel of ease to Newchurch, it was later in the parish of All Saints Church, Ryde.	
Haylands Congregational Chapel (More images)		Ryde; 50.7175°N 1.1748°W	Congregational	–	The chapel was founded and built for Congregationalists in 1850 and was registered for marriages between January 1946 and December 1974; its cancellation coincided with that of George Street chapel in Ryde town centre and the opening of the new Ryde United Reformed Church.	
Kingdom Hall (More images)		Ryde; 50.7255°N 1.1570°W	Jehovah's Witnesses	–	Rooms in a building on the High Street were used for worship by Jehovah's Witnesses between 1961 and 1966, when the congregation moved to a building which had been known as Daniel Street Mission Hall until 1964. It was used until October 1984 when a much larger building (also now closed) replaced it on a different site, after which the Daniel Street premises became a house.	
Kingdom Hall (More images)		Ryde; 50.7107°N 1.1446°W	Jehovah's Witnesses	–	This Kingdom Hall on Brading Road was registered for marriages in October 1984 in place of the premises at Daniel Street which had been used for the previous 18 years. The congregation moved to the Newport Kingdom Hall c. 2018 and the building was sold to become a veterinary surgery; its marriage registration was cancelled in May 2019.	
Wesleyan Methodist Chapel (More images)		Ryde; 50.7306°N 1.1596°W	Methodist	–	The building opened at the start of 1844 for Wesleyan Methodists and was registered for marriages in February 1860, but in 1883 it was superseded by a new, larger chapel (still extant) in Garfield Road. Its marriage registration was cancelled in August of that year, and it has been converted into flats. The walls are of stone and white-painted ashlar. The symmetrical façade has very tall, thin, round-arched windows and a flat projecting porch with similar windows and blank arches. Above this, the central window is in a slightly recessed section with an arch above it. The side elevations have similar windows.	
Newport Street Chapel (More images)		Ryde; 50.7273°N 1.1650°W	Methodist	–	The chapel was originally Bible Christian and later United Methodist. It was sold in the 1940s, and its marriage registration (granted in May 1875) was annulled in May 1945. The building has now been incorporated into Greenmount Primary School.	
Primitive Methodist Chapel (More images)		Ryde; 50.7247°N 1.1643°W	Methodist	–	This chapel opened in 1901 and was registered the following April. In 1942 the congregation moved to the church at Garfield Road, and the 400-capacity brick building was deregistered in May 1948 and was sold to become a youth club.	
Abingdon Road Meeting Room (More images)		Ryde; 50.7245°N 1.1590°W	Plymouth Brethren	–	Now a house, this building was recorded as a meeting room of Exclusive Brethren between the 1930s and the 1950s.	
Old St Helen's Church (More images)		St Helens; 50.7015°N 1.0993°W	Anglican	II	The old parish church stood next to the sea and was falling down by the 16th century; a new church on an inland site replaced it in 1717, after which the ruins were allowed to decay further. The tower was retained, though, and was cut in half diagonally in the 18th century, leaving it "oddly triangular". The cut-off section facing the sea was reinforced with a taller brick wall and was painted white to make it a sea mark. The other surviving walls are of limestone and retain a 13th-century door and lancet openings. An open-air service is held next to the remains every year on Sea Sunday.	
Wesleyan Methodist Chapel (More images)		St Helens; 50.6974°N 1.1103°W	Methodist	–	This chapel is on Lower Green Road on the south side of the village green; there was another near Upper Green Road, (Note: At 50.698290, -1.110786.) now the site of two semi-detached houses. The Lower Green chapel was used by Wesleyans and could trace its origins to 1811, but the cause declined in the 1950s and it was sold during that decade. Funding from a benefactor enabled it to be converted into a youth club, but this has closed and the building is disused.	
Old St Lawrence's Church (More images)		St Lawrence; 50.5871°N 1.2438°W	Anglican	II*	George Gilbert Scott's much larger church of 1878 a short distance away replaced this simple 13th-century chapel, which was a single room until 1842 when the chancel was built. Many alterations have taken place over the centuries, most recently in 1927 by Percy Stone. A bell next to the 19th-century porch was recovered from the old Appuldurcombe Priory.	
Sandford Methodist Church (More images)		Sandford; 50.6338°N 1.2290°W	Methodist	–	In 1911 this was recorded as a United Methodist chapel. It was registered for marriages in October 1927 and was capable of holding 150 worshippers. A foundation stone (image) records the architect as E.J. Harvey. After a long-term decline in the congregation, the stone-built chapel closed in 2015 and was proposed for residential conversion.	
Broad Lane Chapel (More images)		Sandown; 50.6561°N 1.1583°W	Methodist	–	The chapel was registered in 1856 and was used by Primitive Methodists. It has been converted into flats.	
Wesleyan Methodist Chapel (More images)		Sandown; 50.6565°N 1.1571°W	Methodist	–	William Willmer Pocock designed Sandown's former Wesleyan chapel in 1865–66. It has walls of rough stonework and a gabled front flanked by pinnacles. The 325-capacity chapel was registered between August 1874 and April 1956, after which it was converted into a storeroom for furniture.	
Sandown United Reformed Church (More images)		Sandown; 50.6558°N 1.1579°W	United Reformed Church	–	Also of rough stone with stone dressings, Sandown's Congregational (latterly United Reformed) chapel dates from 1872–73 and was designed by Thomas Elworthy, a prolific architect in the Hastings area of East Sussex. With its gabled Gothic Revival façade and thin corner tower with a tall, spindly steeple, it is "quite a landmark". Since its closure in about 1980 (the year its marriage registration, granted in August 1874, was cancelled) it has been a snooker hall.	
Seaview Wesleyan Chapel (More images)		Seaview; 50.7217°N 1.1108°W	Methodist	–	Seaview's first Methodist chapel was built in 1845 at the start of a period of rapid growth in Seaview, when it was becoming established as a seaside resort. It closed in 1902 when the larger brick-built church on Ryde Road superseded it, and in the first half of the 20th century the firm of V.A. Warren and Sons Boatbuilders was established in the building. Boats are still built on the premises.	
Seaview Methodist Church (More images)		Seaview; 50.7203°N 1.1146°W	Methodist	–	This brick church had a capacity of 160 and was built in 1902 to replace the smaller 1845 chapel nearby. It was registered for marriages between December 1904 and November 1974. Since its closure it has been converted into a house.	
Holy Cross Church (More images)		Seaview; 50.7207°N 1.1112°W	Roman Catholic	–	Mass was first celebrated at a chapel in the Seaview home of Helen Gladstone, sister of William Ewart Gladstone, in the 1850s. Other temporary venues were used until this church was formally founded as a chapel of ease in the Catholic parish of Ryde. It opened in 1956, although it was not formally registered for worship until April 1964. Designed by local architect C.A.F. Sheppard in a "modest 1950s" style, it is a brick-built hall with a gabled façade featuring a recessed doorway and a tall window. The church closed in 2010, and a monthly Mass is now held at St Peter's Anglican church.	
Shalfleet Methodist Church (More images)		Shalfleet; 50.7013°N 1.4130°W	Methodist	–	The chapel opened in 1861 for Wesleyans, but had closed by 1980 when its registration was cancelled. The brick-built chapel has been converted into a house. There was also a Bible Christian chapel in the parish, used until 1936.	
Kingdom Hall (More images)		Shanklin; 50.6389°N 1.1729°W	Jehovah's Witnesses	–	This building was registered for Jehovah's Witnesses between March 1964 and June 1991, when it was superseded by the new Kingdom Hall at nearby Lake.	
Zion Bible Christian Chapel (More images)		Shanklin; 50.6274°N 1.1805°W	Methodist	–	Now in secular use as Shanklin Voluntary Youth and Community Centre, Shanklin's Bible Christian chapel opened in 1885 and was registered for marriages in April the following year. Closure came in the 1940s and it was deregistered in May 1945.	
Old St Swithun's Church (More images)		Thorley; 50.7007°N 1.4815°W	Anglican	II*	Most of the medieval church was demolished in 1871 when the new church of the same dedication was built nearer the centre of population. What remains is a two-storey porch-cum-belfry, originally on the south face of the building. The 13th-century window in the north wall was retrieved from the ruins and reset here. The structure, which sits in a large churchyard with many table-tombs, now serves as a mortuary chapel.	
The Avenue Methodist Church (More images)		Totland; 50.6840°N 1.5364°W	Methodist	–	The new Freshwater Methodist Church in neighbouring Freshwater was built in 2014 to replace this chapel after it "became unusable". The 260-capacity stone-and-brick chapel opened in 1904 for Bible Christians and was registered five years later. Formal closure came in 2012 and the building was converted into flats.	
Weston Manor Chapel (More images)		Totland; 50.6737°N 1.5396°W	Roman Catholic	II*	The Ward family, formerly of Northwood House in Cowes, established a new seat at Weston Manor in Freshwater parish in 1869. The family were Catholics, and the new manor house was designed by George Goldie—an architect who specialised in Catholic churches. Attached to the house was a chapel for their own use, but it was also made available for public worship with effect from 14 September 1871. Totland became a separate civil parish, formed from part of Freshwater's territory, in 1894. The Gothic Revival-style chapel, with an apse and large lancet windows, was reordered in 1898, three years after Peter Paul Pugin had designed an "elaborate" rood screen. A legacy from a family member who died in 1915 allowed a new church solely for public use to be built elsewhere in the village; St Saviour's was completed in 1923, after which Weston Manor Chapel went out of use. The whole building is now a bed and breakfast establishment.	
Bethesda Chapel (More images)		Ventnor; 50.5953°N 1.2019°W	Methodist	–	The Bible Christian Church's origins in Ventnor can be traced back to 1842, but this chapel was built in 1881 and was registered for marriages between November 1883 (as Victoria Street Chapel) and July 1964, after which it was converted into a youth club. It is a stone building and could seat 255 worshippers.	
Ventnor United Church (More images)		Ventnor; 50.5962°N 1.2007°W	Methodist/United Reformed Church	–	The chapel was registered for Wesleyan Methodists in December 1868, eight years after it opened. Worshippers from the 1836 Congregational (formerly Independent) chapel further along the High Street (now demolished) joined, and the church was reconstituted along united Methodist and United Reformed lines. Closure came in the early 21st century, the building was sold, and the congregation moved into the parish room of Our Lady and St Wilfrid Catholic Church.	
Alpine Road Evangelical Chapel (More images)		Ventnor; 50.5950°N 1.2087°W	Open Brethren	–	Formerly a church hall, this building was registered by an Open Brethren congregation for worship in May 1976 and for marriages 14 months later. In 2006 it was converted into a house.	
Ventnor Town Mission (More images)		Ventnor; 50.5949°N 1.1998°W	Quaker	–	This was recorded as a mission hall in 1912. It is now a house.	
United Methodist Church (More images)		Whitwell; 50.6002°N 1.2654°W	Methodist	–	Whitwell's United Methodist (formerly Bible Christian) chapel, now a house, is brick-built and could accommodate 200 worshippers. Although not registered for marriages until August 1931, it opened in 1884 (replacing a building of 1840 called Ebenezer Chapel) and was still in use until the late 20th century.	
Free Wesleyan Methodist Chapel (More images)		Wootton; 50.7252°N 1.2270°W	Methodist	II	This opened for religious worship in the early 19th century and was very close to the Wesleyan chapel to the west. It was one of several Nonconformist chapels in Wootton at the time. The façade of the building (which was later used by the St John Ambulance and is now a house) is of three bays with square-headed windows and a gable. The painted walls are of brick, and the roof is laid with slate tiles. The attached chapel caretaker's cottage is similar in appearance. It was known still to be in religious use in 1888.	
Wootton Methodist Chapel (More images)		Wootton; 50.7252°N 1.2276°W	Methodist	–	The chapel was built for Wesleyan Methodists in 1840 and was registered for worship the following March. It has a distinctive three-bay dressed stone frontage "of quite elegant proportions" with the slate roof hidden behind a parapet. There are arched windows, matched by similar arched recesses on the side walls. The capacity was 235 worshippers. The final service took place on 5 September 2004, the chapel's marriage registration (granted in December 1895) was cancelled in July 2007, and it was converted into flats. Worshippers joined the village's other Methodist chapel (originally Bible Christian) in Station Road.	
Primitive Methodist Church (More images)		Wroxall; 50.6173°N 1.2237°W	Methodist	–	Registered for marriages in April 1924 but dating from the late 19th century, this survived in religious use until the late 20th century but is now a house. It was built for Primitive Methodists and could hold 100 worshippers.	
Yarmouth Methodist Church (More images)		Yarmouth; 50.7053°N 1.4996°W	Methodist	II	Yarmouth's stone-built, Perpendicular Gothic Revival Wesleyan chapel dates from 1824 (although it was rebuilt in 1881, as shown on its date stone) and could accommodate 150 people. There is a spire-topped turret at the corner of the gabled façade and an "elaborate tripartite window" with tracery. The building, which is now a house, closed for religious worship in the late 20th century and the congregation moved into St James's Church, which became a joint Anglican and Methodist church.	
Bible Christian Chapel (More images)		Yarmouth; 50.7058°N 1.4980°W	Methodist	–	The chapel opened in 1869 to serve Bible Christian worshippers and was registered in November of that year. Following the union of 1907 it became a United Methodist Church. After its closure, which took place before 1940, it was converted into a builder's workshop, but it is now a house.	

== Bibliography ==
- Bacon, Dennis (2002). St Helens, Isle of Wight, Then & Now: 1952–2002. St Helens: St Helens Historical Society.
- Besley, Russell (1931). List of Meetings, July 1931 (PDF). Croydon: Russell Besley.
- Blanchard, Phillip (2001). Newport, Carisbrooke and Parkhurst. Images of England. Stroud: Tempus Publishing. ISBN 0-7524-2207-3.
- Cheverton, R.J.; Matthews, S.L. (n.d.). Memories of Old Seaview. Newport: Richards Printers.
- Diocese of Portsmouth (1987). Diocese of Portsmouth Yearbook 1987. Portsmouth: Portsmouth Diocesan Information Office.
- East Cowes Heritage (1994). Discovering East Cowes. Newport: Island Books. ISBN 1-898198-04-7.
- Ednay, Peter (1993). Newport in Times Past. Carisbrooke: Vectis Research. ISBN 1-897865-00-7.
- Foss, Keir (2006). The Book of Porchfield and Locks Green: Rural Retreat on the Isle of Wight. Tiverton: Halsgrove. ISBN 1-84114-502-5.
- Foss, Keir (2009). The Book of Calbourne: A Village at the Cross-roads. Tiverton: Halsgrove. ISBN 978-1-84114-922-6.
- Gosden, Hilary (2010). A History of the Wesleyan Methodist Chapel at Wootton Bridge. Wootton: Hilary Gosden.
- Groves, John (2004). Cowes: The Jewel of the Solent. Cowes: Rotary Club of Cowes.
- Hooper, Paul (2002). A History of Newport Congregational Church. Freshwater: West Island Group.
- I.O.W. Teachers' Centre (1976). Newport Town Trail. Newport: Isle of Wight County Council.
- Kelly, Bernard W. (1907). Historical Notes on English Catholic Missions (PDF). London: Kegan Paul, Trench, Trübner & Co.
- Lane, Marian (1994). Parish Churches of the Isle of Wight. Newport: South Wight Borough Council.
- Lloyd, David W.; Pevsner, Nikolaus (2006). The Isle of Wight. The Buildings of England. London: Yale University Press. ISBN 978-0-300-10733-3.
- Methodist Church of Great Britain (1947). Methodist Church Buildings: Statistical Returns including Seating Accommodation as at July 1st, 1940 (PDF). Manchester: The Department for Chapel Affairs. (Available online in 14 parts)
- Morton, Peggy (1992). Candle on a Hill: A History of Sun Hill Independent Congregational Church, Union Road, Cowes, Isle of Wight: 1742–1992. Cowes: Sun Hill Congregational Church.
- Nott, Patrick A. (2011). The Religious Society of Friends. The First 350 Years in Newport and the Isle of Wight: A History of Local Quakerism from 1657 (PDF). Patrick Nott. Archived from the original (PDF) on 29 June 2016.
- Parr, Donald A. (1994). Around Ryde in Old Photographs. Britain in Old Photographs. Stroud: Alan Sutton Publishing. ISBN 0-7509-0815-7.
- Ryde Social Heritage Group (2008). Ryde's Heritage: Our Town, Your Histories. Ryde: Ryde Social Heritage Group. ISBN 978-0-9558987-0-9.
- Stell, Christopher (1991). Inventory of Nonconformist Chapels and Meeting-Houses in South-West England. London: Royal Commission on the Historical Monuments of England. ISBN 0-117011-81-9.
- Trowbridge, W.H. (1953). List of Meetings 1953 (PDF). Kingston-upon-Thames: The Stow Hill Bible and Tract Depot.
- Trowbridge, W.H. (1956). List of Meetings 1956 (PDF). Hampton Wick: The Stow Hill Bible and Tract Depot.
- Vickers, John A., ed. (1993). The Religious Census of Hampshire 1851. Southampton: Hampshire County Council, Planning Department. ISBN 1-8735953-0-1.
- United Reformed Church (2022). Book of Reports 2022 (PDF). London: The United Reformed Church. Archived (PDF) from the original on 23 October 2022.
- Wheeler, Jack (1968). Towards Another Century: The Chronicle of Holy Trinity Church, Ryde, Isle of Wight. Ryde: Lightbowns.
- Winter, C.W.R. (1981). The Ancient Town of Yarmouth. Newport: The Isle of Wight County Press. ISBN 0-9501779-7-0.
