= Percy Stone =

English architect, author and archaeologist (1856–1934)

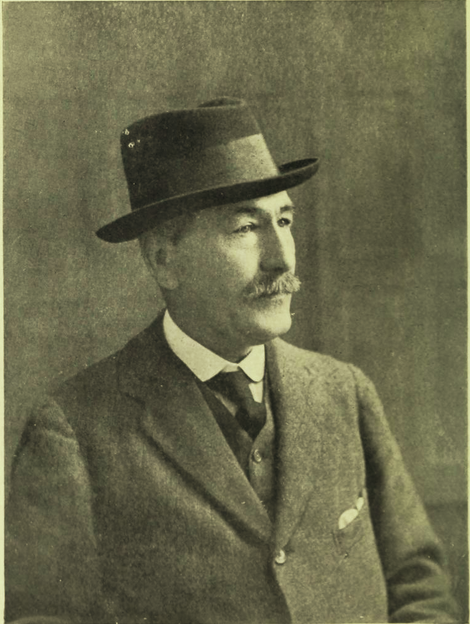
- Stone in Poets of the Wight c. 1922
- Born: Percy Goddard Stone; 15 March 1856; London
- Died: 21 March 1934 (aged 78); Merstone, Isle of Wight, United Kingdom
- Occupation: Architect
- Practice: English architect, author, and archaeologist
- Projects: Queen Victoria Memorial, Newport; Arreton War Memorial

Percy Goddard Stone fsa friba (15 March 1856 – 21 March 1934) was an English architect, author and archaeologist who worked extensively on the Isle of Wight, where he lived for most of his life. He designed and restored several churches on the island, designed war memorials and rebuilt Carisbrooke Castle. His "passion for archaeology" led him to excavate the ruins of Quarr Abbey, and as an author he wrote about the churches and antiquities of the Isle of Wight and contributed to the Victoria County History.

== Life ==
Stone was born in London on 15 March 1856 to Coutts and Mary Stone of Bayswater. His father was also an architect, and after leaving Rugby School Percy Stone qualified as an architect in his home city. He was articled to George Devey for three years from 1875, then served as an assistant in the office of William Emerson, who had married Stone's sister Jenny in 1872. Stone worked in London, joining his father's practice, until either 1884 or the 1890s, when he moved to the Isle of Wight. He lived at Merstone, a hamlet in the centre of the island, where he died on 21 March 1934.

Stone married Fanny Maria Belden Powys in 1879. The marriage produced five children and lasted until Fanny's death in 1898. He later married Amelia Frances Smith of Shanklin. He and two of his children are buried at Shanklin cemetery.

As soon as he moved to the Isle of Wight, Stone began to research its archaeological and architectural history. The Architectural Antiquities of the Isle of Wight from the XIth to the XVIIth centuries inclusive, published in 1891, remains "the definitive survey" of the subject and displayed his skill as a "meticulous draughtsman". He was later invited to write chapters pertaining to the Isle of Wight for the Victoria County History of Hampshire, a scholarly study of the county's ecclesiastical, topographical, architectural and social history, which was published in 1912. William Page, the series editor, acknowledged Stone's contribution specifically, thanking him for his "advice and assistance in all matters connected with the history of the Isle of Wight, a subject he has made so particularly his own". Stone also wrote a book about the village churches of the island.

== Works on the Isle of Wight ==
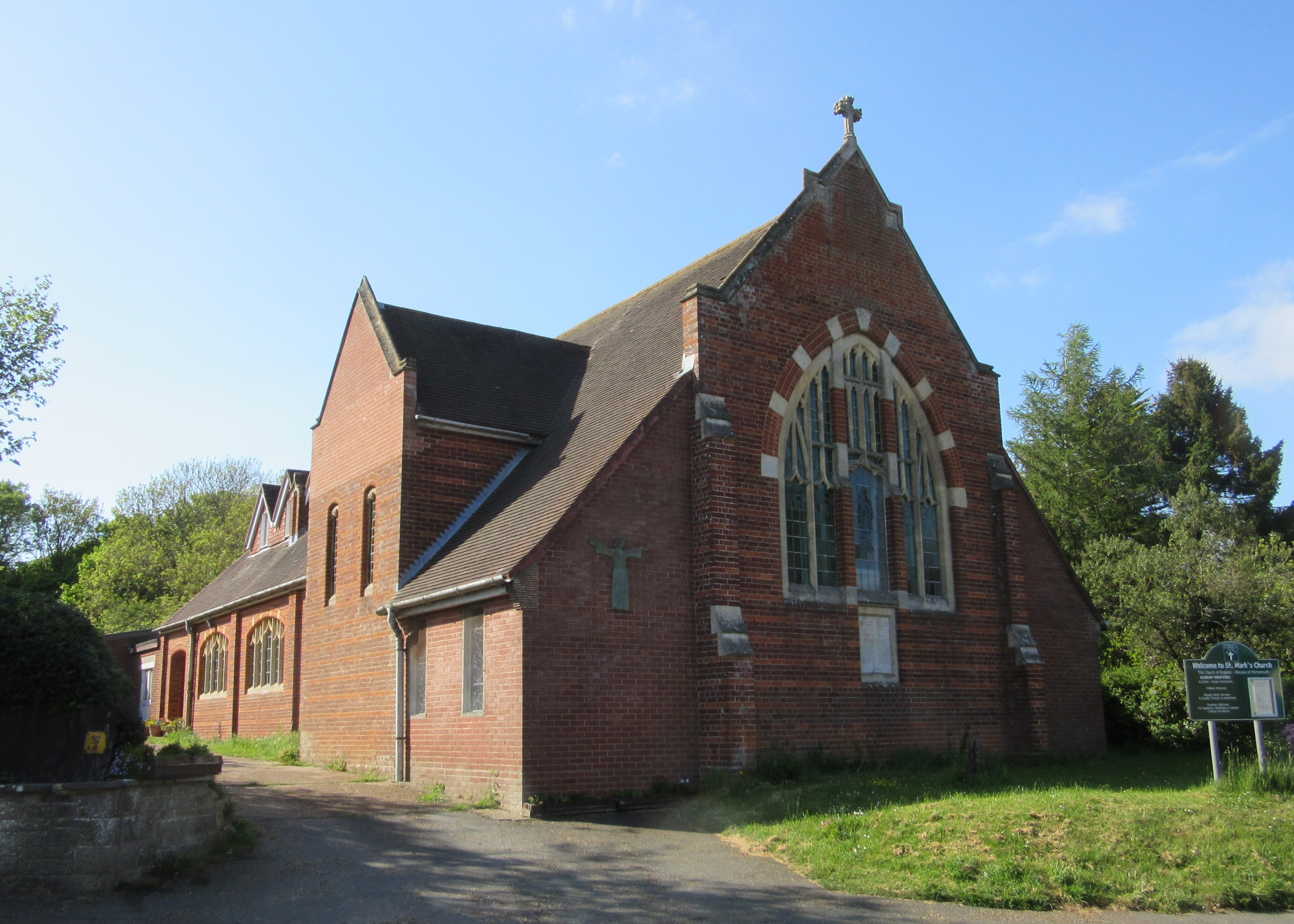
St Mark's Church, Wootton (1909)

Much of Stone's work on the Isle of Wight was done at Church of England churches. He restored the ancient churches at Bonchurch (Old St Boniface Church), in 1923 and again in 1931, and St Lawrence (St Lawrence Old Church) in 1927. At Christ Church in Totland he designed the south aisle (1905–06) and the chancel (1910). Stone's work on church furnishings on the island included a crucifix mounted on a beam in the chancel of St Peter's Church, Shorwell (1904), the west porch at St Paul's Church, Shanklin (1911), restoration of the pulpit at St Edmund's Church, Wootton (1912), a new pulpit at St George's Church, Arreton (1924), the reredos at St John the Baptist's Church, Niton (1930), and the rood screen at the Church of St Michael the Archangel, Shalfleet.

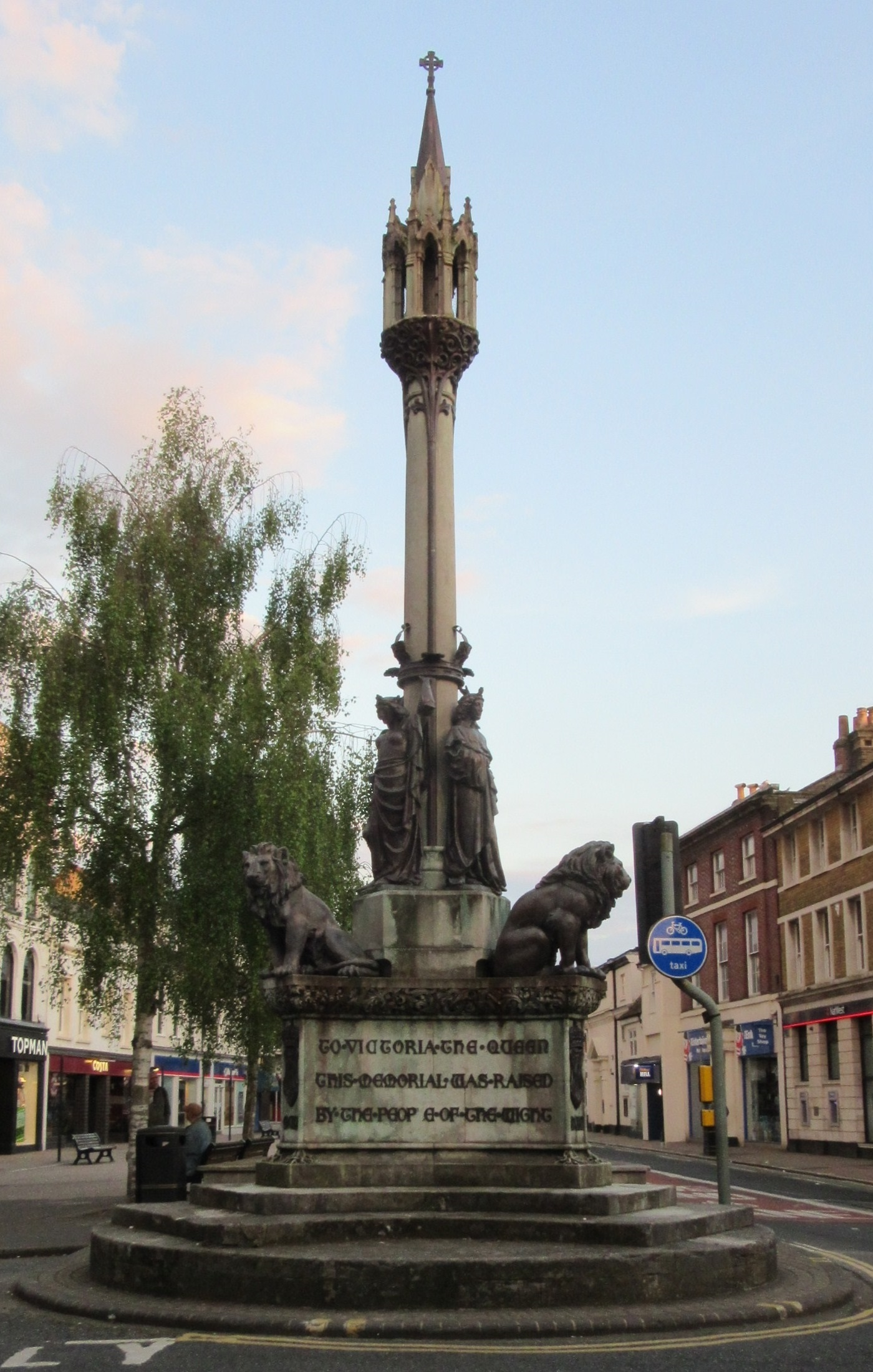
Queen Victoria Memorial, Newport, Isle of Wight (1901)

Stone designed war memorials in the churchyard of St George's Church, Arreton (1919), on the green outside Holy Trinity Church, Bembridge (c. 1920), in the churchyard of St Mildred's Church, Whippingham (1919), on Sandown Esplanade (1921), and in the churchyard of St Mary's Church, Brading (undated). The memorial at Arreton takes the form of a cross with a shield standing on a "slender octagonal shaft", while that at Brading has a tapering shaft and a gabled top. Bembridge's memorial, to which Korean War and Falklands War soldiers' names have been added, is Grade II-listed. The limestone and Portland stone structure cost £716 and is "a dignified and well-crafted example" of a memorial cross. Also listed at Grade II is Stone's Queen Victoria Memorial in the centre of Newport, the island's main town. Designed in 1901 and unveiled in 1903, just after her death at nearby Osborne House, it is "suitably elaborate" and "eclectic in its details"—featuring Gothic Revival and Art Nouveau elements. Around the base are three crouching lions cast in bronze, and above them are three angels also in bronze.

Stone designed a small extension at Nunwell House, an ancient manor house near Brading, in 1905–06. He also carried out several phases of work at Carisbrooke Castle: restoration of the gatehouse in 1898, reconstruction of the chapel of St Nicholas in Castro in 1905–06 and the refitting of the chapel's interior as the Isle of Wight County War Memorial in 1919.

Architectural historian Nikolaus Pevsner described Stone's work on the island as "sometimes mundane", but praised his only new-build church, St Mark's at Wootton Bridge (1910)—describing his use of brick-built internal piers to support the wooden roofs of the aisles as "inventive" and "striking". The church, built to serve the southern part of Wootton village (which was then in the parish of Arreton, distant from the parish church of St George), is a red-brick and stone Gothic Revival building with a nave and side aisles which lack arches. Stone was commissioned to design the church in 1908, but a lack of money resulted in several changes to the design and a delay in starting the work. His designs were approved by the Anglican Diocese of Portsmouth in November 1908 and were presented to the church committee in February 1909. Bishop James Macarthur laid the foundation stone two months later.

In 1914 Stone designed the Lych Gate at the entrance of St. Paul's civil cemetery, Barton, Newport on behalf of Mr. B. B. Beckingsale of Fairlee House in memory of his wife, Annie Catherine Beckingsale.

== Works elsewhere ==
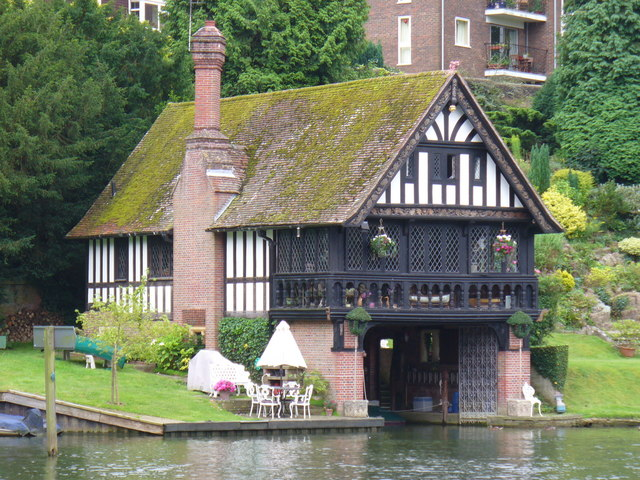
Boathouse at Goring-on-Thames (1894)

Between 1880 and 1883, Stone and his father designed Nether Court in Hendon, north London. Built in the Neo-Jacobean style as a private house for businessman Henry Tubbs, it had 15 bedrooms and was described in contemporary reports as "the largest Victorian house built in Hendon". It was illustrated in The Building News in June 1881. Tubbs lived there until his death in 1917, and since 1929 the building has been the clubhouse of Finchley Golf Club.

Also illustrated in The Building News was Nun's Acre, a large house in Goring-on-Thames, Oxfordshire, which Stone designed in 1886. The building featured round stained glass windows depicting three monkeys in the form of "a scientific professor", "a City gentleman" and "a bookmaker". It was acquired by the Civil Service Motoring Association and was later demolished and replaced by housing, although the extensive garden backing on to the River Thames remains. Stone's connection with the village continued for several years, possibly because of the long connection his first wife had with the area. He also designed a working men's club, a parish hall (now the Goring village hall) and, in 1894, a "handsome" boathouse next to the bridge over the Thames.

In 1888, in response to an international competition, Stone submitted a design for the proposed Soldiers' and Sailors' Monument in the city of Indianapolis. His design, named Acta non-Verba, was one of two chosen from the 70 submissions for final consideration; the judges stated "its merits were incontestable". The other finalist, a design by German architect Bruno Schmitz, was chosen as the winner, but Stone received a $500 prize for second place. Also in 1888, he drew up plans to rebuild Finnich Malise, a large Georgian-style house in Drymen in central Scotland, in the Gothic Revival style, but the work was not carried out.

In 1909, Stone was commissioned to design a lychgate at St Nicolas' Church, North Stoneham, Hampshire, to commemorate the wife of Bishop James Macarthur. He used timber taken from HMS Thunderer which took part in the Battle of Trafalgar.

== Bibliography ==
- Gazey, Doreen (2009). The History of St Mark's Church 1909–2009. Wootton: St Mark's Church, Wootton.
- Lloyd, David W.; Pevsner, Nikolaus (2006). The Isle of Wight. The Buildings of England. London: Yale University Press. ISBN 978-0-300-10733-3.
- Mann, John Edgar (2002). Book of the Stonehams. Tiverton: Halsgrove. ISBN 1-84114-213-1.
- Rose, Ernestine Bradford (1971). The Circle: The Center of Indianapolis. Indianapolis: Crippin Printing Corporation.
