= St Mark's Church, Wootton =

Church on the Isle of Wight, England

Coordinates: 50°43′24″N 01°14′19″W

St. Mark's Church, Wootton
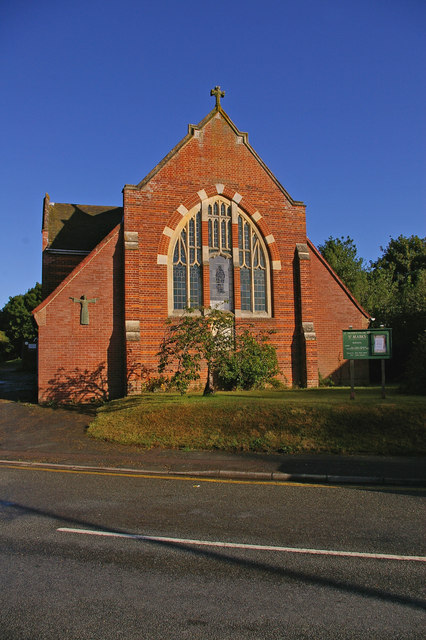
- St. Mark's Church, Wootton
- Denomination: Church of England
- Churchmanship: Broad Church
- Website: www.woottonparish.co.uk/stmarks.php

History
- Dedication: St. Mark

Administration
- Province: Canterbury
- Diocese: Portsmouth
- Parish: Wootton, Isle of Wight

Clergy
- Priest: Revd Kath Abbott

St. Mark's Church, Wootton is a church in the Church of England located in Wootton, Isle of Wight.

== History ==
The church dates from 1909 and was designed by architect Percy Stone.

The Bishop of Southampton James Macarthur laid the foundation stone. The builders were Messrs Jenkins who also built Quarr Abbey. On 29 August 1909 the building was dedicated.

The church was closed after damage during the Second World War. The building was disused until it was rededicated by John Henry Lawrence Phillips the Bishop of Portsmouth in 1970 at a time of rapid population growth in the parish.

== Parish Status ==
It is in the same parish as St. Edmund's Church, Wootton.

== Organ ==
A specification of the organ can be found on the National Pipe Organ Register.
