= Chale =

Village and civil parish on the Isle of Wight, England

Coordinates: 50.59652°N 1.31625°W

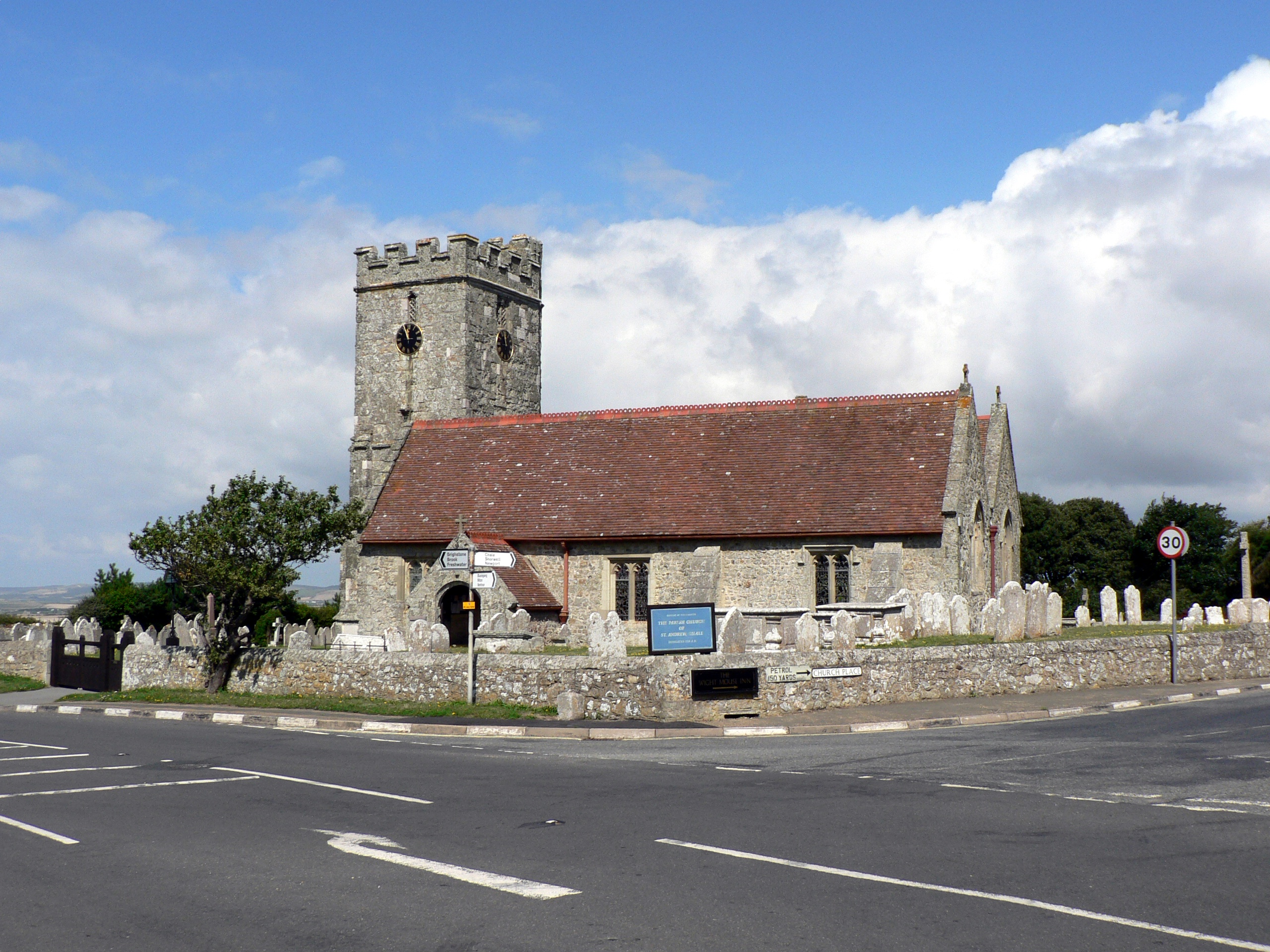
- St. Andrew's Church, Chale

- Location within the Isle of Wight
- Area: 8.9046 km^{2} (3.4381 sq mi)
- Population: 639 (2011)
  - Density: 72/km^{2} (190/sq mi)
- Civil parish: Chale
- Unitary authority: Isle of Wight
- Ceremonial county: Isle of Wight
- Region: South East
- Country: England
- Sovereign state: United Kingdom
- Post town: Ventnor
- Postcode district: PO38
- Dialling code: 01983
- Police: Hampshire and Isle of Wight
- Fire: Hampshire and Isle of Wight
- Ambulance: Isle of Wight
- UK Parliament: Isle of Wight West

Chale is a village and civil parish on the Isle of Wight of England, in the United Kingdom. It is located three kilometres from Niton in the south of the Island in the area known as the Back of the Wight. The village of Chale lies at the foot of St. Catherine's Down.

== History ==
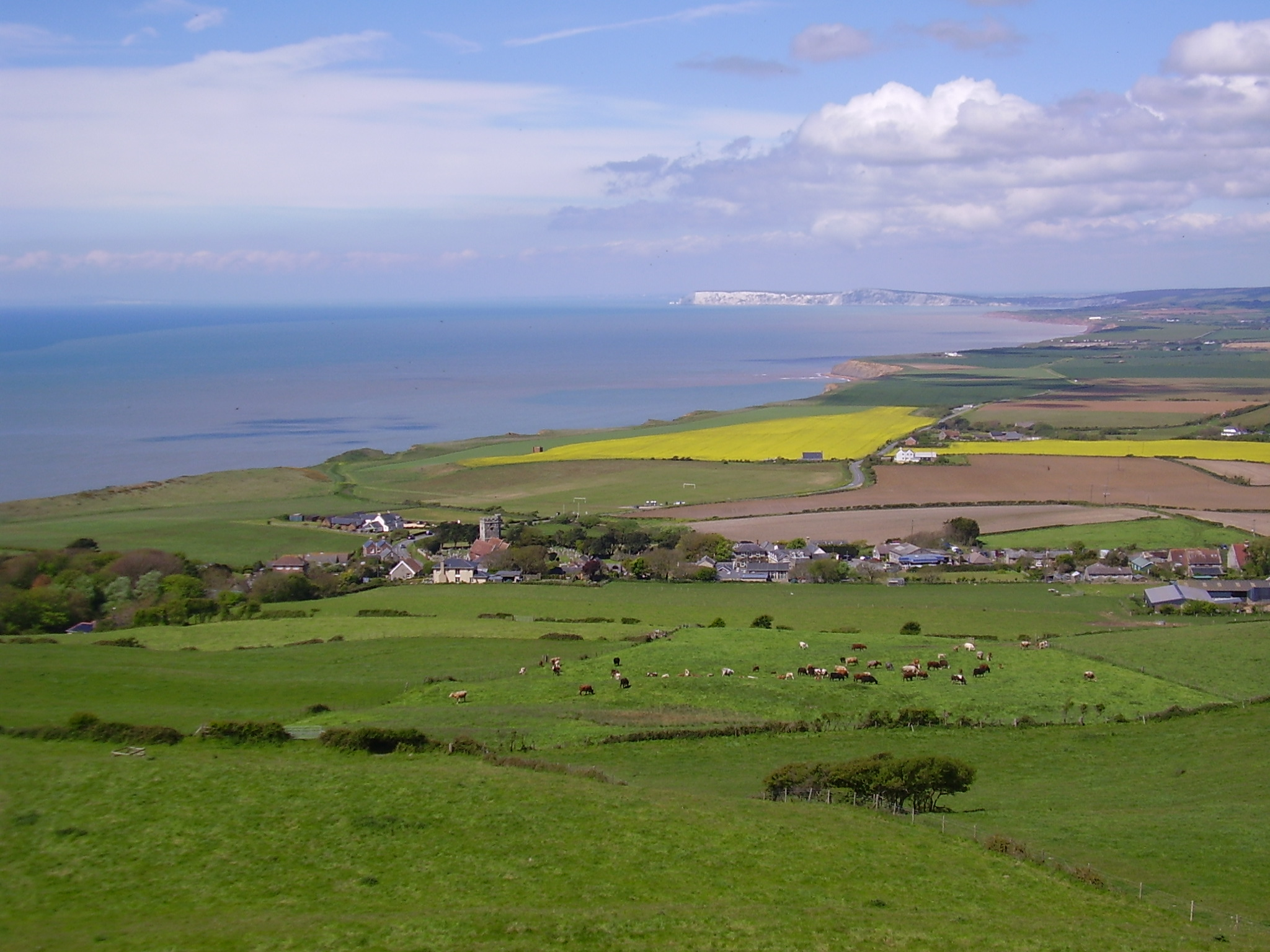
The village of Chale

Chale is recorded in the Domesday book as "Cela", which probably derives from the Old English word ceole, meaning "throat". This is thought to refer to the nearby chine at Blackgang. The name has been recorded as "Chale" since the 12th century.

1086 (Domesday Book): Cela

1114: Chale

1167: Chale

1181: Chele

~1290: Chele

There were three manors in Chale at the time of the Domesday Book: Chale, Gotten and Walpen.

The Parish Church of St Andrew was founded by Hugh Gendon in Chale in 1114. However, the present church dates from the 14th century. It has six bells in its tower. One might have been made about 1360. It has some fine stained glass windows.

The Chale Abbey farm has a window that dates from the 14th century. The name Abbey refers to the style of the building, not its religious use. Chale Abbey Farm and Walpen Manor are two of the oldest buildings on the Isle of Wight.

In 1456, John Goodyear, parson of Chale, donated an alabaster altarpiece depicting the main episodes in the life of the Apostle Saint James the Greater, to the Cathedral of Santiago de Compostela, Spain, where it is preserved today.

The south coast of the Isle of Wight has seen many shipwrecks because it has some famous rocky outcroppings. Lord William de Godeton removed some casks of wine from a French shipwreck in 1312. However, this wine was the property of the Church, which forced Godeton to build a tower and an octagonal oratory at the top of the cliffs above Chale on St. Catherine's Down. A fire was maintained in the oratory to prevent further shipwrecks. A monk remained resident in the oratory.

The Clarendon sank in Chale Bay in 1836, claiming 25 lives. The public was outraged, and demanded that a new lighthouse be built. Government officials who were in England and not familiar with local geography decreed that the new lighthouse should be on top of St. Catherine's Down. However, it is common for fogs to roll in and obscure the top of St. Catherine's Down, and there were more wrecks even after the new lighthouse was built. A second lighthouse, still in use, was built at the foot of the cliffs.

Chale is close to Blackgang Chine amusement park, which was opened in 1843 and was Britain's first theme park.

Peter Beazley, a politician and businessman, was born in Chale.

Chale had a school by 1784. The current school building dates from 1883, although it has been augmented by a newer hall, kitchens and a computer complex. It sits near the church and Wight Mouse Inn at the southern end of the parish. The school was the smallest on the Island, and one of the smallest in the United Kingdom with only 20 pupils on roll. This led to the threat of the school's closure, and it did close just before the summer vacation of 2010.

The Wight Mouse Inn and Clarendon Hotel is named after a shipwreck in 1835. Some of the timbers from the wreck are part of the building. It was a popular destination of the upper classes in an earlier era.

=== The Hermit of Chale and Chale Green ===
Isaac Sheath (1835-1912), otherwise known as The Hermit of Chale, was a disabled person living in the hamlet from 1835-1910. In the 1891 census, he was listed as 'an imbecile since birth', while in 1901 he was listed as 'feeble-minded'. His parents, William and Jane, had a lot of children, and living at Stroud Farm, where William worked as an agricultural labourer. He moved around until 1881, when they died. Isaac then lodged with the Creeth family, who took in lodgers to make money. He stayed for an uncertain amount of time, but in 1891 he was listed as 'living at Northgrounds Cottage and working as an agricultural labourer again. His "cottage" was a small wooden hut with a thatched roof on Appleford Road. Local people would give him old furniture, that he used for firewood. In the tourist season, coach tours would come to look at his house. He would pose for pictures, in return expecting payment. Local children would throw stones down his chimney and call him derogatory names. In 1910, his home was deemed 'unfit for habitation', and he was sent to a workhouse. He died in 1912, with The Isle of Wight County Press printing an obituary.

== Demography ==
The population of the civil parish was recorded as 620 at the 2021 Census, 639 at the 2011 Census, and 717 at the 2001 Census. It had a 0.3% decrease from 2011 to 2021.

In 2021, there were 312 (49.7%) males and 308 (50.3%) females in the civil parish.

Age Groups (2021)
Age Group	Number
0–17 years	80
18–64 years	302
65+ years	238

Age Distribution (2021)
Age	Male	Female	Total
0–9 years	16	28	44
10–19 years	25	14	39
20–29 years	19	17	36
30–39 years	26	22	48
40–49 years	23	30	53
50–59 years	49	47	96
60–69 years	64	60	124
70–79 years	58	66	124
80+ years	32	24	56

Country of Birth (2021)
Country	Number
United Kingdom	599
European Union	11
Europe (other)	2
Middle East and/or Asia	1
Africa	3
Other	4

Ethnic Group (2021)
Ethnic Group	Number
White	613
Black	1
Mixed/multiple	5
Other	1

Religion (2021)
Religion	Number
Christianity	307
Islam	1
Buddhism	2
Judaism	1
No religion	268

== Transport ==
Public transport is provided by Southern Vectis bus route 6, which runs between Newport and Ventnor. The summer-only Island Coaster service also stops in Chale.

== Governance ==
Chale is part of the electoral ward called Chale, Niton and Whitwell. At the 2011 Census the population of this ward was 2,721.

== See also ==
- St. Andrew's Church, Chale
- Blackgang Chine
- Chale Green
