= St Andrew's Church, Chale =

Coordinates: 50°35′46″N 01°19′08″W

St. Andrew's Church, Chale
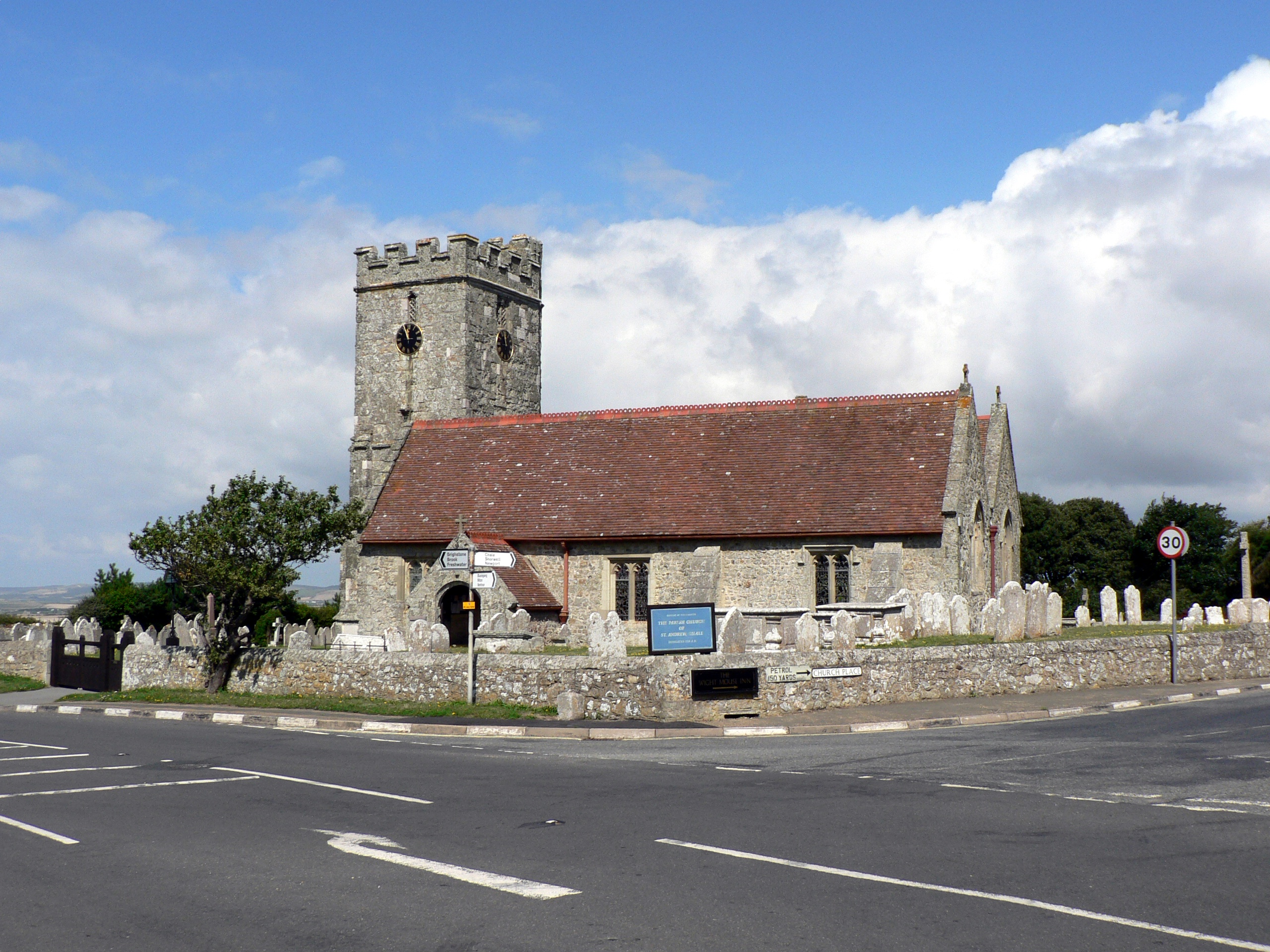
- St. Andrew's Church, Chale
- St. Andrew's Church, Chale
- Denomination: Church of England
- Churchmanship: Broad Church

History
- Dedication: St. Andrew

Administration
- Province: Canterbury
- Diocese: Portsmouth
- Parish: Chale

St. Andrew's Church, Chale is a parish church in the Church of England located in Chale, Isle of Wight.

== History ==
The church is medieval.

It was founded by Hugh Gendon in Chale in 1114. However, the present church dates from the 14th century. It has 6 bells in its tower. One might have been made about 1360. It has Christian images on some of the stained glass windows, mostly by Charles Eamer Kempe.

The churchyard contains Commonwealth war graves of a Royal Navy sailor of World War I and a Home Guardsman of World War II. Rumour has it that there was a tunnel leading from the church to the beach for smugglers to hide their merchandise, perfect foil. The doorway is still there today, only its filled in.

== Organ ==
The first organ in the church was installed around 1890, but was sold in 1900 to St. Peter's Church, Shorwell.

The church then acquired a two manual organ dating from 1899 by Bryceson. A specification of the organ can be found on the National Pipe Organ Register.
