= St Edmund's Church, Wootton =

Church on the Isle of Wight, England

St. Edmund's Church, Wootton
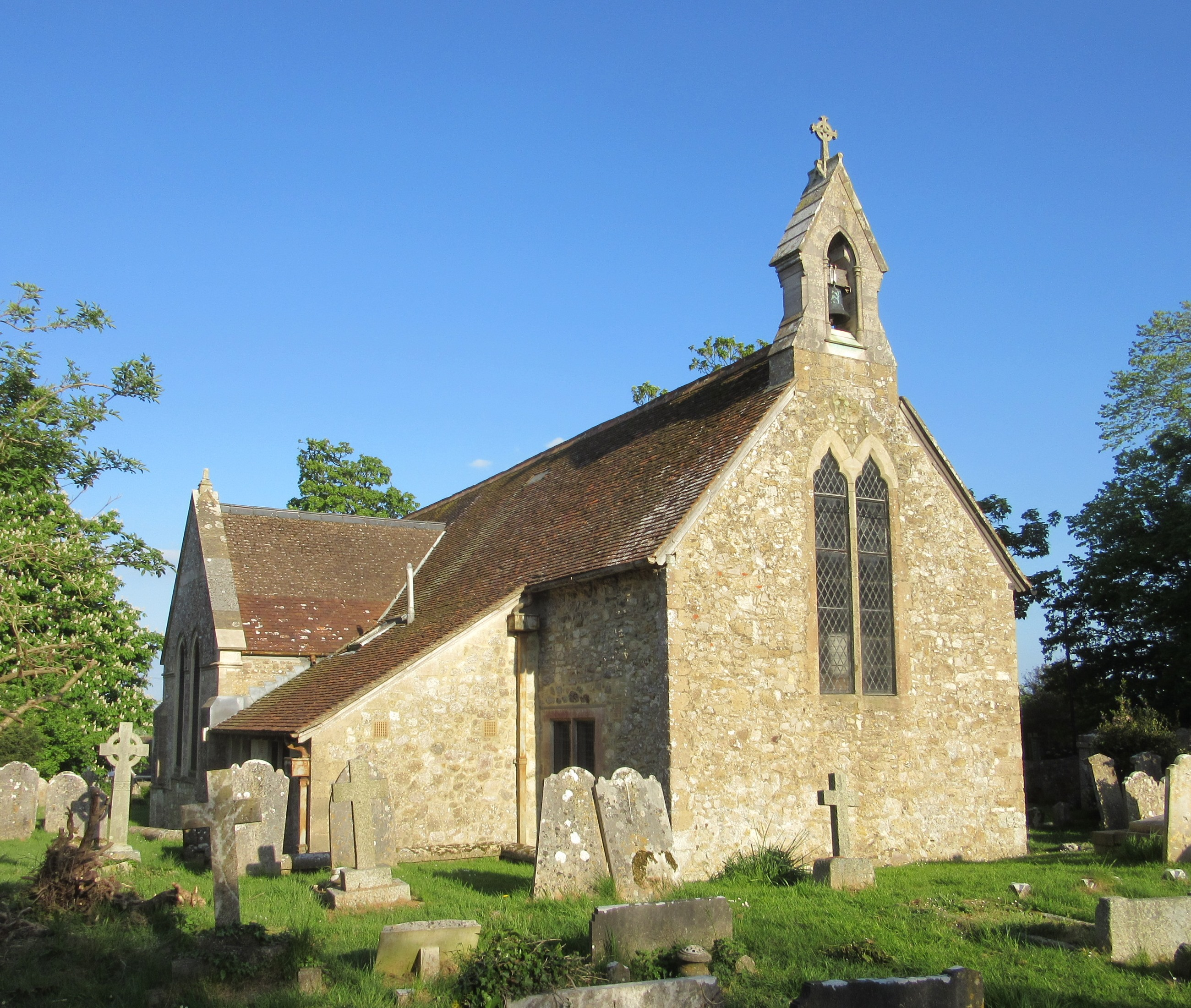
- St. Edmund's Church, Wootton
- 50°43′51″N 01°14′04″W
- Denomination: Church of England
- Churchmanship: Broad Church
- Website: cofeparishofwoottonbridge.org.uk

History
- Dedication: St. Edmund

Administration
- Province: Canterbury
- Diocese: Portsmouth
- Parish: Wootton, Isle of Wight

Clergy
- Priest: Revd Veronica Brown

Listed Building – Grade II*
- Official name: Church of St Edmund
- Designated: 1 October 1953
- Reference no.: 1229657

St. Edmund's Church, Wootton is a Grade II* Listed parish church in the Church of England located in Wootton, Isle of Wight. The church falls within the Diocese of Portsmouth.

== History ==
The church is medieval in origin.

It is now in the same parish as St. Mark's Church, Wootton, although the medieval parish only included a small part of what is now the larger settlement of Wootton Bridge. There was a detached portion of the parish at Chillerton.

St Edmund's Church became Grade II* Listed building on 1 October 1953.

The churchyard contains the Commonwealth war grave of a Hampshire Regiment soldier of World War I.

== Organ ==
The pipe organ dates from 1869 and was originally installed in St Andrew's Church, Norton Green, near Freshwater. It was moved here in the early 1980s when that church became redundant. A specification of the organ can be found on the National Pipe Organ Register.
