= Chale Green =

Hamlet in the United Kingdom

Coordinates: 50°37′08″N 1°19′11″W

- Hamlet
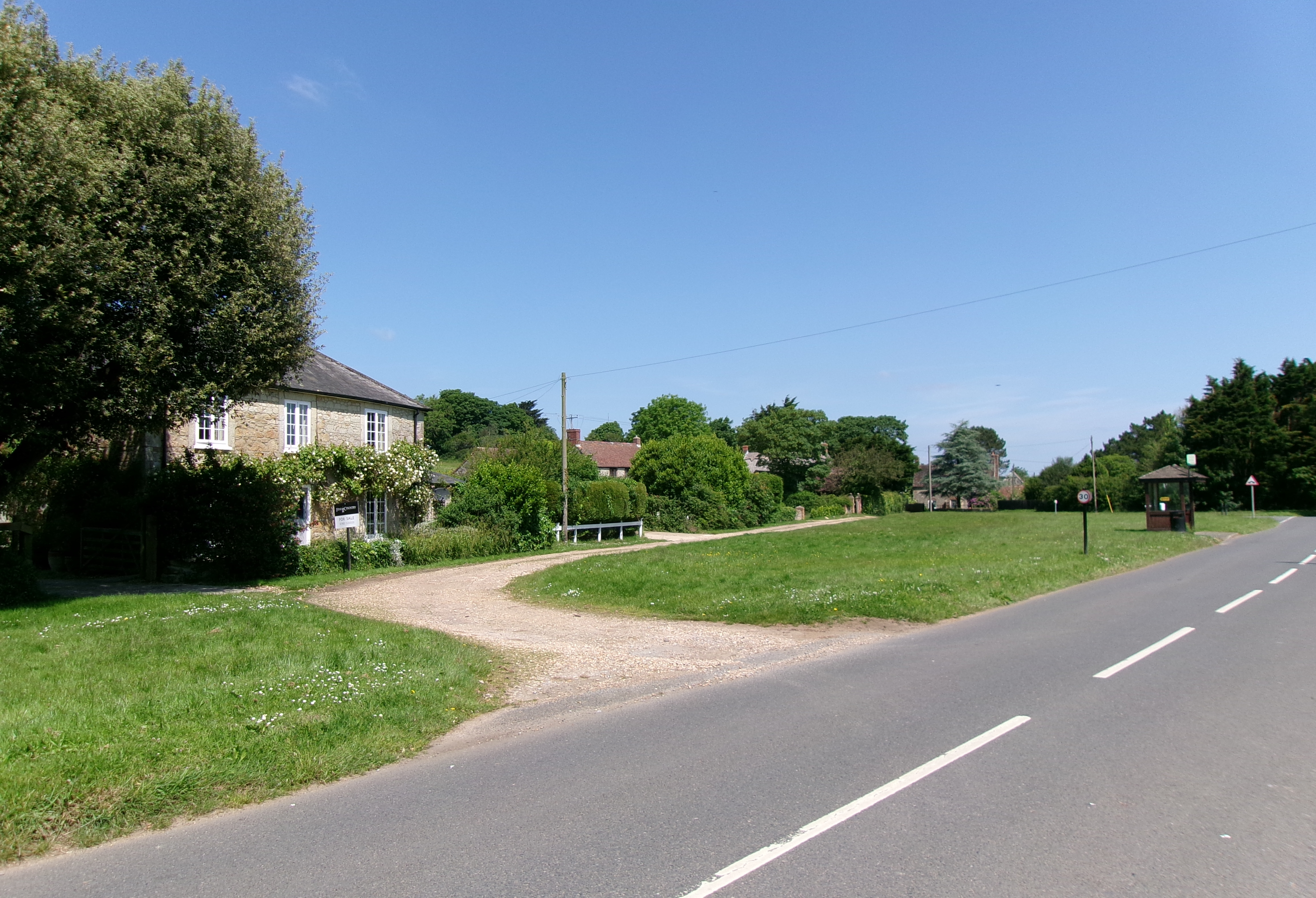
- The hamlet of Chale Green

- Location within the Isle of Wight
- OS grid reference: SZ4852179854
- Civil parish: Chale
- Unitary authority: Isle of Wight
- Ceremonial county: Isle of Wight
- Region: South East
- Country: England
- Sovereign state: United Kingdom
- Post town: VENTNOR
- Postcode district: PO
- Police: Hampshire and Isle of Wight
- Fire: Hampshire and Isle of Wight
- Ambulance: Isle of Wight

Chale Green is a hamlet on the B3399 road about a mile inland from the village of Chale on the Isle of Wight, England. Administratively it is part of the Chale civil parish.

== Name ==
The current name means '(the place at) the gorge or ravine', from Old English ceole, named after Chale. Ceole is referring to the once-400-feet-deep Blackgang Chine. An earlier name for the hamlet was Stroud Green, Stroud representing strōd, meaning 'marshy land overgrown with brushwood'.

== History ==
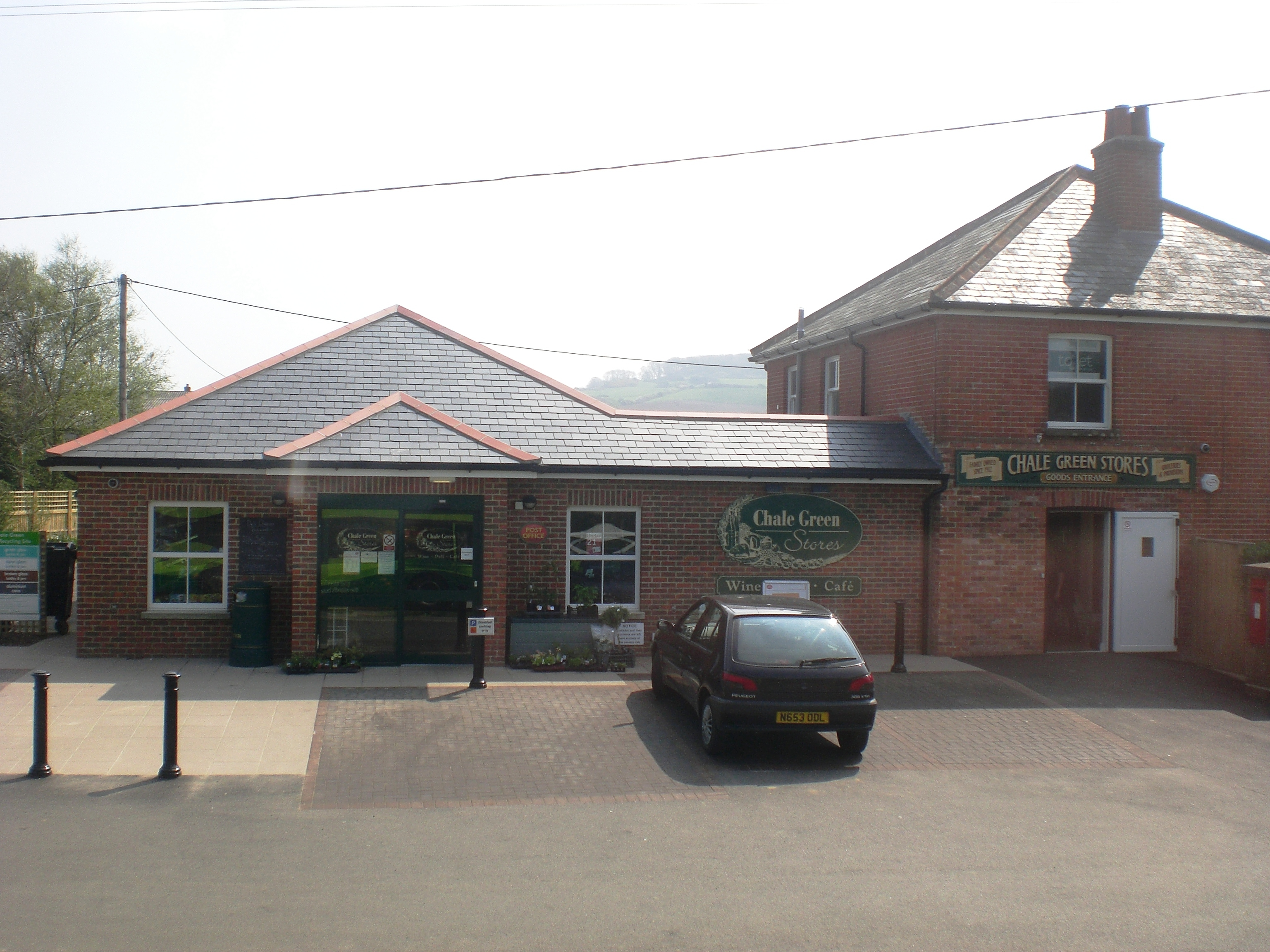
Chale Green Stores located opposite the village green.

By 1870, around Chale Green was a wheelwright, carpenter, chimney sweep business, The New Inn tavern, a blacksmith, a grocer and a shoemaker. Sprake's Brewery was founded in Chale Green in 1833. A sawpit existed in the early 20th century in Chale Green. The Star Pub in Chale Green recently closed.

Chale Green was part of Charles Seely's property in the 19th century.

The local Military Road was built for the Government by Mr. John Coker, contractor, of Romsey in the 1860s to bolster the defence of the coastal region. This was meant to allow the deployment of troops along the clifftops in case of an invasion. Before this the villages in the Back of the Wight were connected only by small roads reaching over the downs and through small gaps like Shorwell Shute.

Spanners Close, the largest residential development in the Chale area was built to the west of Chale Green in the late 1970s. It consists of 70 housing units.

=== The Hermit of Chale and Chale Green ===
Isaac Sheath (1835–1912), otherwise known as The Hermit of Chale, was a disabled person living in the hamlet from 1835–1910. In the 1891 census, he was listed as 'an imbecile since birth', while in 1901 he was listed as 'feeble-minded'. His parents, William and Jane, had a lot of children, and living at Stroud Farm, where William worked as an agricultural labourer. They moved around until 1881, when they died. Isaac then lodged with the Creeth family, who took in lodgers to make money. He stayed for an uncertain amount of time, but in 1891 he was listed as 'living at Northgrounds Cottage and working as an agricultural labourer again. His "cottage" was a small wooden hut with a thatched roof on Appleford Road. Local people would give him old furniture, that he used for firewood. In the tourist season, coach tours would come to look at his house. He would pose for pictures, in return expecting payment. Local children would throw stones down his chimney and call him names. In 1910, his home was deemed 'unfit for habitation', and he was sent to a workhouse. He died in 1912, with The Isle of Wight County Press printing an obituary.

== Today ==
Public transport is provided by Southern Vectis buses operating on route 6 between Ventnor and Newport bus station.

Chale Green is home to the Chale Kite Flyers, an informal group of kite flyers.
