= St Peter's Church, Shorwell =

St. Peter's Church, Shorwell
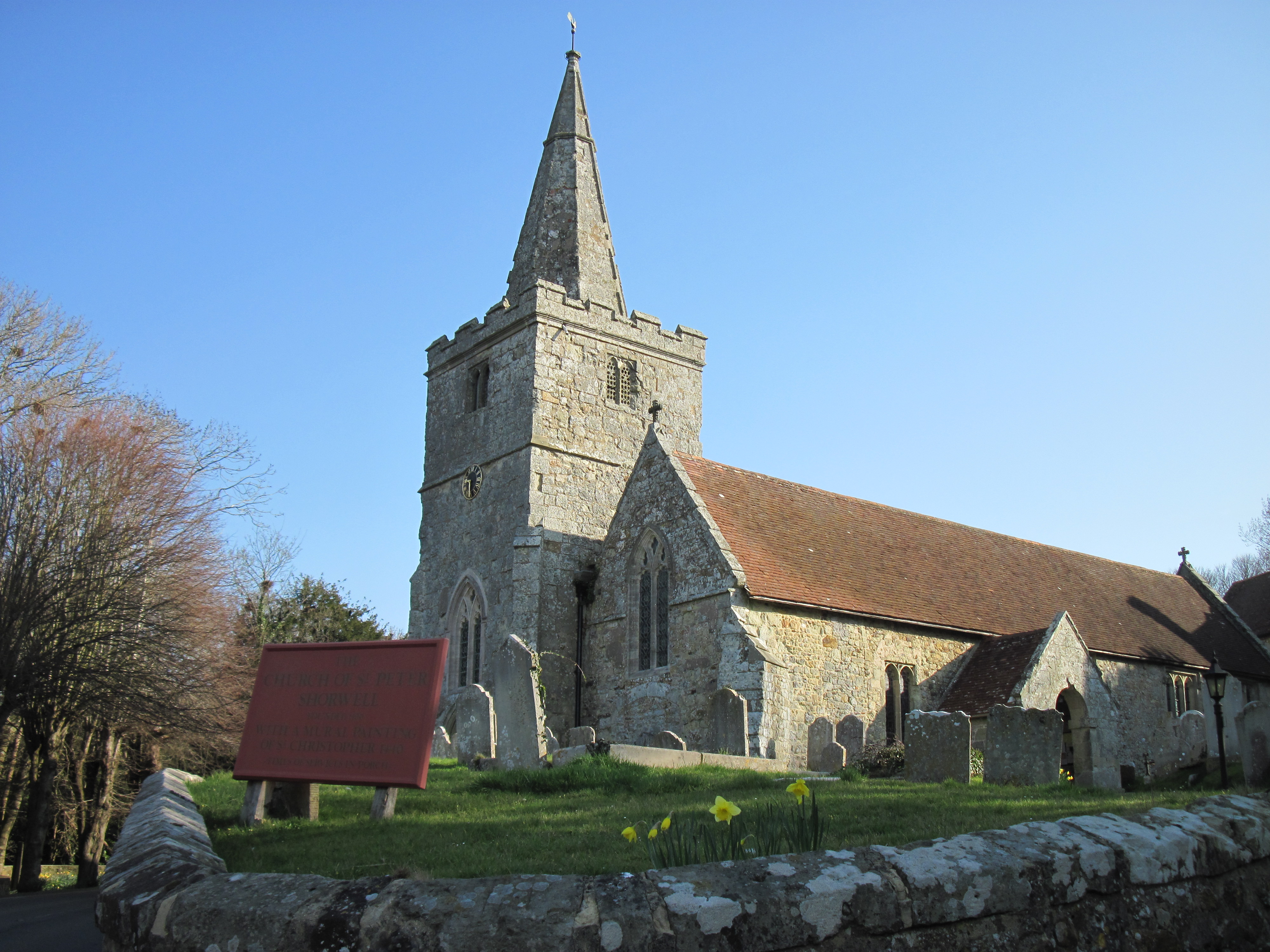
- St. Peter's Church, Shorwell
- 50°38′42″N 01°21′15″W
- Denomination: Church of England
- Churchmanship: Broad Church

History
- Dedication: St. Peter

Administration
- Province: Canterbury
- Diocese: Portsmouth
- Parish: Shorwell

St. Peter's Church, Shorwell is a parish church in the Church of England located in Shorwell, Isle of Wight.

== History ==
The church is medieval.

The interior of the church features a famous 15th century painting of St. Christopher. There is also a painting of the two wives and 15 children of John Leigh.

The church also features an alabaster monument of John Leigh praying, accompanied by his great grandson Barnabas who died at the age of 9 months while Leigh's body was waiting for burial in 1629. They share a tomb which is inscribed;

"Inmate in grave, he took his grandchild heir, Whose soul did haste to make to him repair, And so to heaven along as little page With him did post, to wait upon his age."

== Organ ==
The church acquired its two manual organ from St. Andrew's Church, Chale. It dates from 1890 by Henry Jones. A specification of the organ can be found on the National Pipe Organ Register.
