= James Macarthur (bishop) =

British Anglican Bishop

James Macarthur (7 June 1848 – 2 May 1922) was a British Anglican Bishop in the late 19th and early 20th century.

Macarthur was educated at the University of Glasgow and studied for ordination at Ripon College Cuddesdon. From 1878 he was Curate at St Mary Redcliffe in Bristol before Incumbencies in Lamplugh and Westminster. Promotion to Rural Dean of Ealing followed before his elevation to the episcopate as Bishop of Bombay in 1898. After 5 years he was translated to Southampton.

In 1909, he gave the lych-gate at North Stoneham church in memory of his wife, Emily. It was designed by Isle of Wight architect Percy Stone, and built of oak timber taken from HMS Thunderer which took part in the Battle of Trafalgar.

On 31 December 1920, he resigned his see in ill health; but remained Archdeacon of the Isle of Wight and became assistant bishop for the Island. On 2 May 1922, Macarthur died.

Church of England titles
Preceded by Louis Mylne	Bishop of Bombay; 1898 – 1903	Succeeded by Walter Pym
Preceded by Arthur Lyttelton	Bishop of Southampton; 1903 – 1920	Succeeded by Cecil Boutflower
