= St George's Church, Arreton =

Church in Arreton, Isle of Wight, United Kingdom

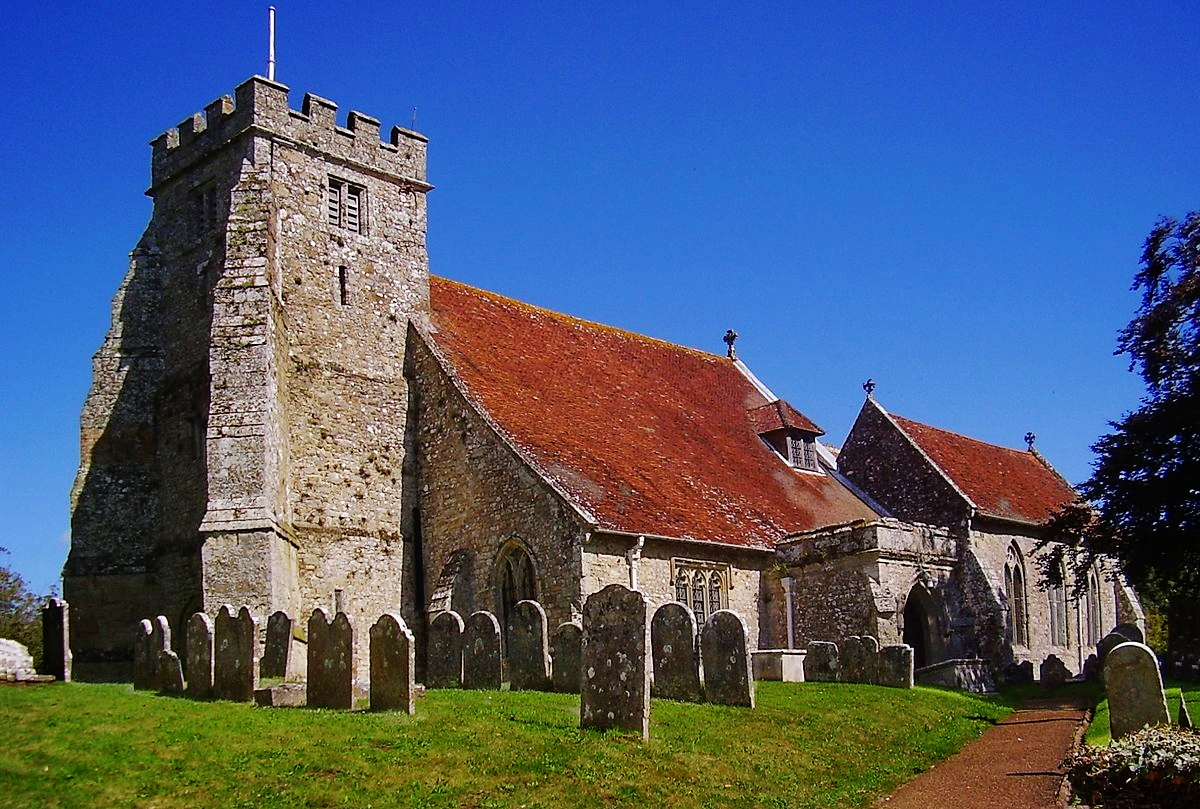
- Church of St George, Arreton
- St George's Church, Arreton
- 50°40′41″N 01°14′30″W
- Denomination: Church of England
- Churchmanship: Broad Church

History
- Dedication: St George

Administration
- Province: Canterbury
- Diocese: Portsmouth
- Parish: Arreton

St George's Church, Arreton, is a parish church in the Church of England located in Arreton, Isle of Wight.

== History ==
The church is medieval and the earliest traces are from the Norman period.

Part of the church dates from the 12th century. The church has a Saxon wall and a Burma Star window. The short tower with its unique buttresses contains a ring of 6 bells, the oldest of which was cast in 1589.

In this parish lived a devout young woman, Elizabeth Wallbridge, made famous as "The Dairyman's Daughter" in an early nineteenth-century poem by Legh Richmond.

The war memorial was designed by local architect, Percy Stone (1856–1934).

== Organ ==
The church has an historic organ dating from 1888 by the organ-builder William Hill. A specification of the organ can be found on the National Pipe Organ Register.
