= Wootton Bridge =

Village on the Isle of Wight, England

Coordinates: 50.7263°N 1.2321°W

- Village
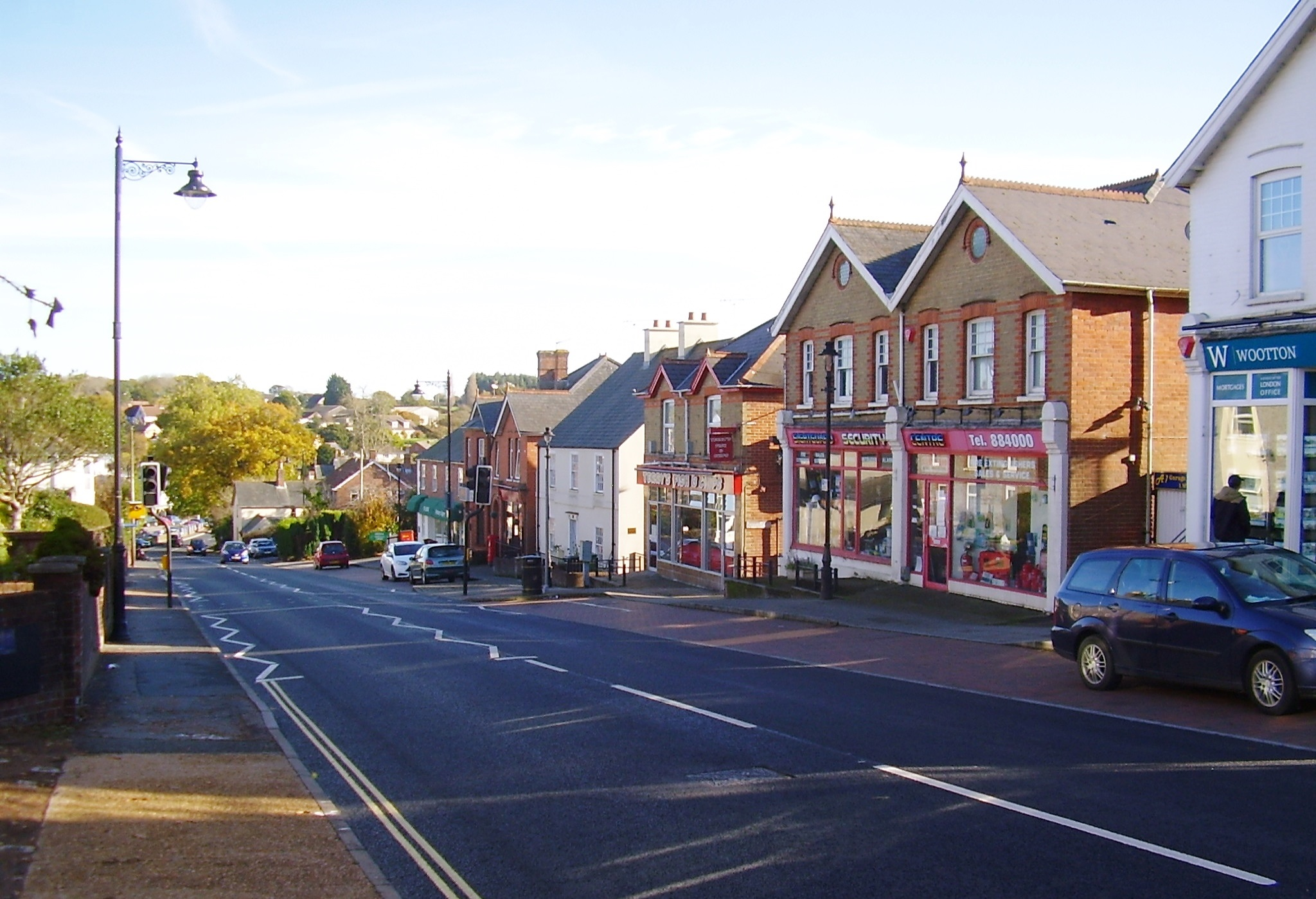
- High Street, Wootton

- Location within the Isle of Wight
- Population: 3,447 (2011)
- OS grid reference: SZ542921
- Civil parish: Wootton Bridge
- Unitary authority: Isle of Wight
- Ceremonial county: Isle of Wight
- Region: South East
- Country: England
- Sovereign state: United Kingdom
- Post town: Ryde
- Postcode district: PO33
- Dialling code: 01983
- Police: Hampshire and Isle of Wight
- Fire: Hampshire and Isle of Wight
- Ambulance: Isle of Wight
- UK Parliament: Isle of Wight East

Wootton Bridge is a large village, civil parish and electoral ward on the Isle of Wight, England, first recorded around the year 1086. The parish also contains the settlement of Wootton. In 2011 it had a population of 3,447.

Wootton is found midway between the towns of Ryde and Newport, which are 7 miles apart, and historically centred on the old parish church of St Edmund. The hamlet of Wootton Common to the south, centres on the crossroads that bears its name.

The newer village of Wootton Bridge is found in the area immediately west of Wootton Creek, and the parish council that bears its name is now responsible for the whole of the Wootton area.

== Village name ==
Its name means 'the wooded farmstead or estate', from Old English wudig (adjective) and tūn.

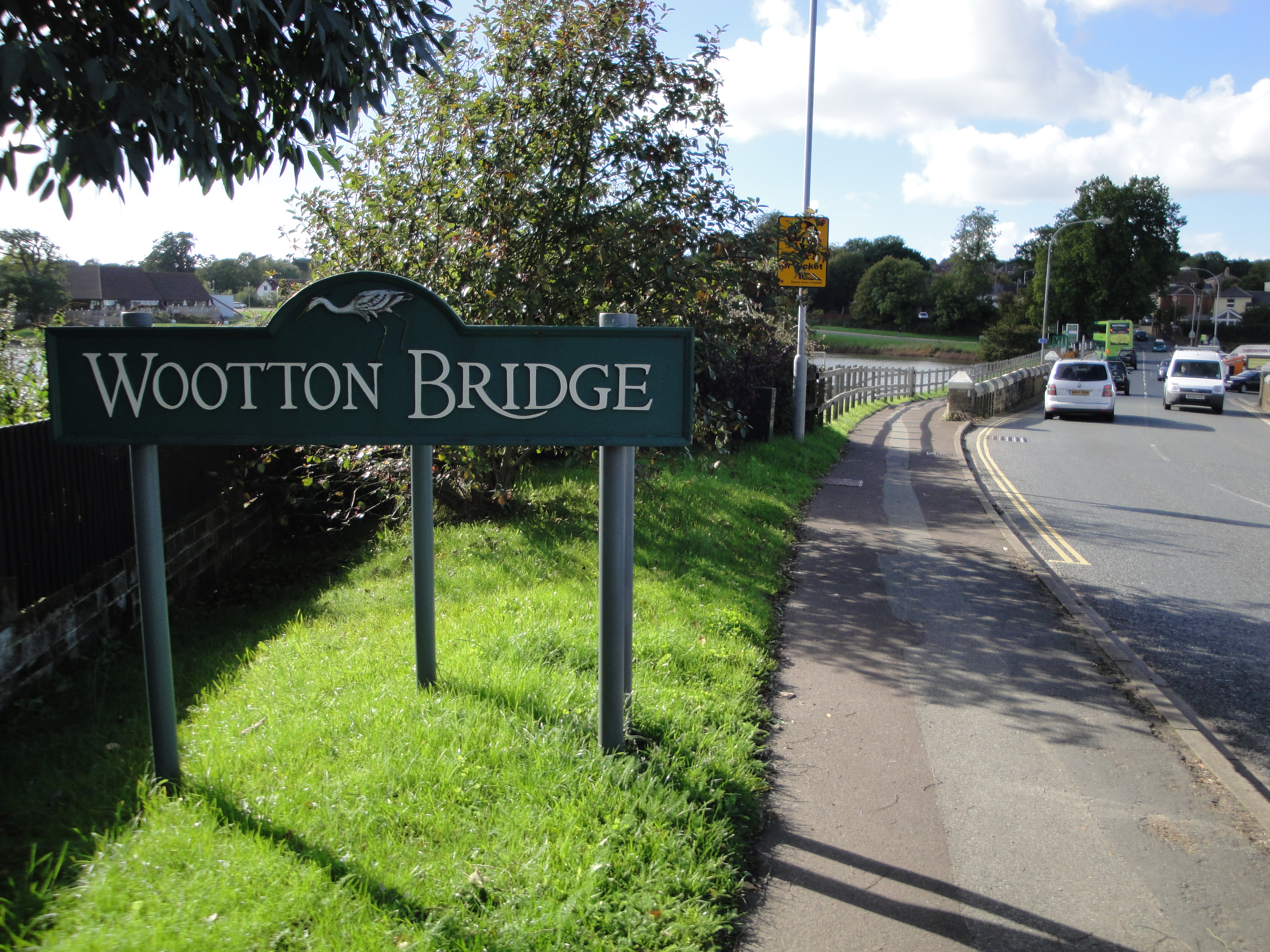
The village of Wootton Bridge is found on the easternmost side of Wootton, bordering with Fishbourne. The symbol depicted on the sign represents a heron.

More recently, following the construction of the bridge across Wootton Creek, the name "Wootton Bridge" has been used to describe the settlement closest to it, however this name is now also used by some to refer to the whole of Wootton. This is possibly due in part to Royal Mail, who used the name "Wootton Bridge" to differentiate Wootton from the 19 other Woottons found across England.

"Wootton Bridge" is described by some as the "modern name" for the area. However, "Wootton" remains firmly established on wayfinding signs and maps of the island, including those of Ordnance Survey and remains the most popular name for the area.

1086: Odeton

1189-1204: Wudeton

1248, 1291: Woditone

1378: Wotton

1608: Wotton Bridge

== Isle of Wight Festival 1969 ==
The 1969 Isle of Wight Festival took place on 29 to 31 August at Woodside Bay in Wootton. The event was one of the largest music festivals to that date, and had an estimated audience of some 150,000. The line-up included Bob Dylan, The Band, The Nice, The Pretty Things, Marsha Hunt, The Who, Third Ear Band, Bonzo Dog Doo-Dah Band, Fat Mattress and Joe Cocker.

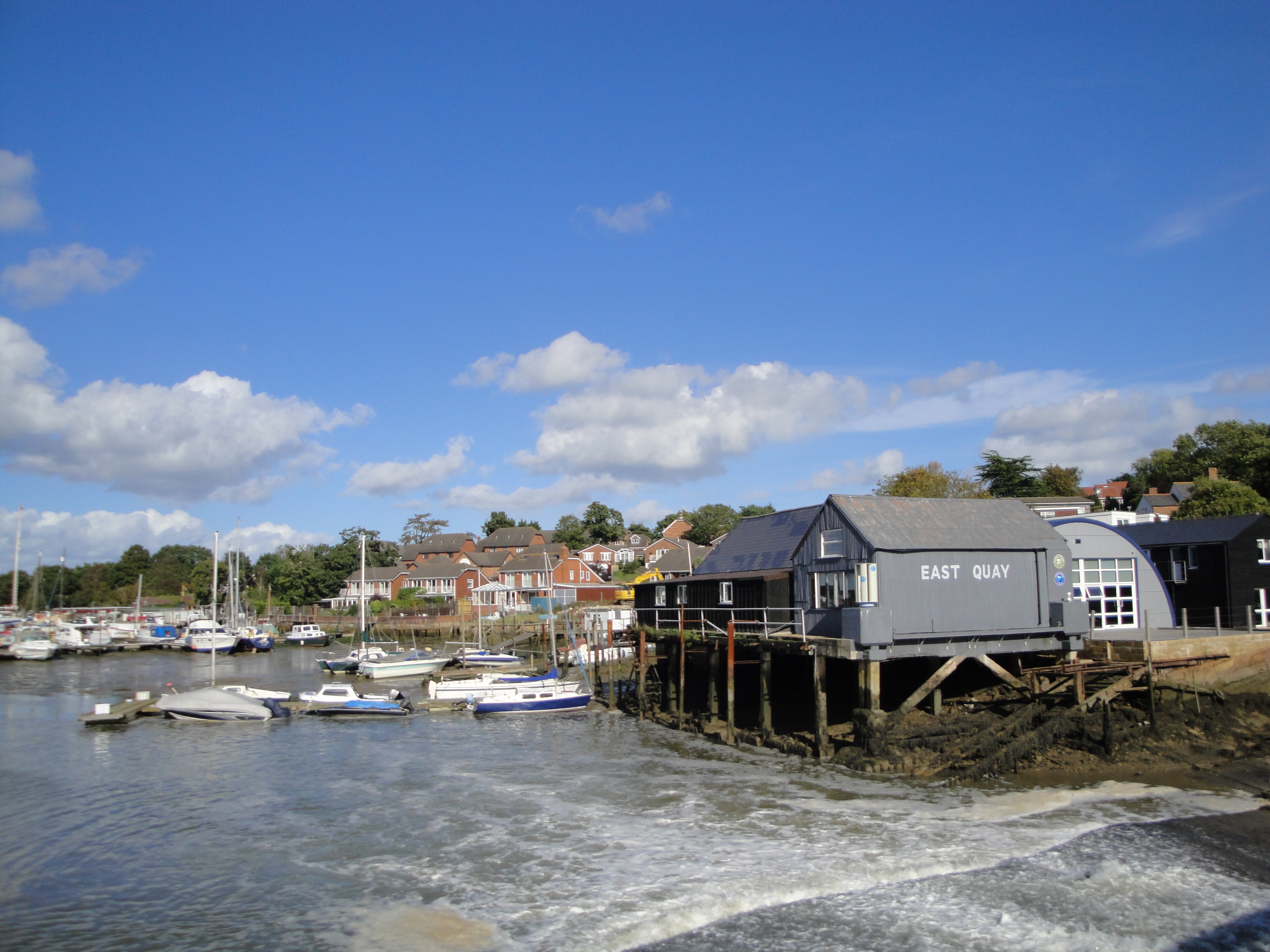
Wootton Creek

== Wootton Creek ==
There is a millpond on Wootton Creek formed by a sluice gate in Wootton Bridge. At one time there was a second sluice gate in the bridge that would use the tidal water from the millpond to power a mill grinding flour. The mill was demolished in 1962 and houses later built on the site.

The pond is part of a Special Area of Conservation and is important for wildfowl and for bats. The heron has been adopted as the symbol of the village. Firestone Copse is a Forestry Commission woodland open to the public which is situated on the edge of the pond.

== Notable features ==
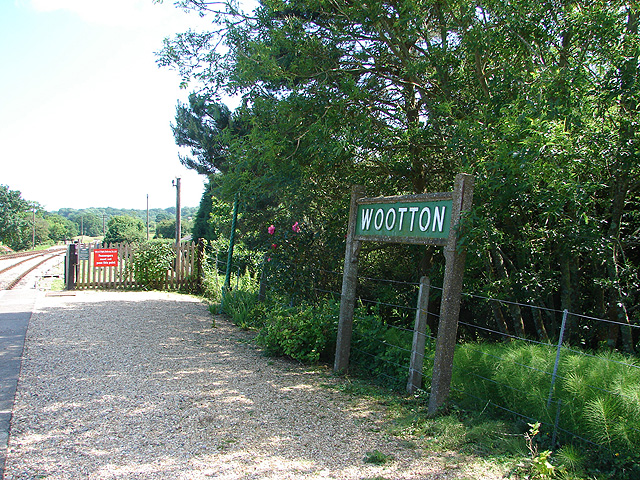
Wootton station sign in June 2008.

=== St. Edmund's Church ===
St. Edmund's Parish Church dates from the 11th century. St. Mark's Church, Wootton is in the south end of the village.

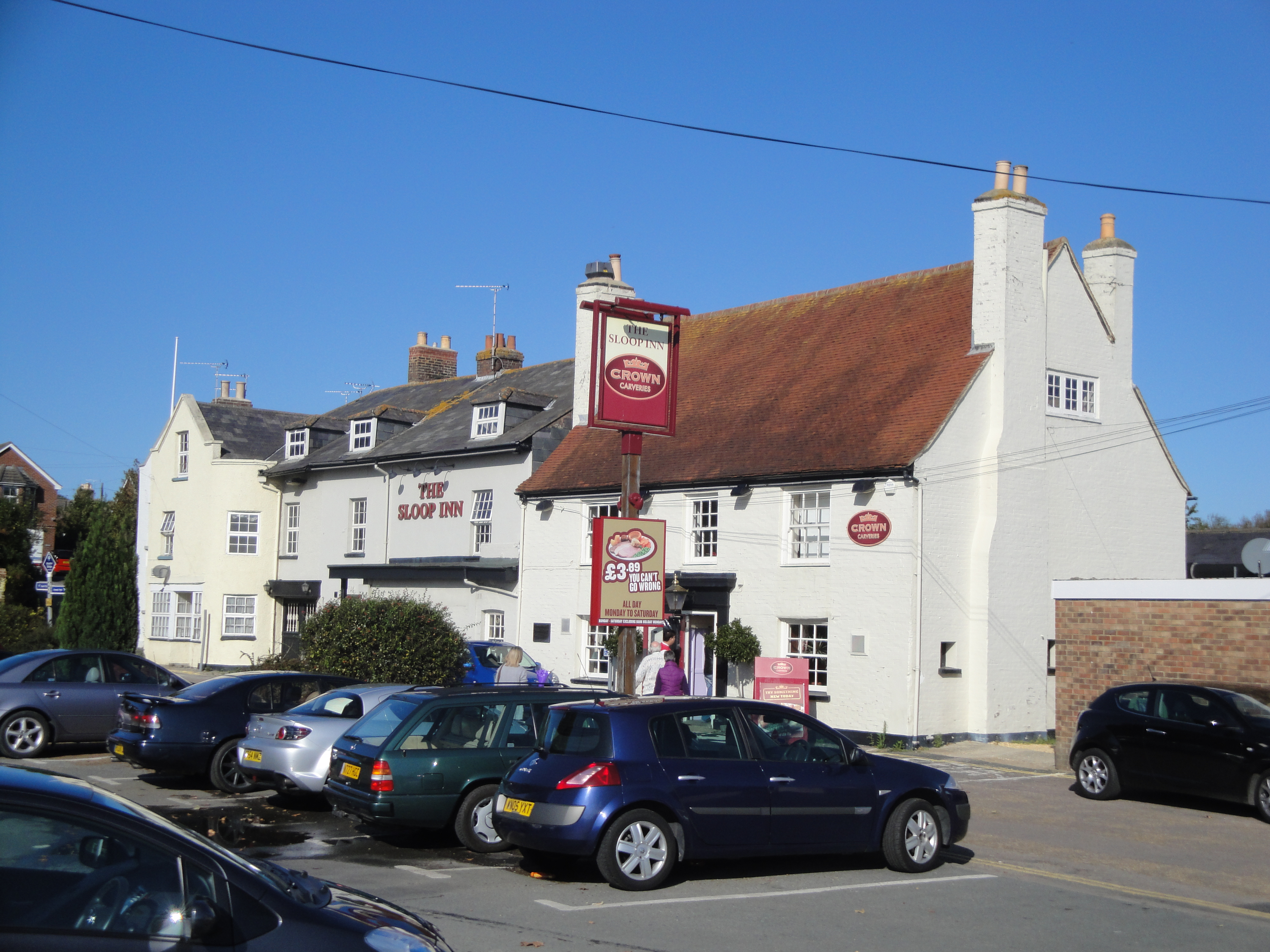
The Sloop Inn

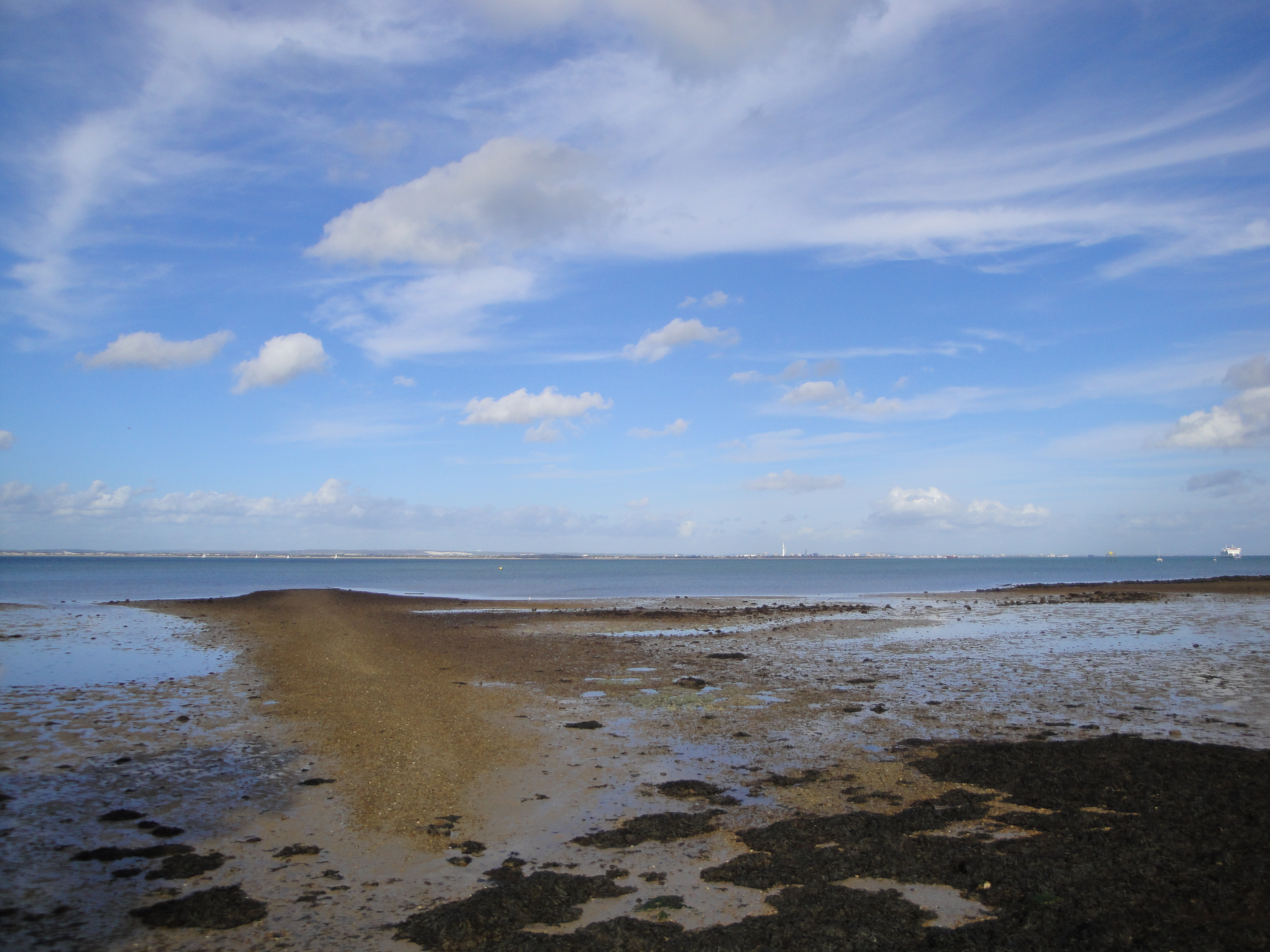
Woodside Beach, Wootton

=== The Sloop Inn (now Tide Mill) ===
The Sloop Inn (now called Tide Mill) is another prominent building in Wootton, with its prime position next to Wootton Bridge. The pub is about 150 years old, and is currently managed by Mitchells & Butlers as part of its Crown Carveries pub chain.

=== The Fernhill Ice House ===
In an area of woodland adjacent to agricultural land and public footpaths just outside the village of Wooton, an ice house can be found in excellent condition, having been maintained by the council since the 1980s. This structure is one of a few remnants of a grand estate called Fernhill, which was destroyed by fire in 1938.

== Transport ==
Southern Vectis bus routes 4, 9 and 34 link Wootton with the towns of Newport, Ryde and East Cowes, including intermediate villages.

=== Wootton Station ===
Wootton Station is the western terminus of the Isle of Wight Steam Railway. The current station, opened in 1987, is in a different location from the original which was closed in 1953. However the authentic station signage from the original is in place in the newer station.

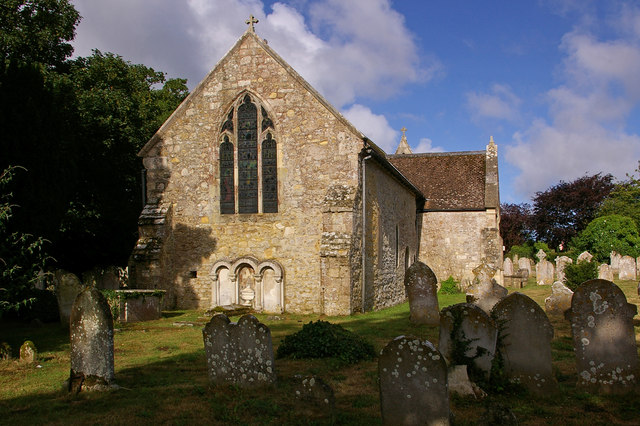
St Edmund's Church

== Notable residents ==
Victorian admiral Sir John Baird died in Wootton in 1908, he is buried in the churchyard.

== See also ==
- List of current places of worship on the Isle of Wight
