= List of schools on the Isle of Wight =

This is a list of schools on the Isle of Wight, England.

== State-funded schools ==
=== Primary schools ===
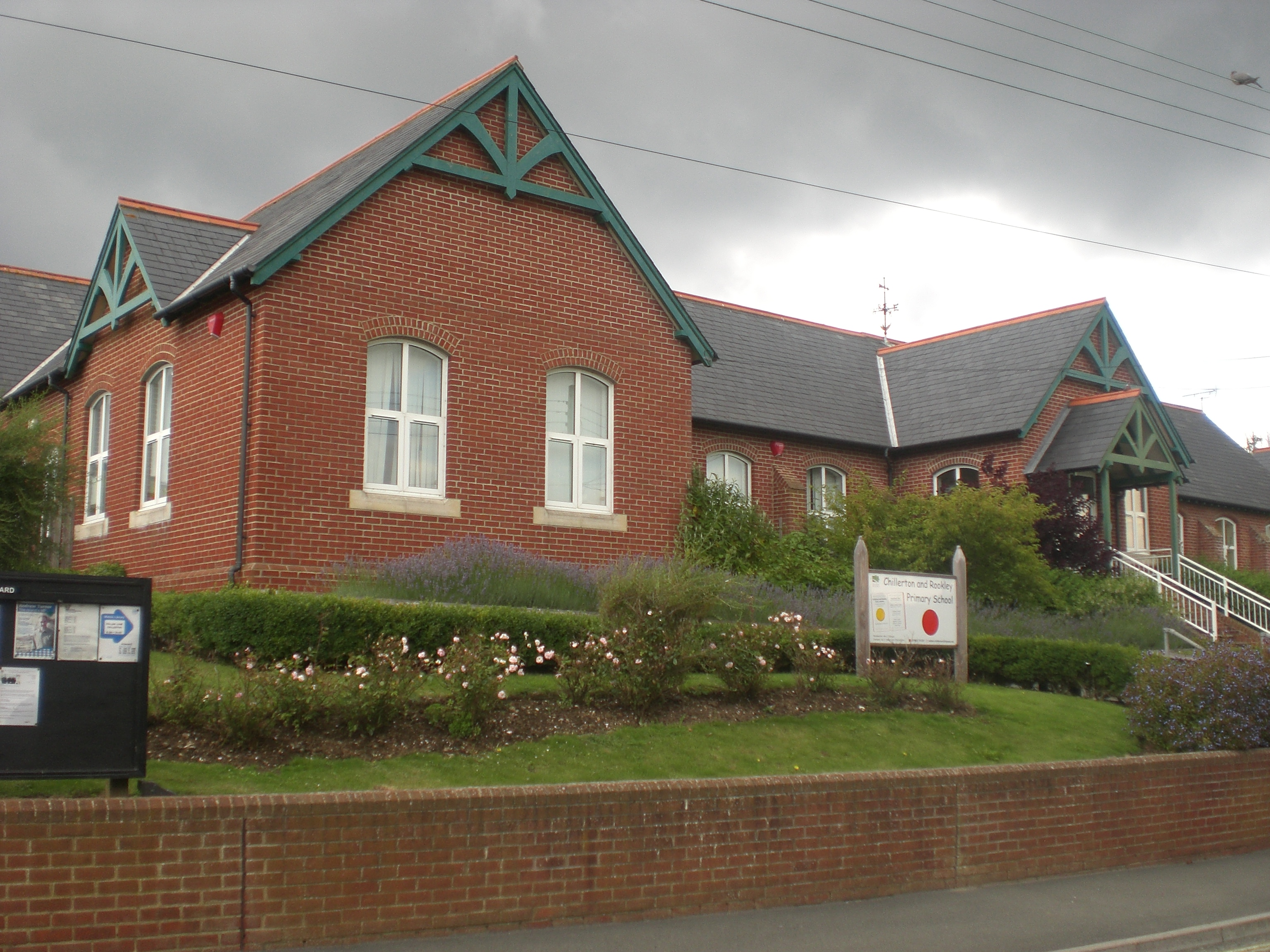
Chillerton and Rookley Primary School.

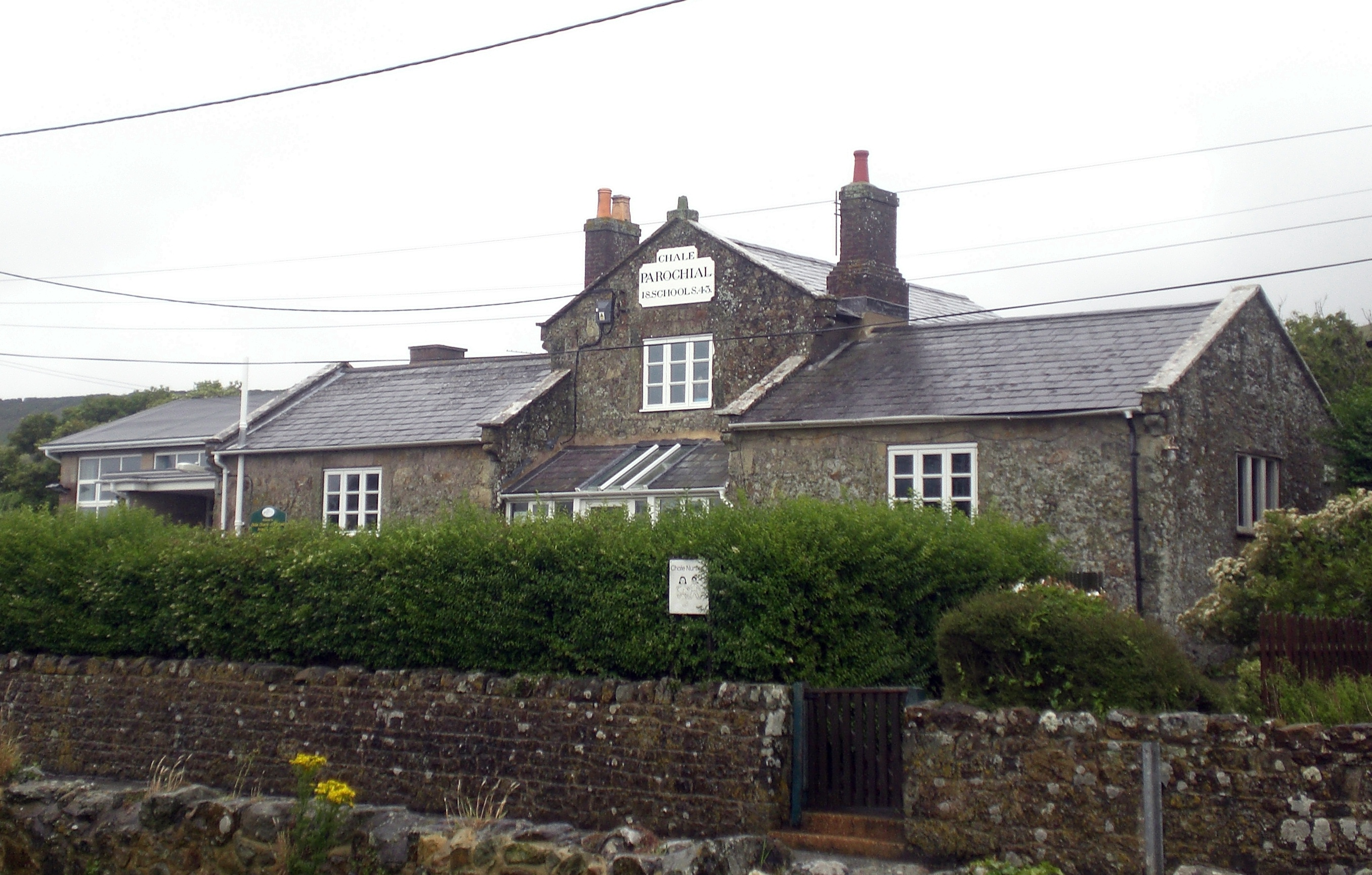
Chale Primary School.

There are currently 39 state-maintained primary schools on the Isle of Wight, after Chale Primary School closed in July 2011 following the schools reorganisation - it had a roll of only 20 pupils. Merges also meant that the number of primary schools on the island decreased: St Wilfrids Catholic Primary, St Boniface C of E Primary and St Margarets C of E Primary (all in Ventnor) all closed and reopened as St Francis Catholic and Church of England Primary School on the site of the old Ventnor Middle School in a purpose built, brand new building; St John's C of E Primary (Sandown) and Sandown C of E Primary School merged to become The Bay C of E Primary School, split across both of the former school sites; and East Cowes Primary School and Whippingham Primary School merged to become Queensgate Foundation Primary School on the old Osborne Middle School site. A number of other primary schools also moved to former middle school sites including Gurnard Primary School to the old Solent Middle School site in Cowes, Hunnyhill Ormiston Academy to the old Kitbridge Middle School site in Newport, Greenmount Primary to the old Mayfield Middle School site in Ryde, Oakfield C of E Primary School to the old Bishop Lovett Middle School site in Ryde, Bembridge Primary School to the old Forelands Middle School site in Bembridge and Broadlea Primary School to the old Lake Middle School site in Lake. In addition, Haylands Primary School has had a brand new school built on the playing fields of the former Swanmore Middle School in Ryde.

Name	Location	Roll	Website
The Bay Church of England School	Sandown	1,281	
Barton Primary School	Newport	129	
Bembridge Church of England Primary School	Bembridge	148	
Binstead Primary School	Binstead	164	
Brading Church of England Primary School	Brading	76	
Brighstone Church of England Primary School	Brighstone	79	
Broadlea Primary School	Sandown	181	
Carisbrooke Church of England Primary School	Carisbrooke	232	
Chillerton and Rookley Primary School	Chillerton	43	
Cowes Primary School	Cowes	277	
Dover Park Primary School	Ryde	221	
Gatten and Lake Primary School	Shanklin	159	
Godshill Primary School	Godshill	159	
Greenmount Primary School	Ryde	149	
Gurnard Primary School	Gurnard	166	
Haylands Primary School	Haylands, Ryde	183	
Holy Cross Catholic Primary School	East Cowes	140	
Hunnyhill Ormiston Academy	Newport	144	
Lanesend Primary School	Cowes	438	
Nettlestone Primary School	Seaview	130	
Newchurch Primary School	Newchurch	144	
Newport Church of England Primary School	Newport	250	
Nine Acres Primary School	Newport	359	
Niton Primary School	Niton	100	
Northwood Primary School	Northwood	177	
Oakfield Church of England Primary School	Oakfield	172	
Queensgate Primary School	East Cowes	400	
St Blasius Shanklin Church of England Primary Academy	Shanklin	197	
St Francis RC & C Primary Academy	Ventnor	69	
St Helens Primary School	St Helens	61	
St Mary's Catholic Primary School	Ryde	143	
St Saviour's Catholic Primary School	Totland	111	
St Thomas of Canterbury Catholic Primary School	Carisbrooke	76	
Shalfleet Church of England Primary School	Ningwood	109	
Summerfields Primary School	Newport	104	
Wootton Primary School	Wootton Bridge	134	
Wroxall Primary School	Wroxall	77	

=== Secondary schools ===
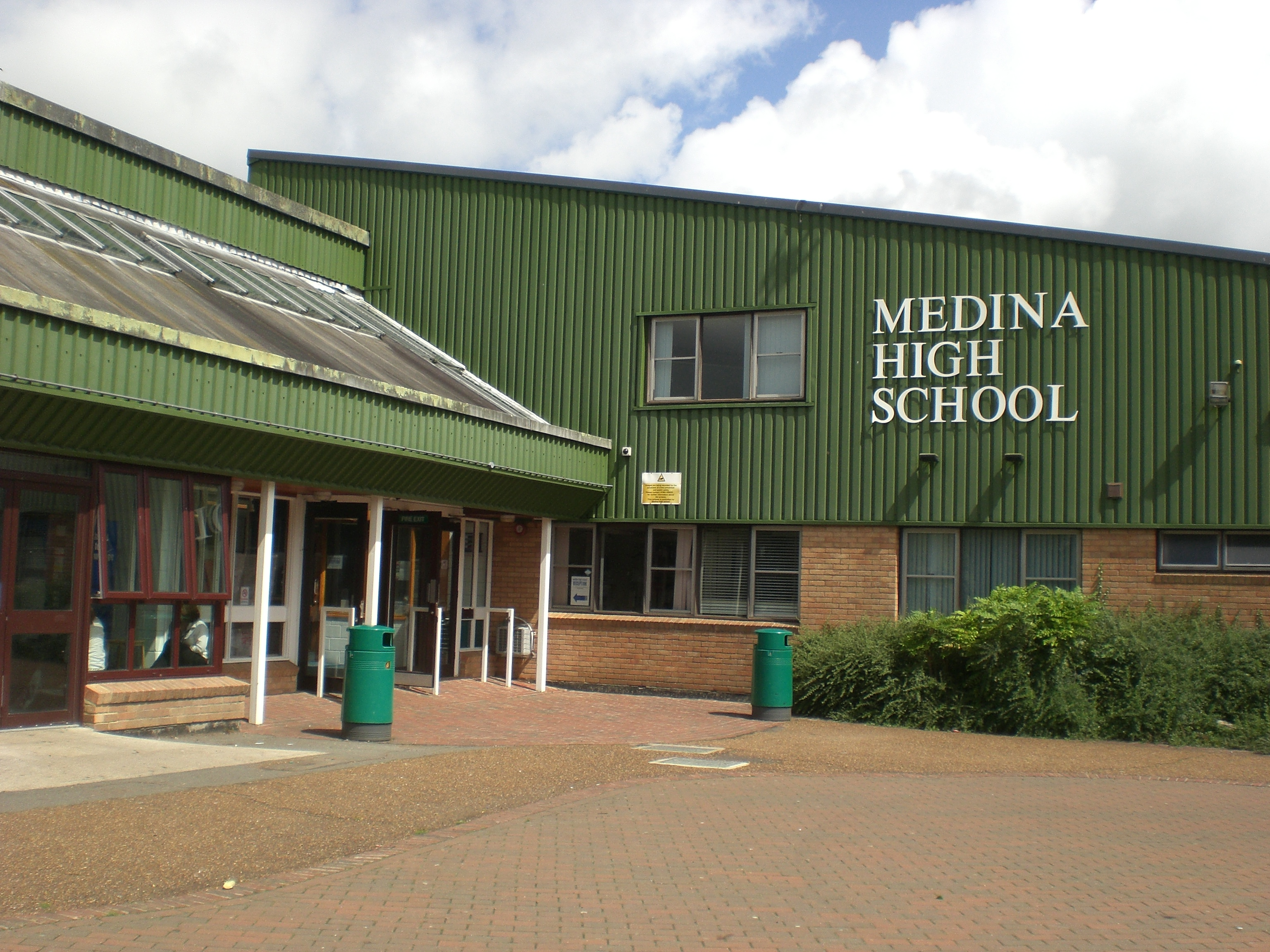
Medina High School, in Newport.

There are currently seven island secondary schools, five of which also have a sixth form. The sixth forms for Carisbrooke College and Medina College are merged, and are based at the new Island Innovation VI Form Campus, on the site of the former Nodehill Middle School in the centre of Newport. The Island Free School and The Bay Church of England School do not operate a sixth form.

Name	Location	Roll	Average GCSE A* - C pass rate	Website
The Bay Church of England School	Sandown	1,281		
Carisbrooke College	Carisbrooke	1,375	67%	
Christ the King College	Carisbrooke	1,576	77.1%	
Cowes Enterprise College	Cowes	964	58%	
The Island Free School	Ventnor	621		
Medina College	Newport	1,094	58%	
Ryde Academy	Ryde	955	49%	

=== Special and alternative schools ===
State-maintained special schools on the Isle of Wight include:

- Island Learning Centre (Pupil Referral Unit)
- Medina House School
- St George's School

=== Further and higher education ===
Isle of Wight College acts as the main provider of vocational further education on the island, as well as offers higher education through University Centre Isle of Wight.

== Independent schools ==
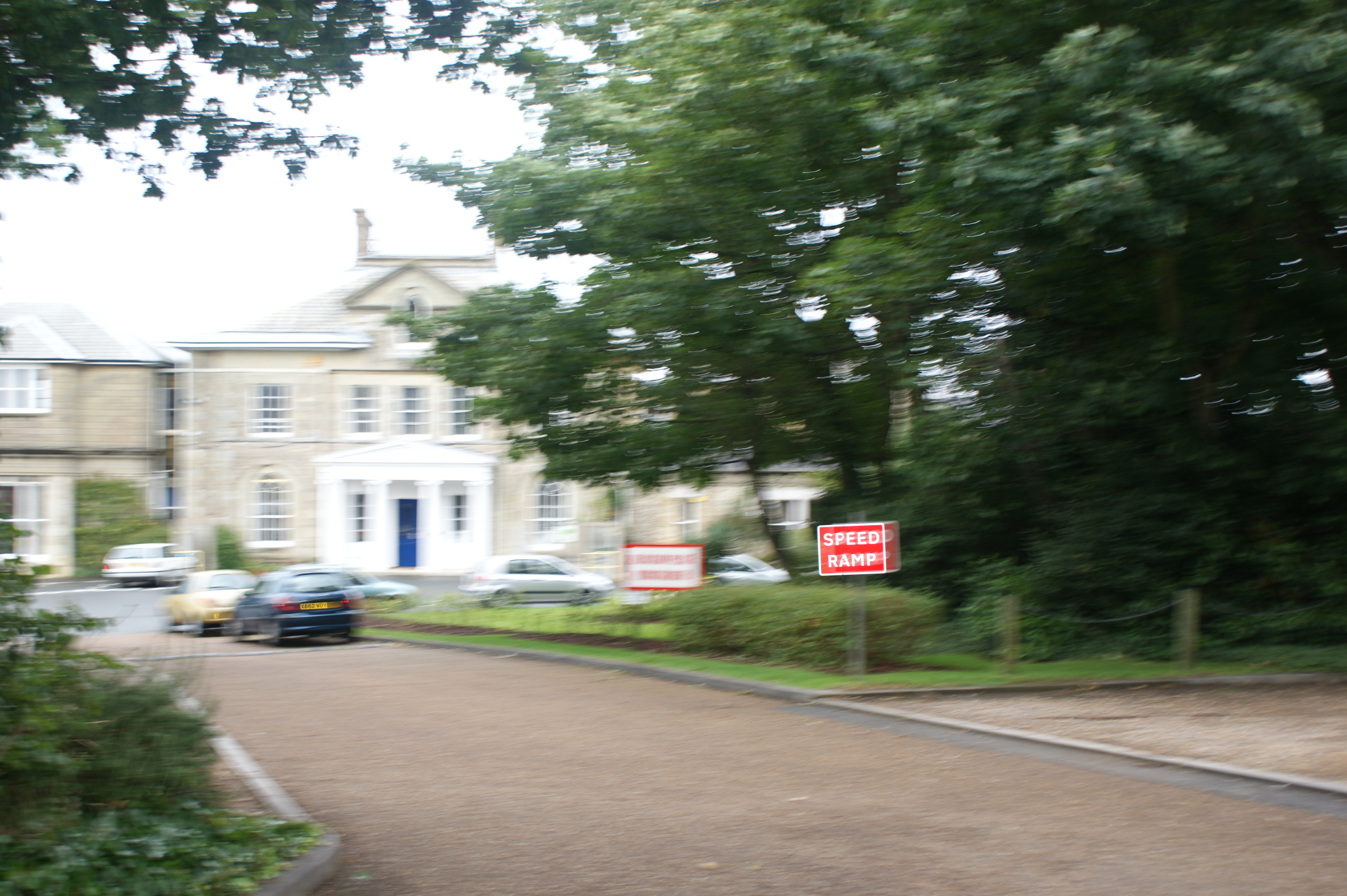
Ryde School with Upper Chine.

=== Senior and alternative schools ===
- Priory School
- Ryde School with Upper Chine

=== Special and alternative schools ===
- OEA Education
- St Catherines School

== Former schools ==
=== Primary schools ===
Weston Academy closed in 2015.

Arreton St. George's Primary school and Cowes Primary School Closed in 2025.

Yarmouth Church of England Primary School is now closed.

=== Middle schools ===
Previous middle schools below have now been phased out during the transition to a two-tier education system. Education on the Island has really suffered since this happened and most of the secondary schools are now deemed unsatisfactory or have gone into special measures.

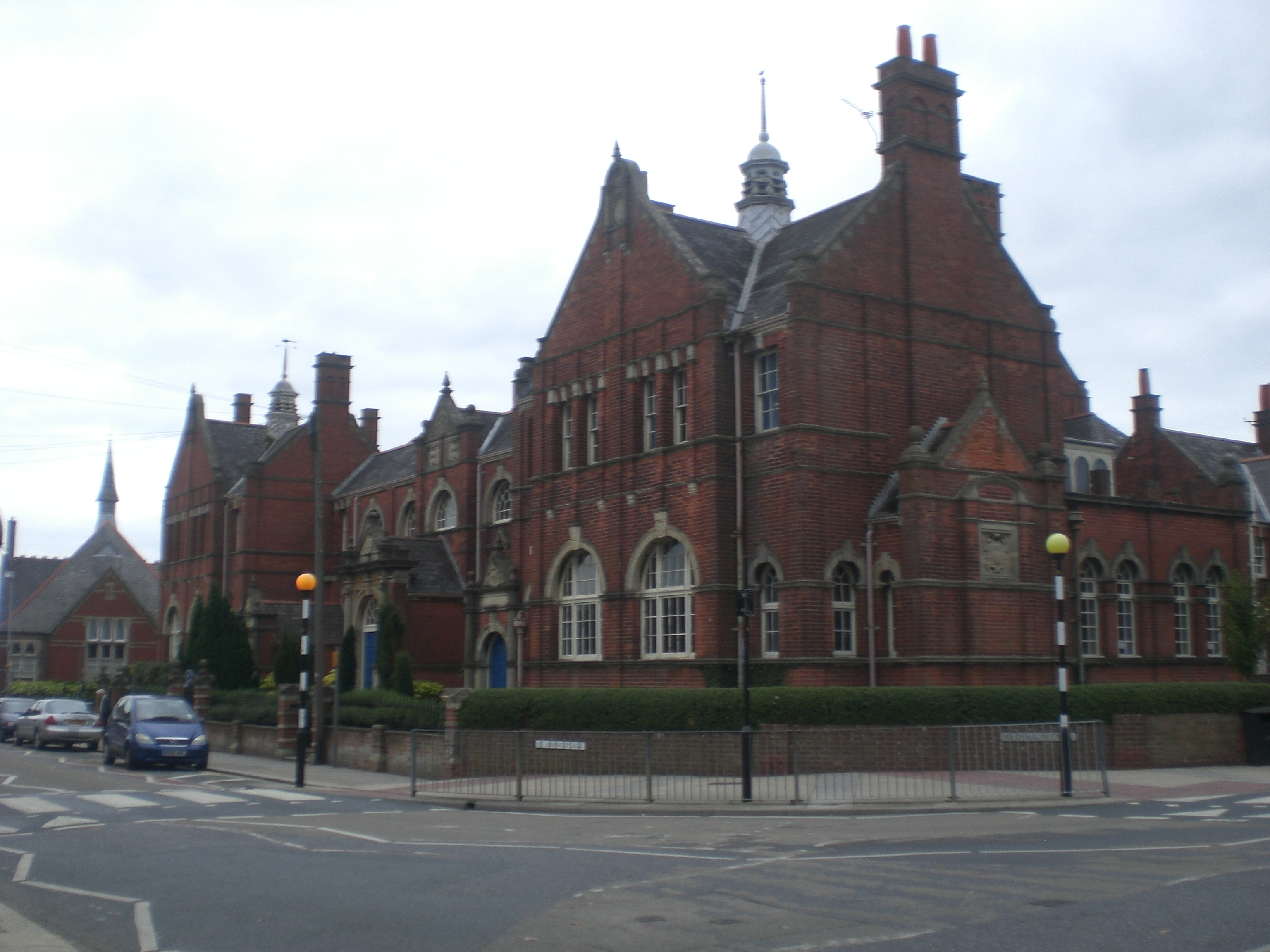
Nodehill Middle School.

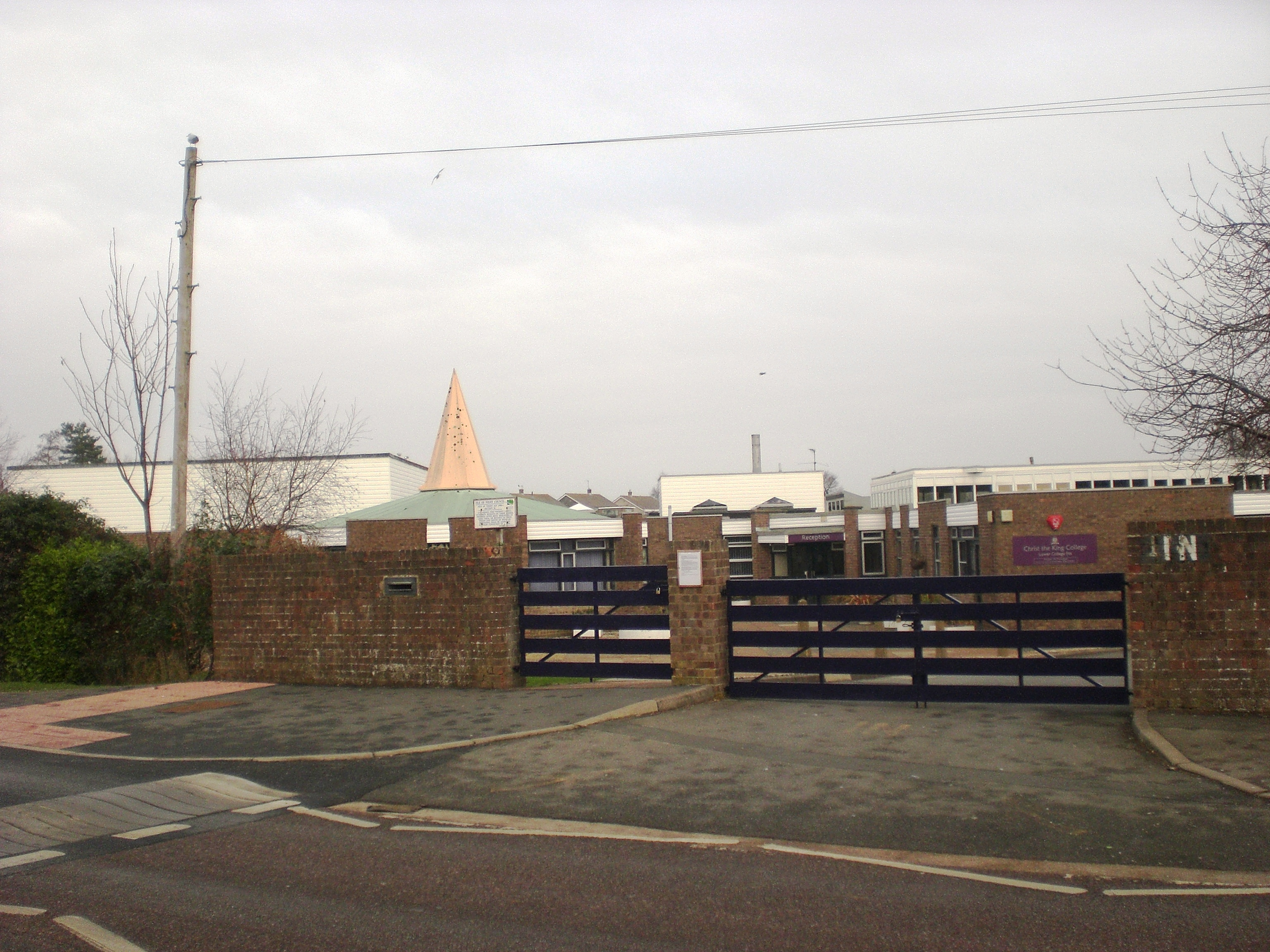
The lower campus of Christ the King College (formerly Trinity Church of England Middle School).

There were originally 16 state-maintained middle schools on the Isle of Wight, including two voluntary aided church schools (which were the foundation for the new Christ the King College) and two controlled church schools. In July 2008, the two voluntary aided middle schools (Archbishop King Catholic Middle School and Trinity Church of England Middle School), which are both located on Wellington Road in Carisbrooke, closed and reopened in September of the same year as Christ the King College, and from September 2009, kept on its Year 8 pupils of the previous academic year as Year 9 pupils and started the transition from middle school to secondary school age range. In line with the rest of the Island, September 2009 was the last year in which a Year 5 was admitted to the Christ the King College. Instead, all Year 5 pupils, and then consequently Year 6 pupils, on the island remained in primary schools from September 2010 onwards. Additionally, Kitbridge Middle School became federated with Downside Middle School, and the two schools both became Downside Middle School, but were split across the two separate campuses in Newport; Furrlongs Campus and Kitbridge Campus.

Name	Location	Roll	Website
Archbishop King Roman Catholic (voluntary aided) Middle School	Carisbrooke	360	
Bishop Lovett Church of England (controlled) Middle School	Ryde	394	
Downside Middle School	Newport	202	
Forelands Middle School	Bembridge	214	
Lake Middle School	Shanklin	578	
Mayfield Church of England (voluntary controlled) Middle School	Ryde	428	
Nodehill Middle School	Newport	641	
Osborne Middle School	East Cowes	373	
Sandham Middle School	Sandown	550	
Solent Middle School	Cowes	383	
Somerton Middle School	Cowes	278	
Swanmore Middle School	Ryde	268	
Trinity Church of England (voluntary aided) Middle School	Carisbrooke	368	
Ventnor Middle School	Ventnor	436	
West Wight Middle School	Freshwater	282	

All middle schools on the island, other than Christ The King College, closed for pupils as of 21 July 2011. Instead of the four years at middle school, children have been given 2 extra years in primary school and then move straight onto secondary school. Children already in middle school transferred straight to the new secondary schools at the start of the next academic year, whether they are in year 6, 7 or 8.

=== Secondary schools ===
Sandown Bay Academy (formerly Sandown High School) closed in 2018. Isle of Wight Studio School closed a year later.

=== Independent schools ===
Bembridge School was in operation on the island from 1919 to 1997.

== See also ==
- Education on the Isle of Wight
- Education in England
- List of schools in the South East of England
