= Education on the Isle of Wight =

Education on the Isle of Wight is provided by local education authority-maintained schools on the Isle of Wight, and independent schools. As a rural community, many of these schools are small, with average numbers of pupils lower than in many urban areas. It was decided on 19 March 2008, in a Whole Council Meeting, that the three-tier system would change into a two tier system. A report into the report on the re-organisation with proposals as to which schools would close was published in May 2008. There is also a college on the Isle of Wight and other less formal educational venues.

== School system ==
The Isle of Wight now conforms to the general pattern of education in the United Kingdom in which pupils at state schools change schools at the age of eleven (see Education in England). Pupils at both of the island's independent schools also change school at the age of eleven. State schools on the island now uses a two-tier system.

== Types of school ==
The following types of school now exist:

=== State schools ===
- Primary Schools – There are 41 primary schools on the island, taking pupils from age four plus to eleven[the reception year to year 6]. Nineteen of these primary schools are Church of England or Catholic aided or controlled. Most primary schools have pre-school facilities.
- Secondary Schools – There are six secondary schools, taking pupils from age 11 to 18 (compulsory years 7 to 11 and sixth form years 12 and 13). Additionally there is one studio school taking pupils from age 13 to 18 (compulsory years 9 to 11 and sixth form years 12 and 13).
  - Carisbrooke College, (near Newport) – Sports Specialist
  - Cowes Enterprise College – Science Specialist
  - Isle of Wight Studio School - Studio school
  - Medina College – Performance Arts Specialist
  - Ryde Academy – Language and Arts College
  - Sandown Bay Academy – Sports Specialist
  - Christ the King College – Maths & ICT Specialist

=== Independent schools ===
There are two independent schools on the Isle of Wight, which educate pupils from the early years to the age of 18:

- Priory School (Whippingham)
  - Junior School for pupils aged 4 to 11 years
  - Senior School for pupils aged 11 to 16 years
  - Sixth Form for pupils aged 16 to 18 years
- Ryde School with Upper Chine (Ryde)
  - Fiveways (pre-prep) for pupils aged 3 to 7 years
  - Prep School for pupils aged 7 to 11 years
  - Senior School for pupils aged 11 to 16 years
  - Sixth Form for pupils aged 16 to 18 years

== Timeline of the debate leading to the new arrangements ==
In 2006, the regional Learning and Skills Council proposed to replace the state school sixth forms with central provision at the Isle of Wight College. In January 2007, the authority rejected this proposal, and instead offered its own, which included a reduced number of secondary schools, and the retention of Year 9 pupils in Middle schools, extending their range to form 9–14 schools – a unique arrangement in the United Kingdom – and 14–19 provision at High Schools.

In January 2008, more reforms were put forward, which could see the closure of at least half of the Island's primary schools. On 14 January 2008 it was announced that at least 23 primary schools and 1 middle school (likely to be Nodehill Middle School) would be closed by whichever education pathway was chosen in March.

Option 1:

Primary/juniorhigh/learning centres, which would leave the Island with 32 primary schools, 10 Junior High Schools and 3 Learning Centres.

Option 2:

Two-tier primary/secondary set-up, which would leave the Island with 24 primary schools, 4 secondary schools and 1 faith college.

Option 3:

A similar two-tier set-up, which would leave the Island with 33 primary schools, 5 secondary schools and 1 faith college.

The schools would be spread out across the Island in Cowes, East Cowes, Ryde, East Wight, South East Wight, South Wight, West Wight and Newport. Trinity CE Middle School and ABK RC Middle School would join to form the faith college, Christ The King College, which will serve students from 11 – 19 once the transition phase is over, which would be based on the current Carisbrooke High School site.

Under all the options currently on offer, all the island schools close, however some will re-open on the existing site, while others will be moved to new sites. The Isle of Wight Council says it could save up to £2 million a year in money that would be spent on small primary schools, that under the new system, wouldn't be needed. The changes will begin to be introduced from September 2010, although some could happen earlier.

There were also calls for a fourth option of extending middle schools to year 9. This would save primary schools across the Island in rural locations and enable middle and high schools to almost continue to function as they are, although this fourth option is unlikely to go ahead.

The 'biggest protest the Island has ever seen' occurred outside County Hall in Newport on Saturday 26 January at 10:00am lasting an hour until 11:00am, led by Isle of Wight Radio DJ Alex Dyke as a result of the Council's plans for education reforms. Between 1,000 and 1,250 took part in the protest, including parents, teachers and students. The Island MP Andrew Turner, with two other councillors also attended the protest, disagreeing with the plans.

More protests later occurred at Sandown, Shanklin and Ryde, with another at Newport. On 19 March 2008, a two-tier system was voted for by Isle of Wight councillors, bringing the island's school system into line with the rest of the country.

It was finally announced in the Isle of Wight County Press on 23 May 2008 which schools would be closed.

The first of these reforms took place in September 2008, from the start of the new academic year. Archbishop King and Trinity Middle schools merged creating Christ the King College, with the old ABK site taking years 7 and 8, and the Trinity site taking years 5 and 6. Kitbridge Middle School also merged with Downside Middle school, creating two separate campuses. In September 2009, Christ the King College took another step towards becoming a secondary school, with its year 9 being retained rather than transitioning to high school.

== Adult education ==
The Isle of Wight College provides a selection of courses, mostly offered on its campus in Newport. However, there are many other providers of adult education on the Isle of Wight including libraries, museums, Leisure Centres, West Wight Training Centre, Learning Links, Ventnor Community Projects, Quay Arts, Platform One and the Isle of Wight Council.

The local Council provides a wide range of adult and community learning opportunities. For example, the Council offers family learning opportunities, where parents and children learn together in schools. The Council also has developed community learning programmes which are delivered in communities to overcome difficulties in accessing learning such as time, transport and affordability.

== GCSE results 2012 ==
The first results after the 2012 Reorganisation were announced in October 2012. The Isle of Wight came 150th from 151 local authorities.

== Qualifications ==
From census data taken in 2001, the percentage of qualification levels of people aged 16–74, living on the Isle of Wight are:

Qualifications	Isle of Wight	England and Wales
No qualifications	30.19	29.08
Highest qualification attained Level 1	18.49	16.57
Highest qualification attained Level 2	20.76	19.38
Highest qualification attained Level 3	6.42	8.27
Highest qualification attained Level 4/5	15.27	19.76
Other qualifications/level unknown	8.87	6.94

- Level 1 = 1+ O level passes, 1+ CSE/GCSE any grades, NVQ level 1, Foundation GNVQ
- Level 2 = 5+ O level passes, 5+ CSEs (Grade 1s), 5+ GCSEs (grades A*-C), School Certificate, 1+ A levels/AS levels, NVQ level2, Intermediate GNVQ
- Level 3 = 2+ A levels, 4+ AS levels, Higher School Certificate, NVQ level 3, Advanced GNVQ
- Level 4/5 = First degree, Higher degree, NVQ levels 4 and 5, HNC, HND, Qualified Teacher Status, Qualified Medical Doctor, Qualified Dentist, Qualified Nurse, Midwife, Health Visitor.

== See also ==
- Education in England
- List of schools on the Isle of Wight
