= Island Innovation Trust =

The old logo of the Isle of Wight Education Federation

The Isle of Wight Education Federation is a non-profit investment trust on the Isle of Wight. It is the foundation trust which acts as parent for Carisbrooke College, Medina College and the Island Innovation VI Form Campus.

The Isle of Wight Education Federation has the following aim:

The Isle of Wight Education Federation provides a local platform to develop and enhance opportunities for young people through the creation of a holistic, outward-looking and innovative approach focused on raising the standards of young people's health, education and achievement.

Its trust partners are Quay Arts, University of Portsmouth, Solo Agency and Promoters, Yokogawa Marex Limited, The Quarr Group and Isle of Wight Primary Care Trust (NHS Isle of Wight).

== History ==
The Trust is founded in 2009 under the name of Medina Innovation Trust on 16 January 2009. After broadening its scope, it changed its name to Island Innovation Trust in December of the same year.

The trust was founded to help the Isle of Wight Council with its reorganisation of the second level education on the island. Therefore, it admitted proposals to establish two secondary schools in Newport and Carisbrooke Both proposals were accepted and the schools opened their doors for students in September 2011.

2019 the Island Innovation Trust was renamed to the Isle of Wight Education Federation.
