= Basketball at the 2011 Island Games – Women's tournament =

The women's tournament was held from 26 June–1 July 2011 at the Medina Leisure Centre, Newport and Cowes High School, Cowes.

== Format ==
The six teams were split into two groups of three teams. The winner of each group advanced to the semifinals, while the second and third team of the groups played in the quarterfinals.

== Teams ==
- Bermuda
- Cayman Islands
- Gibraltar
- Guernsey
- Isle of Man
- Isle of Wight

== Group stage ==
=== Group A ===
Team	Pld	W	L	PF	PA	PD	Pts.
Guernsey	2	2	0	115	82	+35	4
Bermuda	2	1	1	122	90	+32	3
Isle of Wight	2	0	2	62	127	−65	2

June 26, 2011
12:00

Isle of Wight	30–57	Guernsey

Cowes High School, Cowes

June 27, 2011
14:00

Guernsey	58–52	Bermuda

Cowes High School, Cowes

June 28, 2011
11:15

Bermuda	70–32	Isle of Wight

Cowes High School, Cowes

=== Group B ===
Team	Pld	W	L	PF	PA	PD	Pts.
Menorca	2	2	0	183	66	+97	4
Gibraltar	2	1	1	87	104	−17	3
Isle of Man	2	0	2	75	153	−80	2

June 26, 2011
14:00

Menorca	73–44	Gibraltar

Cowes High School, Cowes

June 27, 2011
12:00

Gibraltar	43–41	Isle of Man

Cowes High School, Cowes

June 28, 2011
13:15

Isle of Man	42–110	Menorca

Cowes High School, Cowes

== Knockout stage ==
Quarter-finals
June 29
Guernsey
Bye
June 29
Isle of Wight	17
Gibraltar	71
June 29
Bermuda	36
Isle of Man	24
June 29
Menorca
Bye

Semi-finals
June 30
Guernsey	36
Gibraltar	58
June 30
Bermuda	32
Menorca	100

Final
July 1
Gibraltar	48
Menorca	80
Third place
July 1
Guernsey	55
Bermuda	47

=== Quarterfinals ===
June 29, 2011
11:00

Isle of Wight	17–71	Gibraltar

Cowes High School, Cowes

June 29, 2011
13:00

Bermuda	36–24	Isle of Man

Cowes High School, Cowes

=== Semifinals ===
June 30, 2011
11:00

Guernsey	36–58	Gibraltar

Medina Leisure Centre, Newport

June 30, 2011
17:30

Menorca	100–32	Bermuda

Medina Leisure Centre, Newport

=== Fifth place game ===
June 30, 2011
19:00

Isle of Man	38–34	Isle of Wight

Cowes High School, Cowes

=== Bronze medal game ===
July 1, 2011
09:00

Guernsey	55–47	Bermuda

Medina Leisure Centre, Newport

=== Gold medal game ===
July 1, 2011
13:00

Gibraltar	48–80	Menorca

Medina Leisure Centre, Newport
