= Lift Ryde =

Coordinates: 50.7225°N 1.1751°W

Location
- Pell Lane; Ryde, Isle of Wight, PO33 3LN; England

Information
- Type: Academy
- Motto: Find your remarkable
- Established: 2011
- Trust: Lift Schools (Formerly Academies Enterprise Trust)
- Department for Education URN: 136753 Tables
- Ofsted: Reports
- Head teacher: Will Doyle
- Gender: Coeducational
- Age: 11 to 18
- Website: liftryde.org

Lift Ryde, formerly Ryde High School and Ryde Academy, is an academy status secondary school, including sixth form, located in Ryde on the Isle of Wight, England. It has been run by Lift Schools (formerly Academies Enterprise Trust) since 2012.

== History ==
Education on the school site began with Ryde High School, which was a 13–18 school built and opened in 1964 to accommodate the expanding population of Ryde, the largest town on the Isle of Wight. The school was successful in achieving a Specialist Languages Status and a Media and Arts Specialism. In 2008 the Isle of Wight education authority decided to abolish the tripartite education system (of First schools, Middle Schools and High Schools) and instead adopt the two stage Primary School and Secondary school model used by the majority of authorities in England. According to the new two stage model Ryde High School would be extended from the 712 pupils of 13–18 age range, and it would become an Academy for 1200 pupils aged 11–18.

Academy chains were invited to bid for the contract to run the new Ryde Academy 11–18 school. The contract was won by Academies Enterprise Trust (AET), which took over Ryde Academy (and also two other schools on the Isle of Wight, Sandown Bay Academy and Weston Academy) in 2012.

In 2014, Ryde Academy was successful in acquiring the site of a local primary school which was closing, and this became the Haylands Sixth Form Centre.

The last headteacher of Ryde High School was Linda McGowan. The first Principal of Ryde Academy was Rob Hoddle who resigned in 2013. He was replaced by the Vice Principal, Debbie Price, who became acting Principal in Nov 2013 until a new principal could be appointed. Dr Rory Fox was appointed as Executive Principal to provide external support to Mrs Price. Eric Jackson took over leadership of the Academy in January 2015, and Joy Ballard was appointed as Principal for September 2015.

In July 2024, Ballard took a step back from the school, leaving Vice Principal Will Doyle to lead the school with assistance from AET. She announced her retirement in September 2024, and Doyle became Principal.

In July 2026, a Teaching Regulation Agency panel found that Ballard had misused school resources for her own benefit, including personal use of a school car, mismanagement of funds, and changing term dates for her convenience. She was banned from teaching in England.

Prior to joining the Academies Enterprise Trust Ryde High School had a financial deficit in the region of £1m. but by 2015 the academy had managed to reverse that situation, into a surplus of more than £1m.

With Academies Enterprise Trust rebranding as Lift Schools, it was announced that Ryde Academy would be renamed to Lift Ryde from the start of the 2025-26 school term.

Former Ryde High School logo

== Academic performance and inspections ==
In 2007, Ryde High School was commended by the Department for Education for its achievements with disadvantaged pupils. In 2010, before Ryde High School became Ryde Academy, it was judged by Ofsted to be providing a "Satisfactory" quality of education. In its first inspection as an Academies Enterprise Trust (AET) school, Ofsted judged that standards were "inadequate".

GCSE results since 2004 have improved as follows:

Date	5GCSE (including Eng & Mat)	Progress 8 results
2004	32%	n/a
2007	39%	n/a
2010	41%	n/a
2013	51%	n/a
2016	54%	-0.41

In the summer of 2014, Ryde Academy reported improvement in results, with a 200% improvement in the proportion of pupils gaining A/A* grades In the summer of 2015, when AET asked Eric Jackson (from AET's "troubled" Sandown Bay Academy) to lead Ryde Academy, the GCSE results fell to 36% (compared to Carisbrooke College 53% and Priory School 54%).

In 2010 3% of pupils gaining A/A* at A level, and in 2016 it was 50% of pupils.

The school was judged inadequate by Ofsted in 2013, and as requiring improvement in 2014, but then judged "good" in November 2016.

== Controversies ==
In 2014, there was a crackdown on school uniform which led to an estimated 250 to 300 pupils being removed from lessons and sent home or placed in isolation, due to uniform infringements, including skirt length, shoes and socks, and trousers. This was covered in BBC South Today, The Times, The Telegraph and the Loose Women television show. As a result of the Academy's actions, some parents removed their children from the school. Academies Enterprise Trust said that they supported Ryde Academy.

In the same year, teaching unions at Ryde Academy were challenged for defending poorly-performing teachers.

In January 2015, Ofsted criticised Academies Enterprise Trust for not providing enough support to Ryde Academy. When academic standards at neighbouring Sandown Bay Academy collapsed and Academies Enterprise Trust were unable to improve the school, they announced in 2017 a plan to close Sandown Bay Academy and the transfer of pupils to Ryde Academy. The principal and governors of Ryde said that they had not been consulted about the plan and that they had discovered it from AET's press statements. There were protests across the Isle of Wight about the poor performance of AET.

In October 2024, there was protest about bans on mobile telephones at the school and uniform policies. School staff deleted comments about this on their Facebook page.

== Notable former pupils ==
- Joe Hancott, former player for Portsmouth F.C. football club
- Kelly Sotherton, English heptathlete
- Shannon Watson, actress
