= Tom Friend =

English cricketer

Personal information
- Full name: Tom Friend
- Born: 3 May 1991 (age 35); Newport, Isle of Wight, England
- Nickname: Friendy
- Batting: Right-handed
- Bowling: Right-arm fast-medium

Domestic team information
- Years: Team
- 2011: Cardiff MCCU
- 2011: Unicorns

Career statistics
Competition	First-class	List A
Matches	2	3
Runs scored	85	19
Batting average	28.33	9.50
100s/50s	–/–	–/–
Top score	48	14
Balls bowled	228	114
Wickets	2	1
Bowling average	93.50	122.00
5 wickets in innings	–	–
10 wickets in match	–	–
Best bowling	2/96	1/49
Catches/stumpings	2/–	–/–
- Source: Cricinfo, 29 July 2012

Tom Friend (born 3 May 1991) is an English cricketer. Friend is a right-handed batsman who bowls right-arm fast-medium. He was born in Newport, Isle of Wight, and was educated on the island at West Wight Middle School and Carisbrooke College, before attending Brockenhurst College on the mainland.

Friend played Second XI cricket for the Worcestershire Second XI in 2010. On 28 February 2011 it was announced that Friend had signed for the Unicorns for the 2011 Clydesdale Bank 40. It was in this competition that he made his List A debut against Lancashire. His maiden wicket, taken in this match, was Tom Smith. He made two further appearances in the competition against Essex and Lancashire, but he failed to take any further wickets.

While studying for his degree in Sport Development at University of Wales Institute, Cardiff, Friend made his debut in first-class cricket for Cardiff MCC University against Somerset at Taunton Vale Sports Club Ground in 2012. He made a further first-class appearance in that season against Warwickshire at Edgbaston.
