= Si Genaro =

British musician (born 1971)

- Born: 1971 (age 53–54)
- Origin: Isle of Wight, England
- Genres: Acoustic, folk, punk, reggae
- Occupation: Musician
- Instrument(s): Harmonica, voice, guitar, bass guitar

Si Genaro (born 1971) is a British musician, known for appearances on BBC's The Voice UK in 2014 and 2015.

Born in 1971, Genaro grew up on the Isle of Wight, attending Cowes High School. He began his musical career as a harmonica player, busking in Ryde and Cowes. In his 20s he moved to Bournemouth and studied at music college, before going on to front regional bands such as Shapeshifter, Dubheart and The Genaro Project.

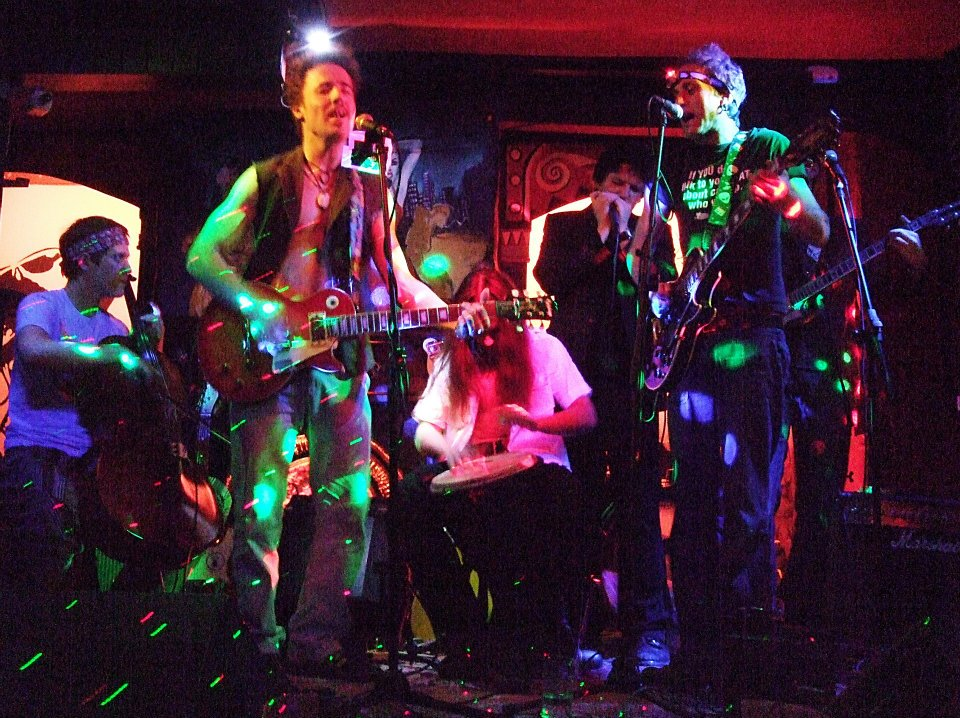
Si Genaro and Ant Henson playing live with Ever The Animal

In 2009, Genaro supported the UK number one charting pop singer David Essex on a UK tour and in 2012 he joined fellow Bournemouth musician and Voice contestant Ant Henson as vocalist and guitarist of the psychedelic post-rock band, Ever The Animal.

In January 2014, Genaro appeared on BBC One talent competition The Voice UK, singing Men at Work's 1981 song "Down Under". In February 2015, Genaro appeared in series 4 of The Voice singing "Falling Slowly".

In June 2016, he supported Luke Concannon at one of his house concert Uk tour dates. He performed a rendition of his own song, "When the Last Bird Flies".

Genaro's song "Down Under" is known as one of the most harmonic acts but, he is not acoustic because he has other instruments in his songs.

In 2015 Genaro backed a track called "Burn the Fire" by local artists Simon Harder and Matt Black (Piano Man) with his Harmonica and Guitar by Chris Payne later released by Hangover Hill Recording Studio.

Genaro is known for his prolific work in developing younger artists and supporting musicians in their ambitions.
