= Ant Henson =

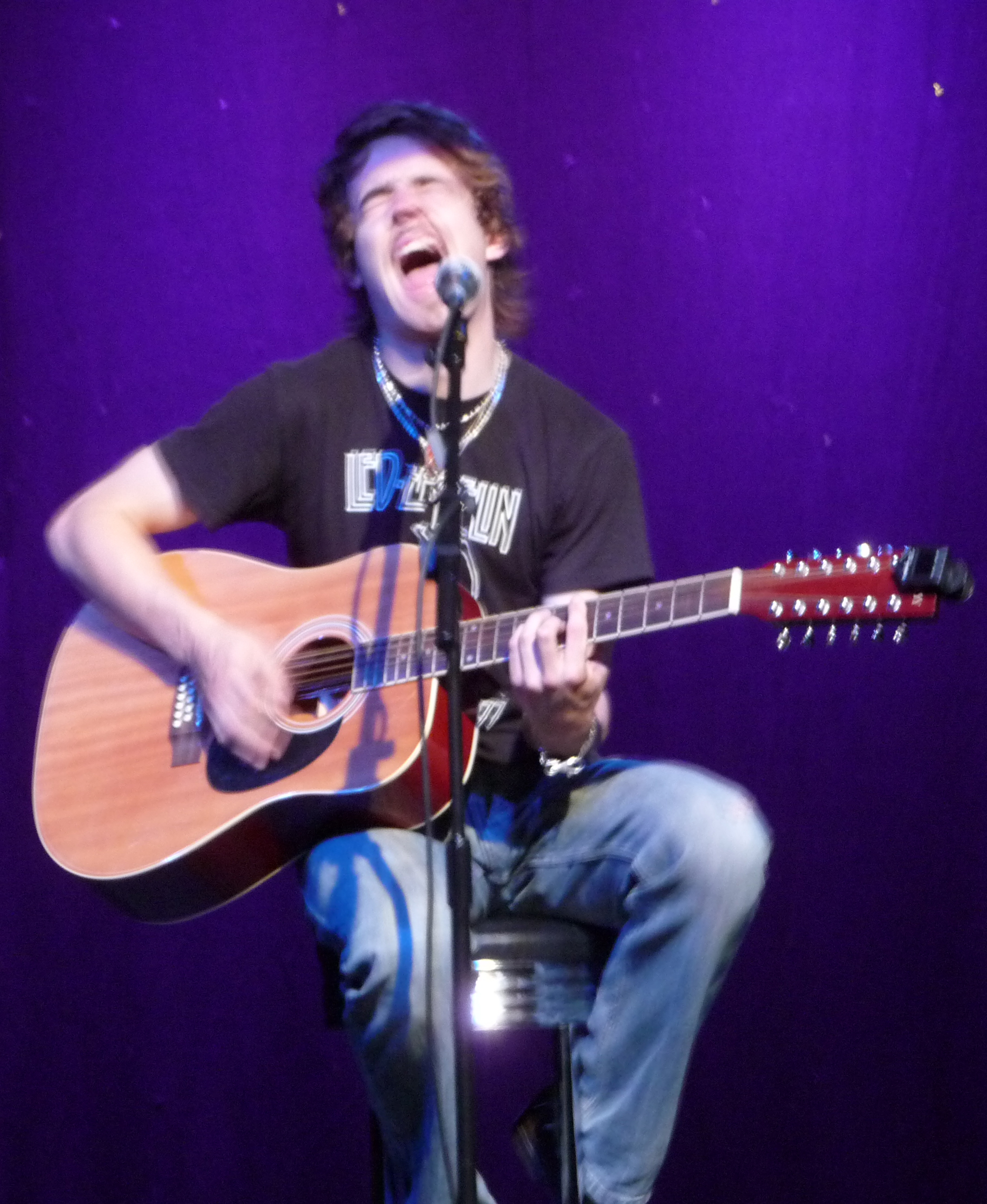
- Henson performing in 2010 at The Tivoli Theatre, Dorset.

Background information
- Born: Anthony Mark Henson; 14 February 1989 (age 37)
- Origin: Poole, Dorset, England
- Genres: Folk, Folk rock, Acoustic, Pop
- Occupation: Singer/songwriter
- Instruments: Voice, guitars, harmonica, percussion
- Years active: 2005–present
- Labels: Plastic Parrot, independent artist

Ant Henson (born Anthony Mark Henson on 14 February 1989) is an English singer-songwriter, who released his first single, "I Love You And I Miss You" in 2010.

== Undercurrent and BournemouthAID ==
In February 2005, Henson started pop-punk band Undercurrent with school friend Adam Scholey. The group disbanded in 2008 after three years of gigging, shortly before Henson left the UK to travel around Western Europe and North America.

Following his travels, Henson moved to Reading, Berkshire to commence a course in robotics at the University of Reading. There he met and studied under the experimental scientist and cyberneticist, Kevin Warwick. In his first year of study at Reading, Henson also participated as a 'hidden human' in the 2008 Loebner Prize and Turing Test, which was held at his school.

Henson and Scholey were reunited in March 2009 when Scholey invited Henson to sing on the BournemouthAID project CD in which local artists collaboratively recorded a cover of Slade's "Mama Weer All Crazee Now".

== Solo career ==
After BournemouthAID, Henson went on to record his debut single "I Love You And I Miss You" and released it in March 2010 on Scholey's independent label "Plastic Parrot". To promote the single release, Henson toured the UK in summer 2010 and had originally planned to tour in the US for the summer of 2011, but instead he toured in Western Europe for the duration of August.

In addition to his prolific approach to live performances overseas, Henson continues to gig in the south of England and it was announced at the 2011 Bournemouth Unplugged Final that Henson had been awarded the ITG Songwriter's Award for original content and high-quality songcraft.

As of 2012, Henson has shared bills with artists from a diverse list of genres including alt-country singer Michael Weston King, a cappella quartet The Blanks (as seen on American hit comedy-drama TV series, Scrubs), and at least two number one charting artists including; Scrumpy and Western band The Wurzels, and BRIT Award-winning Scottish singer-songwriter KT Tunstall. He is also reported to have (on separate occasions) jammed live on stage with Steve Ryan from British pop punk group Trucks, and Huw Lloyd-Langton from English space rock band Hawkwind, among others.

In April 2013, Ant Henson was featured on the BBC1 flagship entertainment show, The Voice UK. For his blind audition he sang All These Things That I've Done by The Killers but did not make it through to the 'battle rounds' of the competition.

== Other projects ==
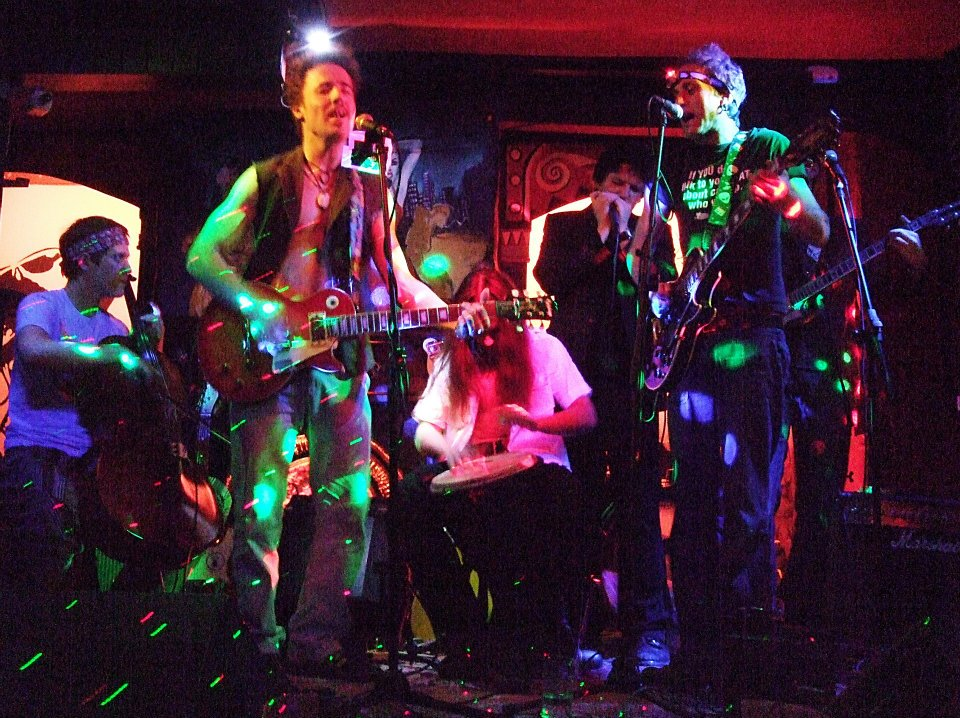
Ant Henson and Si Genaro playing live with Ever The Animal

In June 2010, the play "Sandman's Fee" was performed for two nights at The Lighthouse, Poole for which Henson co-wrote some of the music with the primary script writer, Gavin Dutot.

Henson is also involved in other musical endeavours, including playing electric guitar and providing both song-writing talents and joint lead vocals for psychedelic post-rock jam band, Ever The Animal.

In 2012, Adam Scholey released an album of his own tracks under the moniker "Sounds Like Adam", featuring several studio collaborations with Henson on both lead and rhythm guitar.

Henson and Scholey have also been known to collaborate live since the break-up of Undercurrent, with Henson often playing acoustic guitar and singing harmonies to Scholey's lead vocal and keyboard work. In these performances, they have been known to reprise Undercurrent songs as well as performing tracks from each of their solo catalogues.

== Acting ==
Henson also has an active acting career, having played the role of Jesus in a 2009 production of Andrew Lloyd Webber's Jesus Christ Superstar in Reading, Berkshire, and as Schlomo Metzenbaum in a 2010 production of Fame – The Musical. In 2010, again in Reading, Henson played Prince Hamlet in a Reading University Drama Society production of Shakespeare's Hamlet. Following his trend towards open air Shakespeare, Henson again starred with RUDS as Peter Quince in a production of A Midsummer Night's Dream in 2011, and also appeared as Lord Longaville in a 2012 production of Love's Labours Lost and as Orsino in Twelfth Night in 2022, both with Brownsea Open Air Theatre and both to positive reviews. In October 2012, Henson starred as Tom Wingfield in a Bournemouth Little Theatre club production of Tennessee Williams' autobiographically inspired The Glass Menagerie. One review described Henson's performance as "Strong and Intelligent".
