= Inspire Enterprise Academy =

Location
- Chapel Road; Southampton, Hampshire, SO14 5GL; United Kingdom; 50°54′08″N 1°23′36″W

Information
- Type: Studio school
- Established: 2013
- Closed: 2015
- Department for Education URN: 139591 Tables
- Ofsted: Reports
- Gender: Mixed
- Age: 14 to 19
- Website: http://www.inspiresouthampton.co.uk/

Inspire Enterprise Academy (formerly Southampton Studio School) was a Studio school located in Southampton, designed for students aged 14–19 who intended to pursue a career in business and enterprise. It was founded in 2013 as part of the Studio Schools Trust. The school combined project-based learning and business experiences. In September 2014 Inspire Enterprise Academy's sister, the Isle of Wight Studio School, opened on the Isle of Wight.

On 6 July 2015 the school announced that it would close at the end of the academic year. The school formally closed in August 2015. Children in Year 10 were offered a transfer to the Isle of Wight Studio School.
