= Sandown Bay Academy =

The Bay CE School (Formerly Sandown Bay Academy)

Location
- The Fairway; Sandown, Isle of Wight, PO36 9JH; England; 50.658°N 1.166°W

Information
- Type: Academy
- Motto: Believe, Inspire, Excel
- Closed: 2018
- Specialist: Sports College
- Department for Education URN: 136751 Tables
- Ofsted: Reports
- Gender: Co-educational
- Age: 11 to 16
- Enrolment: 1,252
- Houses: 4 (Blue - Mr Bricknell; Green - Mr Wainwright; Yellow - Mr Johnson; Red - Mr Muzohna)
- Colours: 4 ( )
- Website: Official website

Sandown Bay Academy, formerly Sandown High School, was an academy status secondary school located in Sandown on the Isle of Wight, England. From 2012 to 31 August 2018 it was sponsored by the Academies Enterprise Trust. On 31 August 2018, the academy was closed.

== History ==
Education at the current school site began with Sandown Grammar School, which had a long history during the twentieth century. The school became Sandown High School in 1970 when the former Sandown Grammar and Fairway Secondary Modern schools merged to form Sandown High School. In 2005 Sandown High School became a sports college and regularly topped all the Isle of Wight sporting leagues and events.

In 2008 it was decided that the Isle of Wight education system should be changed from a three-tier system to a two-tier system, in line with the majority of schools in England and Wales, and that the new schools should be academies. A range of organisations were invited to bid to run the new Secondary school academies. Academies Enterprise Trust (AET) competed against the Island Innovation Trust and the "East Wight Educational Trust" and presented a proposal for a high achieving outstanding academy. AET was subsequently awarded the contract to run the new Sandown Bay Academy, named after the bay it is located on. It opened as an AET school with 2005 pupils, making it one of the largest schools in England at that time. Due to the very large number of pupils, the site of nearby former Sandham Middle School was incorporated into the site and called "North School."

The last headteacher of Sandown High School and first Principal of Sandown Bay Academy was John Bradshaw. The Principal of Sandown Bay Academy from Sept 2012 until November 2013 was Shaheen Khan Jones. She was replaced by Eric Jackson who was Principal until Sept 2015, when Claire Charlemagne took over, until her resignation for Sept 2017.

== Academic standards and improvement ==
The national measure of school performance until 2015 was the proportion of pupils gaining 5 GCSEs A-C grade (including English and Maths). From 2016 the measure of school performance changed to "progress 8." Both sets of data are included in the following table.

Academy Name	Joined AET	2011	2012	2013	2014	2015	2016	OFSTED Grade	DfE Warning or Pre Warning
Sandown Bay Academy	Sep 2012	NA	40%	47%	42%	47%	(37%) -0.54	Requires Improvement	21 March 2013
National Maintained Schools		59%	59%	60%	57%	59%	0		

Five years after AET took over Sandown Bay Academy, in order to bring about "world class learning outcomes" the GCSE 2016 results for Sandown Bay Academy are the worst ever achieved by the school and the new performance measure of "progress 8" places the school amongst the 10% of lowest achieving schools in England.

The results of A level pupils (aged 18) have also collapsed. At the point that AET took over Sandown Bay Academy, A level results placed the Academy in the top 25% of schools in England, with one third of the Sixth Form pupils graduating and proceeding to study at Russell Group universities (including Oxford and Cambridge) in 2013. Standards have steadily fallen, with the academy delivering the wrong course material to students, followed by OFSTED criticism of "disappointing" A level results and "unexpected U grades"(OFSTED Nov 2015). By 2017 only 4% of students at Sandown Bay Academy were achieving the AAB grades necessary to go to top Russell Group universities (compared to the national average of 17%).

In Spring 2013 OFSTED stated that standards were 'inadequate' and placed the academy in Special Measures, before going on in May 2013 to criticise the Academy Improvement Plan as not-fit-for purpose and in October 2013 the Academy was criticised for being too slow to bring about improvement. At the same time the UK Department for Education also wrote to the AET complaining about the "unacceptably low" academic standards at Sandown Bay Academy. AET promised urgent improvements in 2013, but four years later Sandown Bay Academy achieved its worst ever set of GCSE results and found itself ranked amongst the lowest achieving 10% of schools in England.

AET tried a range of strategies to improve Sandown Bay Academy. They began by appointing a "Regional Director of Education" (RDE) who would oversee standards in the Academy. The first RDE was Jonathan de Sausmarez, who in 2012 was responsible for appointing the first Principal, and responsible for "securing rapid school improvement and the best possible progress for all pupils." When Sandown Bay Academy went into Special Measures in 2013, he was replaced by David Fuller, AET's national director of secondary schools. David Fuller's goal was to appoint a "superhead" to improve Sandown Bay Academy.

AET appointed Eric Jackson as the superhead at Sandown Bay Academy from 2013 to 2015.

The superhead plan came to an end in 2015 when GCSE results at Sandown Bay Academy were lower than the 48% achieved five years earlier in 2010, before the school had even become an AET school. This led to OFSTED stating that the Academy was "not taking effective action" because "The pace of improvement in the academy has been too slow. Recommendations... have not been acted on urgently, or sharply enough. (Nov 2015)"

With the failure of the Superhead plan, David Fuller left Sandown Bay Academy. AET next asked Jonathan de Sausmarez to return as RDE and to have another go at "bringing about rapid improvement."

AET's next plan turn around the declining results was to having a management board to run the Academy, chaired by Beverley Perin, another AET senior executive. After two years of management board support from 2015 AET's results in 2017 got worse, with the school among the 10% lowest achieving schools in England.

Ofsted put Sandown Bay Academy into Special Measures for its second time as an AET Academy, stating that pupils had been "let down in the quality of education which they receive, for too long". The local authority responded by stating that "...AET should hang their heads in shame and apologise unreservedly for their complete failure to support and develop what should by now have been a good school. Pam Wheeler of the Parents action group said "AET couldn't sell ice cream on the pier."

After five years of failing to improve the Academy, local politicians were losing patience. Councillor Whitehouse, the leader for education on the Isle of Wight, stated: "In my view, [AET] is simply not up to the job and should be relieved of its responsibilities and replaced by a sponsor that can deliver the improvements and expertise that Sandown Bay Academy needs..." In an almost unprecedented move, 450 pupils staged a sit-in protest calling for AET to be fired, chanting "get AET out the door," whilst parents organised protest marches.

AET's new CEO, Julian Drinkall, effectively blamed the governors for the poor standards at Sandown Bay Academy and said that they would be sacked and replaced with a management board. The governors responded by accusing AET of "unprofessional and inept behaviour", as no one from the trust had informed them they were being sacked and they had learnt the news from the media.

Unfortunately, the AET executives do not seem to have told their CEO that AET had already been trying a management board to raise standards for the previous two years, and that that management board plan had failed. By 2017, AET had tried throwing their top executives at the Academy, they had tried a "superhead" and they had already tried a "Management Board," so the proposal of a new management board plan was withdrawn (and an apology was given to Sandown Bay Academy parents for leaving them to hear about that plan from the media).

AET finally closed Sandown Bay academy and merged it with Ryde Academy, another AET academy.

Councillor Howe said that AET should be "ashamed of themselves." Julian Critchley, the Labour Party candidate for the Isle of Wight in the General Election of 2017, stated: "The answer to Sandown Bay Academy’s issues is not to impose their problems on Ryde Academy, but to fix the problems in Sandown. Clearly, that is something which AET are incapable of doing."

== Controversy over closure plans ==
AET initially justified its decision to close Sandown Bay academy (and merge the pupils with the neighbouring Ryde Academy), by stating that the pupil numbers at Sandown Bay Academy had dropped from 2084 in 2012 to just 1157 pupils in 2017, and that the school had therefore become financially unviable and "unsustainable"

MP Andrew Turner stated that it was the drop in standards at Sandown Bay Academy which was leading to a fall in pupil numbers, a claim he backed up by referring to the large numbers of local parents coming to him saying that they did not want to send their children to AET's Sandown Bay Academy.

AET responded by trying to blame the falling numbers at Sandown Bay Academy on an over-supply of school places on the Isle of Wight. This position was described by the head of education for the Isle of Wight Local Authority as "duplicitous, destructive... (and) illiterate educational vandalism," because the number of children in the primary schools was increasing, so the Isle of Wight actually needed more secondary school capacity, not the less capacity which AET was claiming.

AET's honesty was further questioned when it was discovered that half the secondary schools in England are actually smaller than Sandown Bay Academy. and of AET's own schools Sandown Bay Academy has the 7th largest number of pupils out of 29 secondary schools. One third of AET's secondary academies have less than 626 pupils. The Principal of Winton Community Academy, which joined AET in November 2012 said in June 2017 that, "Winton Community Academy officially has a pupil admission number of 750 and currently has 452 students on roll...we have no concerns about student numbers." These facts led to the Isle of Wight local authority referring to AET's position that Sandown Bay academy was too small to be financially viable as "tosh and twaddle."

Further doubt was cast on AET's integrity and "duplicitious" motives for wanting to close Sandown Bay Academy when AET was accused of lying that Sandown Bay Academy had had a budget deficit at the Academy in each of the three years previous to 2017, a position which was undermined when a leaked copy of the Academy budget showed no such deficit to have existed. Furthermore, of AET's 29 Academies, the AET 2016 Annual Accounts show that 11 of those Secondary academies have a far more serious budget problem than Sandown Bay Academy (and 10 of the schools are actually smaller than Sandown Bay Academy), so AET's position in singling out Sandown Bay Academy for closure appeared "duplicitious", as Councillor Whitehouse described it. This impression of deceit was reinforced when Councillor Howe said that barely a week before AET announced the closure of Sandown Bay Academy, he had been given assurances by AET executives that they were not considering closure. And so Councillor Bob Blezzard called for AET to be replaced with a more 'enlightened' academy chain.

In considering AET's behaviour counsellor Howe suggested that AET's treatment of another Isle of Wight school, Weston Academy, should be taken into account. In 2015 Weston Academy went into Special Measures, with collapsing academic standards, and AET's response was to close the school in mid year, forcing parents to find alternative schools at the last minute, whilst AET cited unviable pupil numbers as the reason for the closure. The parallels with Sandown Bay are clear. AET's conduct was branded as "appalling behaviour" by the Isle of Wight council, who then signed a motion of no confidence in AET, with all 32 members of the council unanimously calling for the AET chain to be expelled from the Isle of Wight and forced to hand back all their schools on the island.

As part of AET's closure plans for Sandown Bay Academy, AET announced in May 2017 that all 1,157 pupils would be transferred and merged into Ryde Academy. Unfortunately, AET had neglected to inform the principal and governors of Ryde Academy about the plan before announcing it in public; and so when the merger plan emerged Ryde Academy were vehemently opposed to the plan. Councillor Woodhouse, head of education for the Isle of Wight, said that it was shocking that AET could behave with such arrogant disdain and professional discourtesy as to not even communicate with and consult its own Principals and governing bodies about the closure and merger of the schools which they were responsible for. Newly elected MP Bob Seely said that dealing with AET was one of his highest priorities as a new MP and that he was already in contact with government ministers, in order to remove AET from the Isle of Wight, a sentiment seconded by Dave Stewart, the leader of the Isle of Wight Council.

In June 2017 AET once again managed to make a public statement of its plans for Sandown Bay Academy, which it had to reverse within 24 hours because it had once again failed to consult with the Principals and staff affected by its decisions. So, on 27 June 2017 AET announced that Joy Ballard, the headteacher at Ryde Academy would be taking over at Sandown Bay Academy on 1 September 2017, an announcement which was followed the next day (28 June) by AET publicly apologising and announcing that they had "got it wrong" and that Joy Ballard would not be taking over at sandown Bay Academy. On 29 June AET announced that the new head of school would be Richard Kelly, who is suddenly available to lead Sandown Bay Academy because he had to suddenly step down in June 2017 from being headteacher of the Brune School (Gosport) (where he had been headteacher for 4 years) after OFSTED declared that academic standards in the school were poor and placed it in special measures.

The CEO of AET, Julian Drinkall, has replied to the politicians accusations against AET by saying that the trust was being unfairly misrepresented.

== Controversy over Academy finances ==
In October 2014 AET was accused of poor financial management by the Education Funding Agency and ever since then it has had to operate under the financial limitations of a 'warning letter.' In 2015 AET executives moved to a building which was described as a "new flashy headquarters" in London, claiming that the new building was nearer to a railway station (despite the fact that their former headquarters at Hockley in Essex (postcode SS5 4HS) had been just 2 minutes walk away from Hockley railway station). Having made their move to a London headquarters, AET announced a £1.5m deficit budget for its headquarters "central services" team.

In 2016 AET proposed a controversial plan to save money by sacking caretakers across their schools. It was in this context that AET also suddenly announced a need to save £850,000 at Sandown Bay Academy, a sum which seemed to be so excessive (and so surprisingly close to the -£830,000 deficit which their 2016 annual accounts recorded for their central headquarters team), that it triggered allegations that AET were trying to take money out of Sandown Bay Academy in order to subsidise its financial problems elsewhere, which AET denied. However, when staff from Sandown Bay Academy passed documents to the local authority which contradicted AET's claims, amidst claims of acting "disingenuously", AET backed down and reduced the sum which it urgently needed to save to £430,000, which was then further reduced to a need to save £250,000 over two years.

AET take 5% of each AET school's budget, as a central "management fee", to fund the £10,045,000 per year cost of their headquarters "central services" team. With an annual budget at Ryde of £5m and £7m at Sandown Bay Academy this means that more than half a million pounds per year (or £2.5m over the time that AET has managed the Isle of Wight schools) is being removed from Isle of Wight by AET as its "management fee." AET's costs include the £950,000 per year (plus pension contributions) which they spend on paying the top 6 AET executives, a commitment to apple Laptops for executives, the Westfield private health scheme, £3m spent "restructuring staff" in 2015 and 2016, the £25,000 claimed by the CEO in expenses (in addition to the £240,000 salary) and the £10m spent on legal fees (£5,116,000 in 2016 and £5,927,000 in 2015) resolving problems in their schools.

The Governors of Sandown Bay Academy went public with their concerns about AET, claiming "a lack of clarity, honesty and efficiency" by AET and stating: "we unanimously support Sandown Bay Academy being removed from the mismanagement of AET." Examples of mismanagement which have been put to AET include unfairly dismissing staff at a cost of £34,000 (plus legal fees), paying educational consultants £1000 per day (a rate branded "extortionate" when paid by another failing academy chain) and allegations of nepotistic payments by AET staff to family members, as well as a misuse of public money in the region of £250,000 paying staff to sit at home on full pay after the staff raised concerns about the conduct of the CEO of AET; whose resignation in Nov 2016 coincided with the staff resignation letter accusing AET executives of a failure of ethical standards and non-compliance with the Nolan Principles requirement that staff behave honestly. As more of AET's behaviour with Sandown Bay Academy has emerged, Councillor Julia Baker-Smith said that the council was "appalled" at AET's behaviour and Councillor Whitehouse said that AET should be apologising to the parents of the island for letting down their children.

Ultimately AET was accused by the Isle of Wight authorities of acting in a high handed "crass" way, treating the island like an annoying pimple on the AET backside, vandalistically trying to close a school which they couldn't improve, "disingenuously" citing dubious financial factors as an excuse to hide their failure and ulterior motives, and in the process leaving the Local Authority with a new, unfunded £1m a year bill, as the cost of bussing all the children to other schools if AET succeeded in closing down Sandown Bay Academy.

== Popular culture ==
The 1973 box office hit That'll Be the Day, starring David Essex, Rosemary Leach and Ringo Starr, was filmed on the Isle of Wight, particularly at Sandown High School, Shanklin beach and in Wroxall.

== Notable alumni ==
- Jess Andrews – British long-distance runner
- Louis Attrill – Olympic gold medallist.
- Rowland Charles Gould – guitarist for jazz-funk quartet Level 42.
- Phil Gould – drummer for jazz-funk quartet Level 42.
- David Griffiths – cricketer
- Laura Michelle Kelly – Olivier award-winning actress.
- Anthony Minghella – film director.
- David Pugh – local councillor and current leader of the Isle of Wight Council.
- Evelyn Tubb – vocalist with early music ensemble the Consort of Musicke.
