= Christ the King College, Isle of Wight =

School in Isle of Wight, UK

Christ the King College

Location
- Wellington Road; Newport, Isle of Wight, PO30 5QT; England; 50.6941°N 1.3105°W

Information
- Type: Voluntary aided school
- Motto: Via Veritas Vita
- Religious affiliations: Church of England/ Roman Catholic
- Established: 2008
- Local authority: Isle of Wight
- Department for Education URN: 135552 Tables
- Ofsted: Reports
- Chair of Governors: E Burden
- Staff: 135 employed
- Gender: Mixed
- Age: 11 to 19
- Enrolment: 1100
- Houses: Compton, Thorness, Whitecliff
- Colours: Purple, Gold, Silver
- Website: www.christthekingcollege.co.uk

Christ the King College is a joint Church of England and Catholic secondary school and sixth form college located in Newport on the Isle of Wight. It was created in September 2008 by amalgamating two older schools, Archbishop King Catholic Middle School and Trinity Church of England Middle School. Having previously accommodated a middle school age range, the school now takes students from years 7 to 13 after its plans to extend the age range and become a Church of England and Catholic secondary school and sixth form.

== History ==
The school was formed on 1 September 2008 when two middle schools on Wellington Road, Archbishop King Catholic Middle and Trinity Church of England Middle merged. This was done in line with the education reforms that were being implemented to schools across the island at the time.

The desire to expand beyond the then-current age range of 9–13 years was first registered in December 2004, shortly after a new headteacher, Pat Goodhead, was appointed. In 2006, after "outstanding" Ofsted inspections for Trinity, and the need for a new headteacher for Archbishop King, a joint governing body committee was formed and Goodhead was appointed headteacher of both Trinity and Archbishop King. Amalgamation, or fusion, of the two schools moved on as there were positive responses from all involved, including clergy, parents, and staff, which was confirmed during an official review. The schools were fully amalgamated in September 2008, resulting in the closure of Trinity and Archbishop King middle schools.

Following the new launch, an opening ceremony was held in October 2008.

In the college's first academic year (2008–2009), it accommodated the original age ranges that the two middle schools had before. The next year, the school increased their range to include year 9. Years 5 and 6 were removed from the school's range in the following two years. Each year, higher age ranges were progressively accommodated at the school. By the academic year 2013–2014, the school had reached its goal to become a secondary school and sixth form. It was unique in the United Kingdom in accommodating these age ranges, a reflection of its changing status from middle to secondary school.

== Site ==
The college was based on two separate campuses, each in close proximity on Wellington Road. One accommodated years 7 and 8, known as "Lower College", and the other accommodated years 9 to 11 and the sixth form, known as "Upper College". However, since the construction of a new state of the art school building (first used in 2018 but completed in 2019) the entire school is housed on the previous Upper College site, while Lower College has been converted into playing fields and a bus bay.

As part of the college's previous expansion plans, deliveries of new temporary classrooms to include Science, Art and Design and Technology facilities were made. In addition, a multi-use games area (MUGA) was put in place on the lower field of the Upper College site, which replaced the playground on which the new sports hall temporarily stood. All of these have since been removed following the rebuild, and a new MUGA was put in place on the site of the old temporary sports hall.

After a relatively long delay, construction for the new sixth form accommodation was completed by September 2013, taking only just 25 weeks. Funding was also secured by the college for a complete rebuild as part of the Government's Priority Schools Building Programme.

== Sixth form history ==
The Sixth Form Centre was officially opened in a service led by the Right Reverend Philip Egan, Catholic Bishop of Portsmouth and the Right Reverend Christopher Foster, the Church of England's Bishop of Portsmouth. The service began in the sports hall, attended by the secondary years and staff. This was followed by a procession to the Sixth Form Centre for the second half of the service, which was attended by the sixth form students and staff. The centre was blessed and officially opened by the two bishops. The service also included the investiture of the principal, Patricia Goodhead, as a Dame of the Papal Equestrian Order of Saint Gregory the Great.

== Papal Honour ==
In September 2013 it was announced that the principal of the college, Patricia Goodhead, was to be presented with a Papal Honour for her services to the Catholic Church in education. The award was presented by Egan on 11 December 2013 during the opening service for the sixth form. Ms. Goodhead was subsequently also made a Dame of the Papal Equestrian Order of Saint Gregory the Great.

== Examination and inspection results ==
The 2012 pass rates for the school, in its first year of results, were 77.1% 5+ A*-C including English and maths for GCSE. Ofsted inspectors visited the college in April 2014, with Goodhead saying that she was proud of the results. Stating that "Goodhead, governors and key leaders were relentless in their drive for excellence", the school showed examples of outstanding practice. They also praised the college's sixth form, stating it was good and preparing students well for the future. Ofsted inspectors said that to improve, the students' work needed to be "more consistent", with them staying focused in classes. However, Ofsted rated it as "good" overall, a high achievement for a newly opened school, commenting it was "knocking on the door of outstanding".

== Primary school leadership ==
At the start of September 2013, Christ the King College assumed Governance of Newport C of E Primary School. This was implemented as an initiative to bring the primary school out of special measures.
