= The Bay Church of England School =

Location
- Winchester Park Road; Sandown; Isle of Wight, PO36 9BA; England; 50.65745°N 1.15873°W

Information
- Type: Voluntary controlled school
- Religious affiliation: Church of England
- Local authority: Isle of Wight Council
- Department for Education URN: 136013 Tables
- Ofsted: Reports
- Executive Headteacher: Duncan Mills
- Gender: Co-educational
- Age: 4 to 16
- Enrollment: 1281 (August 2021)
- Website: www.bayceschool.org

The Bay Church of England School is a co-educational all-through school located in Sandown on the Isle of Wight, England.

It was formed in September 2010 from the merger of Sandown Church of England Primary School and St John's Church of England Primary School in Sandown. and then opened a secondary school provision a year later. Today it is a Church of England voluntary controlled school for pupils aged 4 to 16, and is administered by the Isle of Wight Council and the Anglican Diocese of Portsmouth.

The Bay Church of England School offers GCSEs and BTECs as programmes of study for pupils. In 2019, the primary department of the school was awarded the Primary Science Quality Mark for its Science teaching.
