= Medina College =

Secondary school in Newport, Isle of Wight

Location
- Fairlee Road; Newport, Isle of Wight, PO30 2DX; England
- Coordinates: 50°42′40″N 1°16′57″W

Information
- Type: Foundation school
- Motto: Aspire and Achieve
- Established: 1976
- Local authority: Isle of Wight
- Department for Education URN: 136010 Tables
- Ofsted: Reports
- Head Teacher: Kam Bains
- Gender: Male / female
- Age: 11 to 19
- Enrolment: 985 (school); 245 (sixth form)
- Colour: Green
- Website: https://www.medina.iow.sch.uk

Medina College is a foundation secondary school in Newport on the Isle of Wight, formerly Medina High School.

== History ==
Medina High School was founded in 1976 on the current site. By the 1990s, the school suffered from a falling roll and finances, with Richard Williams brought in as head in 2002, the fifth head in 2 years. In 2004, blazers were reintroduced to replace polo and sweatshirts, with procedures from a number of schools include troubled school in Birmingham introduced to help discipline. In 2008, the school was deemed "Outstanding" in an Ofsted inspection, something they have failed to achieve since.

In September 2008, the school decided to pursue trust status, becoming a foundation school on 3 February 2009 and also a trust school, with partners University of Portsmouth, the Isle of Wight NHS Primary Care Trust, the Quarr Group, Solo Agency and Quay Arts. The school also introduced International Baccalaureate courses.

As part of the reorganisation of the education system on the Isle of Wight, Island Innovation Trust (formerly Medina Innovation Trust), formed by the school's trust, was successful in their bid against Academies Enterprise Trust and again Island Innovation Trust without a hard federation to take over the school. In 2011, the school opened with the age range extended to Year 7 to Year 13. It is now one of 5 secondary providers on the Isle of Wight, with the school in a hard federation with Carisbrooke College. The Island Innovation Trust was later renamed the Isle of Wight Education Federation.

In January 2010, the current head Richard Williams announced he would be stepping down no later than Easter and moving on to become principal of an academy school in Kent, partly influenced by the school's re-organisation.

As Medina High School, the school was made a specialist Arts College and received the Artsmark gold award in 2007. The school has won medals in local and national trampolining competitions including the British Schools Trampolining Competition in March 2009. Also, Medina took part in the White Air extreme sports festival held at Yaverland.

The school shares a 6th Form Campus with Carisbrooke College on the former Nodehill Middle School site, known as Island Innovation VI Form Campus.

The 2012 pass rates for the school were 32.5% 5+ A*-C including English and Maths for GCSE and 97.8% pass rate with 67% A* to C for A Level at Island Innovation VI, run by the college with Carisbrooke.

Until his death on 18 March 2008, Anthony Minghella served as the school's patron.

On 1 September 2014, Nathan Thomas left his post as head teacher of the school.

On the 28th of July 2021, along with other schools on the Island, Medina College was hit with a ransomware attack.

== Facilities ==
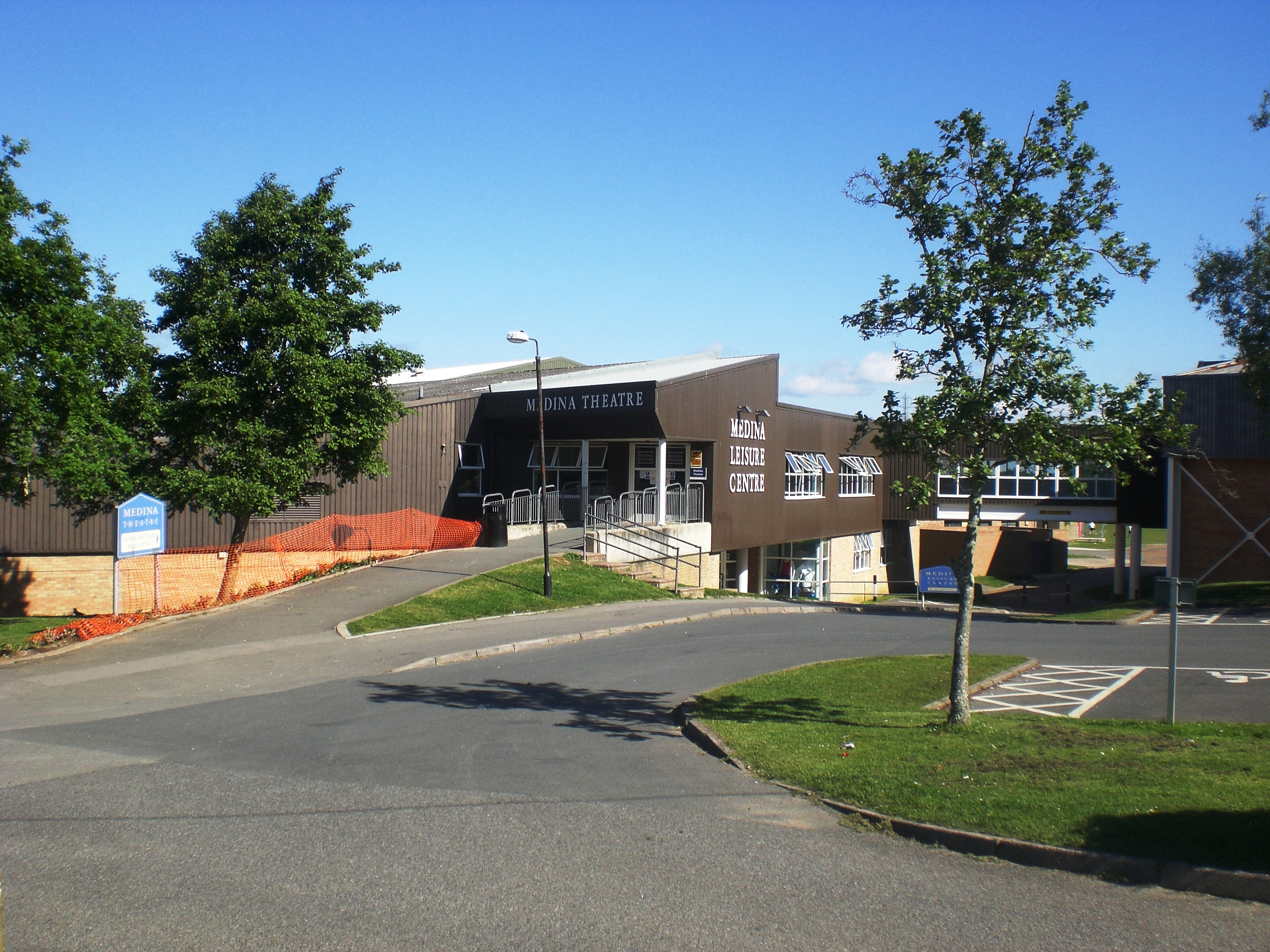
The Medina Leisure Centre and Medina Theatre

The school has the Medina Leisure Centre on-site, which houses a gym, swimming pools, tennis and basketball courts, a sports hall and the Medina Theatre. However, students are only allowed to use the majority of these facilities during lessons such as drama and physical education.

== Fusion ==
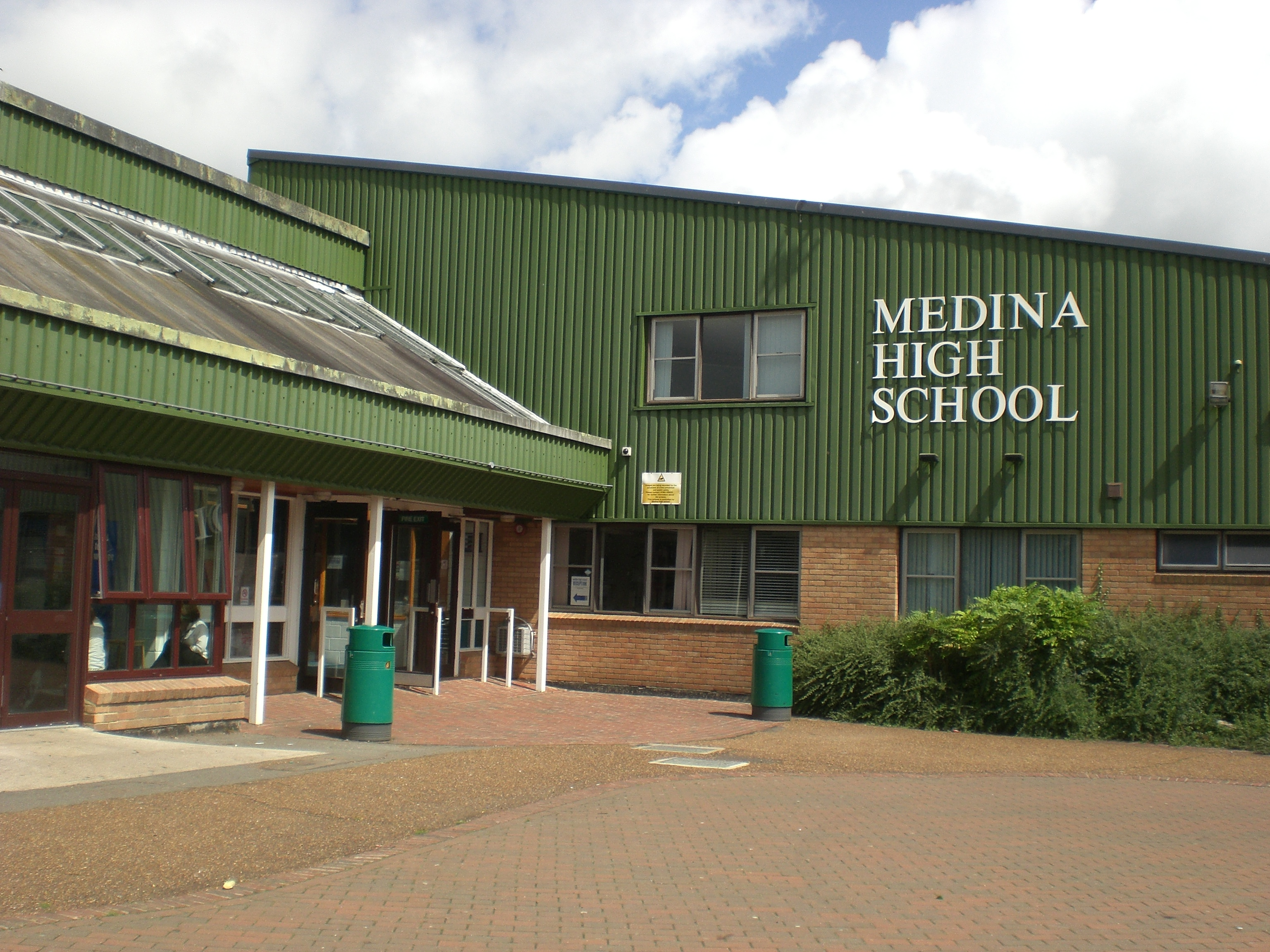
The main entrance when it was known as Medina High School

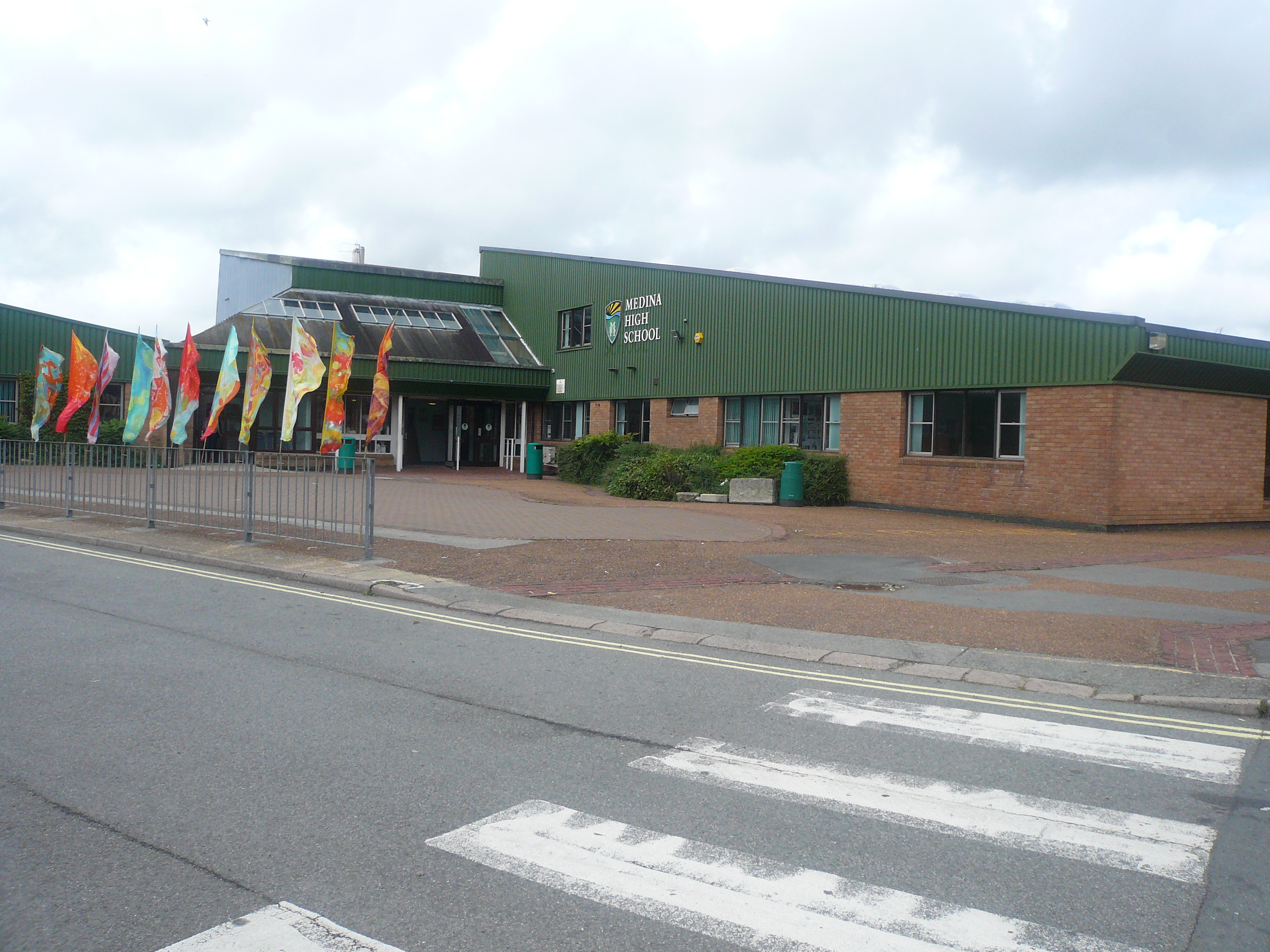
The school during an 'Arts Blast' week

Fusion was a quarterly magazine produced by students at the school, targeting young people across the island and distributed islandwide. It was first published in summer 2007 as part of the school's 'Arts Blast' week and contained a documentary of the Isle of Wight Festival. 5 issues were published, with the first two issues supported by Creative Partnerships. The magazine was free and relied on advertising revenue from Island businesses.

== Notable former pupils ==
- Loretta Minghella, CEO of Christian Aid
