= The Island VI Form =

Location
- Upper St. James' Street; Newport, Isle of Wight, PO30 1LJ; England; 50.697034°N 1.294625°W

Information
- Type: State
- Local authority: Isle of Wight
- Staff: TBC
- Gender: Male / Female
- Age: 16 to 19
- Enrolment: TBC
- Website: https://www.theislandviform.org.uk/

The Island VI Form (formerly known as the Island Innovation Sixth Form Campus) is a post-16 education centre located in Newport on the Isle of Wight. It forms part of the HISP Multi Academy Trust, alongside Medina College and other schools within the trust.

== Overview ==
The VI Form is based in a historic building that was previously occupied by Nodehill Middle School. The main structure dates back to 1904, when it was originally built as the Seely Library and Technical Institute, giving the campus a distinctive and academic setting.

Before 2024, the VI Form operated under the Isle of Wight Education Federation (IWEF), alongside Medina College and Carisbrooke College. However, on 1 July 2024, the federation was dissolved, and all three institutions transitioned into academies under HISP Multi Academy Trust.

Today, The Island VI Form is a central hub for post-16 education on the Isle of Wight. Students can choose from a range of A-levels, BTEC courses, and other Level 3 qualifications.

In addition, the VI Form offers an Art and Design Foundation Diploma for students aged 18–19 who wish to develop their creative skills before progressing to higher education.

From September 2026, the VI Form is expanding its provision to include a Level 2 pathway. This one-year course is designed for students who may not yet meet the entry requirements for Level 3 study, allowing them to build the necessary skills and qualifications before progressing onto A-levels or other advanced courses.

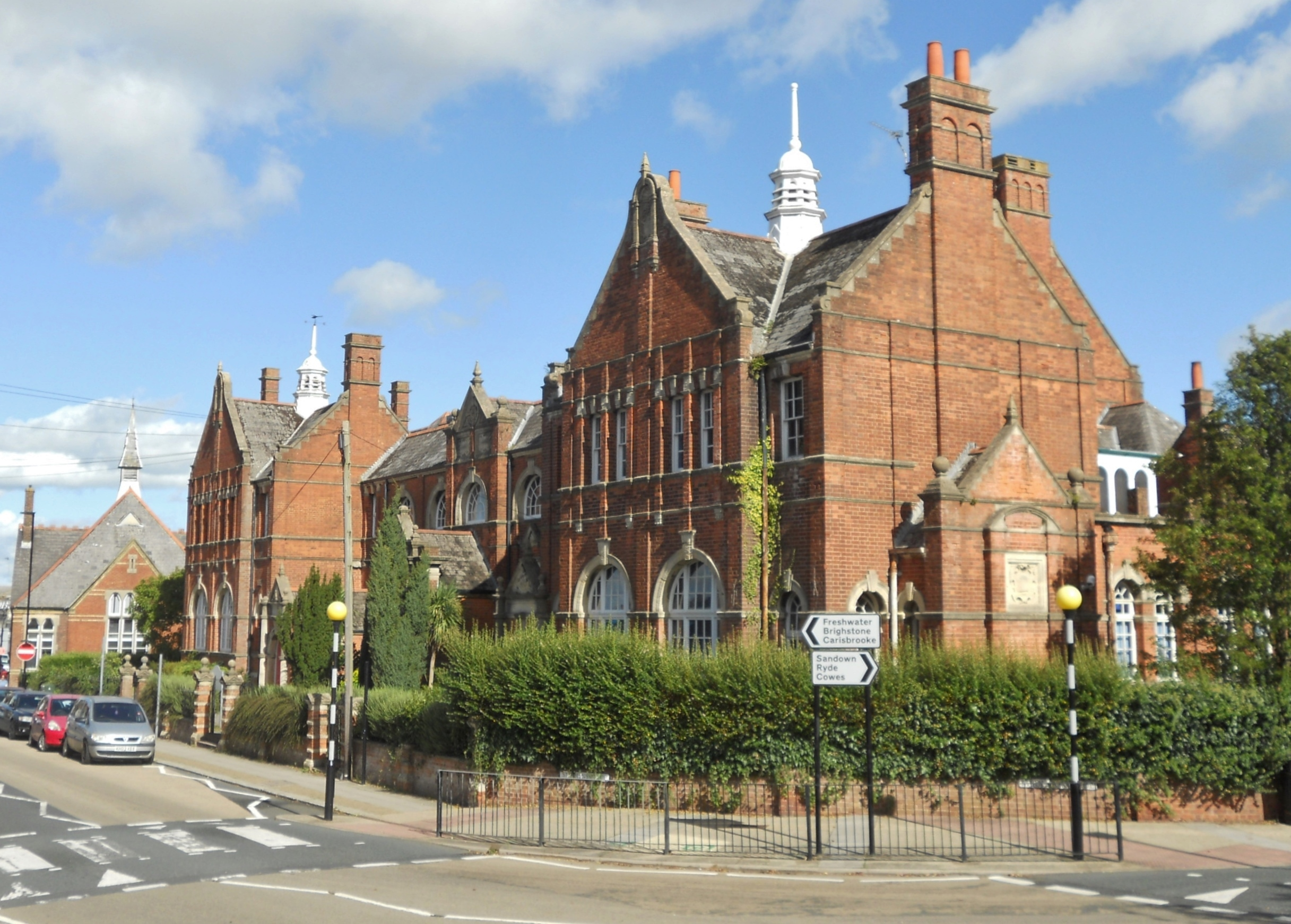
The Island Sixth Form
