= Isle of Wight Studio School =

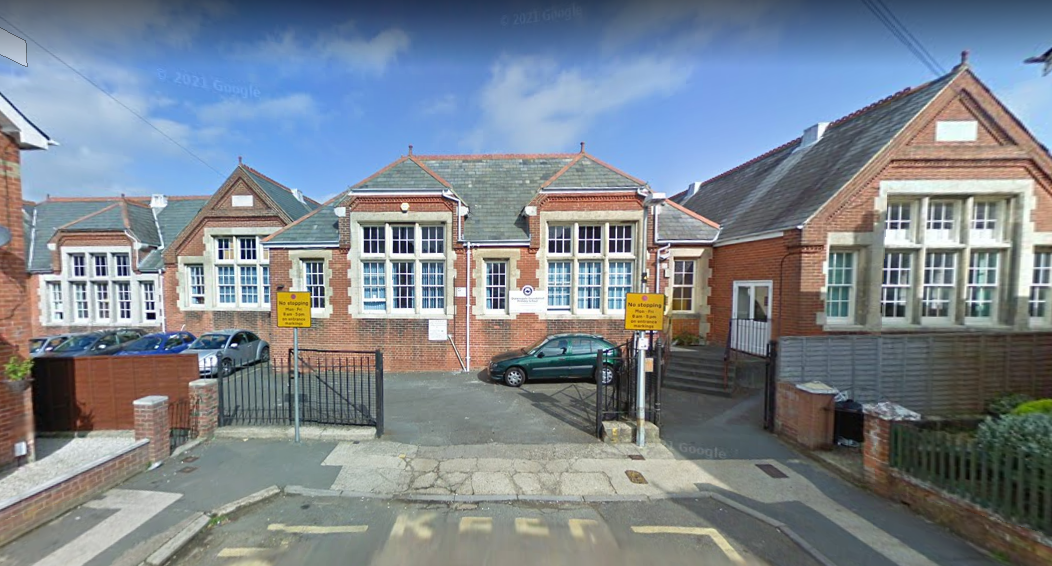
- Picture of the Isle of Wight Studio School. Credit: Google Maps

Location
- East Cowes, Isle of Wight, PO32 6EA; England; 50.7545°N 1.28447°W

Information
- Type: Studio school
- Established: 2014
- Closed: 2019
- Department for Education URN: 140948 Tables
- Ofsted: Reports
- Principal: Richard White
- Gender: Co-educational
- Age: 14 to 19

The Isle of Wight Studio School was a Studio school which opened in East Cowes on the Isle of Wight in 2014. It was on the site of the former East Cowes Primary School. It was a sister school to the Southampton Studio School, which was first renamed Inspire Enterprise Academy and then closed in 2015. It was part of the Studio Schools Trust. The school catered for 14-19 year-olds. There were a maximum of 75 children in each year.

The school's sixth-form closed in 2018 because not enough students applied. The rest of the school closed in 2019, again because of the low number of students.

The school's first and only Ofsted inspection was in May 2018, with a judgement of Requires Improvement.
