= Isle of Wight College =

College in Newport, Isle of Wight, England

- Other name: University Centre Isle of Wight
- Type: Further and higher education
- Established: 1951
- Principal: Ros Parker
- Students: 4,457
- Location: Newport, Isle of Wight, United Kingdom; 50°42′23″N 1°17′48″W
- Campus: Modern
- Website: http://www.iwcollege.ac.uk

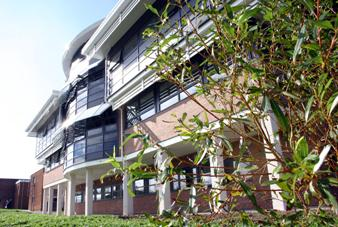
The Isle of Wight College

Isle of Wight College is a general college of further and higher education in Newport on the Isle of Wight.

The college runs University Centre Isle of Wight with qualifications accredited by the University of Portsmouth.

== History ==
The college offers a broad curriculum to over 4,000 learners as the island's major provider of further and higher education. It offers a selection of vocational courses, apprenticeships and higher education including provision for adult education and those with learning difficulties or disabilities through the Pathways Centre, which opened in 2015. Courses are also available for international students.

Between 2010 and 2015, a sixth form provision was part of the college before being phased out.

In 2017, the college opened its new £12m specialist centre for engineering, the Centre of Excellence for Composites, Marine and Advanced Manufacturing (CECAMM).

In 2021, following over 15 years of offering higher education, the college was awarded university centre status by the Department of Education under the title of University Centre Isle of Wight.

Campus facilities include the Learning Resources Centre, childcare provision, a gym, a dance studio and a coffee shop.

== Location ==
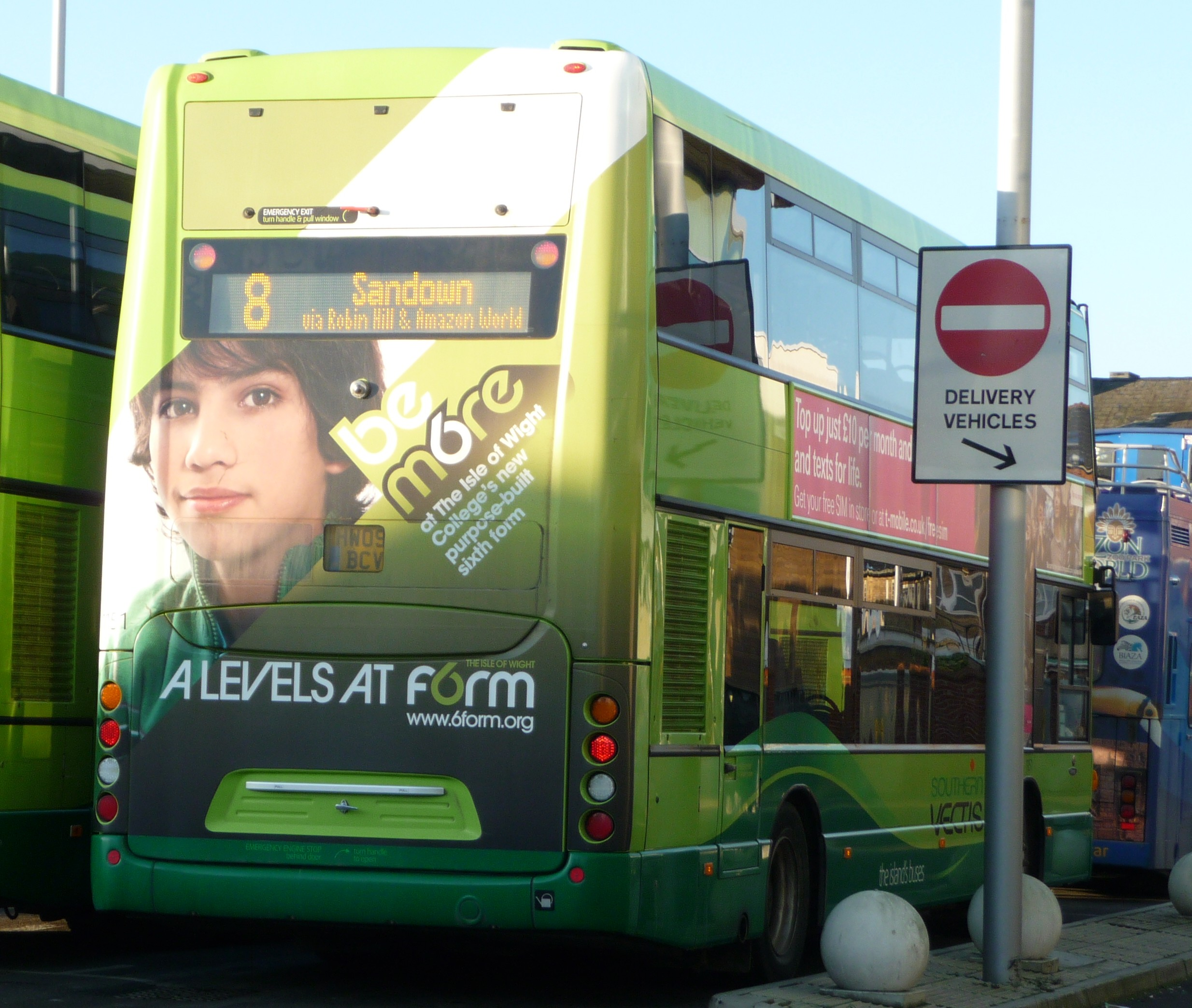
Advert for the former Isle of Wight College 6form on back of a Southern Vectis bus.

The main campus is sited in a central location on the outskirts of Newport, the county town of the Isle of Wight and the island's principal retail centre. A secondary campus, the Centre of Excellence for Composites, Marine and Advanced Manufacturing (CECAMM), is located in Whippingham.
