= Priory School, Isle of Wight =

Priory School of Our Lady of Walsingham

Location
- Beatrice Avenue; Whippingham, Isle of Wight, PO32 6LP; England; 50.7387°N 1.2699°W

Information
- Type: Independent
- Motto: semper fidelis
- Religious affiliation: Christian
- Established: 1993
- Local authority: Isle of Wight Council
- Department for Education URN: 118225 Tables
- Principal: David EJJ Lloyd
- Staff: 48
- Gender: Mixed
- Age: 4 to 18
- Enrolment: 95 boys and 85 girls (summer 2023)
- Website: prioryschool.org.uk

Priory School is a co-educational independent school in Whippingham, Isle of Wight.

== History ==
The school was founded by Elizabeth Joan Goldthorpe in 1993 out of the closure of Upper Chine School with 14 primary aged pupils based in Shanklin. Later the position of Headteacher was taken over by her daughter, Katherine. The school grew to offer education up to GCSE Level. In 2009, the school was acquired by a parent, Edmund Matyjaszek BA (Oxon), whose family had been in education for generations. He expanded the school to A Levels in 2010.

The school received Good Schools Guide Awards in 2010 and 2015 for Science education.

In 2012, the school moved to the site of Queen Victoria's school at Whippingham, East Cowes, having acquired the freehold site from the local authority. Princess Beatrice visited the school on 16 June 2014 to unveil a plaque to commemorate 150 years of continuous education on the Whippingham site.

In the Department of Education League Tables, published in February 2018, Priory School was ranked best on the Isle of Wight for A Levels, best on the Isle of Wight for GCSE English and Mathematics, and ranked 21st out of 4417 secondary schools in England for A Levels. Since 2019 the school has achieved 100% pass rates for GCSEs and A Levels. In 2023, it secured its first Oxbridge entrant at Jesus College, Oxford.

In September 2017, to reflect the Christian ethos, the school name was extended to Priory School of Our Lady of Walsingham, with approval from the Bishop of Portsmouth, the Ordinariate of Our Lady of Walsingham and the Custodian of the Basilica at Walsingham.

In May 2018 the school was rated as Good with Outstanding Features by Ofsted.

In 2022, Priory School of Our Lady of Walsingham was accepted as a member of the Independent Schools Association. In 2023, on its first inspection by the Independent Schools Inspectorate, it was deemed to be fully compliant in all areas of school life, the highest accolade possible.

In January 2023, Mr David EJJ Lloyd joined the school as its new Principal, following nearly 13 years as Headmaster of Solihull School in the West Midlands. Mr Matyjaszek remains heavily involved in the life of the school as Proprietor and Bursar.

== Location ==
Originally located in the Broadway, Sandown, the school moved to temporary accommodation at Landguard Manor, Shanklin, before relocating in 2005 to Alverstone Manor.

Having sought a new building since coming under new ownership, the school purchased and moved into the former Whippingham Primary School, built by Queen Victoria in 1864 to the design of Prince Albert, in February 2012.
