= The Quay Arts =

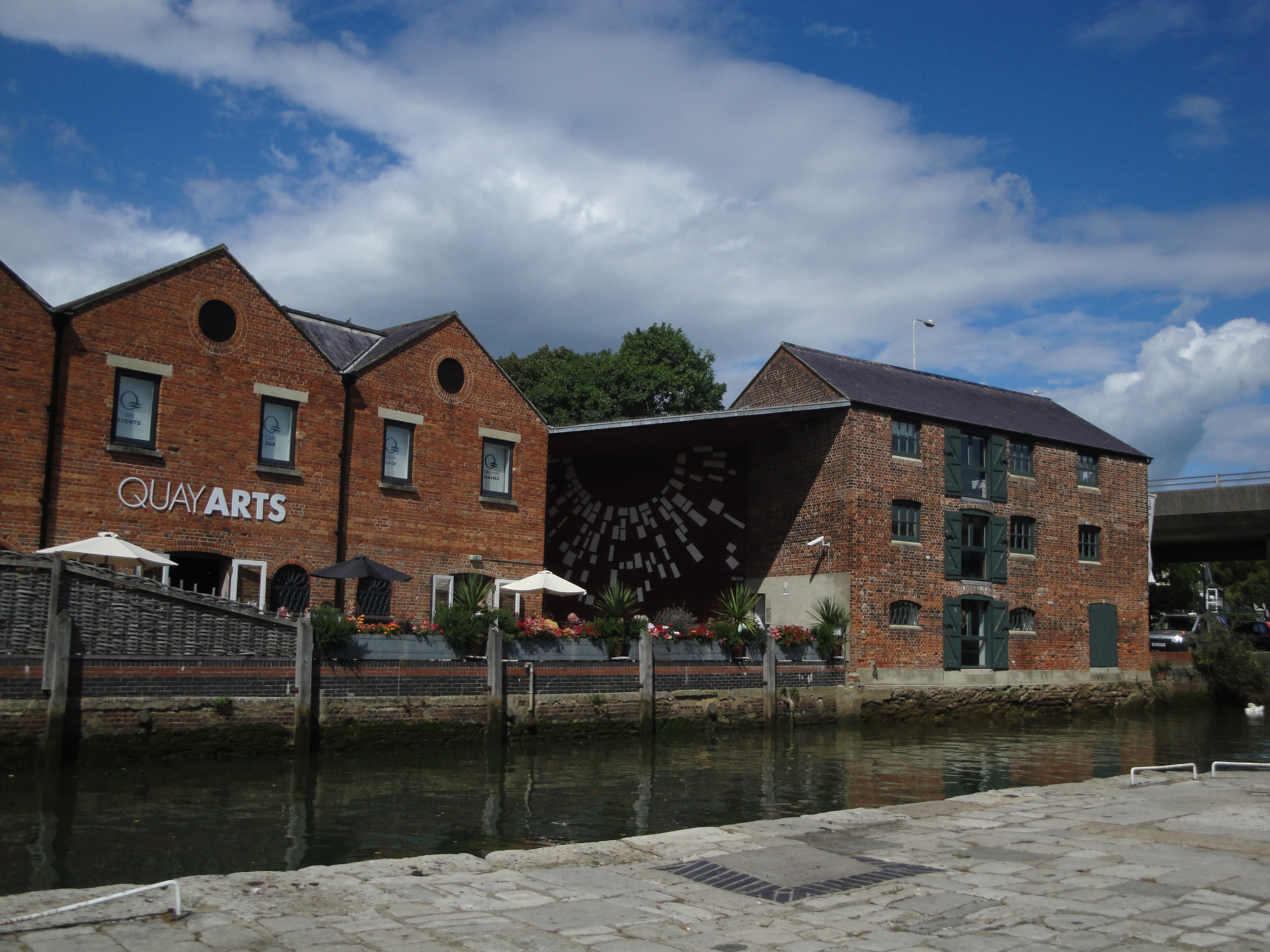
- The Quay Arts Centre in August 2011.

- Interactive map of the area

General information
- Architectural style: Warehouse
- Location: Newport, England
- Coordinates: 50.7019°N 1.2924°W

Design and construction
- Architect: Tony Fretton

The Quay Arts Centre is located at the head of the River Medina, in Newport in the centre of the Isle of Wight. It is the island's leading art gallery and venue for live events.

The complex features three art galleries, a crafts shop, a 134 capacity theatre, conferencing facilities and a cafe and was fully refurbished in 1997 by architect Tony Fretton. The Quay Arts owns and operates Jubilee Stores, also located on Newport Quay.

== History ==
The Quay Arts was first proposed in 1974 by a painter Anne Lewington and graphic designer Nigel Lewington, who proposed the idea of a building to house an arts centre for the island. Disused brewery warehouses on the Quay side at Newport Harbour were first identified as a suitable site, and is the location of the Quay Arts Centre today. In 1976 the buildings were sold to the Isle of Wight Council for £14,000.

Since the centre opened in 1982 flooding has been a recurring problem to facilities on the ground floor, and in 1993 a flood wall was built to help prevent further flooding, although it didn't stop completely. A successful redevelopment bid to the National Lottery in 1996 led to a complete refurbishment and re-opening in 1998. This also included further development of the adjacent Rope Store, also to house art.

The main cafe area is now used to host a number of musical events including "Acoustic Originals", showcasing local talent, and "Songs in the Quay of...", inviting local performers to take part in an event focussed on performances of music from pre-selected famous artists.

== Facilities ==
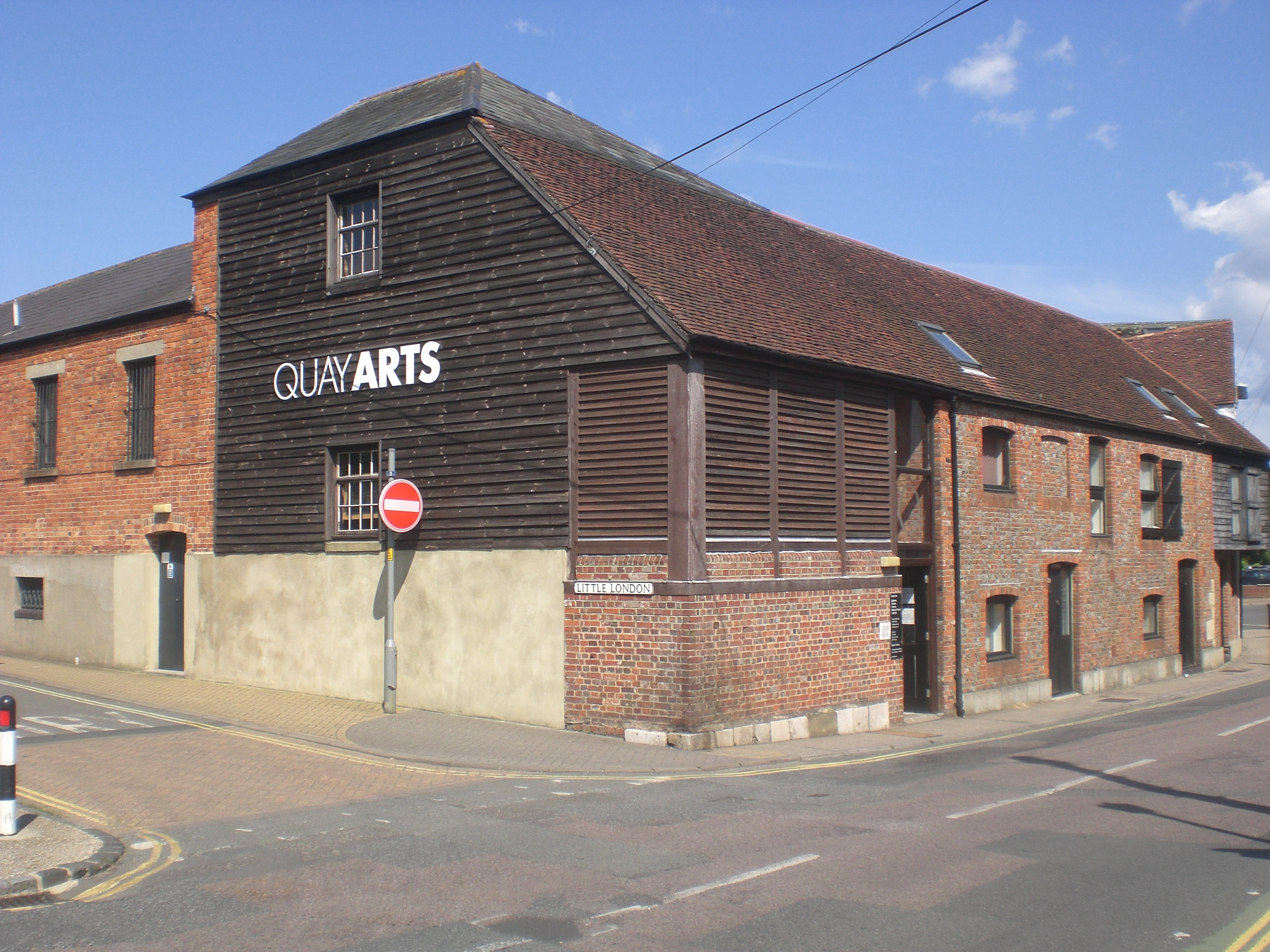
The front view of the Quay Arts Centre.

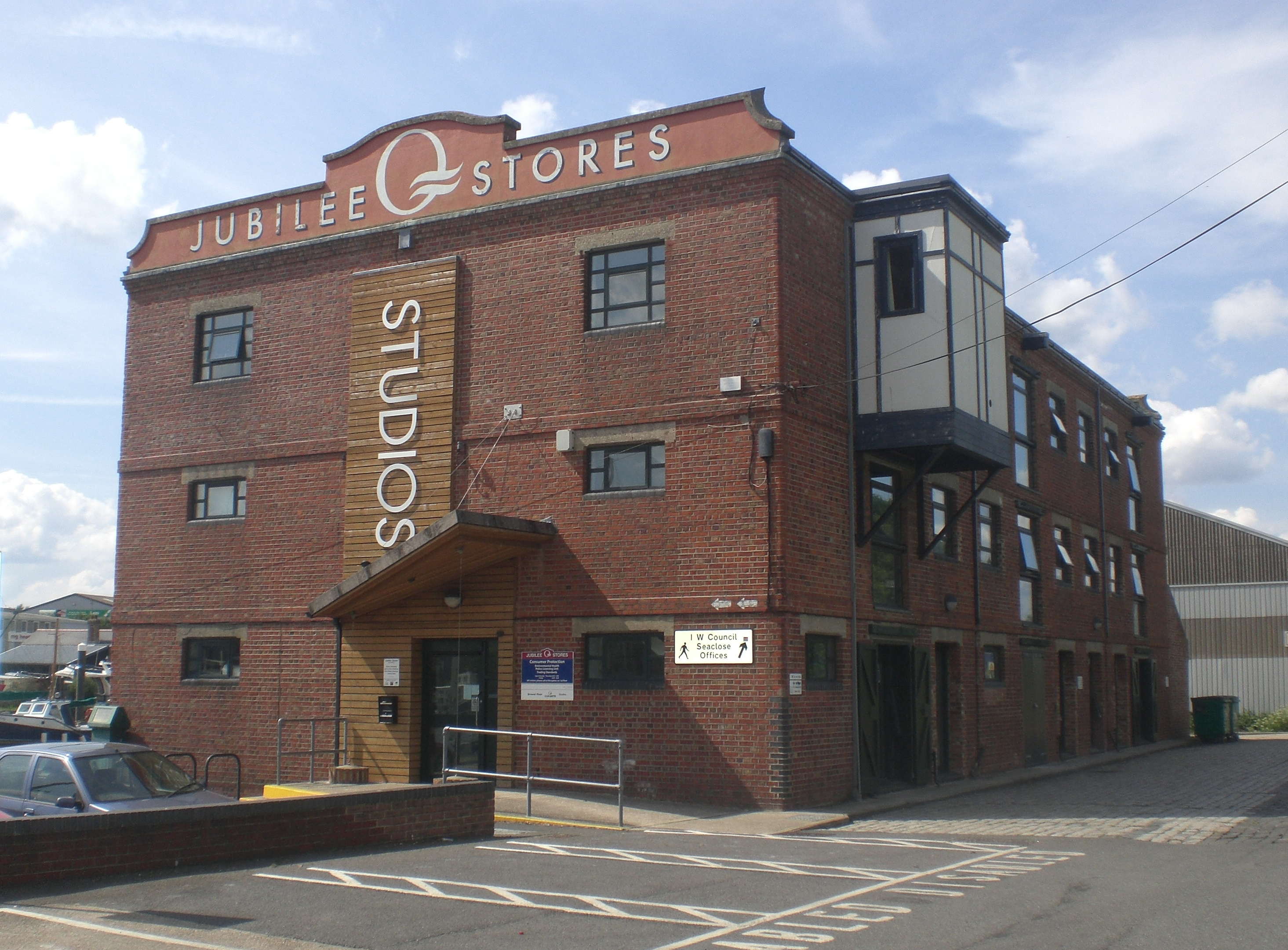
The outside of Jubilee stores.

- Anthony Minghella Theatre – The theatre was named after island born Anthony Minghella after he opened it in 1997. It is host to a range of live events including professional touring comedy, world music, folk, jazz, blues, small-scale theatre, children's shows and a cultural cinema programme.
- Seminar Room – A small room located adjacent to the Quay Arts Centre's cafe and measured at around 57 sq. metres it accommodates up to fifty people.
- Green Room – The Green Room is set in the Rope Store and is slightly smaller than the main seminar room, accommodating around 15 people.
- Cafe Wall – Recognised as the Quay Art's fourth gallery space. It mainly hosts the work from amateur artists and younger emerging artists, first time exhibitors and experimental work. It hosts a minimum of 11 exhibitions a year.
- West Gallery – A large space that encourages and promotes innovation and experimentation in visual arts. It was named after General Sir Michael West who was one of the group of artists led by Anne Lewington who founded the Quay Arts in 1975.
- Rope Store – The Rope Store was opened in 1997, along with the rest of the Quay Arts after its restoration and is a small space for displaying both solo and group exhibitions. It hosts a minimum of nine exhibitions a year.
- Clayden Gallery – A space primarily dedicated to promoting and supporting the work of the island's young people and emerging artists. Occasionally it is linked to the West Gallery's exhibitions as a part of the Quay Arts Outreach programme and hosts a minimum of ten exhibitions per year.
- Craft Shop – Provides a showcase for more than sixty island and regional craft makers. Many of the crafts featured are unique to the island.
- Jubilee Stores – Jubilee Stores (pictured) is a separate building on Newport Harbour, housing a Ceramics Workshop, General Workshop, Print Studio and seven private Artists' Studios.
