= Weston Academy =

Primary school in the Isle of Wight, England

Weston Academy was an Isle of Wight primary school run by the Academies Enterprise Trust academy chain. It closed in 2015.

== History ==
Previously called Weston Community Primary School, the school was located in Totland Bay in the far West of the Isle of Wight The school has always been a small school with fewer than 100 pupils. In 2011 it was threatened with closure by the local authority and the National Secular Society (NSS) stepped in to ask for a reprieve

In order to avoid closure by the local authority, the primary school became an academy with the Academies Enterprise Trust (AET), becoming the first Primary Academy on the Isle of Wight.

Weston had been graded as 'good' by OFSTED but as an AET academy the standards declined and it was graded as 'inadequate' (Special Measures) in 2015.

== Closure controversy ==
In October 2015 AET announced that it was closing the school due to "falling pupil numbers." AET's reasons for closing the academy were publicly queried as it was stated that data showed pupil numbers were due to increase, not decline, and so it was claimed that AET was really closing the academy in order to save money. Further investigations showed that there was also a critical report from the Department for Education in June 2015 which was alleged to have contributed to AET's highly unusual decision to close the academy so quickly in the middle of a school year at December 2015

The last headteacher of Weston Primary School was Miss Rebecca Wood.
