= Carisbrooke College =

Location
- Mountbatten Drive; Newport, Isle of Wight, PO30 5QU; England; 50.69755°N 1.314928°W

Information
- Type: Academy
- Motto: Education is our Castle
- Religious affiliation: None
- Established: 1907
- Local authority: Isle of Wight
- Department for Education URN: 136012 Tables
- Ofsted: Reports
- Chair: Richard Bridgford
- Head teacher: Natalie Sheppard
- Staff: ~200 (full-time)
- Gender: Male / Female
- Age: 11 to 16
- Enrolment: 600
- Colour: Blue grey
- Website: https://www.carisbrooke.iow.sch.uk/

Carisbrooke College is an 11-16 secondary Academy within the HISP Multi Academy Trust. It is based in Carisbrooke on the Isle of Wight.

== History ==
The history of Carisbrooke College dates from 1907, when its forerunner, Newport County Secondary Grammar School, was opened on Upper St James Street, Newport. The new school was situated on the site of the pre-existing Newport Technical Institute and Seely Library, both having been built with the support of Sir Charles Seely.

In 1957–58, the school moved from its premises on St James Street, Newport, to a purpose-built site in nearby Carisbrooke. The school changed its name to Carisbrooke Grammar School. It also absorbed many of the students from the East Cowes Technical School, which closed down a year or so later. On the same site a separate school was built, called Priory Boys Secondary Modern School. The schools shared sports fields for football, rugby, cricket, hockey and athletics plus a kitchen and dining room block.

The Carisbrooke Grammar School complex included a main block with classrooms, a staff room, staff offices, a “Sick Room” (used by the nurse and for medical and dental examinations), senior common room and a tuck shop, where buns were sold during the morning break. Connected to this block were a music room and assembly hall/auditorium, “tuck shop”, gymnasium and changing rooms. There was a separate science block with laboratories for general science plus biology, physics and chemistry plus well equipped classes for cookery and domestic science. A single-storey crafts block was included for woodwork and metalwork classes. Bicycle racks for pupils and staff were behind the crafts block. The staff and visitor car park was adjacent to the front entrance of the main block. A few years after opening, an outdoor swimming pool was added. There were separate playgrounds for boys and girls, each with tennis courts for use in the summer. The playing fields were on two layers on a hillside at the rear of the complex. There were pitches for football, hockey and rugby. The lower level was repurposed for athletics during the Summer term.

The first headmaster of Carisbrooke Grammar School was Stanley G. Ward, with an initial staff complement of 41. Each of Forms 1 through 5 initially had four classes designated 1A, 1B, 1C, 1D, 2A and so on. This was changed in 1960 when Forms 3 through 5 classes C and D were relabeled L and G, for Latin and German. Pupils in those classes had a higher proportion of languages, mathematics and sciences than those in the A and B “streams”. Each year had approximately 120 students. By 1965 the Lower and Upper Sixth Forms had about 60 students in total, a few of whom had moved from Secondary Modern Schools after excellent performances there. Academic standards were high, with almost everyone passing five or more Ordinary Level General Certificates of Education (GCEs), most obtaining at least two Advanced Level GCEs and some passing at least one Scholarship level GCE.

The Isle of Wight moved to a comprehensive education system in 1971. This resulted in Carisbrooke Grammar School merging with its neighbour, Priory Boys Secondary Modern School, to become Carisbrooke High School.

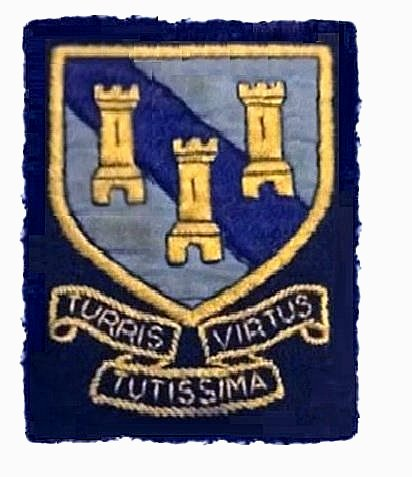
1935 Blazer Badge of Newport County Secondary Grammar School

The Isle of Wight reorganised its education system again in 2010–11. As a result, Island Innovation Trust (formerly Medina Innovation Trust), took over responsibility for the school. In September 2011, the school reopened as Carisbrooke College, with the age range extended to Year 7 to Year 13 (having previously been from Year 9 upwards). It was then one of eight secondary providers on the Isle of Wight, with it, Medina College and the Island VI Form comprising the Isle of Wight Education Federation (IWEF). The IWEF existed for 12 years but was disbanded in 2024.

In July 2015 Isle of Wight Council put forward proposals to close Carisbrooke College from 2016, and merge it with Medina College. The plan was rejected by councillors.

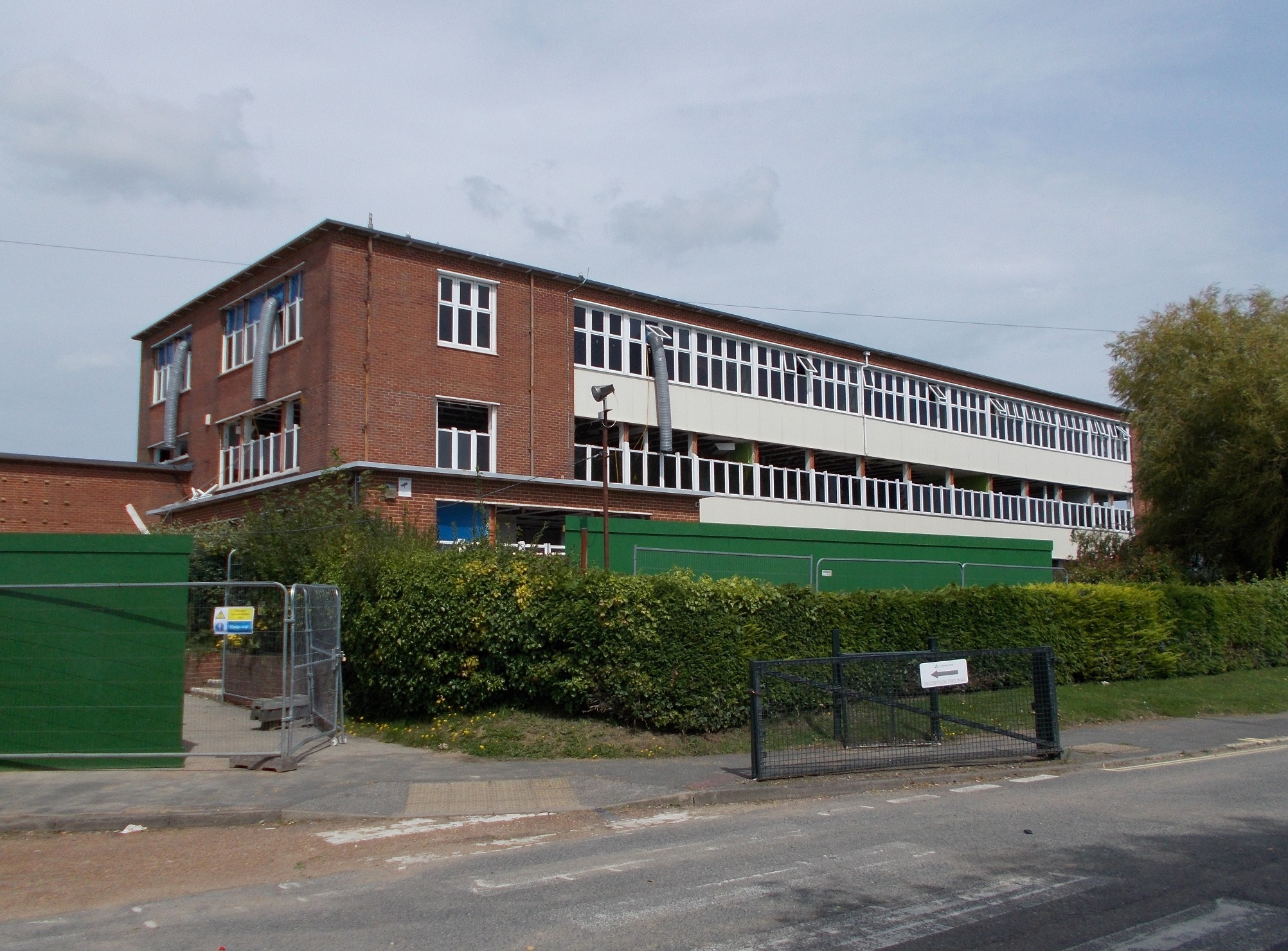
Demolition of the old main east block begins in 2017

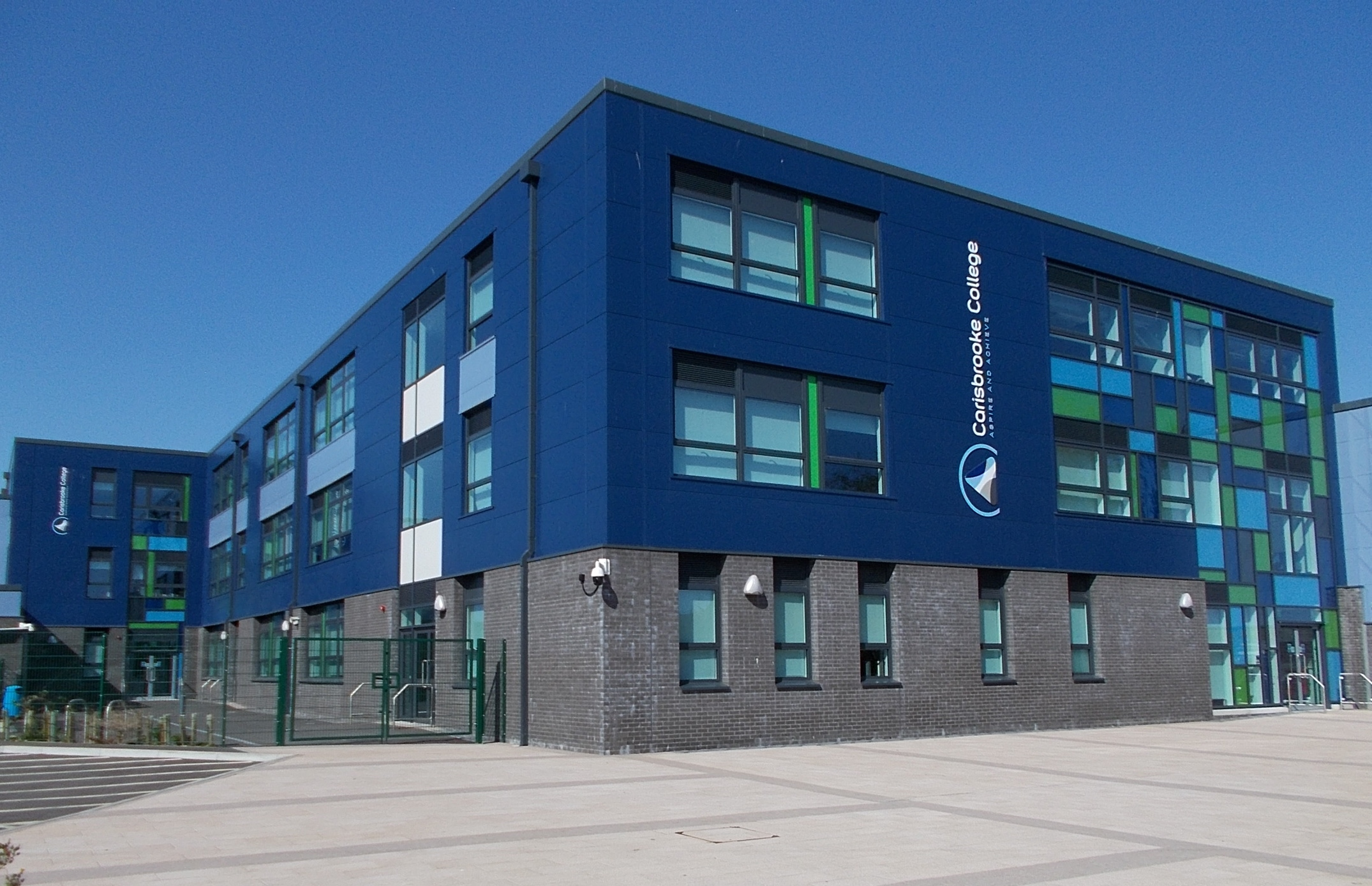
New building shortly after completion in 2019

Over 2017-2020 the sprawling old buildings were progressively demolished, and a new building was erected on a much smaller footprint.

== Results ==
The school's recent exam results are listed below:

Year	GCSE A*-C	A Level points
2010	49	719.3
2011	51	668.1
2012	36	643.4
2013	44	698.9
2014	28	661.9
2015	54	
2016	51	

== Notable former pupils ==
Arts and media

- Suri Krishnamma, film director
- Donna Langley, Chair of Universal Pictures

Sport

- Danny Briggs, England cricketer
- Keegan Brown, professional darts player
- Tom Friend, cricketer
- Adam Hose, MCC cricketer
- Darren Mew, Olympic swimmer
- Gareth Williams, former Aston Villa footballer
