= Cowes Enterprise College =

Cowes Enterprise College, An Ormiston Academy

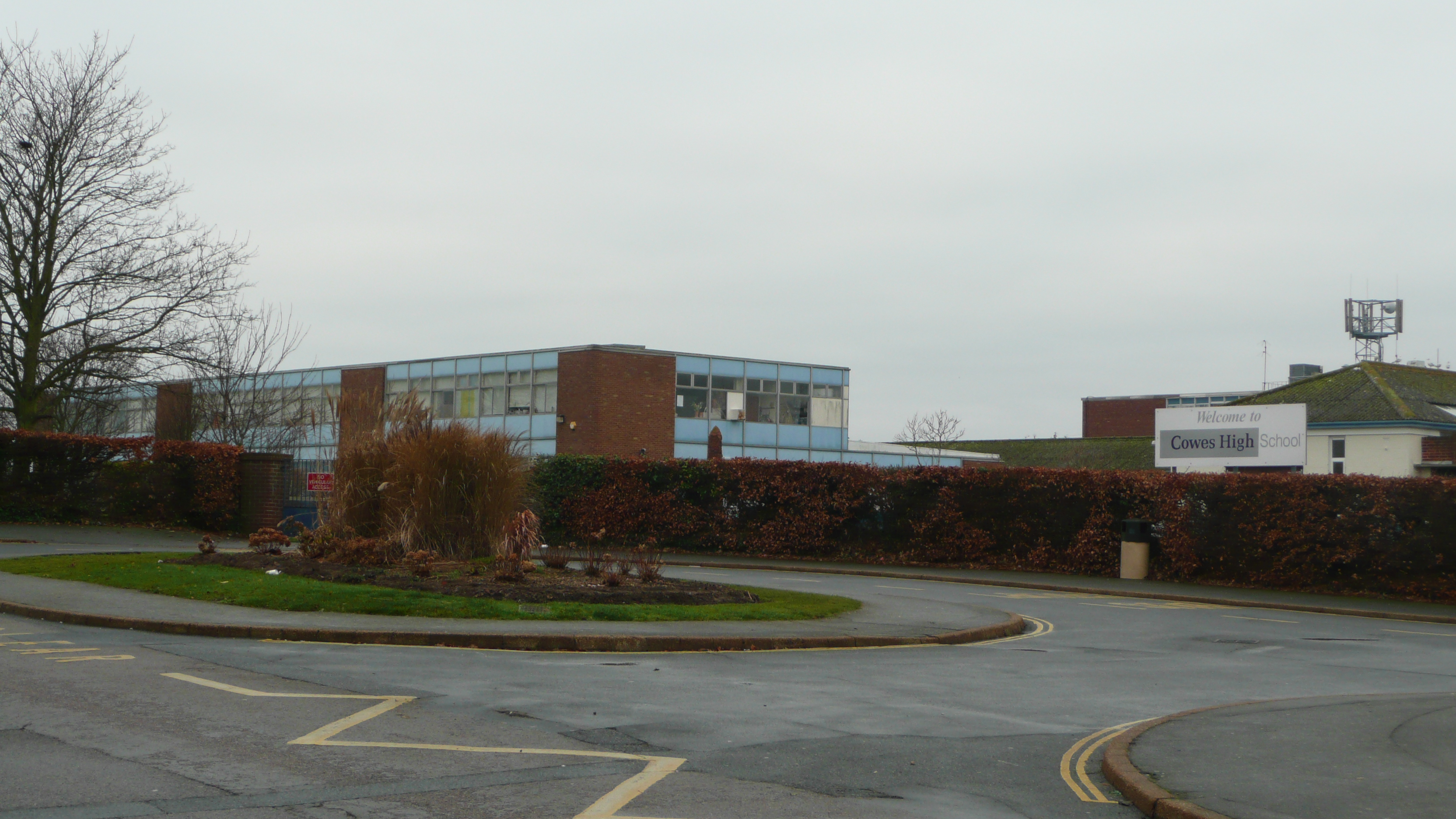

Location
- Crossfield Avenue; Cowes, Isle of Wight, PO31 8HB; England; 50°45′49″N 1°18′27″W

Information
- Type: Academy
- Local authority: Isle of Wight
- Specialist: Business and Enterprise College
- Department for Education URN: 140845 Tables
- Ofsted: Reports
- Principal: Paul Slaughter
- Gender: Mixed
- Age: 11 to 19
- Enrolment: 1216 (Data from January 2022)
- Capacity: 1585 (Data from January 2022)
- Houses: Britannia, Endeavour, Enterprise, Shamrock
- Colour: Charcoal/White/Red
- Website: cowesec.org

Cowes Enterprise College, previously known as Cowes High School, is a coeducational secondary school and sixth form with academy status located on the outskirts of Cowes at Crossfield Avenue on the Isle of Wight, England.

== History ==
As Cowes High School, the school was designated a Business and Enterprise College. As part of the reorganisation of the education system on the Isle of Wight, Cowes Pathfinder Partnership was successful in their bid against Academies Enterprise Trust take over the school. In 2011, the school opened with the age range extended to years 7 through 13. It is now one of five secondary providers on the Isle of Wight.

Last logo of the school under the Cowes High School name

As part of the reorganisation, a bid for £30.5 million was won from the Department for Education and Skills to rebuild the school with a carbon-neutral building, with an aim of being completed by 2012. In December 2008, it was announced that redevelopment of the school had been delayed, caused by procurement rules following court rulings elsewhere, by up to a year with an opening of summer 2012 as the latest opening date,.

The 2014 pass rates for the school were 58% for five or more GCSE A* to C passes including English and Maths, significantly higher than the average for the Isle of Wight and 97% pass rate with 67% of students gaining at least 3 A Level passes.

In September 2012, the college was due to move across into a new £32 million building, however, due to a sustained period of wet weather the opening was delayed until November 2012. At the beginning of December 2012, parents received a letter stating that occupation of the new building now would not take place until September 2013.

Prior to the new opening of the school, headteacher David Snashall stated he would be standing down, with Dave Goodhead taking over. Jonathan Russell was appointed principal for the new Cowes Enterprise College.

Cowes Enterprise College appointed Rebecca Pearce (current vice principal of The City Academy Bristol) as the new principal for January 2014 and converted to academy status in September 2014 joining the Ormiston Academies Trust.

"Personal circumstances" forced Pearce's departure in November 2014 and former Ofsted inspector John Peckham was appointed to "take the school to the next stage"

== Notable former pupils ==
- Si Genaro, British musician and featured contestant on The Voice UK.
- Mark King, lead singer and bass player with Level 42, attended Cowes High School.
- Mornington Lockett, jazz saxophonist
- Kay Marriott, High Sheriff of the Isle of Wight
- Cliff Michelmore, British television presenter and producer.
- Helen Roy, British ecologist, entomologist, and academic
