= List of electoral divisions in the Isle of Wight =

This is a list of electoral divisions and wards in the ceremonial county of Isle of Wight in South East England. All changes since the re-organisation of local government following the passing of the Local Government Act 1972 are shown. The number of councillors elected for each electoral division or ward is shown in brackets.

== County council ==
=== Isle of Wight County Council ===
Electoral Divisions from 1 April 1974 (first election 12 April 1973) to 7 May 1981:

1. Cowes Castle (1)
2. Cowes Central (1)
3. Cowes Medina (1)
4. Cowes Northwood (2)
5. East Cowes (1)
6. Isle of Wight Rural No. 1 (Bembridge) (1)
7. Isle of Wight Rural No. 2 (Brading) (1)
8. Isle of Wight Rural No. 3 (Newchurch) (1)
9. Isle of Wight Rural No. 4 (Niton) (1)
10. Isle of Wight Rural No. 5 (1)
11. Isle of Wight Rural No. 6 (1)
12. Isle of Wight Rural No. 7 (Totland) (1)
13. Isle of Wight Rural No. 8 (Freshwater) (2)
14. Newport Carisbrooke (1)
15. Newport Central (1)
16. Newport Fairlee (2)
17. Newport Mount Joy (1)
18. Newport Pan (2)
19. Newport Parkhurst (1)
20. Osborne (1)
21. Ryde Binstead (1)
22. Ryde North East (1)
23. Ryde North West (1)
24. Ryde South East (1)
25. Ryde South West (2)
26. Ryde St Helens (1)
27. Ryde St Johns (2)
28. Sandown North (1)
29. Sandown South (2)
30. Shanklin North (2)
31. Shanklin South (1)
32. Ventnor Bonchurch & Wroxall (1)
33. Ventnor Central (1)
34. Ventnor St Lawrence (1)

Electoral Divisions from 7 May 1981 to 4 May 1995:

1. Arreton & Newchurch (1)
2. Ashey (1)
3. Bembridge (1)
4. Binstead (1)
5. Brading (1)
6. Brightstone & Shorewell (1)
7. Calbourne Shalfleet & Yarmouth (1)
8. Carisbrooke East (1)
9. Carisbrooke West (1)
10. Chale & Niton (1)
11. Cowes Castle (1)
12. Cowes Central (1)
13. Cowes Medina (1)
14. East Cowes (1)
15. Fairlee (1)
16. Freshwater Afton (1)
17. Freshwater Norton (1)
18. Gatcombe & Godshill (1)
19. Gurnard (1)
20. Mount Joy (1)
21. Nettlestone & St Helens (1)
22. Newport Central (1)
23. Northwood (1)
24. Osborne (1)
25. Pan (1)
26. Parkhurst (1)
27. Ryde North East (1)
28. Ryde North West (1)
29. Ryde South East (1)
30. Ryde South West (1)
31. Sandown Lake (1)
32. Sandown North (1)
33. Sandown South (1)
34. Seaview & Appley (1)
35. Shanklin Central (1)
36. Shanklin North (1)
37. Shanklin South (1)
38. St Lawrence & Lowther (1)
39. St Johns (1)
40. Totland (1)
41. Ventnor Central (1)
42. Wootton (1)
43. Wroxall & Bonchurch (1)

=== Isle of Wight Council ===
Electoral Divisions from 4 May 1995 to 7 June 2001:

1. Arreton & Newchurch (1)
2. Ashey (1)
3. Bembridge — 1 (1)
4. Bembridge — 2 (1)
5. Binstead (1)
6. Brading (1)
7. Brighstone & Shorwell (1)
8. Calbourne, Shalfleet & Yarmouth (1)
9. Carisbrooke East (1)
10. Carisbrooke West (1)
11. Chale, Niton & Whitwell (1)
12. Cowes Castle — 1 (1)
13. Cowes Castle — 2 (1)
14. Cowes Central (1)
15. Cowes Medina (1)
16. East Cowes — 1 (1)
17. East Cowes — 2 (1)
18. Fairlee (1)
19. Freshwater Afton (1)
20. Freshwater Norton (1)
21. Gatcombe, Godshill & Rookley (1)
22. Gurnard (1)
23. Lake — 1 (1)
24. Lake — 2 (1)
25. Mount Joy (1)
26. Newport Central (1)
27. Northwood (1)
28. Osborne (1)
29. Pan (1)
30. Parkhurst (1)
31. Ryde North East (1)
32. Ryde North West (1)
33. Ryde South East (1)
34. Ryde South West (1)
35. St Helens (1)
36. St Johns — 1 (1)
37. St Johns — 2 (1)
38. Sandown — 1 (1)
39. Sandown — 2 (1)
40. Seaview & Nettlestone (1)
41. Shanklin Central (1)
42. Shanklin North (1)
43. Shanklin South (1)
44. Totland (1)
45. Ventnor — 1 (1)
46. Ventnor — 2 (1)
47. Wootton (1)
48. Wroxall (1)

Electoral Divisions from 7 June 2001 to 4 June 2009:

1. Ashey (1)
2. Bembridge North (1)
3. Bembridge South (1)
4. Binstead (1)
5. Brading & St Helens (1)
6. Brighstone & Calbourne (1)
7. Carisbrooke East (1)
8. Carisbrooke West (1)
9. Central Rural (1)
10. Chale, Niton & Whitwell (1)
11. Cowes Castle East (1)
12. Cowes Castle West (1)
13. Cowes Central (1)
14. Cowes Medina (1)
15. East Cowes North (1)
16. East Cowes South (1)
17. Fairlees (1)
18. Freshwater Afton (1)
19. Freshwater Norton (1)
20. Gurnard (1)
21. Lake North (1)
22. Lake South (1)
23. Mount Joy (1)
24. Newchurch (1)
25. Newport North (1)
26. Newport South (1)
27. Northwood (1)
28. Osborne (1)
29. Pan (1)
30. Parkhurst (1)
31. Ryde North East (1)
32. Ryde North West (1)
33. Ryde South East (1)
34. Ryde South West (1)
35. St Johns East (1)
36. St Johns West (1)
37. Sandown North (1)
38. Sandown South (1)
39. Seaview & Nettlestone (1)
40. Shalfleet & Yarmouth (1)
41. Shanklin Central (1)
42. Shanklin North (1)
43. Shanklin South (1)
44. Totland (1)
45. Ventnor East (1)
46. Ventnor West (1)
47. Wootton (1)
48. Wroxall & Godshill (1)

Electoral Divisions from 4 June 2009 to 6 May 2021:

1. Arreton & Newchurch (1)
2. Binstead & Fishbourne (1)
3. Brading, St Helens & Bembridge (2)
4. Carisbrooke (1)
5. Central Wight (1)
6. Chale, Niton & Whitwell (1)
7. Cowes Medina (1)
8. Cowes North (1)
9. Cowes South & Northwood (1)
10. Cowes West & Gurnard (1)
11. East Cowes (1)
12. Freshwater North (1)
13. Freshwater South (1)
14. Godshill & Wroxall (1)
15. Havenstreet, Ashey & Haylands (1)
16. Lake North (1)
17. Lake South (1)
18. Nettlestone & Seaview (1)
19. Newport Central (1)
20. Newport East (1)
21. Newport North (1)
22. Newport South (1)
23. Newport West (1)
24. Parkhurst (1)
25. Ryde East (1)
26. Ryde North East (1)
27. Ryde North West (1)
28. Ryde South (1)
29. Ryde West (1)
30. Sandown North (1)
31. Sandown South (1)
32. Shanklin Central (1)
33. Shanklin South (1)
34. Totland (1)
35. Ventnor East (1)
36. Ventnor West (1)
37. West Wight (1)
38. Whippingham & Osborne (1)
39. Wootton Bridge (1)

Electoral Divisions from 6 May 2021 to present:

1. Bembridge (1)
2. Binstead & Fishbourne (1)
3. Brading & St Helens (1)
4. Brighstone, Calbourne & Shalfleet (1)
5. Carisbrooke & Gunville (1)
6. Central Rural (1)
7. Chale, Niton & Shorwell (1)
8. Cowes Medina (1)
9. Cowes North (1)
10. Cowes South & Northwood (1)
11. Cowes West & Gurnard (1)
12. East Cowes (1)
13. Fairlee & Whippingham (1)
14. Freshwater North & Yarmouth (1)
15. Freshwater South (1)
16. Haylands & Swanmore (1)
17. Lake North (1)
18. Lake South (1)
19. Mountjoy & Shide (1)
20. Nettlestone & Seaview (1)
21. Newchurch, Havenstreet & Ashey (1)
22. Newport Central (1)
23. Newport West (1)
24. Osborne (1)
25. Pan & Barton (1)
26. Parkhurst & Hunnyhill (1)
27. Ryde Appley & Elmfield (1)
28. Ryde Monktonmead (1)
29. Ryde North West (1)
30. Ryde South East (1)
31. Ryde West (1)
32. Sandown North (1)
33. Sandown South (1)
34. Shanklin Central (1)
35. Shanklin South (1)
36. Totland & Colwell (1)
37. Ventnor & St Lawrence (1)
38. Wootton Bridge (1)
39. Wroxall, Lowtherville & Bonchurch (1)

== Former district councils ==
=== Medina ===
Wards from 1 April 1974 (first election 7 June 1973) to 3 May 1979:

Wards from 3 May 1979 to 1 April 1995 (district abolished):

=== South Wight ===
Wards from 1 April 1974 (first election 7 June 1973) to 3 May 1979:

Wards from 3 May 1979 to 1 April 1995 (district abolished):

== Electoral divisions by constituency ==
Wards as they existed on 4 May 2021.

=== Isle of Wight East ===
Bembridge; Binstead & Fishbourne; Brading & St. Helens; Haylands & Swanmore; Lake North; Lake South; Nettlestone & Seaview; Newchurch, Havenstreet & Ashey; Ryde Appley & Elmfield; Ryde Monktonmead; Ryde North West; Ryde South East; Ryde West; Sandown North; Sandown South; Shanklin Central; Shanklin South; Ventnor & St. Lawrence; Wootton Bridge; Wroxall, Lowtherville & Bonchurch.

=== Isle of Wight West ===
Brighstone, Calbourne & Shalfleet; Carisbrooke & Gunville; Central Rural; Chale, Niton & Shorwell; Cowes Medina; Cowes North; Cowes South & Northwood; Cowes West & Gurnard; East Cowes; Fairlee & Whippingham; Freshwater North & Yarmouth; Freshwater South; Mountjoy & Shide; Newport Central; Newport West; Osborne; Pan & Barton; Parkhurst & Hunnyhill; Totland & Colwell.
