= Isle of Wight Council elections =

Local government elections in the Isle of Wight, England

Isle of Wight Council is the local authority for the Isle of Wight, a unitary authority and non-metropolitan county in England. Since the last boundary changes in 2021 the island has been divided into 39 electoral divisions, each of which elects one councillor. Elections are held every four years.

== Council elections ==
=== Non-metropolitan county elections ===
- 1973 Isle of Wight County Council election
- 1977 Isle of Wight County Council election
- 1981 Isle of Wight County Council election
- 1985 Isle of Wight County Council election
- 1989 Isle of Wight County Council election
- 1993 Isle of Wight County Council election

=== Unitary authority elections ===
- 1995 Isle of Wight Council election
- 1998 Isle of Wight Council election
- 2001 Isle of Wight Council election
- 2005 Isle of Wight Council election
- 2009 Isle of Wight Council election (new division boundaries)
- 2013 Isle of Wight Council election
- 2017 Isle of Wight Council election
- 2021 Isle of Wight Council election (new division boundaries)
- 2026 Isle of Wight Council election - postponed from 2025 due to possible reorganisation

== County result maps ==
2005 results map

2009 results map

2013 results map

2017 results map

2021 results map

2026 results map

== By-elections ==
=== 2005–2009 ===
Newport North by-election 30 August 2007
Party	Candidate	Votes	%	±%
Conservative		207	35.5	−3.0
Liberal Democrats		189	32.4	+3.9
Labour		137	23.5	−9.5
UKIP		25	4.3	+4.3
Independent		23	3.9	+3.9
Independent		2	0.3	+0.3
Majority		18	3.1	
Turnout		583		
Conservative hold		Swing		

Mount Joy by-election 9 October 2008
Party	Candidate	Votes	%	±%
Conservative		286	45.5	−2.7
Liberal Democrats		155	24.6	−5.8
Independent		150	23.8	+23.8
Labour		38	6.0	−12.9
Majority		131	20.8	
Turnout		629		
Conservative hold		Swing		

Mount Joy by-election 18 December 2008
Party	Candidate	Votes	%	±%
Liberal Democrats		389	39.7	+39.7
Conservative		377	38.5	−8.0
Independent		213	21.8	+21.8
Majority		12	1.2	
Turnout		979		
Liberal Democrats gain from Conservative		Swing		

=== 2009–2013 ===
Ryde South by-election 5 May 2010
Party	Candidate	Votes	%	±%
Conservative	Gary Taylor	274	37.2	+10.8
Labour	Deborah Gardiner	201	27.3	+19.1
Liberal Democrats	Tony Zeid	164	22.3	−11.2
Independent	Ian Jenkins	97	13.2	+13.2
Majority		73	9.9	
Turnout		736		
Conservative gain from Liberal Democrats		Swing		

Chale, Niton and Whitwell by-election 11 November 2010
Party	Candidate	Votes	%	±%
Conservative	Dave Stewart	510	53.6	−7.7
Liberal Democrats	Malcolm Groves	365	38.4	−0.3
Labour	Josh Cooper	76	8.0	+8.0
Majority		145	15.2	
Turnout		951		
Conservative hold		Swing		

Binstead and Fishbourne by-election 23 June 2011
Party	Candidate	Votes	%	±%
Independent	Ivor Warlow	428	37.2	−4.9
Conservative	Ian Cobb	424	36.9	−5.6
Liberal Democrats	Tim Wakeley	139	12.1	−3.3
UKIP	Daryll Pitcher	93	8.1	+8.1
Labour	Mick Lyons	66	5.7	+5.7
Majority		4	0.3	
Turnout		1,150		
Independent gain from Conservative		Swing		

West Wight by-election 17 November 2011
Party	Candidate	Votes	%	±%
Conservative	Stuart Hutchinson	640	76.7	+30.2
Liberal Democrats	Mike Carr	116	13.9	+13.9
UKIP	Rose Lynden-Bell	78	9.4	+9.4
Majority		524	62.8	
Turnout		834		
Conservative gain from Independent		Swing		

=== 2017–2021 ===
Central Wight by-election 25 January 2018
Party	Candidate	Votes	%	±%
Conservative	Steve Hastings	547	49.7	−25.5
Liberal Democrats	Nick Stuart	286	26.0	+26.0
Green	Daniel James	143	13.0	−5.9
Labour	Simon Haytack	101	9.2	+3.3
UKIP	Terry Brennan	24	2.2	+2.2
Majority		261	23.7	
Turnout		1,101		
Conservative hold		Swing		

Whippingham and Osborne by-election 20 June 2019
Party	Candidate	Votes	%	±%
Conservative	Stephen Hendry	318	35.1	+9.3
Liberal Democrats	Julie Burridge	179	19.8	+14.7
Independent	Michael Paler	167	18.4	+18.4
Labour	Luisa Hillard	141	15.6	+3.6
Island Independents	Karen Lucioni	60	6.6	+6.6
UKIP	Rose Lynden-Bell	41	4.5	+4.5
Majority		139	15.3	
Turnout		906		
Conservative gain from Independent		Swing		

Newport West by-election 12 December 2019
Party	Candidate	Votes	%	±%
Conservative	Richard Hollis	605	35.7	−4.5
Labour	Maria Villa Vine	408	24.1	+18.0
Green	Joe Lever	361	21.3	+0.6
Liberal Democrats	Nick Stuart	238	14.0	+10.4
Independent	Stephen Reynolds	47	2.8	+2.8
Independent	Julian Harris	36	2.1	+2.1
Majority		197	11.6	
Turnout		1,695		
Conservative hold		Swing		

=== 2021–2026 ===
Brighstone, Calbourne and Shalfleet by-election 24 November 2022
Party	Candidate	Votes	%	±%
Liberal Democrats	Nick Stuart	526	53.4	+23.5
Conservative	Carol Bryan	239	24.3	−19.2
Green	Doug Alldred	153	15.5	−11.1
Vectis Party	Stephen Parkes	36	3.7	+3.7
Labour	Gary Clarke	31	3.1	+3.1
Majority		287	29.1	
Turnout		985		
Liberal Democrats gain from Conservative		Swing		

Wootton Bridge by-election 24 August 2023
Party	Candidate	Votes	%	±%
Liberal Democrats	Sarah Redrup	475	47.9	+47.9
Conservative	Ed Hopper	291	29.3	−2.5
Vectis Party	Linda Pitcher	178	17.9	−29.4
Green	Michael Smith	48	4.8	−8.7
Majority		184	18.5	
Turnout		992		
Liberal Democrats gain from Vectis Party		Swing		

Ventnor and St Lawrence by-election 21 December 2023
Party	Candidate	Votes	%	±%
Conservative	Ed Blake	274	41.1	+14.3
Labour	Steve Cooper	248	37.2	+16.9
Liberal Democrats	Ray Harrington-Vail	145	21.7	+21.7
Majority		26	3.9	
Turnout		667		
Conservative hold		Swing		

Central Rural by-election 1 May 2025
Party	Candidate	Votes	%	±%
Reform	Caroline Gladwin	410	39.8	+39.8
Conservative	Simon Richards	220	13.4	−36.0
Green	Julia Laursen	219	21.3	−7.7
Liberal Democrats	Bob Blezzard	146	14.2	+14.2
Labour	Simon Haytack	34	3.3	−10.2
Majority		190	18.5	
Turnout		1,029		
Reform gain from Conservative		Swing		

Freshwater South by-election 1 May 2025
Party	Candidate	Votes	%	±%
Independent	Becca Cameron	472	43.1	+43.1
Reform	Bill Nigh	269	24.6	+24.6
Conservative	Warren Whyte	147	13.4	−34.6
Independent	Emma Cox	105	9.6	+9.6
Labour	Anne Bamford	74	6.8	+6.8
Liberal Democrats	Tony Zeid	28	2.6	+2.6
Majority		203	18.5	
Turnout		1,095		
Independent hold		Swing		

Lake North by-election 1 May 2025
Party	Candidate	Votes	%	±%
Reform	David Maclean	291	36.1	+36.1
Conservative	Adrian Whittaker	232	28.7	−15.1
Green	Robert May	97	12.0	+1.9
Liberal Democrats	Julie Burridge	85	10.5	+10.5
Independent	Sarah Morris	55	6.8	+6.8
Labour	Emily Brothers	47	5.8	−9.0
Majority		59	7.3	
Turnout		807		
Reform gain from Conservative		Swing		

Lake North by-election 2 October 2025
Party	Candidate	Votes	%	±%
Reform	Bill Nigh	290	36.8	+0.7
Conservative	Adrian Whittaker	249	31.6	+2.9
Liberal Democrats	Bob Blezzard	118	15.0	+4.5
Green	Robert May	88	11.2	−0.8
Labour	Christopher Lloyd	44	5.6	−0.2
Majority		41	5.2	
Turnout		789		
Reform hold		Swing		
