= Politics of the Isle of Wight =

As a geographical entity distinct from the mainland, the Isle of Wight has always fought to have its identity recognised. The Isle of Wight is currently a ceremonial and non-metropolitan county and local government is controlled by unitary authority. Prior to the 2024 United Kingdom general election, the island was the highest populated Westminster constituency in the country.

== Political history ==
Historically, the island was part of the historic county of Hampshire, previously called Southamptonshire.

=== Historic boroughs of the Island ===
The island's most ancient borough was Newtown on the large natural harbour on the island's north-western coast. A French raid in 1377, that destroyed much of the town as well as other Island settlements, sealed its permanent decline. By the middle of the sixteenth century, it was a small settlement long eclipsed by the more easily defended town of Newport. Elizabeth I breathed some life into the town by awarding two parliamentary seats but this ultimately made it one of the most notorious of the Rotten Boroughs. By the time of the Great Reform Act that abolished the seats, it had just fourteen houses and twenty-three voters. The Act also disenfranchised the borough of Yarmouth and replaced the four lost seats with the first MP for the whole Isle of Wight. Newport retained its two seats until the Second Reform Act 1867 which reduced its representation to one MP. Newport lost its separate representation entirely as a result of the Redistribution of Seats Act 1885.

=== Local governance ===
Often thought of as part of Hampshire, the Isle of Wight was briefly included in that county when the first county councils were created in 1888. However, a "Home Rule" campaign led to a separate Isle of Wight County Council being established in 1890, and the island has remained independent of mainland local government ever since. The island was, however, part of the "Assize county" of Hampshire. Like inhabitants of many islands, Islanders are fiercely jealous of their real (or perceived) independence, and confusion over the Island's separate status is a perennial source of friction.

It was planned to merge the county back into Hampshire as a district in the 1974 local government reform, but a last minute change led to it retaining its county council. However, since there was no provision made in the Local Government Act 1972 for unitary authorities, the Island had to retain a two-tier structure, with a county council and two boroughs, Medina and South Wight.

The borough councils were merged with the county council on 1 April 1995 to form a single unitary authority, the Isle of Wight Council, as recommended by the Local Government Commission for England. The only significant present-day administrative link with Hampshire is the police service, which is joint between Hampshire and the Isle of Wight.

== House of Commons representation ==
From the 2024 general election onwards, the Isle of Wight has been split into two constituencies; Isle of Wight East and Isle of Wight West. Prior to this, the Isle of Wight formed a single constituency.

The constituency was traditionally a battleground between the Conservatives and the Liberal Democrats. Between 1974 and 1987, the seat was a Liberal seat, then becoming Conservative until 1997 when the Liberal Democrats won on a reduced Conservative vote. The seat reverted to the Conservatives in 2001, and has remained Conservative since, with the Liberal Democrats falling to fifth place in 2015, when UKIP came second. The Labour Party came second in 2017, with the Liberal Democrats and UKIP both losing their deposits.

=== 2024 general election ===
Isle of Wight East elected a new Conservative MP (Joe Robertson), while the incumbent Conservative MP Bob Seely lost election in Isle of Wight West to Richard Quigley (Labour).

General election 2024: Isle of Wight East
Party	Candidate	Votes	%	±%
Conservative	Joe Robertson	10,427	30.6	−26.8
Reform	Sarah Morris	7,104	20.8	N/A
Green	Vix Lowthion	6,313	18.5	+4.5
Labour	Emily Brothers	6,264	18.4	−5.7
Liberal Democrats	Michael Lilley	3,550	10.4	N/A
Independent	David Groocock	420	1.2	N/A
Majority		3,323	9.8	
Turnout		34,078	61.0	
Conservative hold		Swing		

General election 2024: Isle of Wight West
Party	Candidate	Votes	%	±%
Labour	Richard Quigley	13,240	38.6	+14.1
Conservative	Bob Seely	10,063	29.3	−25.7
Reform	Ian Pickering	5,834	17.0	N/A
Liberal Democrats	Nick Stuart	2,726	7.9	N/A
Green	Cameron Palin	2,310	6.7	−9.7
ADF	Rachel Thacker	117	0.3	N/A
Majority		3,177	9.3	
Turnout		34,290	61.9	
Labour gain from Conservative		Swing	+19.8	

=== 2019 general election ===
The Isle of Wight reelected Conservative incumbent Bob Seely as MP in the 2019 General Election.

General election 2019: Isle of Wight
Party	Candidate	Votes	%	±%
Conservative	Bob Seely	41,815	56.2	+4.9
Labour	Richard Quigley	18,078	24.3	+1.3
Green	Vix Lowthion	11,338	15.2	–2.1
Independent Network	Carl Feeney	1,542	2.1	N/A
Independent	Karl Love	874	1.2	N/A
Independent	Daryll Pitcher	795	1.1	N/A
Majority		23,737	31.9	+3.6
Turnout		74,442	65.9	–1.4
Registered electors		113,021		
Conservative hold		Swing		

=== 2017 general election ===
The sitting MP Andrew Turner stepped down at the 2017 United Kingdom general election held on 8 June after a controversy regarding remarks he made about homosexuality. He was replaced as the Conservative candidate by Bob Seely, an Isle of Wight councillor and former soldier who went on to be elected as the MP.

General election 2017: Isle of Wight
Party	Candidate	Votes	%	±%
Conservative	Bob Seely	38,190	51.3	+10.6
Labour	Julian Critchley	17,121	23.0	+10.2
Green	Vix Lowthion	12,915	17.3	+4.0
Liberal Democrats	Nicholas Belfitt	2,740	3.7	−3.8
UKIP	Daryll Pitcher	1,921	2.6	−18.6
Independent	Julie Jones-Evans	1,592	2.1	+2.1
Majority		21,069	28.3	+8.8
Turnout		74,479	67.3	+2.3
Conservative hold		Swing	+0.2	

=== 2015 general election ===
Six candidates stood for the Isle of Wight constituency in the 2015 United Kingdom general election which was held on 7 May 2015.

General election 2015: Isle of Wight
Party	Candidate	Votes	%	±%
Conservative	Andrew Turner	28,591	40.7	−6.0
UKIP	Iain McKie	14,888	21.2	+17.7
Green	Vix Lowthion	9,404	13.4	+12.1
Labour	Stewart Blackmore	8,984	12.8	+1.2
Liberal Democrats	David Goodall	5,235	7.5	−24.2
Independent	Ian Stephens	3,198	4.5	N/A
Majority		13,703	19.5	+4.5
Turnout		70,300	65.0	+1.1
Conservative hold		Swing	-11.8	

=== 2010 general election ===
Eleven candidates stood for the Isle of Wight constituency in the 2010 United Kingdom general election which was held on 6 May 2010.

General election 2010: Isle of Wight
Party	Candidate	Votes	%	±%
Conservative	Andrew Turner	32,810	46.7	−2.3
Liberal Democrats	Jill Wareham	22,283	31.7	+2.2
Labour	Mark Chiverton	8,169	11.6	−5.6
UKIP	Michael Tarrant	2,435	3.5	+0.1
BNP	Geoff Clynch	1,457	2.1	N/A
English Democrat	Ian Dunsire	1,233	1.8	N/A
Green	Bob Keats	931	1.3	N/A
Middle England Party	Paul Martin	616	0.9	N/A
Independent	Pete Harris	175	0.2	N/A
Independent	Paul Randle-Jolliffe	89	0.1	N/A
Independent	Edward Corby	66	0.1	−0.7
Majority		10,527	15.0	
Turnout		70,264	63.9	
Conservative hold		Swing		

=== 2005 general election ===
Five candidates contested the Isle of Wight constituency in the 2005 United Kingdom general election held on 5 May 2005.

General election 2005: Isle of Wight
Party	Candidate	Votes	%	±%
Conservative	Andrew Turner	32,717	48.9	+9.2
Liberal Democrats	Anthony Rowlands	19,739	29.5	−5.8
Labour	Mark Chiverton	11,484	17.2	+2.0
UKIP	Michael Tarrant	2,352	3.5	+0.2
Independent	Edward Corby	551	0.8	
Majority		12,978	19.4	
Turnout		66,843	61.3	+0.5
Conservative hold		Swing	+7.5	

The election was expected to be a close race between the Liberal Democrats and Conservatives, but the high Conservative vote even surprised the successful candidate. The simultaneous local elections resulted in a Conservative landslide, and the high turnout and popular Conservative vote in the parliamentary election was likely to be a local sign of dissatisfaction with the incumbent, largely Liberal Democrat Council, as well as reflecting on the national issues. The Labour Party continued to buck the national trend and increased the Labour vote to the highest for over 30 years, whilst the UKIP, did not manage to make the breakthrough expected by some, and only slightly increased their vote share.

== Local government ==
After the 2017 local council elections, the Conservatives gained a majority of seats on the Isle of Wight Council. The Island Independents were the ruling group on the council between 2013 and January 2017, when the resignation of the council leader Jonathan Bacon led to a Conservative minority administration led by Dave Stewart. The council had previously been Conservative controlled between 2005 and 2013.

=== 2017 local council elections ===
The local council elections were held on 4 May 2017.

Party	Cllrs	Gain/Loss
Conservative Party	25	+10
Independents	11	-9
Liberal Democrats	2	+1
Green	1	+1
Labour Party	1	-1
UK Independence Party	0	-2
Total	40	-

=== 2013 local council elections ===
The local council elections were held on 2 May 2013.

Party	Cllrs	Gain/Loss
Independents	20	+11
Conservative Party	15	-9
Labour Party	2	+1
UK Independence Party	2	+2
Liberal Democrats	1	-3
Others	0	-2
Total	40	-

=== 2009 local council elections ===
The local council elections were held on 4 June 2009, the same date as the European Parliament elections. Following a review by the Boundary Commission for England the number of councillors was reduced from 48 to 40, consisting of 38 single member constituencies and 1 double member constituency.

Party	2005 Cllrs	2005 Cllrs, restated	Gain/Loss	2009 Cllrs
Conservative Party	35	29	-5	24
Independents	5	4	+3	7
Liberal Democrats	5	4	+1	5
Labour Party	2	2	-1	1
Others	1	1	+2	3
Total	48	40	-	40

=== 2005 local council elections ===
The local council elections were held on 5 May 2005, the same date as the general election of that year.

Party	Cllrs	Gain/Loss
Conservatives	35	+23
Liberal Democrats	5	-14
Independents	5	-6
Labour	2	-3
Others	1	0
Total	48	-

A local referendum on the issue of a directly elected mayor of the Isle of Wight was held at the same time as the local elections - this failed to pass, with 37,097 against to 28,786 for.

=== Historical results ===
Prior to 1995, these results are for Isle of Wight County Council.

Election Year	Incumbent Party/Parties
1973	Independent
1977	Conservatives
1981	Liberals
1985	Liberal/Social Democrats
1989	Liberal Democrats
1993	Liberal Democrats
1995	Liberal Democrats
1998	No Overall Control (Liberal Democrats largest grouping)
2001	No Overall Control; Island First (Liberal Democrats and Independents) controlling group.
2005	Conservative Party
2009	Conservative Party
2013	Island Independents
2017	Conservative Party

== EU referendum ==
The Isle of Wight voted 62% to leave the European Union in the 2016 EU referendum, compared with 52% nationally.

United Kingdom European Union membership referendum, 2016; Isle of Wight
Choice	Votes	%
Leave the European Union	49,173	61.91%
Remain a member of the European Union	30,207	38.03%
Valid votes	79,380	99.94%
Invalid or blank votes	50	0.06%
Total votes	79,430	100.00%
Registered voters and turnout	109,844	72.31%

== European parliamentary representation ==
The Isle of Wight was a part of the South East England region for the purposes of European Parliamentary elections.

=== 2019 European parliamentary elections ===
The following results are exclusively for the Isle of Wight; results are collated regionally prior to MEPs being assigned under the closed list proportional representation system.

Party	Votes	Percentage Share	SE England Share	SE England MEPs
Brexit Party	19,392	46.67	36.07	4
Green Party	6,855	16.49	13.52	1
Liberal Democrats	6,557	15.55	25.75	3
Conservatives	3,577	8.60	10.25	1
Labour	2,481	5.97	7.27	1
UK Independence	1,292	3.10	2.22	0
Change UK	1,107	2.66	4.17	0
UK EU	127	0.30	0.3	0
Jason McMahon	52	0.12	0.14	0
David Round	50	0.12	0.1	0
Socialist (GB)	39	0.9	0.14	0
Michael Tuberville	22	0.05	0.6	0

=== 2014 European parliamentary elections ===
The results of the 2014 European Parliament election on the Isle of Wight were as follows.

Party	Votes	Percentage Share	SE England Share	SE England MEPs
UK Independence	14,533	40.93	32.14	4
Conservatives	9,335	26.29	30.95	3
Green Party	3,854	10.85	9.05	1
Labour	3,708	10.44	14.66	1
Liberal Democrats	1,969	5.55	8.04	1
An Independence from Europe	841	2.37	1.93	
English Democrats	341	0.96	0.76	
BNP	294	0.83	0.72	
Christian Peoples	237	0.67	0.64	
Peace	139	0.39	0.43	
Socialist (GB)	77	0.22	0.23	
Roman Party	52	0.15	0.13	
YOURVoice	49	0.14	0.12	
Liberty GB	42	0.12	0.11	
Harmony Party	35	0.10	0.08	
Rejected Ballots	94			

Turnout on the Isle of Wight was 35,600 out of an electorate of 111,879 (31.82%)

=== 2009 European parliamentary elections ===
The results of the 2009 European election on the Isle of Wight were as follows.

The following results are exclusively for the Isle of Wight; results are collated regionally prior to MEPs being assigned under the closed list proportional representation system.

Party	Votes	Percentage Share	SE England Share	SE England MEPs
Conservatives	14,122	32.3	34.8	4
UK Independence	9,563	21.9	18.8	2
Green	5,380	12.3	11.6	1
Liberal Democrats	5,112	11.7	14.1	2
Labour	2,607	6.0	8.2	1
British National Party	2,223	5.1	4.4	
English Democrats	1,148	2.6	2.2	
Christian Party	736	1.7	1.5	
No2EU	461	1.1	0.9	
United Kingdom First	380	0.9	0.7	
Socialist Labour Party	343	0.8	0.7	
Jury Team	274	0.6	0.6	
Libertas	247	0.6	0.7	
The Peace Party	201	0.5	0.4	
The Roman Party	101	0.2	0.2	
Rejected Ballots	811	1.9		

Turnout on the Isle of Wight was 43,709 on an electorate of 109,796 (39.81%)

=== 2004 European parliamentary elections ===
The results of the 2004 European election on the Isle of Wight were as follows.

The following results are exclusively for the Isle of Wight; results are collated regionally prior to MEPs being assigned under the closed list proportional representation system.

Party	Votes	Percentage Share	SE England Share	SE England MEPs
Conservatives	11,341	32.4%	35.2%	4
UK Independence	9,913	28.4%	19.5%	2
Liberal Democrats	4,234	12.1%	15.3%	2
Labour	3,479	9.9%	13.7%	1
Green	2,745	7.8%	7.9%	1
Senior Citizens	1,237	3.5%	1.9%	
British National Party	918	2.6%	2.9%	
English Democrats	523	1.5%	1.3%	
Peace	151	0.4%	0.6%	
Christian Alliance	140	0.4%	0.5%	
ProLife Alliance	103	0.3%	0.3%	
Respect	100	0.3%	0.6%	
Independent - Rhodes	81	0.2%	0.3%	

Regionally, turnout was 36.5% on an electorate of 6,087,103.

== Local political issues ==
=== Fixed link ===
For many years, there has been debate over whether or not a bridge or tunnel should connect the island with mainland Britain. This became more of an issue towards the end of the twentieth century, when it became more economically and technically feasible to build such a link, with the bridge to the Isle of Skye as a model. Continuing debate centres on whether a fixed link is desirable.

Around the start of the 21st century, the Isle of Wight Party campaigned from a positive position, although extensive public debate on the subject revealed a strong body of opinion against such a proposal. In 2002, the Isle of Wight Council debated the issue and made a policy statement against the proposal, whilst MP Andrew Turner remains opposed to the construction of a link.

Arguments in favour of a fixed link tend to concentrate upon the increased ease of access to and from the Island and a possible economic benefit from improved communications with the mainland. People of all ages often express dissatisfaction with the cost of cross-Solent travel, and although this is not quite the same issue as the link debate, the two are often combined by the assumption that a fixed link would be cheaper.

Arguments against a fixed link include the inevitable rise in property prices stemming from making it easier to commute to cities like London (thus increasing strain on lower wage families); the risk of losing local services and facilities to the much larger and economically more active south Hampshire conurbation; the expected rise in rural crime (which increased sharply in Hampshire in 2014); and a risk to the unique island culture and environment. An expected increase in street crime is also an issue. Overall crime rates on the island are however already at levels comparable to similar areas on the mainland and in many cases higher than other nearby areas in south Hampshire.

Although those in favour of a fixed link tend to envisage a tolled road link in the same vein as the bridge to Skye, plans have also been proposed for passenger-only rail and tram links under the Solent, linking Ryde with Portsmouth and Gosport. These kind of plans have tended to win more support with island residents in the past. However a survey commissioned and run by the Pro Link campaign suggested in 2017 that public opinion on the island was beginning to change in favour of a road link.

=== Autonomy and political recognition ===
A number of discussions about the status of the island have taken place over many years, with standpoints from the extreme of wanting full sovereignty for the Isle of Wight, to what could be described as the opposite extreme of merging the county back into Hampshire. The pro-independence lobby had a formal voice in the early 1970s with the Vectis National Party. Their main claim was that the sale of the island to the crown in 1293 was unconstitutional (see History of the Isle of Wight). However, this movement now has little serious support.

Since the 1990s the debate has largely taken the form of a campaign to have the Isle of Wight recognized as a distinct region by organizations such as the EU, due to its relative poverty within southern England. One argument in favour of special treatment is that this poverty is not acknowledged by such organizations as it is distorted statistically by retired and wealthy (but less economically active) immigrants from the mainland.

In 2022, as part of the Levelling Up White Paper, an "Island Forum" was proposed, which would allow local policymakers and residents on the Isle of Wight to work alongside their counterparts in Orkney, Shetland, the Western Isles and Anglesey on common issues, such as broadband connectivity, and provide a platform for them to communicate directly with the government on the challenges island communities face in terms of levelling up.

=== Wind turbines ===
Wind turbines has been an issue the island has remained divided over since proposals were first put forward, with many residents in the West Wight, where they are likely to be built claiming they would be unsightly and create a lot of noise. In protest against wind turbines the pressure group ThWART was formed (The Wight Against Rural Turbines) with the aim of working with the council to adopt a realistic renewable energy policy with solutions other than wind turbines, claiming that any on the island would be inappropriately sited.

Initially plans were put forward for seven turbines to be built on land close to Wellow with many people around the area criticising the plan with the view that better alternatives could be found. Petitions were set up by local residents before the planning application was put forward to the council, and the plans were later rejected. Following this several other applications have been submitted to the council for turbines at various locations including small wind turbines at Ventnor Golf Club. Plans for small turbines at Cheverton Down have already been given the go ahead but plans for larger ones at 125 metres tall were rejected by Isle of Wight Council planners on 3 December 2009. It is still unclear whether developers will appeal against this decision.

General views from residents on the island have been mixed to proposals, and it is therefore unclear when and where wind turbines will eventually be constructed. The Isle of Wight Council stated that in a survey carried out at the beginning of 2009 on local residents attitudes towards wind turbines were two to one against, with 612 in favour and 1,328 against Cheverton Down proposals.

== See also ==
- Isle of Wight Council
- Isle of Wight
- History of the Isle of Wight
- Politics of the United Kingdom
