= 2026 Isle of Wight Council election =

2026 English local election

- 7 May 2026

All 39 seats to the Isle of Wight Council 20 seats needed for a majority
- Registered: 110,666
- Turnout: 48,218; 43.6% ▲6.7pp
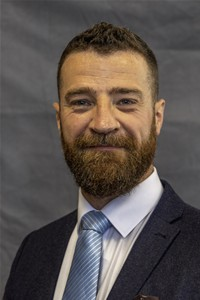

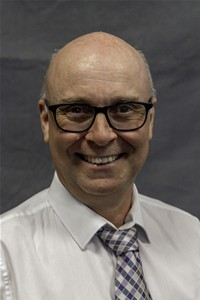

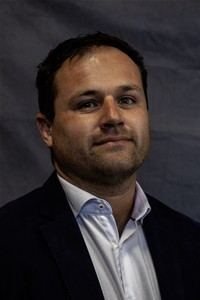

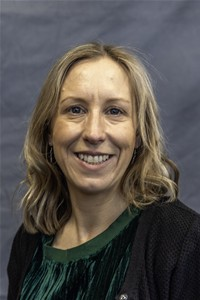

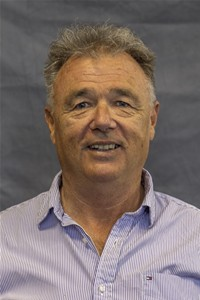
	First party	Second party	Third party
Leader	James Whelan		Andrew Garratt
Party	Reform	Independent	Liberal Democrats
Leader's seat	Central Rural		Parkhurst and Hunnyhill
Last election	Did not stand	13 seats, 24.4%	1 seats, 5.2%
Seats before	2	17	4
Seats won	19	11	4
Seat change	▲19	▼2	▲3
Popular vote	15,340	11,600	4,060
Percentage	31.9%	24.1%	8.4%
Swing	▲31.9pp	▼0.3pp	▲3.2pp
	Fourth party	Fifth party	Sixth party
Leader	Ed Blake	Claire Critchison	Jock Rafferty
Party	Conservative	Green	Labour
Leader's seat	Ventnor and St Lawrence	Chale, Niton and Whitwell	Cowes North
Last election	18 seats, 38.7%	2 seats, 11.1%	1 seat, 11.6%
Seats before	13	2	1
Seats won	2	2	1
Seat change	▼16	Steady	Steady
Popular vote	9,040	6,032	1,840
Percentage	18.8%	12.5%	3.8%
Swing	▼19.9pp	▲1.4pp	▼7.8pp
- Results by Ward
Council leader before election
Phil Jordan
Independent
No overall control (Note: "Alliance Group" coalition of some of the independent councillors, Green Party, and Our Island.)
Council leader after election
Jonathan Bacon
Independent
No overall control

The 2026 Isle of Wight Council election took place on 7 May 2026 to elect members to Isle of Wight Council on the Isle of Wight, England. 39 seats were elected. This was on the same day as other local elections. The council remained under no overall control. At 43.6%, turnout was the highest for an all-out Isle of Wight council election, outside of a general election year, since 1993.

Prior to the election, the council was under no overall control, being run by a coalition called the "Alliance Group", comprising some of the independent councillors and the Green Party, led by independent councillor Phil Jordan.

At this election, the council remained under no overall control. Reform UK, which had only two seats immediately before the election, won nineteen seats, becoming the largest party but falling one seat short of an overall majority. The incumbent leader of the council, Phil Jordan, lost his seat. At the subsequent annual council meeting on 27 May 2026, independent councillor Jonathan Bacon was appointed as the new leader of the council with the backing of Reform UK and some of the independent councillors. All the committee chair positions were taken by either Reform or independent councillors.

== Background ==
At the 2021 election, the Conservatives lost the council to no overall control.

== Council composition ==
After 2021 election		Before 2026 election	
Party	Seats	Party	Seats
Conservative	18	Conservative	13
Liberal Democrats	1	Liberal Democrats	4
Ind. Network	2	Ind. Network	3
Reform	0	Reform	2
Green	2	Green	2
Labour	1	Labour	1
Independent	13	Independent	14
Vectis Party	1	Vectis Party	0
Our Island	1	Our Island	Dissolved

== Division results ==
=== Bembridge ===
Bembridge
Party	Candidate	Votes	%	±%
Liberal Democrats	Mark Rochell	643	37.9	New
Conservative	Warren Drew	542	32.0	−35.7
Reform	Rowena Crichton-Stuart	510	30.1	New
Majority		101	5.9	
Turnout		1,703	54.3	+11.98
Liberal Democrats gain from Conservative		Swing		

=== Binstead and Fishbourne ===
Binstead and Fishbourne
Party	Candidate	Votes	%	±%
Independent	Ian Dore*	894	57.9	+2.8
Reform	Terence Wing	314	20.3	New
Conservative	Ramesh Babu	242	15.7	−11.2
Green	Alice Walker	93	6.0	New
Majority		580	37.6	
Turnout		1,544	52.8	+9.07
Independent hold		Swing		

=== Brading and St Helens ===
Brading and St Helens
Party	Candidate	Votes	%	±%
Independent	Jonathan Bacon*	780	62.9	
Reform	Tara Hill	380	30.6	
Labour	Alexander Buggie	72	5.8	
Majority		400	32.3	
Turnout		1,241	45.5	+5.34
Independent hold		Swing		

=== Brighstone, Calbourne and Shalfleet ===
Brighstone, Calbourne and Shalfleet
Party	Candidate	Votes	%	±%
Liberal Democrats	Nick Stuart	797	54.5	+25.6
Reform	Vincent Speed	469	32.0	N/A
Conservative	Kim Jeffreys	160	10.9	−32.6
Independent	Ed Surridge	37	2.5	N/A
Turnout		1466	55.7	+7.24

=== Carisbrooke and Gunville ===
Carisbrooke and Gunville
Party	Candidate	Votes	%	±%
Green	Vix Lowthion	565	46.5	+5.7
Reform	James Downard	399	32.8	New
Conservative	Mark Reen	252	20.7	−16.0
Majority		166	13.7	−9.6
Turnout		1,216	42.4	+7.6
Green hold		Swing		

=== Central Rural ===
Central Rural
Party	Candidate	Votes	%	±%
Reform	James Whelan	613	42.30	New
Conservative	Simon Richards	372	25.67	−31.75
Green	Julia Ann Laursen	352	24.29	−4.75
Independent	Caroline Gladwin	112	7.72	New
Majority		241		
Turnout		1,449	48.35	+11.2
Reform hold		Swing	37.02	

=== Chale, Niton and Shorwell ===
Chale, Niton and Shorwell
Party	Candidate	Votes	%	±%
Green	Claire Critchison*	822	51.7	−6.2
Reform	Mark Nigh	506	31.8	New
Conservative	Anne Bishop	261	16.4	−25.7
Majority		316	19.9	+4.0
Turnout		1,589	54.6	+4.0
Green hold		Swing		

=== Cowes Medina ===
Cowes Medina
Party	Candidate	Votes	%	±%
Independent	Lora Peacey-Wilcox	499	44.7	
Reform	Joe Hall	318	28.5	
Green	Dan Jeffries-Revert	214	19.2	
Conservative	Oscar Bicket	66	5.9	
Independent	Rachel Thacker	20	1.8	
Majority		181	16.2	
Turnout		1,120	37.0	+5.62
Independent hold		Swing		

=== Cowes North ===
Cowes North
Party	Candidate	Votes	%	±%
Labour	Jock Rafferty	439	35.6	
Independent	Richard Hollis	364	29.5	
Conservative	Siobhan Barney	223	18.1	
Reform	Ian Arnold	206	16.7	
Majority		75	6.1	
Turnout		1,236	44.3	+4
Labour hold		Swing		

=== Cowes South and Northwood ===
Cowes South and Northwood
Party	Candidate	Votes	%	±%
Reform	Gordon Adam	393	30.8	
Conservative	John Nicholson	363	28.5	
Independent	Monique Gallop	292	22.9	
Labour	Wayne Doidge	121	9.5	
Liberal Democrats	Bob Packham	106	8.3	
Majority		30	2.4	
Turnout		1,279	44.9	+5.12
Reform gain from Conservative		Swing		

=== Cowes West and Gurnard ===
Cowes West and Gurnard
Party	Candidate	Votes	%	±%
Independent	Paul Fuller	1,173	75.5	
Reform	Sue Whitewood	275	17.7	
Conservative	Phil Sanders	106	6.8	
Majority		898	57.8	
Turnout		1,558	52.5	+3.62
Independent hold		Swing		

=== East Cowes ===
East Cowes
Party	Candidate	Votes	%	±%
Independent	Karl Love	876	57.3	
Reform	Mark Stone	360	23.6	
Conservative	Peter Ball	156	10.2	
Green	Christopher Warleigh-Lack	136	8.9	
Majority		516	33.8	
Turnout		1,530	49.0	+7.26
Independent hold		Swing		

=== Fairlee and Whippingham ===
Fairlee and Whippingham
Party	Candidate	Votes	%	±%
Conservative	Matt Price	602	49.0	
Reform	John Wilson	380	30.9	
Green	Sophus Magill	168	13.7	
Liberal Democrats	Patricia Packham	79	6.4	
Majority		222	18.1	
Turnout		1,234	42.8	+7.63
Conservative hold		Swing		

=== Freshwater North and Yarmouth ===
Freshwater North and Yarmouth
Party	Candidate	Votes	%	±%
Reform	Debbie Conlin	422	33.9	
Independent	David Whistance	405	32.5	
Conservative	Timothy Jeffreys	197	15.8	
Green	Florence Sarlat	165	13.3	
Labour	Simon Ayre	56	4.5	
Majority		17	1.4	
Turnout		1,246	47.9	+7.3
Reform gain from Conservative		Swing		

=== Freshwater South ===
Freshwater South
Party	Candidate	Votes	%	±%
Independent	Becca Cameron	913	63.8	
Reform	Ian Pickering	395	27.6	
Green	Peta Stevenson	89	6.2	
Labour	Greta Farian	33	2.3	
Majority		518	36.2	
Turnout		1,433	48.0	+9.44
Independent hold		Swing		

=== Haylands and Swanmore ===
Haylands and Swanmore
Party	Candidate	Votes	%	±%
Reform	Les Kirkby	437	40.8	
Green	Peter Banks	203	18.9	
Conservative	Vanessa Churchman	200	18.7	
Independent	Sandy Stephens	128	11.9	
Liberal Democrats	Malcolm Ross	69	6.4	
Labour	Simon Haytack	35	3.3	
Majority		234	21.8	
Turnout		1,073	38.7	+5.98
Reform gain from Conservative		Swing		

=== Lake North ===
Lake North
Party	Candidate	Votes	%	±%
Reform	Bill Nigh	421	39.1	
Conservative	Adrian Whittaker	387	36.0	
Liberal Democrats	Bob Blezzard	176	16.4	
Labour	Jenny Hicks	92	8.6	
Majority		34	3.2	
Turnout		1,078	39.3	+7.62
Reform gain from Conservative		Swing		

=== Lake South ===
Lake South
Party	Candidate	Votes	%	±%
Reform	Ros Freeman	517	41.5	
Conservative	Paul Brading	431	34.6	
Green	Harry Eccles	224	18.0	
Labour	Finton Burns	73	5.9	
Majority		86	6.9	
Turnout		1,245	45.4	+8.49
Reform gain from Conservative		Swing		

=== Mountjoy and Shide ===
Mountjoy and Shide
Party	Candidate	Votes	%	±%
Reform	Richard Quinn	368	36.0	
Conservative	Martin Oliver	247	24.2	
Green	Stephen Rushbrook	185	18.1	
Liberal Democrats	Ray Harrington-Vail	130	12.7	
Labour	Alan Hunter	92	9.0	
Majority		121	11.8	
Turnout		1,022	38.0	+8.22
Reform gain from Conservative		Swing		

=== Nettlestone and Seaview ===
Nettlestone and Seaview
Party	Candidate	Votes	%	±%
Independent	Jules Hayward	542	44.2	
Conservative	Mouli Akundi	367	30.0	
Reform	Jennifer Holmes	251	20.5	
Green	Janet Mace	65	5.3	
Majority		175	14.3	
Turnout		1,225	51.9	+4.91
Independent hold		Swing		

=== Newchurch, Havenstreet and Ashey ===
Newchurch, Havenstreet and Ashey
Party	Candidate	Votes	%	±%
Reform	Tony Barry	638	45.2	
Conservative	Raj Patel	397	28.1	
Green	Jude Brown	330	23.4	
Labour	Anna Beach	47	3.3	
Majority		241	17.1	
Turnout		1,414	48.8	+7.74
Reform gain from Conservative		Swing		

=== Newport Central ===
Newport Central
Party	Candidate	Votes	%	±%
Independent	Julie Jones-Evans	440	48.3	
Reform	Emerson Maguire	242	26.6	
Liberal Democrats	Norman Arnold	178	19.5	
Conservative	Stephen Bird	51	5.6	
Majority		198	21.7	
Turnout		914	33.7	+7.41
Independent hold		Swing		

=== Newport West ===
Newport West
Party	Candidate	Votes	%	±%
Reform	Frank Brown	442	39.6	
Green	Chris Mace	375	33.6	
Conservative	Raymond Redrup	299	26.8	
Majority		67	6.0	
Turnout		1,123	40.0	+9.4
Reform gain from Conservative		Swing		

=== Osborne ===
Osborne
Party	Candidate	Votes	%	±%
Reform	Paul Williams	389	34.2	
Independent	Tracy Reardon	270	23.8	
Conservative	Stephen Hendry	226	19.9	
Liberal Democrats	Julie Burridge	162	14.3	
Independent	Michael Paler	89	7.8	
Majority		119	10.5	
Turnout		1,140	35.4	+6.2
Reform gain from Conservative		Swing		

=== Pan and Barton ===
Pan and Barton
Party	Candidate	Votes	%	±%
Reform	Martin Bower	397	46.2	
Labour	Stephen Reading	366	42.6	
Conservative	Brian Tyndall	97	11.3	
Majority		31	3.6	
Turnout		866	27.0	+3.2
Reform gain from Independent		Swing		

=== Parkhurst and Hunnyhill ===
Parkhurst and Hunnyhill
Party	Candidate	Votes	%	±%
Liberal Democrats	Andrew Garratt	551	61.2	+1.8
Reform	Alan Stay	349	38.8	N/A
Majority		202	22.4	
Turnout		902	33.5	+5.88
Liberal Democrats hold		Swing		

=== Ryde Appley and Elmfield ===
Ryde Appley and Elmfield
Party	Candidate	Votes	%	±%
Liberal Democrats	Michael Lilley	781	60.4	N/A
Reform	Ross Caruana	419	32.3	N/A
Conservative	Abdul Mateen	94	7.3	−4.2
Majority		362	28.0	
Turnout		1,300	42.9	+8.1
Liberal Democrats gain from Independent		Swing		

=== Ryde Monktonmead ===
Ryde Monktonmead
Party	Candidate	Votes	%	±%
Ind. Network	Karen Lucioni	404	36.0	
Reform	Chris Brown	354	31.5	
Green	Matt Walker	269	24.0	
Conservative	Sue Maddison	96	8.5	
Majority		50	4.5	
Turnout		1,127	38.8	+8.6
Ind. Network hold		Swing		

=== Ryde North West ===
Ryde North West
Party	Candidate	Votes	%	±%
Reform	Reuben Loake	401	34.4	
Green	Peter Burke	339	29.0	
Independent	Phil Jordan	255	21.9	
Conservative	Lou Temel	172	14.7	
Majority		62	5.3	
Turnout		1,171	38.4	+3.5
Reform gain from Independent		Swing		

=== Ryde South East ===
Ryde South East
Party	Candidate	Votes	%	±%
Reform	Chris Way	223	41.3	
Liberal Democrats	Jen Hughes	153	28.3	
Green	Richard Collins	82	15.2	
Labour	Stephen Double	40	7.4	
Conservative	Andy Clayton	30	5.6	
Ind. Network	Geraldine Higgins	12	2.2	
Majority		70	13.0	
Turnout		540	31.4	+9.2
Reform gain from Conservative		Swing		

=== Ryde West ===
Ryde West
Party	Candidate	Votes	%	±%
Reform	Owen Potter	355	37.0	
Green	Ethan Cass	275	28.6	
Ind. Network	Ian Stephens	273	28.4	
Conservative	Carol Brown	57	5.9	
Majority		80	8.3	
Turnout		962	37.2	+2.1
Reform gain from Ind. Network		Swing		

=== Sandown North ===
Sandown North
Party	Candidate	Votes	%	±%
Reform	Robert Newton	419	38.5	
Independent	Alex Lightfoot	325	29.9	
Independent	Debbie Andre	140	12.9	
Conservative	Joan Solomon	91	8.4	
Green	Cinnamon Noakes	76	7.0	
Labour	Clive Cheetham	37	3.4	
Majority		94	8.6	
Turnout		1,090	41.5	+6.5
Reform gain from Independent		Swing		

=== Sandown South ===
Sandown South
Party	Candidate	Votes	%	±%
Reform	Frank Baldry	358	36.5	
Independent	Paddy Lightfoot	269	27.4	
Conservative	Ian Ward	216	22.0	
Green	Christie Greenaway	96	9.8	
Labour	Emily Brothers	42	4.3	
Majority		89	9.1	
Turnout		984	36.3	+6.4
Reform gain from Conservative		Swing		

=== Shanklin Central ===
Shanklin Central
Party	Candidate	Votes	%	±%
Reform	Stephen Reynolds	356	29.6	
Conservative	Michael Beston	355	29.5	
Green	Robert May	276	22.9	
Independent	Sarah Morris	216	18.0	
Majority		1	0.1	
Turnout		1,206	42.8	+7.8
Reform gain from Conservative		Swing		

=== Shanklin South ===
Shanklin South
Party	Candidate	Votes	%	±%
Reform	David Llewellyn	526	37.2	
Conservative	Chris Quirk	419	29.6	
Independent	Billy Hill	195	13.8	
Green	Wendy Cooper	188	13.3	
Labour Co-op	Christopher Lloyd	86	6.1	
Majority		107	7.6	
Turnout		1,416	47.9	+11.9
Reform gain from Conservative		Swing		

=== Totland and Colwell ===
Totland and Colwell
Party	Candidate	Votes	%	±%
Independent	Chris Jarman*	797	51.6	+10.6
Reform	Tom Bignell	422	27.3	New
Green	John Hoath	126	8.2	New
Conservative	Michelle Abbott	114	7.4	−32.8
Labour	Paul Pugh	60	3.9	−10.6
Liberal Democrats	Eric Gray	27	1.7	−2.6
Majority		375	24.3	
Turnout		1,546	48.8	+5.2
Independent politician hold		Swing		

=== Ventnor and St Lawrence ===
Ventnor and St Lawrence
Party	Candidate	Votes	%	±%
Conservative	Ed Blake	627	45.6	
Reform	Craig Dabbs	305	22.2	
Ind. Network	Linda Jefferies	239	17.4	
Labour	Robin Jarvis	149	10.8	
Vectis Party	Graham Perks	54	3.9	
Majority		322	23.4	
Turnout		1,383	46.6	+6.6
Conservative hold		Swing		

=== Wootton Bridge ===
Wootton Bridge
Party	Candidate	Votes	%	±%
Reform	Tony Raffe	485	38.1	New
Conservative	Ed Hopper	291	22.8	−9.0
Liberal Democrats	Tony Zeid	208	16.3	New
Green	Sue Betts	141	11.1	−2.4
Vectis Party	Linda Pitcher	128	10.0	−37.3
Independent	Elisa Williams	20	1.6	New
Majority		194	15.3	
Turnout		1,274	44.9	+5.2
Reform gain from Vectis Party				

=== Wroxall, Lowtherville and Bonchurch ===
Wroxall, Lowtherville and Bonchurch
Party	Candidate	Votes	%	±%
Ind. Network	Mark Jefferies	621	45.8	
Reform	Ruby Monteath	326	24.0	
Conservative	David Groocock	234	17.4	
Green	Jonathan Idle	178	13.0	
Majority		295	21.7	
Turnout		1,362	45.0	+3.6
Ind. Network gain from Independent		Swing		

== Aftermath ==
With no party securing a majority, there was uncertainty about who would control the council. After the election, the 11 independent councillors organised themselves into the following groups: 6 Island First Network, 2 All for Islanders (subsequently including Cllr Karl Love), and 3 remained non-aligned. 5 of the 6 Island First Network were previously part of the Alliance group.

At its first meeting, the council elected Cllr Jonathan Bacon (non-aligned independent) as the new Leader of the Council, having previously served from 2015 until January 2017, when he resigned ahead of a budget-setting meeting. Despite being by far the largest party, Reform UK did not put forward a candidate, but instead backed Bacon, as did the Island First Network, and All for Islanders; Bacon received 28 votes to nine for Liberal Democrat rival Andrew Garratt, with two abstentions. At the same meeting, Reform and the Island First Network won all but one of the committee chairmanships, with Reform taking the majority. Reform also won the deputy leadership of the council, electing Cllr Bill Nigh. This all led to accusations that Reform and the Island First Network had done a deal to win control of the council, which Bacon would deny, saying "Some incorrect, and in some cases offensive, claims have been made of deals being done or arrangements being made prior to the council meeting on Wednesday evening. Such assertions are false and unnecessary."

== See also ==
- Isle of Wight Council elections
