= 1981 Isle of Wight County Council election =

1981 UK local government election

Local elections of 1981 to the Isle of Wight County Council, a county council in south east England, were held on 7 May 1981. The whole council was up for election, with boundary changes since the last election in 1977, which increased the number of seats by one. The election resulted in a council with Liberal members holding more than half of the seats.

== Election result ==
Isle of Wight County Council election result 1981
Party	Seats	Gains	Losses	Net gain/loss	Seats %	Votes %	Votes	+/−
Liberal	27			▲20	62.8	50.4%	22,482	
Conservative	12			▼11	27.9	34.0%	15,150	
Independent	4			▼4	9.3	22.8%	10,146	
Labour	0			▼1	0.0	4.7%	2,081	
RA	0			▼3	0.0	1.3%	565	
Independent Liberal	0			Steady	0.0	1.0%	465	

This result had the following consequences for the total number of seats on the council after the elections:

Party	Previous council	New council
Liberal	7	27
Conservatives	23	12
Independent	8	4
Residents	3	0
Labour	1	0
Total	42	43
Working majority	4	11

== Ward results ==
=== Arreton & Newchurch ===
Arreton & Newchurch
Party	Candidate	Votes	%	±%
Liberal	M. Lanfear	672	59.4	N/A
Conservative	P. Jarrett	459	40.6	N/A
Majority		213	18.8	
Turnout		1,131	51.9	
Liberal win (new seat)				

=== Ashey ===
Ashey
Party	Candidate	Votes	%	±%
Liberal	G. Wilson	613	57.5	N/A
Conservative	F. Winter	374	35.1	N/A
Labour	L. Cuthbert	80	7.5	N/A
Majority		239	22.4	
Turnout		1,067	53.6	
Liberal win (new seat)				

=== Bembridge ===
Bembridge
Party	Candidate	Votes	%	±%
Conservative	R. Rowsell	1,064	63.3	▼8.1
Liberal	A. Naylor	562	33.4	N/A
Labour	S. Sutters	56	3.3	N/A
Majority		502	29.9	
Turnout		1,682	54.8	
Conservative hold		Swing		

=== Binstead ===
Binstead
Party	Candidate	Votes	%	±%
Conservative	R. Jewitt	519	52.6	N/A
Liberal	M. Perfitt	468	47.4	N/A
Majority		51	5.2	
Turnout		987	48.2	
Liberal win (new seat)				

=== Brading ===
Brading
Party	Candidate	Votes	%	±%
Conservative	Janusz Trzebski	Unopposed	N/A	N/A
Conservative hold		Swing	N/A	

=== Brighstone & Shorwell ===
Brighstone & Shorwell
Party	Candidate	Votes	%	±%
Liberal	P. Leyton	561	50.4	N/A
Conservative	A. Currie	504	45.3	N/A
Labour	D. White	48	4.3	N/A
Majority		57	5.1	
Turnout		1,113	63.8	
Liberal win (new seat)				

=== Calbourne Shalfleet & Yarmouth ===
Calbourne Shalfleet & Yarmouth
Party	Candidate	Votes	%	±%
Conservative	S. Laird	746	51.0	N/A
Liberal	J. Hancock	717	49.0	N/A
Majority		29	2.0	
Turnout		1,463	53.9	
Conservative win (new seat)				

=== Carisbrooke East ===
Carisbrooke East
Party	Candidate	Votes	%	±%
Liberal	Stephen Ross	404	71.6	N/A
Conservative	P. Dobson	148	49.0	N/A
Labour	R. Jones	12	2.1	N/A
Majority		256	22.6	
Turnout		564	45.4	
Conservative win (new seat)				

=== Carisbrooke West ===
Carisbrooke West
Party	Candidate	Votes	%	±%
Liberal	J. Kitchington	902	93.9	N/A
Labour	R. Stringer	59	6.1	N/A
Majority		843	87.7	
Turnout		961	47.2	
Liberal win (new seat)				

=== Chale & Niton ===
Chale & Niton
Party	Candidate	Votes	%	±%
Conservative	P. Fradgley	682	52.6	N/A
Liberal	D. Waddleton	575	44.4	N/A
Labour	C. Sullivan	39	3.0	N/A
Majority		107	8.2	
Turnout		1,296	58.3	
Conservative win (new seat)				

=== Cowes Castle ===
Cowes Castle
Party	Candidate	Votes	%	±%
Liberal	C. Carter	904	58.7	N/A
Conservative	S. Flynn	635	41.3	▼58.7
Majority		269	17.4	
Turnout		1,539	52.9	
Liberal gain from Conservative		Swing		

=== Cowes Central ===
Cowes Central
Party	Candidate	Votes	%	±%
Liberal	D. Lennox	586	52.2	N/A
Independent	N. Butchers	481	42.8	▼57.2
Labour	P. Ray	56	5.0	N/A
Majority		105	9.4	
Turnout		1,123	59.3	
Liberal gain from Independent		Swing		

=== Cowes Medina ===
Cowes Medina
Party	Candidate	Votes	%	±%
Liberal	E. Bird	815	72.3	N/A
Labour	S. Smith	170	15.1	▼33.6
Conservative	M. Billington	142	12.6	▼38.7
Majority		645	57.2	
Turnout		1,127	56.9	
Liberal gain from Conservative		Swing		

=== East Cowes ===
East Cowes
Party	Candidate	Votes	%	±%
Independent	H. Moon	713	61.0	▲8.3
Independent Liberal	A. Guy	456	39.0	N/A
Majority		257	22.0	
Turnout		1,169	43.2	
Independent hold		Swing		

=== Fairlee ===
Fairlee
Party	Candidate	Votes	%	±%
Liberal	P. Breach	698	65.4	
Conservative	R. Dixon	332	31.1	▼20.0
Labour	D. Wood	38	3.6	
Majority		366	34.3	
Turnout		1,068	53.9	
Liberal gain from Conservative		Swing		

=== Freshwater Afton ===
Freshwater Afton
Party	Candidate	Votes	%	±%
Conservative	E. Le Brecht	652	51.3	N/A
Liberal	J. Cooper	619	48.7	N/A
Majority		33	2.6	
Turnout		1,271	61.3	
Conservative win (new seat)				

=== Freshwater Norton ===
Freshwater Norton
Party	Candidate	Votes	%	±%
Conservative	A. Parker	484	42.4	N/A
Liberal	A. Smith	465	40.8	N/A
Liberal	B. Fitzsimmons	192	16.8	N/A
Majority		19	1.6	
Turnout		1,141	53.6	
Conservative win (new seat)				

=== Gatcombe & Godshill ===
Gatcombe & Godshill
Party	Candidate	Votes	%	±%
Conservative	R. Westmore	574	54.3	N/A
Liberal	A. Smith	484	45.7	N/A
Majority		90	8.6	
Turnout		1,058	57.4	
Conservative win (new seat)				

=== Gurnard ===
Gurnard
Party	Candidate	Votes	%	±%
Liberal	S. Sutherland	525	53.0	N/A
Conservative	M. Halpin	466	47.0	N/A
Majority		59	6.0	
Turnout		991	57.4	
Liberal win (new seat)				

=== Mount Joy ===
Mount Joy
Party	Candidate	Votes	%	±%
Liberal	R. Smith	747	55.8	▲8.7
Conservative	E. Giles	506	37.8	▼15.1
Labour	C. Wilson	85	6.4	N/A
Majority		241	18.0	
Turnout		1,338	50.5	
Liberal gain from Conservative		Swing		

=== Nettlestone & St. Helens ===
Nettlestone & St.Helens
Party	Candidate	Votes	%	±%
Liberal	S. Rains	796	51.3	N/A
Conservative	L. Hollis	707	45.6	N/A
Labour	E. Kitchen	48	3.1	N/A
Majority		89	5.7	
Turnout		1,551	66.5	
Liberal gain from Independent		Swing		

=== Newport Central ===
Newport Central
Party	Candidate	Votes	%	±%
Liberal	R. Rowsell	791	63.5	▲8.0
Conservative	J. Tungate	401	32.2	▼12.3
Labour	L. O'Flaherty	54	4.3	N/A
Majority		390	31.3	
Turnout		1,246	51.0	
Liberal hold		Swing		

=== Northwood ===
Northwood
Party	Candidate	Votes	%	±%
Liberal	B. Drake	894	74.1	▲32.1
Conservative	J. Powe	259	21.5	▼23.7
Labour	P. Millar	53	4.4	▼8.4
Majority		635	52.6	
Turnout		1,206	72.5	
Liberal hold		Swing		

=== Osborne ===
Osborne
Party	Candidate	Votes	%	±%
Liberal	J. Augustus	869	69.7	N/A
Labour	S. Glossop	377	30.3	▼21.3
Majority		108	39.4	
Turnout		1,246	49.4	
Liberal gain from Labour		Swing		

=== Pan ===
Pan
Party	Candidate	Votes	%	±%
Liberal	M. Barton	897	67.3	▲18.8
Labour	A. Beere	261	19.6	▼4.4
Conservative	A. Jenner	175	13.1	▼14.4
Majority		636	47.7	
Turnout		1,263	56.0	
Liberal hold		Swing		

=== Parkhurst ===
Parkhurst
Party	Candidate	Votes	%	±%
Liberal	B. Pratt	679	66.8	▲13.7
Conservative	D. Eden	280	27.5	▼19.4
Labour	A. Jenner	58	5.7	N/A
Majority		399	39.3	
Turnout		1,017	40.9	
Liberal hold		Swing		

=== Ryde North East ===
Ryde North East
Party	Candidate	Votes	%	±%
Liberal	P. White	664	58.2	N/A
Conservative	N. Bartholomew	412	36.1	N/A
Labour	P. Westmore	64	5.6	N/A
Majority		252	22.1	
Turnout		1,140	45.7	
Liberal gain from Independent		Swing		

=== Ryde North West ===
Ryde North West
Party	Candidate	Votes	%	±%
Independent	E. Minghella	471	51.8	▲4.7
Conservative	L. Sharp	438	48.2	▼4.7
Majority		33	3.6	
Turnout		909	39.9	
Independent gain from Conservative		Swing		

=== Ryde South East ===
Ryde South East
Party	Candidate	Votes	%	±%
Liberal	J. Williams	Unopposed	N/A	N/A
Liberal hold		Swing		

=== Ryde South West ===
Ryde South West
Party	Candidate	Votes	%	±%
Liberal	M. Robinson	682	61.5	N/A
Conservative	D. Harley	321	28.9	▼18.1
Labour	R. Scholes	106	9.6	▼6.8
Majority		361	32.6	
Turnout		1,109	47.1	
Liberal gain from Conservative		Swing		

=== Sandown Lake ===
Sandown Lake
Party	Candidate	Votes	%	±%
Liberal	P. Harris	775	53.4	N/A
RA	G. Buttle	565	38.9	N/A
Labour	I. Williams	111	7.6	N/A
Majority		210	14.5	
Turnout		1,451	44.4	
Liberal win (new seat)				

=== Sandown North ===
Sandown North
Party	Candidate	Votes	%	±%
Independent	W. Gray	Unopposed	N/A	N/A
Independent hold		Swing		

=== Sandown South ===
Sandown South
Party	Candidate	Votes	%	±%
Liberal	P. Davis	366	52.9	N/A
Conservative	T. Findon	326	47.1	▼18.1
Majority		40	5.8	
Turnout		692	48.9	
Liberal hold		Swing		

=== Seaview & Appley ===
Seaview & Appley
Party	Candidate	Votes	%	±%
Conservative	A. Hersey	805	62.8	N/A
Liberal	R. Hayes	476	37.2	N/A
Majority		329	25.6	
Turnout		1,281	52.5	
Liberal win (new seat)				

=== Shanklin Central ===
Shanklin Central
Party	Candidate	Votes	%	±%
Liberal	G. Cassidy	480	50.9	N/A
Conservative	J. Holmes	463	49.1	N/A
Majority		17	1.8	
Turnout		943	41.9	
Liberal win (new seat)				

=== Shanklin North ===
Shanklin North
Party	Candidate	Votes	%	±%
Liberal	H. Howe	427	60.6	▲21.8
Independent	G. Orchard	245	34.8	▼4.3
Labour	C. Cotton	33	4.7	N/A
Majority		182	25.8	
Turnout		705	40.6	
Liberal gain from Independent		Swing		

=== Shanklin South ===
Shanklin South
Party	Candidate	Votes	%	±%
Conservative	F. Fry	Unopposed	N/A	N/A
Conservative hold		Swing	N/A	

=== St. Lawrence & Lowther ===
St. Lawrence & Lowther
Party	Candidate	Votes	%	±%
Conservative	D. Ross	365	37.2	▼31.5
Liberal	D. Orchard	349	35.5	N/A
Independent	T. Norton	268	27.3	N/A
Majority		16	1.7	
Turnout		982	63.5	
Conservative hold		Swing		

=== St. Johns ===
St. Johns
Party	Candidate	Votes	%	±%
Liberal	E. Jarman	533	54.0	N/A
Independent	B. Heath	311	31.5	N/A
Labour	B. Waters	81	8.2	N/A
Independent	R. Allen	62	6.3	N/A
Majority		222	22.5	
Turnout		987	39.0	
Liberal gain from Conservative		Swing		

=== Totland ===
Totland
Party	Candidate	Votes	%	±%
Conservative	T. Cokes	868	78.8	
Liberal	A. Brewer	233	21.2	▼15.9
Majority		635	57.6	
Turnout		1,101	60.0	
Conservative gain from RA		Swing		

=== Ventnor Central ===
Ventnor Central
Party	Candidate	Votes	%	±%
Liberal	P. Graham-Stewart	878	60.3	▲11.8
Conservative	R. Farthing	578	39.7	▼2.6
Majority		300	20.6	
Turnout		1,456	49.4	
Liberal hold		Swing		

=== Wootton ===
Wootton
Party	Candidate	Votes	%	±%
Liberal	M. Stolworthy	841	64.4	N/A
Conservative	R. Garbett	465	35.6	N/A
Majority		376	28.8	
Turnout		1,306	55.5	
Liberal win (new seat)				

=== Wroxall & Bonchurch ===
Wroxall & Bonchurch
Party	Candidate	Votes	%	±%
Liberal	E. Crossley	437	52.8	▲15.8
Independent	A. Wadsworth	390	47.2	▼15.8
Majority		47	5.6	
Turnout		827	53.3	
Liberal gain from Independent		Swing		

== See also ==
- Politics of the Isle of Wight
- Isle of Wight Council elections
