= Medina Borough Council elections =

Local government elections in the Isle of Wight, England

Medina was a non-metropolitan district in Isle of Wight, England. It was abolished on 1 April 1995 and replaced by Isle of Wight Council.

== Political control ==
From the first election to the council in 1973 until its abolition in 1995, political control of the council was held by the following parties:

Party in control	Years
No overall control	1973–1979
Liberal	1979–1981
Alliance	1981–1987
Conservative	1987–1991
No overall control	1991–1995

== Council elections ==
- 1973 Medina Borough Council election
- 1976 Medina Borough Council election
- 1979 Medina Borough Council election (New ward boundaries)
- 1983 Medina Borough Council election
- 1987 Medina Borough Council election (Borough boundary changes took place but the number of seats remained the same)
- 1991 Medina Borough Council election
