= 2021 Isle of Wight Council election =

2021 UK local government election

- 6 May 2021

All 39 seats to the Isle of Wight Council 20 seats needed for a majority
- Turnout: 36.93% ▼3.99 pp

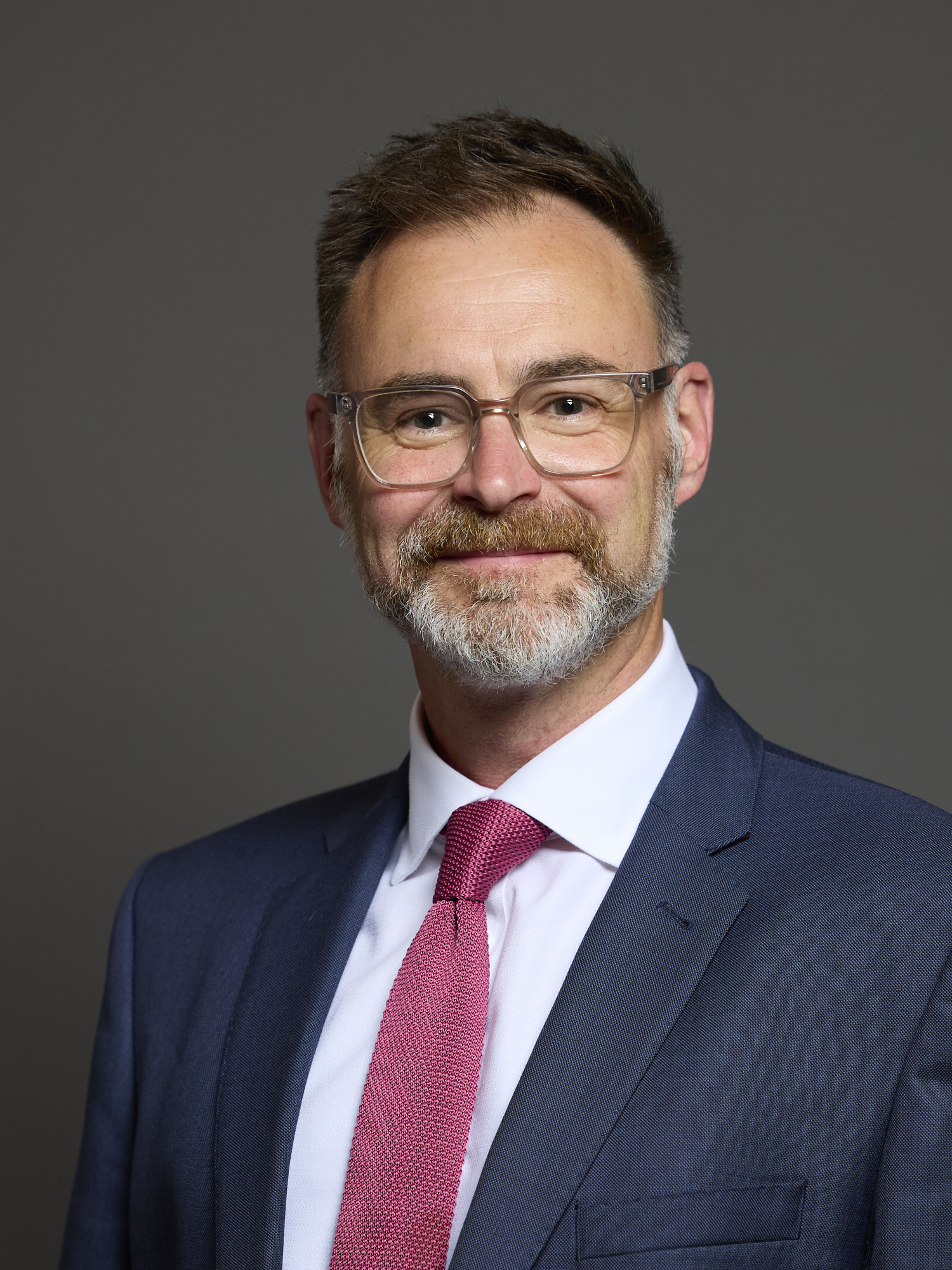

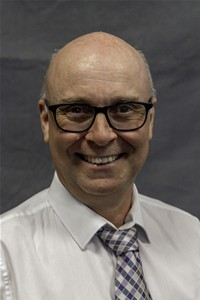

	First party	Second party	Third party
Leader	Dave Stewart
Party	Conservative	Independent	Green
Leader's seat	Chale, Niton and Shorwell (lost)
Last election	25 seats, 41.3%	11 seats, 28.2%	1 seats, 12.6%
Seats before	23	14	1
Seats won	18	13	2
Seat change	▼7	▲2	▲1
Popular vote	15,825	9,981	4,541
Percentage	38.7%	24.4%	11.1%
Swing	▼2.6%	▼3.8%	▼1.5%
	Fourth party	Fifth party	Sixth party
Leader	Ian Stephens	Richard Quigley	Andrew Garratt
Party	Island Independent Network	Labour	Liberal Democrats
Leader's seat	Ryde West	Cowes North	Parkhurst and Hunnyhill
Last election	New grouping	1 seat, 9.7%	2 seats, 6.2%
Seats before	1	1	1
Seats won	2	1	1
Seat change	▲2	Steady	▼1
Popular vote	1,327	4,760	2,139
Percentage	3.2%	11.6%	5.2%
Swing	▲3.2%	▲1.9%	▼1.0%
	Seventh party	Eighth party
Leader	Jonathan Bacon	Daryll Pitcher
Party	Our Island	Vectis Party
Leader's seat	Brading and St Helens	Wootton Bridge
Last election	New party	New party
Seats won	1	1
Seat change	▲1	▲1
Popular vote	1,427	886
Percentage	3.5%	2.2%
Swing	▲3.5%	▲2.2%
- Election results
Council leader before election
Dave Stewart
Conservative
Council leader after election
Lora Peacey-Wilcox
The Alliance Group

Elections to Isle of Wight Council took place on 6 May 2021 as part of the 2021 United Kingdom local elections. These were held at the same time as the elections for the Hampshire Police and Crime Commissioner. The elections saw the Conservatives lose control of the council, losing seats against the national trend for the party.

== Results summary ==
Party	Seats		Candidates	Votes		Vote %	
Conservative	18	▼7	39	15,825	▼2,552	38.7	▼2.6
Independent	13	▲2	22	9,981	▲2,527	24.4	▼3.8
Green	2	▲1	19	4,541	▼1,056	11.1	▼1.5
Island Independent Network	2	▲2	6	1,327	▲1,327	3.2	▲3.2
Labour	1	Steady	28	4,760	▲452	11.6	▲1.9
Lib Dem	1	▼1	12	2,139	▼636	5.2	▼1.0
Our Island	1	▲1	5	1,427	▲1,427	3.5	▲3.5
Vectis Party	1	▲1	3	886	▲886	2.2	▲2.2
Freedom Alliance	0	Steady	1	38	▲38	0.09	▲0.09
TUSC	0	Steady	1	20	▲20	0.05	▲0.05
Total	39	▼1	136	40,944	▼608		

== Background ==
New ward divisions were used for this election, with thirty wards changing, with the number of wards reduced by one to 39 single-member seats. In the previous election, the Conservatives had won a majority with twenty five seats, with Independents (including the Island Independent Group), Liberal Democrats, Greens, and Labour also winning seats.

For the 2021 election, as well as existing independent candidates, the new Our Island also announced its intention to support several independent candidates.

== Aftermath ==
The incumbent Conservative leader of the council lost his seat to the Green Party, and was replaced as group leader by Steve Hastings, who subsequently invited other councillors to coalition talks.

On 26 May, independent councillor Lora Peacey-Wilcox was elected leader of the council with 20 votes to Hastings’s 18. There was a single abstention from the Labour councillor, who was absent. Island Independent Network councillor Ian Stephens was elected her deputy. Independent councillor Geoff Brodie was elected as the Chair of the Council, with Green councillor Claire Critchison elected Vice-Chair.

The leadership and cabinet - termed the "Alliance Group" - includes Independent, Green, Island Independent Network and Our Island councillors who together make up 18 of the 39 seats on the council. With the additional external support from the Liberal Democrats and the Vectis Party this constitutes a majority of 20 out of the 39 council seats.

In August 2021, Cllr Brodie quit the Alliance Group over planning issues, but continues to support the administration.

== Division results ==
=== Bembridge ===
Bembridge
Party	Candidate	Votes	%	±%
Conservative	Joe Robertson	921	67.67	−
Our Island	Alasdair Steane	440	32.33	−
Majority		481	35.34	−
Turnout		1,361	42.32	−

=== Binstead and Fishbourne ===
Binstead and Fishbourne
Party	Candidate	Votes	%	±%
Independent	Ian Dore	701	55.11	−
Conservative	Ed Hopper	401	31.53	−
No Description	Simon Cooke	170	13.36	−
Majority		300	23.58	−
Turnout		1,272	43.73	−

=== Brading and St Helens ===
Brading and St Helens
Party	Candidate	Votes	%	±%
Our Island	Jonathan Bacon	537	48.03	-
Conservative	Brian Tyndall	383	34.26	−
Liberal Democrats	John Graney	107	9.57	−
Labour	Alexander Buggie	91	8.14	−
Majority		154	13.77	−
Turnout		1,118	40.16	−

=== Brighstone, Calbourne and Shalfleet ===
Brighstone, Calbourne and Shalfleet
Party	Candidate	Votes	%	±%
Conservative	Steve Hastings	549	43.54	−
Liberal Democrats	Nick Stuart	377	28.90	−
Green	Doug Alldred	335	26.57	−
Majority		172	13.64	−
Turnout		1,261	48.46	−

=== Carisbrooke and Gunville ===
Carisbrooke and Gunville
Party	Candidate	Votes	%	±%
Green	Joe Lever	387	40.78	−
Conservative	Bev Hastings	348	36.67	−
Labour	Verity Bird	214	22.55	−
Majority		39	4.11	−
Turnout		949	34.75	−

=== Central Rural ===
Central Rural
Party	Candidate	Votes	%	±%
Conservative	Suzie Ellis	619	57.42	−
Green	Julia Laursen	313	29.04	−
Labour	Richard Hill	146	13.54	−
Majority		306	28.38	−
Turnout		1,078	37.15	−

=== Chale, Niton and Shorwell ===
Chale, Niton and Shorwell
Party	Candidate	Votes	%	±%
Green	Claire Critchison	876	57.94	−
Conservative	Dave Stewart	636	42.06	−
Majority		240	15.87	−
Turnout		1,512	50.64	−

=== Cowes Medina ===
Cowes Medina
Party	Candidate	Votes	%	±%
Independent	Laura Peacey-Wilcox	615	63.33	−
Labour	Alan Bates	213	21.94	−
Conservative	Oscar Bicket	143	14.72	−
Majority		402	41.4	−
Turnout		971	31.38	−

=== Cowes North ===
Cowes North
Party	Candidate	Votes	%	±%
Labour	Richard Quigley	587	51.53	−
Conservative	Richard Hollis	552	48.46	−
Majority		35	3.07	−
Turnout		1,139	40.30	−

=== Cowes South and Northwood ===
Cowes South and Northwood
Party	Candidate	Votes	%	±%
Conservative	John Nicholson	502	43.84	−
Liberal Democrats	Steph Burgess	278	24.28	−
Labour	Philip Attfield	223	19.48	−
Green	Nathan Stubbings	142	12.40	−
Majority		224	19.56	−
Turnout		1,145	39.78	−

=== Cowes West and Gurnard ===
Cowes West and Gurnard
Party	Candidate	Votes	%	±%
Independent	Paul Fuller	1,101	77.37	−
Conservative	Tim Jeffreys	208	14.61	−
Labour	Josh Pointing	114	8.01	−
Majority		893	62.75	−
Turnout		1,423	48.88	−

=== East Cowes ===
East Cowes
Party	Candidate	Votes	%	±%
Independent	Karl Love	809	60.60	−
Conservative	Jane Rann	335	25.09	−
Liberal Democrats	Bob Packham	96	7.19	−
Labour	Lorna Trollope	95	7.12	−
Majority		474	35.23	−
Turnout		1,335	41.74	−

=== Fairlee and Whippingham ===
Fairlee and Whippingham
Party	Candidate	Votes	%	±%
Conservative	Matthew Price	669	64.70	−
Green	Michael Smith	249	24.08	−
Liberal Democrats	Patricia Packham	116	11.22	−
Majority		420	40.62	−
Turnout		1,034	35.17	−

=== Freshwater North and Yarmouth ===
Freshwater North and Yarmouth
Party	Candidate	Votes	%	±%
Conservative	Peter Spink	644	59.74	−
Green	Daniel James	434	40.26	−
Majority		210	19.49	−
Turnout		1,078	40.60	−

=== Freshwater South ===
Freshwater South
Party	Candidate	Votes	%	±%
Independent	John Medland	625	52.04	−
Conservative	George Cameron	576	47.96	−
Majority		49	4.08	−
Turnout		1,201	38.56	−

=== Haylands and Swanmore ===
Haylands and Swanmore
Party	Candidate	Votes	%	±%
Conservative	Vanessa Churchman	316	35.27	−
No Description	Les Kirkby	302	33.71	−
Liberal Democrats	Malcolm Ross	145	16.18	−
Labour	Sue Lyons	133	14.84	−
Majority		14	1.56	−
Turnout		896	32.72	−

=== Lake North ===
Lake North
Party	Candidate	Votes	%	±%
Conservative	Tig Outlaw	399	43.85	−
Island Independent Network	Adrian Whittaker	284	31.21	−
Labour	Gary Clarke	135	14.84	−
Green	Paul Wilson	92	10.11	−
Majority		115	12.64	−
Turnout		910	31.62	−

=== Lake South ===
Lake South
Party	Candidate	Votes	%	±%
Conservative	Paul Brading	607	56.78	−
Labour	Sarah McCarthy-Fry	210	19.64	−
Green	Patrick Barry	159	14.87	−
Vectis Party	Linda Pitcher	93	8.70	−
Majority		397	37.14	−
Turnout		1,069	36.91	−

=== Mountjoy and Shide ===
Mountjoy and Shide
Party	Candidate	Votes	%	±%
Conservative	Martin Oliver	389	47.38	−
No Description	Shirley Smart	230	28.01	−
Labour	Alan Hunter	178	21.68	−
No Description	Fred Turgut	24	2.92	−
Majority		159	19.37	−
Turnout		821	29.78	−

=== Nettlestone and Seaview ===
Nettlestone and Seaview
Party	Candidate	Votes	%	±%
Independent	David Adams	577	50.35	−
Conservative	Michael Ward	506	44.15	−
Labour	Mark Rees	63	5.50	−
Majority		71	6.20	−
Turnout		1,146	46.99	−

=== Newchurch, Havenstreet and Ashey ===
Newchurch, Havenstreet and Ashey
Party	Candidate	Votes	%	±%
Conservative	Clare Mosdell	721	60.79	−
Green	Martyn Ridgley	186	15.86	−
Independent	Stephen Reynolds	151	12.73	−
Labour	Anna Beach	128	10.79	−
Majority		535	45.07	−
Turnout		1,187	41.06	−

=== Newport Central ===
Newport Central
Party	Candidate	Votes	%	±%
Independent	Julie Jones-Evans	349	49.57	−
Conservative	Matthew Ambrosini	134	19.03	−
Labour	Simon Haytack	119	16.90	−
Green	Stephen Rushbrook	102	14.49	−
Majority		215	30.45	−
Turnout		706	26.29	−

=== Newport West ===
Newport West
Party	Candidate	Votes	%	±%
Conservative	Ray Redrup	320	36.82	−
Labour	Brian Quigley	195	22.44	−
Green	Jaimie Bundell	169	19.45	−
Liberal Democrats	Bob Blezzard	165	18.99	−
TUSC	Bill Collins	20	2.30	−
Majority		125	14.29	−
Turnout		875	30.6	−

=== Osborne ===
Osborne
Party	Candidate	Votes	%	±%
Conservative	Stephen Hendry	297	32.53	−
Green	Cameron Palin	293	32.09	−
Independent	Michael Paler	225	24.64	−
Liberal Democrats	Julie Burridge	98	10.73	−
Majority		4	0.4	−
Turnout		920	29.2	−

=== Pan and Barton ===
Pan and Barton
Party	Candidate	Votes	%	±%
Independent	Geoff Brodie	518	77.43	−
Conservative	Danielle Fleet	151	22.57	−
Majority		367	54.45	−
Turnout		674	23.8	−

=== Parkhurst and Hunnyhill ===
Parkhurst and Hunnyhill
Party	Candidate	Votes	%	±%
Liberal Democrats	Andrew Garratt	449	59.39	−
Conservative	Cara Lock	179	23.68	−
Green	Hollie Fallick	79	10.45	−
Labour	Pauline Hunter	49	6.48	−
Majority		270	35.57	−
Turnout		759	27.62	−

=== Ryde Appley and Elmfield ===
Ryde Appley and Elmfield
Party	Candidate	Votes	%	±%
No Description	Michael Lilley	832	78.34	-
Conservative	Tiarnan Finney	121	11.39	−
Green	Paul Hampton	109	10.26	−
Majority		711	66.6	−
Turnout		1,067	34.8	−

=== Ryde Monktonmead ===
Ryde Monktonmead
Party	Candidate	Votes	%	±%
Island Independent Network	Karen Lucioni	354	39.6	-
Conservative	Rhys Wright	193	21.6	−
Labour	Mick Lyons	177	19.8	−
Independent	Charles Chapman	169	18.9	−
Majority		161	17.7	−
Turnout		909	30.2	−

=== Ryde North West ===
Ryde North West
Party	Candidate	Votes	%	±%
No Description	Phil Jordan	428	39.7	-
Conservative	Steven Sheridan	300	27.8	−
Labour	Phil Truckel	176	16.3	−
Green	Michael Salmon	175	16.2	−
Majority		128	11.7	−
Turnout		1,097	34.9	−

=== Ryde South East ===
Ryde South East
Party	Candidate	Votes	%	±%
Conservative	Warren Drew	112	29.1	−
Labour	Emily Brothers	78	20.3	−
Island Independent Network	Jessica Higgins	66	17.1	−
Green	Natalie Thomas	65	16.9	−
Liberal Democrats	Tracy Mikich	64	16.6	−
Majority		34	8.7	−
Turnout		389	22.2	−

=== Ryde West ===
Ryde West
Party	Candidate	Votes	%	±%
Island Independent Network	Ian Stephens	346	37.4	-
Conservative	Lou Temel	245	26.5	−
Labour	Steve Double	210	22.7	−
Independent	Mike Lambert	124	13.4	−
Majority		101	10.7	−
Turnout		941	35.1	−

=== Sandown North ===
Sandown North
Party	Candidate	Votes	%	±%
Independent	Debbie Andre	386	41.1	−
Conservative	Ian Fletcher	336	35.7	−
Labour	Clive Cheetham	160	17.0	−
Independent	Stephen Parkes	58	6.2	−
Majority		50	5.3	−
Turnout		948	35.0	−

=== Sandown South ===
Sandown South
Party	Candidate	Votes	%	±%
Conservative	Ian Ward	359	42.9	−
Liberal Democrats	Mark Voller	185	22.1	−
Island Independent Network	Jenny Hicks	106	12.7	−
Labour	Robert Thompson	106	12.7	−
Our Island	Pauline Evans	81	9.7	−
Majority		174	20.6	−
Turnout		846	29.9	−

=== Shanklin Central ===
Shanklin Central
Party	Candidate	Votes	%	±%
Conservative	Michael Beston	504	50.4	−
Green	David Moorse	224	22.4	−
Independent	Robert May	143	14.3	−
Labour	Kenneth Crawley	129	12.9	−
Majority		280	27.7	−
Turnout		1,010	35.0	−

=== Shanklin South ===
Shanklin South
Party	Candidate	Votes	%	±%
Conservative	Chris Quirk	658	61.1	−
Labour	Christopher Lloyd	228	21.2	−
Our Island	Mike Hailston	191	17.7	−
Majority		430	39.7	−
Turnout		1,084	36.0	−

=== Totland and Colwell ===
Totland and Colwell
Party	Candidate	Votes	%	±%
Independent	Chris Jarman	557	41.0	−
Conservative	Carol Bryan	547	40.2	−
Labour	Billy Hancock	197	14.5	−
Liberal Democrats	Michael Locke	59	4.3	−
Majority		10	0.7	−
Turnout		1,368	43.6	−

=== Ventnor and St Lawrence ===
Ventnor and St Lawrence
Party	Candidate	Votes	%	±%
Conservative	Gary Peace	328	26.8	−
Vectis Party	Graham Perks	260	21.2	−
Labour	Steve Cooper	249	20.3	−
Our Island	Phil Warren	178	14.5	−
Island Independent Network	Mark Jefferies	171	14.0	
Freedom Alliance	Martin Godden	38	3.1	−
Majority		68	5.5	−
Turnout		1,231	40.0	−

=== Wootton Bridge ===
Wootton Bridge
Party	Candidate	Votes	%	±%
Vectis Party	Daryll Pitcher	533	47.3	-
Conservative	Barry Abraham	358	31.8	−
Green	Susan Betts	152	13.5	−
No Description	John Ward	83	7.4	−
Majority		175	15.4	−
Turnout		1,136	39.7	−

=== Wroxall, Lowtherville and Bonchurch ===
Wroxall, Lowtherville and Bonchurch
Party	Candidate	Votes	%	±%
Independent	Rodney Downer	862	67.5	−
Conservative	Colm Watling	259	20.3	−
Labour	Justin Tracey	157	12.3	−
Majority		603	47.0	−
Turnout		1,283	41.4	−

== Changes 2021–2026 ==
- Michael Lilley, elected as an independent, joined the Liberal Democrats in May 2023.
- Clare Mosdell, elected as a Conservative, left the party to sit as an independent in August 2025, having previously led the Conservative group on the council.
- The Our Island party deregistered on 15 October 2025; its sole councillor, Jonathan Bacon, continued to sit as an independent.
- In February 2026, independent councillors Geoff Brodie and Clare Mosdell formed a new group, Very Broad Church, for tactical collaboration in the final months of the term.
- In February 2026, Reform UK removed the whip from Caroline Gladwin (Central Rural) following an internal investigation; the whip was restored in March, but she was not selected to stand for the party again and contested the 2026 election as an independent.
- In February 2026, independent councillor Ian Dore (council chair) left the Alliance group, citing his responsibility to run council meetings fairly and impartially.

=== By-elections ===
==== Brighstone, Calbourne and Shalfleet ====
Brighstone, Calbourne and Shalfleet
Party	Candidate	Votes	%	±%
Liberal Democrats	Nick Stuart	526	53.40	+24.50
Conservative	Carol Bryan	239	24.26	−19.28
Green	Doug Alldred	153	15.53	−11.04
Vectis Party	Stephen Parkes	36	3.65	N/A
Labour	Gary Clarke	31	3.15	N/A
Majority		287	29.14	−
Turnout		986	37.75	−
Liberal Democrats gain from Conservative		Swing		

A by-election was held in Brighstone, Calbourne and Shalfleet on 24 November 2022, triggered by the resignation of Conservative councillor Steve Hastings.

==== Wootton Bridge ====
Wootton Bridge
Party	Candidate	Votes	%	±%
Liberal Democrats	Sarah Redrup	475	47.88	N/A
Conservative	Ed Hopper	291	29.33	−2.18
Vectis Party	Linda Pitcher	178	17.94	−28.98
Green	Michael Smith	48	4.84	−8.54
Majority		184	18.55	−
Turnout		994	35.12	−
Liberal Democrats gain from Vectis Party		Swing		

A by-election was held in Wootton Bridge on 24 August 2023, triggered by the resignation of Daryll Pitcher, the leader and only elected member of the Vectis Party, after being imprisoned for rape.

==== Ventnor and St Lawrence ====
Ventnor and St Lawrence
Party	Candidate	Votes	%	±%
Conservative	Ed Blake	274	41.08%	+14.3
Labour	Steve Cooper	248	37.18%	+16.9
Liberal Democrats	Ray Harrington-Vail	145	21.74%	+21.7
Majority		26	3.9	−1.6 pp
Turnout		669	22.4	−
Conservative hold		Swing		

A by-election was held in Ventnor and St Lawrence on 21 December 2023, triggered by the resignation of Conservative councillor Gary Peace.

==== Central Rural ====
Central Rural
Party	Candidate	Votes	%	±%
Reform	Caroline Gladwin	410	39.8%	New
Conservative	Simon Richards	220	21.4%	−36.0
Green	Julia Laursen	219	21.3%	−7.7
Liberal Democrats	Bob Blezzard	146	14.2%	New
Labour	Simon Haytack	34	3.3%	−10.2
Majority		190	18.4	
Turnout		1,036	35.23	−
Reform gain from Conservative		Swing		

A by-election was held in Central Rural on 1 May 2025, triggered by the resignation of Conservative councillor Suzy Ellis.

==== Freshwater South ====
Freshwater South
Party	Candidate	Votes	%	±%
Independent	Rebecca Cameron	472	42.1%	New
Reform	Bill Nigh	269	24.6%	New
Conservative	Warren Whyte	147	13.4%	−34.6
Independent	Emma Cox	105	9.6%	New
Labour	Anne Bamford	74	6.8%	New
Liberal Democrats	Tony Zeid	28	2.6%	New
Majority		203	17.5	
Turnout		1,096	36.45	−
Independent gain from Independent		Swing		

A by-election was held in Freshwater South on 1 May 2025, triggered by the resignation of independent (Empowering Islanders) councillor John Medland.

==== Lake North (May 2025) ====
Lake North by-election: 1 May 2025
Party	Candidate	Votes	%	±%
Reform	David Maclean	291	36.1	N/A
Conservative	Adrian Whittaker	232	28.7	−15.1
Green	Robert May	97	12.0	+1.9
Liberal Democrats	Julie Burridge	85	10.5	N/A
Independent	Sarah Morris	55	6.8	N/A
Labour	Emily Brothers	47	5.8	−9.0
Majority		59	7.4	N/A
Turnout		809	28.09	
Reform gain from Conservative				

The by-election was triggered by the resignation of Conservative councillor Tig Outlaw.

==== Wroxall, Lowtherville and Bonchurch ====
Wroxall, Lowtherville and Bonchurch by-election: 10 July 2025
Party	Candidate	Votes	%	±%
Ind. Network	Mark Jefferies	473	48.1	N/A
Reform	Bill Nigh	225	22.9	N/A
Conservative	David Groocock	153	15.6	−4.7
Liberal Democrats	Rachel Lambert	53	5.4	N/A
Vectis Party	Graham Perks	46	4.7	N/A
Labour	Christopher Lloyd	33	3.4	−8.9
Turnout		985	32.4	
Rejected ballots		2		
Registered electors		3,038		
Ind. Network gain from Independent				

The by-election was triggered by the resignation of independent councillor Rodney Downer.

==== Lake North (Oct 2025) ====
Lake North by-election: 2 October 2025
Party	Candidate	Votes	%	±%
Reform	Bill Nigh	290	36.8	+0.7
Conservative	Adrian Whittaker	249	31.6	+2.9
Liberal Democrats	Bob Blezzard	118	15.0	+4.5
Green	Robert May	88	11.2	−0.8
Labour	Christopher Lloyd	44	5.6	−0.2
Majority		41	5.2	−1.8
Turnout		789	28.4	
Registered electors		2,775		
Reform hold				

The by-election was triggered by the resignation of Reform UK councillor David Maclean.
