= Joe Robertson (politician) =

British politician (born 1984)

Joe Robertson MP
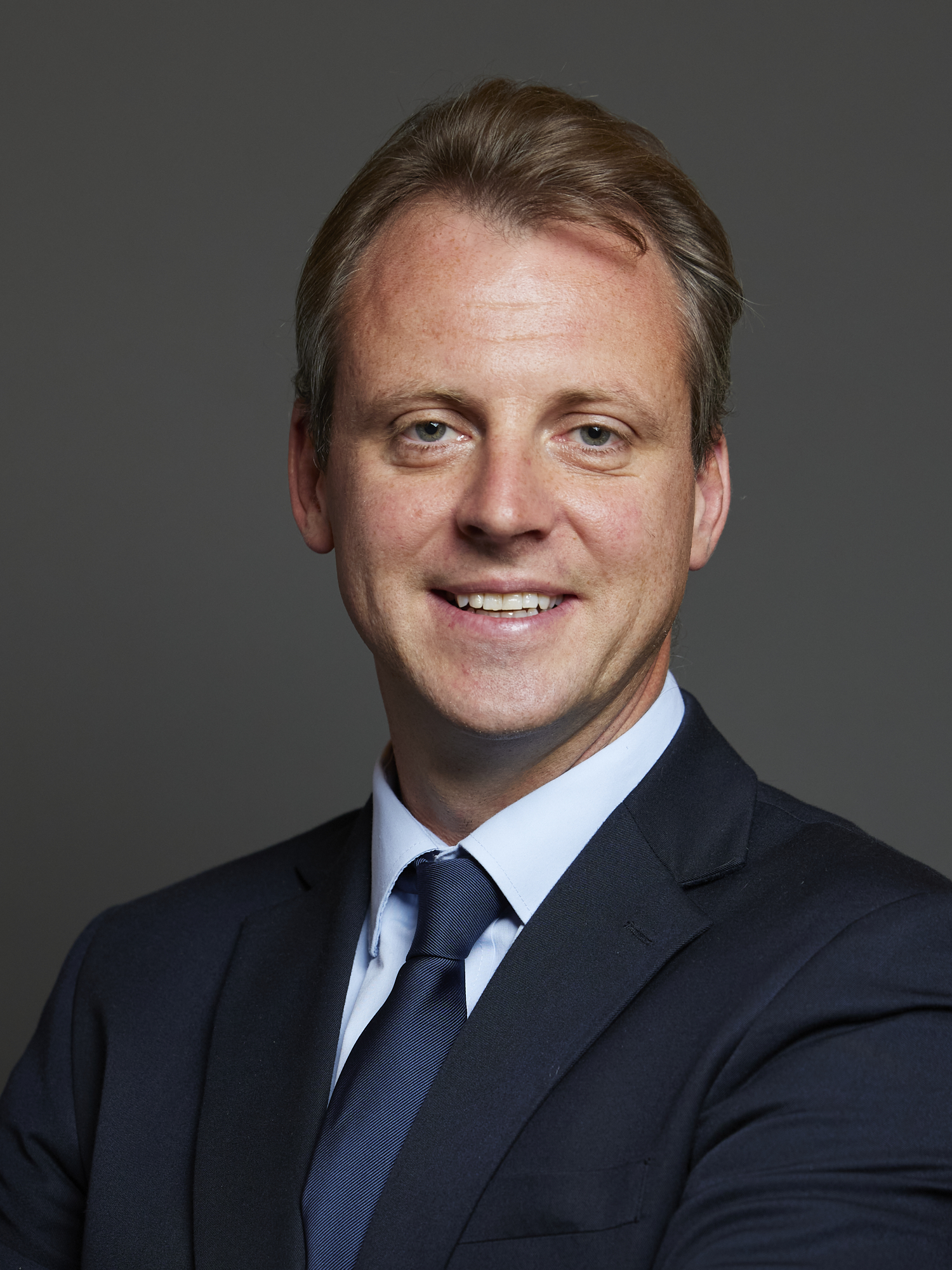
- Official portrait, 2024

Shadow Parliamentary Under-Secretary of State for Work and Pensions
- Incumbent
- Assumed office 31 August 2026
- Leader: Kemi Badenoch
- Preceded by: Mark Garnier

Member of Parliament for Isle of Wight East
- Incumbent
- Assumed office 4 July 2024
- Majority: 3,323 (9.8%)

Personal details
- Born: Joe Paul James Robertson; 1984 (age 41–42)
- Party: Conservative
- Education: Ryde School, Isle of Wight
- Alma mater: University College London (UCL); BPP University Law School
- Website: joerobertson.co.uk

Joe Paul James Robertson (born 1984) is a British Conservative Party politician who has served as the Member of Parliament for the Isle of Wight East constituency since 2024.

== Early life and education ==
Joe Robertson grew up on the Isle of Wight and was educated at Ryde School, a private boarding and day school in Ryde. He read geography at University College London between 2003 and 2006. He went on to study law at BPP University Law School, before being called to the Bar by Middle Temple in 2010.

== Early career ==
Joe Robertson practised as a solicitor in London and later Southampton. Prior to entering Parliament, he joined the charity Dementia UK as an in-house adviser, negotiating contracts with the NHS, local authorities and other health and care providers.

== Political career ==
Robertson stood in the 2019 general election in Erith and Thamesmead for the Conservative Party coming second and cutting Labour's majority from 10,014 to 3,758.

Robertson was elected to Isle of Wight Council in 2021. He served as the Conservative group leader between 2021 and 2023.

He was selected as the Conservative parliamentary candidate in June 2023 for the newly created Isle of Wight East constituency as part of the 2023 periodic review of Westminster constituencies.

In the 2024 general election Robertson was elected to Parliament as MP for Isle of Wight East with 30.6% of the vote and a majority of 3,323.

Robertson was elected to the House of Commons Health and Social Care Committee in 2024. He also serves as the parliamentary private secretary to the Shadow Culture, Media and Sport Team and Shadow Transport Team. He delivered his maiden speech on 8 October 2024 and was the first of the 2024 intake of Conservative MPs to deliver a speech from the Opposition dispatch box in the House of Commons on 24 January 2025. He has been the Shadow Parliamentary Under-Secretary of State for Work and Pensions, as well as a Junior Opposition Whip, since 2 September 2026.

== Personal life ==
Robertson lives in Bembridge and is married with two children.

== Electoral history ==
General election 2024: Isle of Wight East
Party	Candidate	Votes	%	±%
Conservative	Joe Robertson	10,427	30.6	−26.8
Reform	Sarah Morris	7,104	20.8	N/A
Green	Vix Lowthion	6,313	18.5	+4.5
Labour	Emily Brothers	6,264	18.4	−5.7
Liberal Democrats	Michael Lilley	3,550	10.4	N/A
Independent	David Groocock	420	1.2	N/A
Majority		3,323	9.8	
Turnout		34,078	61.0	
Conservative hold		Swing		

Parliament of the United Kingdom
New constituency	Member of Parliament for Isle of Wight East; 2024–present	Incumbent
