= County Hall, Newport, Isle of Wight =

County building in Newport, Isle of Wight, England

County Hall
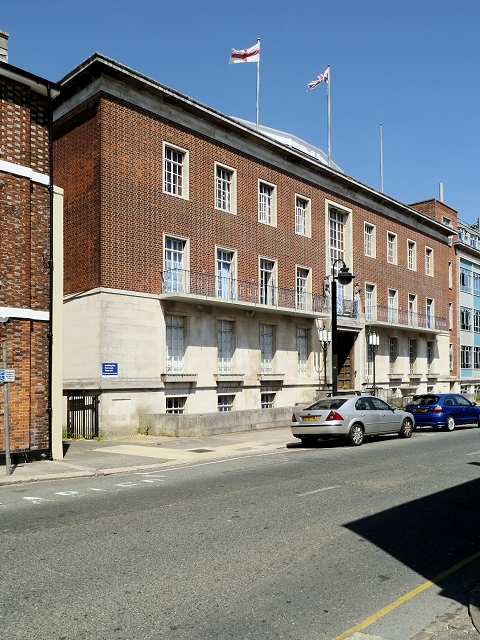
- The original building

- Location within Isle of Wight

General information
- Architectural style: Neo-Georgian style
- Location: High Street, Newport, Isle of Wight, England
- Coordinates: 50.7006°N 1.2914°W
- Completed: 1938

Design and construction
- Architects: Gutteridge and Gutteridge

County Hall is a municipal building in High Street, Newport, Isle of Wight, England. It is the headquarters of the Isle of Wight Council.

== History ==
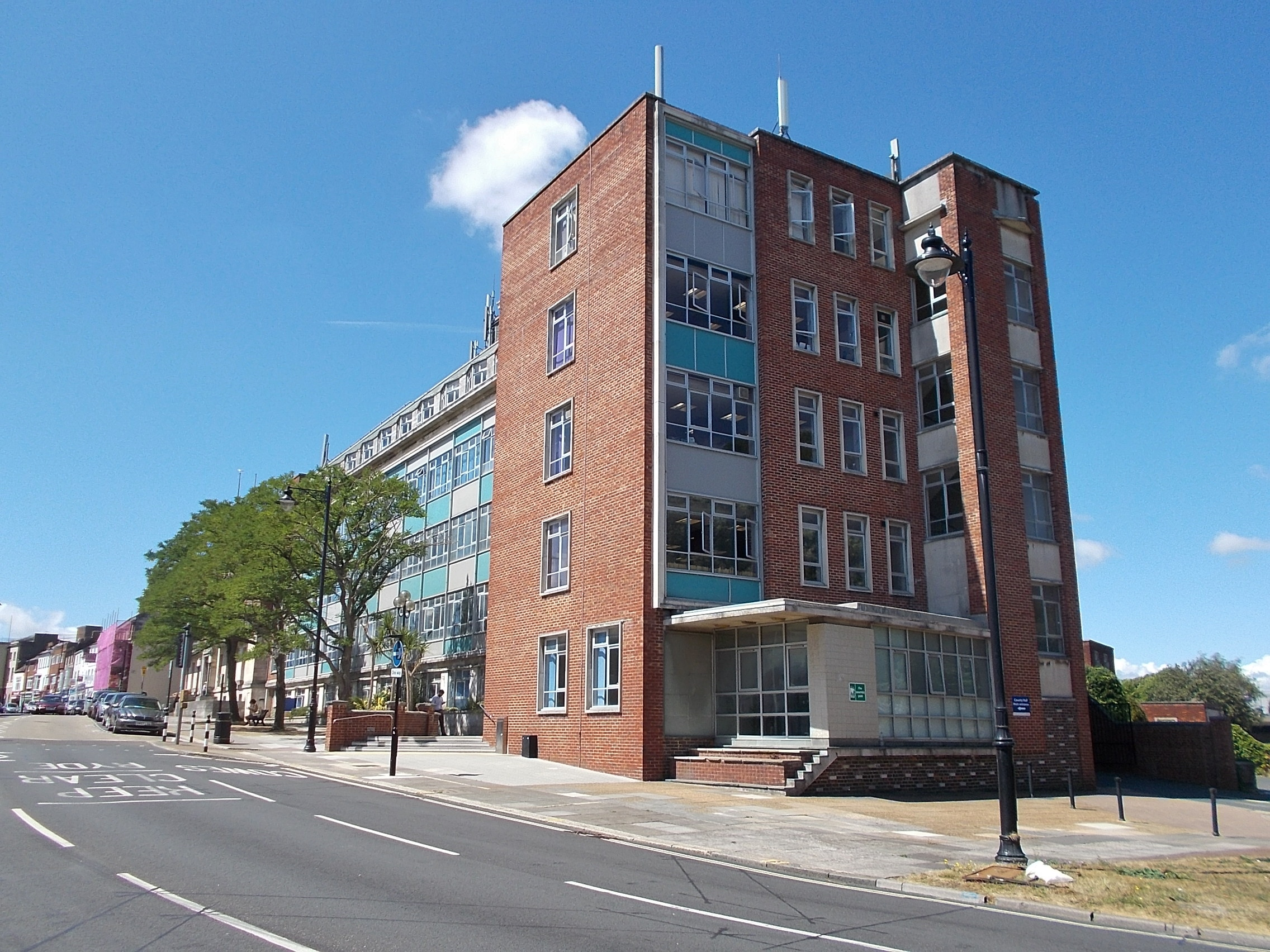
The modern extension built to the east of County Hall in 1969

Following the implementation in 1890 of the Local Government Board's Provisional Order Confirmation (No. 2) Act 1889 (52 & 53 Vict. c. clxxvii), which split a new County of the Isle of Wight out of Hampshire, it became necessary to find offices for the new Isle of Wight County Council. The "Swan Hotel" in the High Street, Newport was acquired for this purpose in 1898.

After deciding that this arrangement was inadequate for their needs in the context of the increasing responsibilities of county councils, county leaders chose to demolish the existing premises, acquire some adjoining properties and procure a purpose-built county headquarters on the same site. The new building, which was designed by Gutteridge and Gutteridge of Southampton in the Neo-Georgian style, was officially opened by the former Treasurer of the Household, Lord Bayford, on 19 October 1938.

The design involved a symmetrical main frontage of nine bays facing the High Street; the central section featured a doorway with a rectangular fanlight on the ground floor; there was a tall window spanning the first and second floors above. The left and right sections were faced with stone on the ground floor and featured balconies on the first floor. The county coat of arms, flanked by figures depicting Public service and Knowledge, which had been designed by John Hammond Harwood of the Sheffield College of Arts, were erected above the doorway. Pevsner described the design as "moderately civic-monumental".

An 18th century residential property known as "Hazards" was demolished to make way for a modern extension with a blue and white chequer pattern which was built to the east of the main building in 1969. Following a change of name of the former county council to Isle of Wight Council in 1995, County Hall became the home of the new unitary authority.

After Citizens Advice established a new advice centre in the building in November 2018, the Princess Royal visited the centre and received a demonstration of the centre's new video conferencing system in October 2020.
