= Richard Quigley =

British politician

Richard Quigley MP
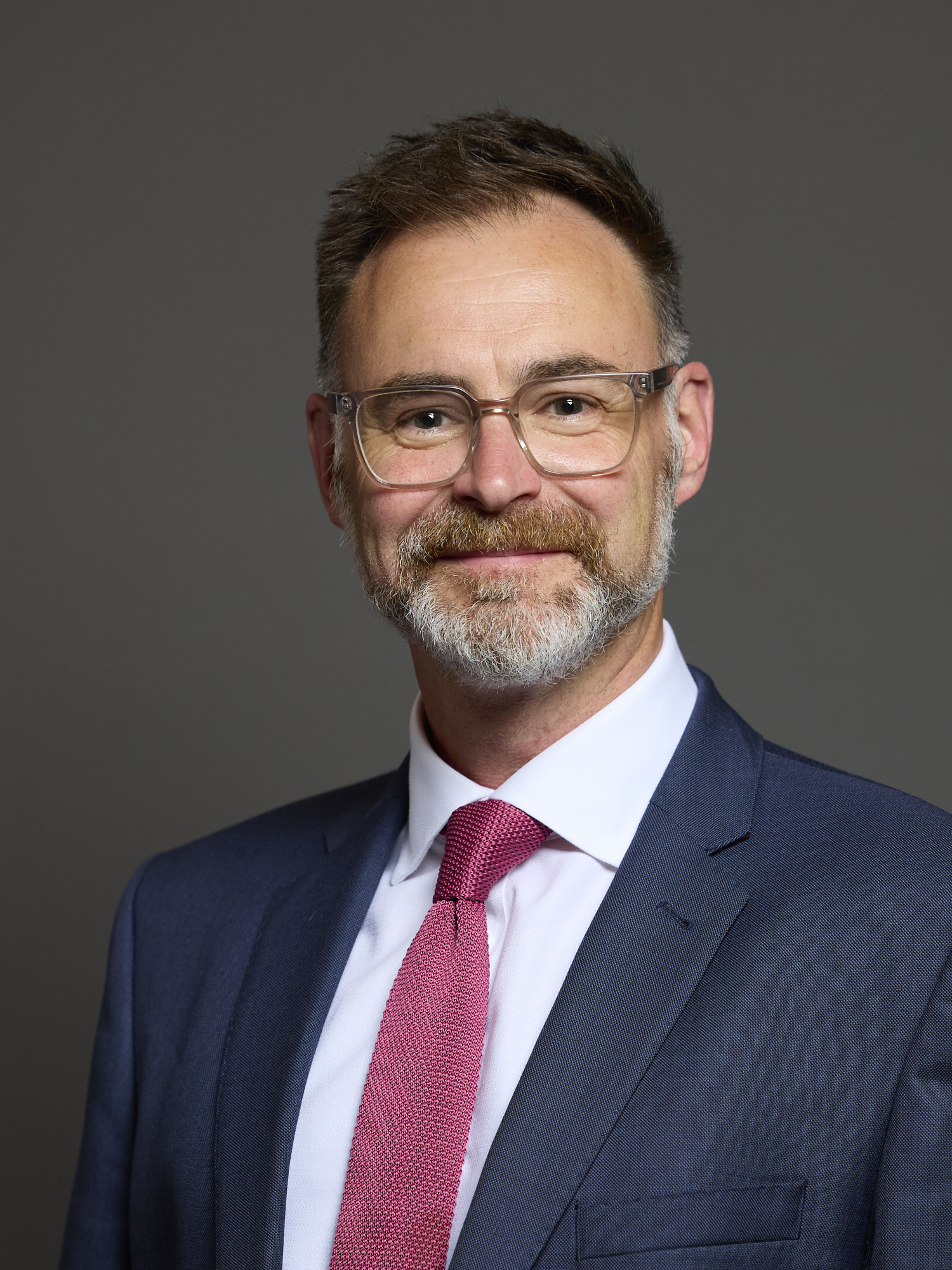
- Official portrait, 2024

Member of Parliament for Isle of Wight West
- Incumbent
- Assumed office 4 July 2024
- Preceded by: Constituency established Bob Seely (Isle of Wight)
- Majority: 3,177

Personal details
- Born: Richard Michael Quigley; August 1971 (age 54)
- Party: Labour
- Website: https://richardquigley.org.uk

Richard Michael Quigley (born August 1971) is a British Labour Party politician serving as the Member of Parliament for Isle of Wight West since 2024.

== Biography ==
Quigley was born in August 1971, and grew up in Retford, Nottinghamshire, England. He studied manufacturing systems engineering at Coventry University. He worked at Britvic Soft Drinks, before moving to the Isle of Wight to open a fish and chip shop.

Since 2021, Quigley has been a Labour and Co-operative Party councillor for Cowes North Ward on the Isle of Wight Council. He is the only Labour Party councillor on the council.

In the 2019 General Election, Quigley stood as the Labour candidate for the Isle of Wight constituency, coming second with 18,078 votes (24.3%). On 4 July 2024, he was elected Member of Parliament (MP) for Isle of Wight West with 13,240 votes and a majority of 3,177. This was the first time that the Isle of Wight had elected a Labour MP.

Quigley pledged to reform and regulate ferry operators serving the Isle of Wight, saying "Ownership needs to be taken away from the roulette wheel of private equity. A new referral to the competition and markets authority is needed."
