= Isle of Wight West =

UK Parliament constituency (since 2024)

Coordinates: 50.67°N 1.39°W

- County constituency for the House of Commons
- Interactive map of boundaries since 2024
- Boundary within South East England
- County: Isle of Wight
- Electorate: 55,406 (2024)
- Major settlements: Newport, Yarmouth

Current constituency
- Created: 2024
- Member of Parliament: Richard Quigley (Labour)
- Seats: One
- Created from: Isle of Wight

Isle of Wight West is a constituency of the House of Commons in the UK Parliament. Per the 2023 Periodic Review of Westminster constituencies, it was first contested at the 2024 general election, since when it has been represented by Richard Quigley for the Labour Party.

The Isle of Wight is granted two Members of Parliament under the 1986 Act, by an amendment by the Parliamentary Voting System and Constituencies Act 2011. The longstanding Isle of Wight constituency was split into Isle of Wight East and Isle of Wight West.

Quigley became the first Labour MP to represent the area and defeated Bob Seely, MP for the whole island from 2017 to 2024.

== Constituency profile ==
This constituency covers the western two-thirds of the Isle of Wight off the south coast of Hampshire.

It includes the towns of Newport (the island's administrative centre), Cowes, East Cowes and Yarmouth and villages including Freshwater and Totland.

Newport fields host the annual Isle of Wight Festival, one of the country's largest music festivals, and HMP Isle of Wight, one of the country's largest prisons. Cowes and East Cowes have a maritime history and are known for Cowes Week, an annual sailing regatta. A tract of land of East Cowes forms Osborne House and gardens, built for Queen Victoria as a summer home – this popularised the island in tourism. The constituency has average levels of wealth and income; there is some deprivation in Newport whilst Cowes is more affluent. House prices across the constituency are below the national average and considerably lower than the rest of South East England.

Residents of Isle of Wight West include more retirees and there are modest levels of higher education and household income. A high proportion of people work in healthcare and accommodation plus a high number of small businesses thrive in the arts and tourism, hospitality, the marine sector, and agriculture of all sizes. White people made up 97% of the population at the 2021 census. Within the local council, its towns and villages are mostly represented by independent councillors whilst the rural areas elected Conservatives and Greens. Voters gave strong support for leaving the European Union in the 2016 referendum; circa 61% voted for Brexit compared to the nationwide figure of 52%.

== Special representation for four islands or island groups ==
The island's constituencies have electorates that are around 75% of the UK average—more than the usually-permitted discrepancy of 5%—due to statutorily enhanced representation confirmed in 2023 for four of the six islands/archipelagoes at least as populous as the Western Isles (Na h-Eileanan an Iar) in Great Britain.

== Boundaries ==
Comprising all the western and most of a central belt of the Isle of Wight, it is specifically composed of these electoral divisions:

- Brighstone, Calbourne & Shalfleet, Carisbrooke & Gunville, Central Rural, Chale, Niton & Shorwell, Cowes Medina, Cowes North, Cowes South & Northwood, Cowes West & Gurnard, East Cowes, Fairlee & Whippingham, Freshwater North & Yarmouth, Freshwater South, Mountjoy & Shide, Newport Central, Newport West, Osborne, Pan & Barton, Parkhurst & Hunnyhill, and Totland & Colwell.

== Members of Parliament ==
Isle of Wight prior to 2024

| Election | Member | Party |
|---|---|---|
| 2024 | Richard Quigley | Labour Party |

== Elections ==
=== Elections in the 2020s ===
General election 2024: Isle of Wight West
| Party | Candidate | Votes | % | ±% |
|---|---|---|---|---|
| Labour | Richard Quigley | 13,240 | 38.6 | ▲14.1 |
| Conservative | Bob Seely | 10,063 | 29.3 | ▼25.7 |
| Reform | Ian Pickering | 5,834 | 17.0 | N/A |
| Liberal Democrats | Nick Stuart | 2,726 | 7.9 | N/A |
| Green | Cameron Palin | 2,310 | 6.7 | ▼9.7 |
| ADF | Rachel Thacker | 117 | 0.3 | N/A |
| Majority | | 3,177 | 9.3 | N/A |
| Registered electors | | 55,406 | | |
| Turnout | | 34,290 | 61.9 | ▼7.5 |
| Labour gain from Conservative | | Swing | ▲19.8 | |

2019 notional result
| Party | Vote | % |
|---|---|---|
| Conservative | 20,949 | 55.0 |
| Labour | 9,331 | 24.5 |
| Green | 6,245 | 16.4 |
| Independent Network | 757 | 2.0 |
| Others | 430 | 1.1 |
| Others | 391 | 1.0 |
| Turnout | 38,103 | 69.4 |
| Electorate | 54,911 | |

== See also ==
- List of parliamentary constituencies in the South East England (region)
