= Isle of Wight East =

UK Parliament constituency (since 2024)

Coordinates: 50.66°N 1.17°W

- County constituency for the House of Commons
- Interactive map of boundaries since 2024
- Boundary within South East England
- County: Isle of Wight
- Electorate: 55,855 (2024)
- Major settlements: Ryde, Shanklin

Current constituency
- Created: 2024
- Member of Parliament: Joe Robertson (Conservative)
- Seats: One
- Created from: Isle of Wight

Isle of Wight East is a constituency of the House of Commons in the UK Parliament. Further to the completion of the 2023 review of Westminster constituencies, it was first contested at the 2024 general election, since when it has been represented by Joe Robertson for the Conservative Party.

The Isle of Wight is granted two Members of Parliament under the Parliamentary Constituencies Act 1986, as amended by the Parliamentary Voting System and Constituencies Act 2011. The constituency has been created alongside Isle of Wight West from the divided former Isle of Wight constituency.

== Constituency profile ==
The Isle of Wight East constituency covers the eastern third of the Isle of Wight, an island off the south coast of Hampshire. The island's two constituencies each have electorates that are around 25% smaller than the United Kingdom average—more than the usually-permitted discrepancy of 5%—due to the island's protected status under the 2023 periodic review. This constituency covers the towns of Ryde, Sandown, Shanklin and Ventnor and the villages of Wootton Bridge, Bembridge and Lake. The island is popular with tourists and retirees. The constituency's towns are seaside resorts that became popular during the Victorian era. The constituency has above-average levels of deprivation, particularly in Ryde and Ventnor. Wootton Bridge and Bembridge are more affluent. House prices across the constituency are lower than the national average and considerably lower than the rest of South East England.

Residents of the constituency are much older than average and have low levels of education and household income. Few residents work in professional occupations and a high proportion work in accommodation, food and retail. White people made up 97% of the population at the 2021 census. At the local council, Shanklin, Lake and the more rural parts of the constituency are represented by Conservative councillors, whilst the settlements on the north coast (Ryde and Wootton Bridge) elected independents and localists. Voters in the constituency strongly supported leaving the European Union in the 2016 referendum; an estimated 63% voted in favour of Brexit compared to the nationwide figure of 52%.

== Boundaries ==
The constituency comprises eastern areas of the Isle of Wight, including the communities of Ryde, Bembridge, Brading, Sandown, Shanklin and Ventnor. It is composed of the following electoral divisions of the Isle of Wight:

- Bembridge, Binstead & Fishbourne, Brading & St Helens, Haylands & Swanmore, Lake North, Lake South, Nettlestone & Seaview, Newchurch, Havenstreet & Ashey, Ryde Appley & Elmfield, Ryde Monktonmead, Ryde North West, Ryde South East, Ryde West, Sandown North, Sandown South, Shanklin Central, Shanklin South, Ventnor & St Lawrence, Wootton Bridge, and Wroxall, Lowtherville & Bonchurch.

== Members of Parliament ==
Isle of Wight prior to 2024

Election	Member	Party
2024	Joe Robertson	Conservative

== Elections ==
=== Elections in the 2020s ===
General election 2024: Isle of Wight East
Party	Candidate	Votes	%	±%
Conservative	Joe Robertson	10,427	30.6	−26.8
Reform	Sarah Morris	7,104	20.8	N/A
Green	Vix Lowthion	6,313	18.5	+4.5
Labour	Emily Brothers	6,264	18.4	−5.7
Liberal Democrats	Michael Lilley	3,550	10.4	N/A
Independent	David Groocock	420	1.2	N/A
Majority		3,323	9.8	
Turnout		34,078	61.0	−3.0
Conservative hold		Swing		

2019 notional result
Party	Vote	%
Conservative	20,866	57.4
Labour	8,747	24.1
Green	5,093	14.0
Independent Network	785	2.2
Others	444	1.2
Others	404	1.1
Turnout	38,103	69.4
Electorate	54,911	

== See also ==
- List of parliamentary constituencies in the South East England (region)
