= Medina, Isle of Wight =

Former borough on the Isle of Wight, England

Coordinates: 50.6830°N 1.5401°W

Medina
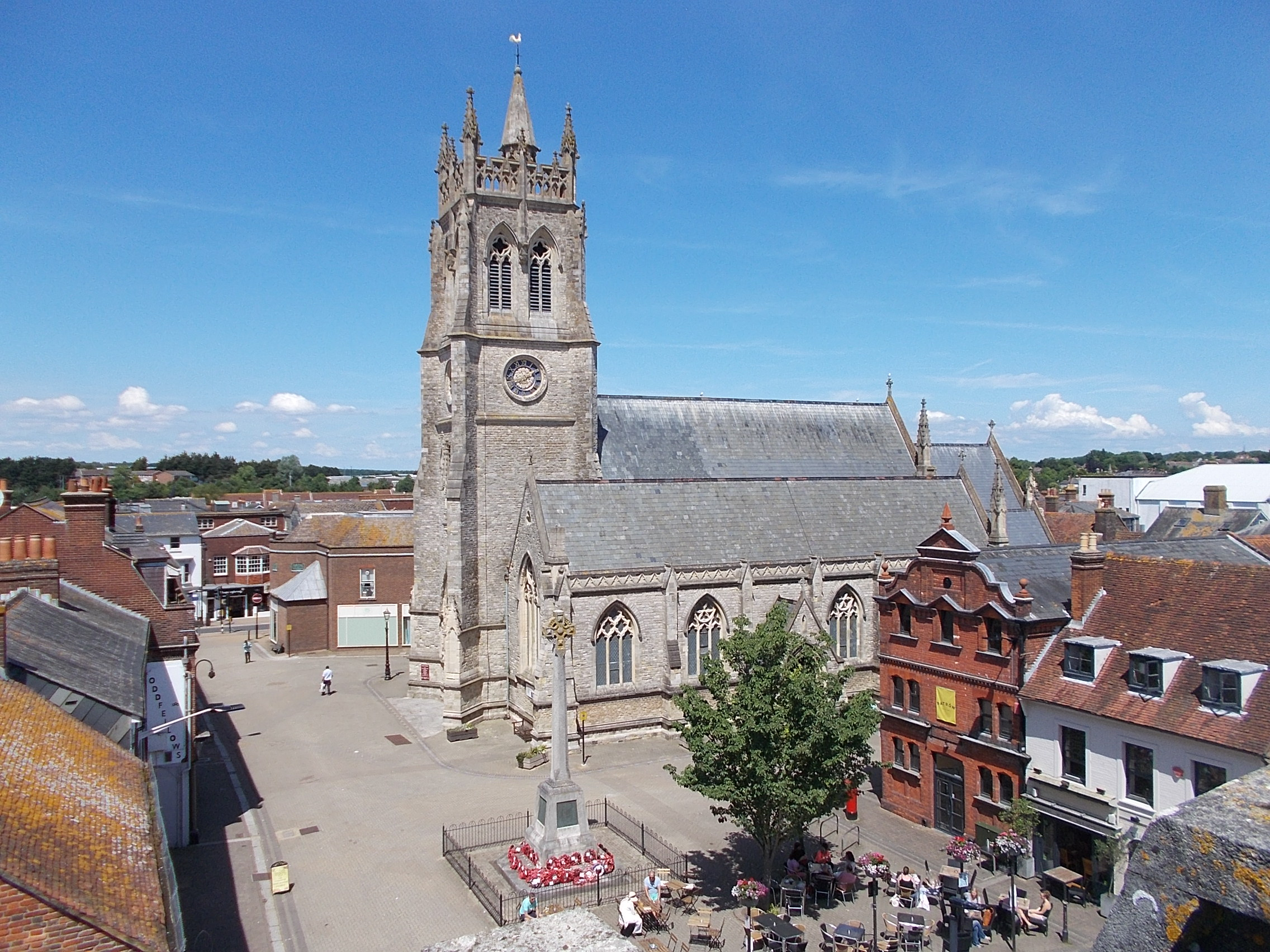

- Area
  - 1974: 28,949 acres (117.15 km^{2})
- Population
  - 1973: 64,790
  - 1992: 72,000
- History
  - Created: 1974
  - Abolished: 1995
  - Succeeded by: Isle of Wight Council
- Status: non-metropolitan district, borough
- Government
  - HQ: Newport
  - Motto: Floreat Medina (May Medina flourish)

Medina was a non-metropolitan district with the status of a borough on the Isle of Wight in England from 1974 to 1995.

The district was formed by the Local Government Act 1972, and was a merger of the municipal boroughs of Newport and Ryde along with the urban district of Cowes. It was one of two districts on the Island formed in 1974 - the other was South Wight. It was originally intended for there to be 1 single district for the Isle of Wight and for the Isle of Wight to be a district of Hampshire, it was later decided to have the Isle of Wight as a separate county and split it into 2 districts. At the time of creation in 1974 the whole of the district was unparished. In 1985 the parishes of Cowes and Gurnard were formed from part of Cowes unparished area, St Helens was formed from part of Ryde unparished area and Wootton was formed from part of Newport unparished area (and was renamed to "Wootton Bridge" in 1989) on 1 April 1989 Seaview was formed from part of Ryde and renamed to "Nettlestone and Seaview" on 15 May 1989. After the district was abolished the parish of East Cowes was formed from part of Cowes in 1998, the parishes of Fishbourne and Havenstreet and Ashey were formed from part of Ryde in 2006, in 2008 the parishes of Northwood and Whippingham were formed from the rest of Cowes, the parish of Newport was formed from the rest of Newport (and was renamed to "Newport and Carisbrooke" in 2018) and the parish of Ryde was formed from the rest of Ryde.

"Medina" was an older name for Newport which has been preserved in the River Medina.

Following a review by the Local Government Commission for England, the borough was abolished on 1 April 1995, when a single Isle of Wight Council replaced the Isle of Wight County Council and the island's two district councils.

== See also ==
- Medina Borough Council elections
