= Emily Brothers =

British Labour politician

Emily Andrea Melanie Brothers (born 1964) is a British Labour politician who stood in the Sutton and Cheam constituency in the 2015 general election and Isle of Wight East constituency in the 2024 general election. She is the first openly transgender Labour Party candidate to run for Parliament.

== Early life and education ==
Brothers was born on Merseyside. Diagnosed with aniridia, a condition affecting the iris, at six months old, she spent extended periods in hospital and lost her sight in childhood. At seven she became a weekly boarder at a Catholic school for blind and partially sighted children, and later studied at Teesside University, where she became involved in student politics.

== Professional career ==
Until February 2014, she was programme head at the Equality and Human Rights Commission, responsible for health and local government. Previously she worked at the Disability Rights Commission and the RNIB. She is an active member of the Greater London Association of Disabled People and former president of the National Federation of the Blind of the United Kingdom. She is on the board of the Community Network charity.

== Political career ==
She was one of a number of disabled delegates to the Labour conference in 2014 who complained about a lack of BSL interpreters, disabled delegates not being seated in the most accessible part of the conference hall, and problems with accessible information.

She gave an interview to Pink News in December 2014 in which she spoke about her transgender experience and her campaigning for disabled people and the value and the importance of the NHS. She also gave an interview to London TV station London Live in which she said she did not know if Ed Miliband knew about her transgender background, but that she was confident that he would be supportive. Ed Miliband welcomed her candidacy, saying she had long been a courageous campaigner on disability rights and now on trans issues too.

In response Rod Liddle of The Sun, in a December 2014 column, asked how she knew "she was the wrong sex", since she was blind, her response was: "My position is that I think it's a cheap comment that doesn't surprise me coming from The Sun. But my concern is how other transgender people feel about these comments, particularly those who are going through the transitioning process and are fearful of other people's reactions, and fearful of being ridiculed." In a statement later Liddle said: "I wish Emily the very best and I'd definitely vote for her if I lived in Sutton and Cheam. I am sorry for the poor joke!"

In the 2015 general election in Sutton and Cheam Brothers secured 5,546 votes, 4 percentage points more than her Labour predecessor in 2010. A few weeks later, the Independent Press Standards Organisation (IPSO), after upholding a complaint from the charity Trans Media Watch, obliged The Sun to publish its decision to censure Liddle for also being discriminatory towards Brothers in a second column, published in January 2015, supposedly apologising for the first. The IPSO considered Liddle to have breached its editors' code. In the 2024 general election in Isle of Wight East she came fourth behind the Conservatives, Reform UK, and the Green Party.

In March 2025, Brothers intended to apply for selection in the Runcorn and Helsby by-election but missed the deadline, criticising the "opaque process".

== Personal life ==
Brothers married in 1993, and had two children. The marriage broke down after she revealed her desire to live as a woman. She subsequently underwent hormone and voice therapy, and had sex reassignment surgery in Thailand in 2008.

She said that her ex-wife was very supportive and understanding, and that she had two children, William and Victoria, who were also supportive.

She is openly lesbian.
