= Isle of Wight Council =

Principal local authority of the Isle of Wight

- Coat of arms

Type
- Type: Unitary authority

History
- Founded: 1 April 1890 (Isle of Wight County Council); 1 April 1995 (Isle of Wight Council)

Leadership
- Chair: Ian Dore, Independent since 21 May 2025
- Leader: Jonathan Bacon, Independent since 27 May 2026
- Chief Executive: Wendy Perera since April 2022

Structure
- Seats: 39 councillors
- Graph of the party split among 39 seats.
- Political groups: All parties (39) Reform (19) Liberal Democrats (4) Conservative (2) Green (2) Labour (1) Independent (11)

Elections
- Voting system: First past the post
- Last election: 7 May 2026
- Next election: 2029

Meeting place
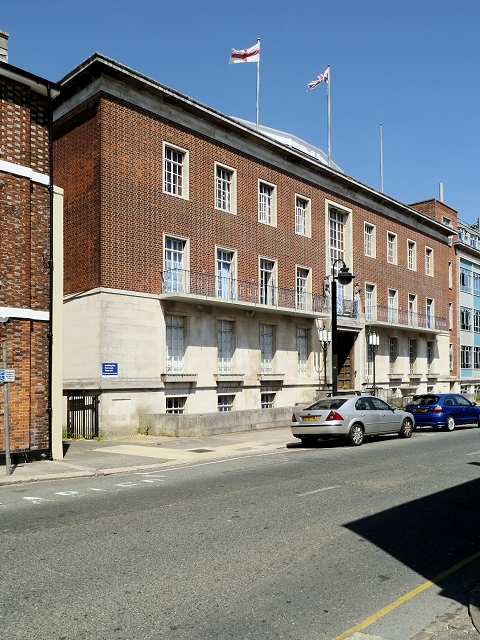
- County Hall, High Street, Newport, PO30 1UD

Website
- www.iow.gov.uk

Isle of Wight Council, known between 1890 and 1995 as Isle of Wight County Council, is the local authority for the Isle of Wight in England. Since 1995 it has been a unitary authority, being a county council which also performs the functions of a district council. It is based at County Hall in Newport. The council has been under no overall control since 2021. With the introduction of a committee system, replacing the former cabinet model from May 2025, the council is currently led by an independent politician, with committee chairs elected from Reform UK and the Island First Network.

In 2026, the council became a member of the Hampshire and the Solent Combined County Authority.

== History ==
Elected county councils were established in England and Wales in 1889 under the Local Government Act 1888, taking over administrative functions previously carried out by unelected magistrates at the quarter sessions. As part of the historic county of Hampshire, the Isle of Wight was initially governed by Hampshire County Council. Shortly afterwards it was decided that the island should form its own administrative county, whilst remaining part of Hampshire for judicial and lieutenancy purposes.

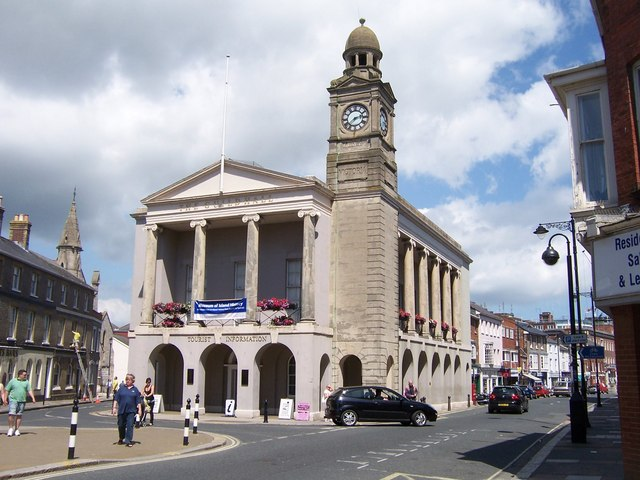
Guildhall, Newport: Council's first meeting place

Local Government Board's Provisional Order Confirmation (No. 2) Act 1889 (Note: Section 2.)
- Act of Parliament
- Parliament of the United Kingdom
- Long title: An Act to confirm a Provisional Order of the Local Government Board relating to the Isle of Wight.
- Citation: 52 & 53 Vict. c. clxxvii
- Territorial extent: United Kingdom

Dates
- Royal assent: 26 August 1889
- Commencement: 1 April 1890 (Note: Article 1.)
- Repealed: 15 August 1980

Other legislation
- Amended by: Justices of the Peace Act 1949
- Repealed by: Isle of Wight Act 1980

Status: Repealed

Text of statute as originally enacted

The administrative county of the Isle of Wight and the Isle of Wight County Council were therefore established, by the Local Government Board's Provisional Order Confirmation (No. 2) Act 1889 (52 & 53 Vict. c. clxxvii), with effect from 1 April 1890, on which day the council held its first official meeting at the Guildhall in Newport. Somerset Gough-Calthorpe was appointed the first chairman of the council.

Map of the districts from 1974 to 1995

Until 1974 the lower tier of local government comprised several boroughs, urban districts and a rural district. In 1974, under the Local Government Act 1972, the lower tier was reorganised and the island was left with two districts: Medina and South Wight. As part of the same reforms the island was reclassified as a non-metropolitan county and given its own Lord Lieutenant and High Sheriff, finally making it separate from Hampshire for ceremonial as well as administrative purposes.

A pre-1995 logo of the county council

On 1 April 1995, following recommendations made by the Local Government Commission for England appointed in 1992, the two district councils were abolished and the county council assumed their functions, making it a unitary authority. It was renamed 'Isle of Wight Council' at the same time. It remains legally a county council, but one which also performs district functions. It was the first such unitary authority in England; many more were created from 1996 onwards.

In 2026, the council became a member of the Hampshire and the Solent Combined County Authority.

== Governance ==
The council performs both district-level and county-level functions. The whole island is also covered by civil parishes, which form a second tier of local government.

=== Political control ===
The council has been under no overall control since the 2021 election. Reform UK became the largest party at the 2026 election, but fell one seat short of a majority. Since then, the council has been led by independent councillor Jonathan Bacon, with all committee chairs held by either Reform or independent councillors.

Political control of the council since the 1974 reforms has been as follows:

Upper-tier authority: Isle of Wight County Council

Party in control	Years
Independent	1974–1977
Conservative	1977–1981
Liberal	1981–1985
Alliance	1985–1988
Liberal Democrats	1988–1995

Unitary authority: Isle of Wight Council

Party in control	Years
Liberal Democrats	1995–1998
No overall control	1998–2005
Conservative	2005–2013
No overall control	2013–2017
Conservative	2017–2021
No overall control	2021–present

=== Leadership ===
The leaders of the council since 2007 have been:

Councillor	Party	From	To
Andy Sutton	Conservative		19 Sep 2007
David Pugh	Conservative	19 Sep 2007	May 2013
Ian Stephens	Independent	May 2013	21 Jan 2015
Jonathan Bacon	Independent	21 Jan 2015	16 Jan 2017
Dave Stewart	Conservative	18 Jan 2017	May 2021
Lora Peacey-Wilcox	Independent	26 May 2021	20 Sep 2023
Phil Jordan	Independent	20 Sep 2023	May 2026
Jonathan Bacon	Independent	27 May 2026	

=== Composition ===
Following the 2026 election, the composition of the council was as follows:

Party	Councillors
Reform	19
Liberal Democrats	4
Conservative	2
Green	2
Labour	1
Independent	11
Total	39

Of the independent councillors, six sit in the "Island First Network", three sit together as the "All for Islanders" group, and the other two are not aligned to a group.

== Premises ==
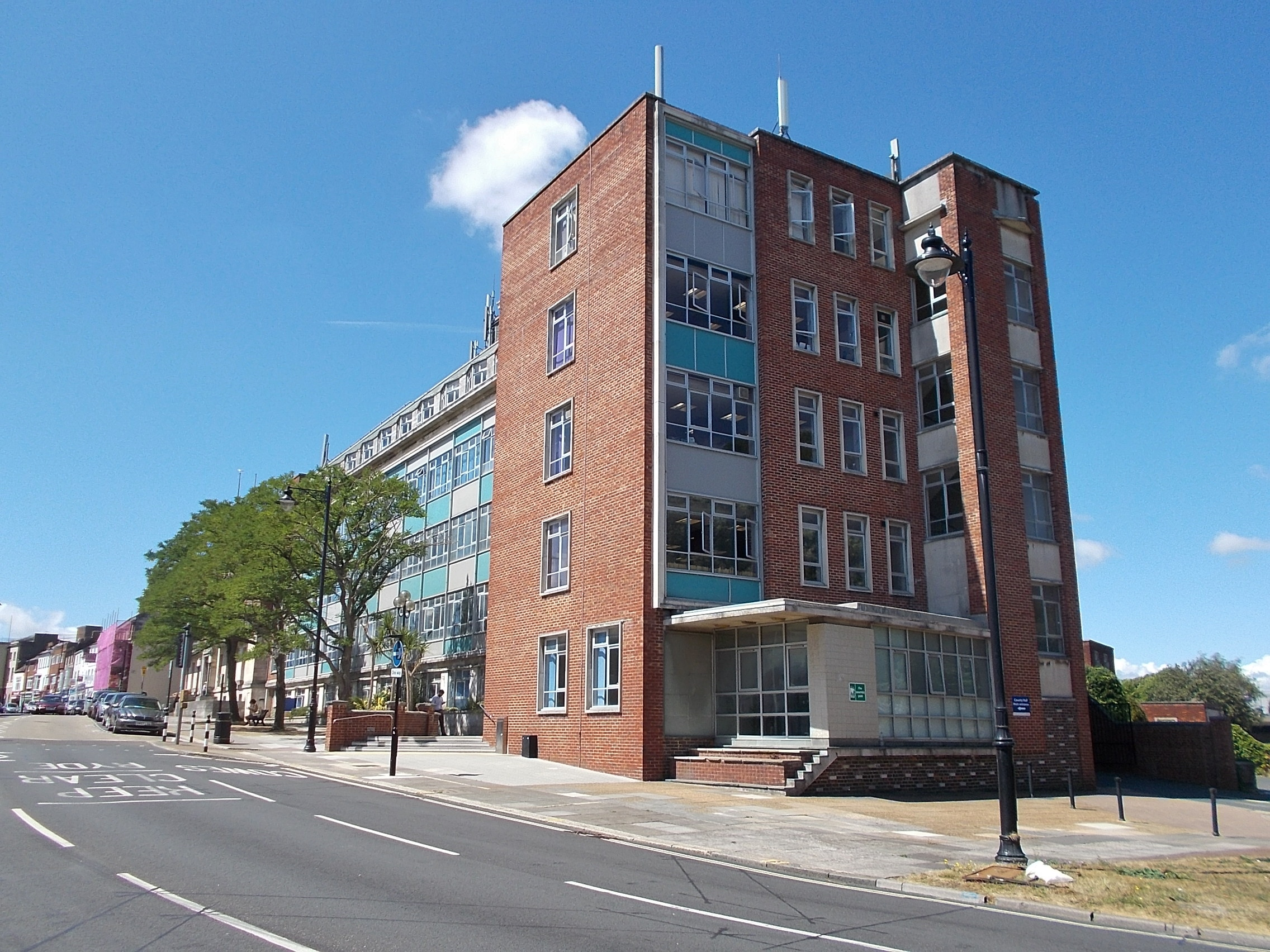
The 1969 wing of County Hall

The council meets and has its main offices at County Hall on High Street in Newport.

The council initially met at the Guildhall in Newport. In 1904 it moved its meeting place to the Technical Institute (now the Island Sixth Form) at the southern end of St James Street in Newport. Until the 1930s the council's administrative offices were split between several different buildings.

By the 1930s, many of the council's offices were at the former Swan Hotel and adjacent houses in High Street, Newport. A new building, designed in the Neo-Georgian style by Gutteridge and Gutteridge, was built on the same site and opened in October 1938. An extension was built on its east side in 1969.

== Elections ==
Since the last boundary changes in 2021 the island has been divided into 39 electoral divisions, each of which elects one councillor. Elections are held every four years.

== Coat of arms ==
The coat of arms of the Isle of Wight was granted to the County Council in 1938. The shield shows a representation of Carisbrooke Castle, which was the historic seat of many island governors, surrounded by three gold anchors. At the bottom is the island's motto "All this beauty is of God".

== See also ==
- List of electoral divisions in the Isle of Wight
- Isle of Wight Council elections
- Wightbus
