= Newport and Carisbrooke =

- Civil parish
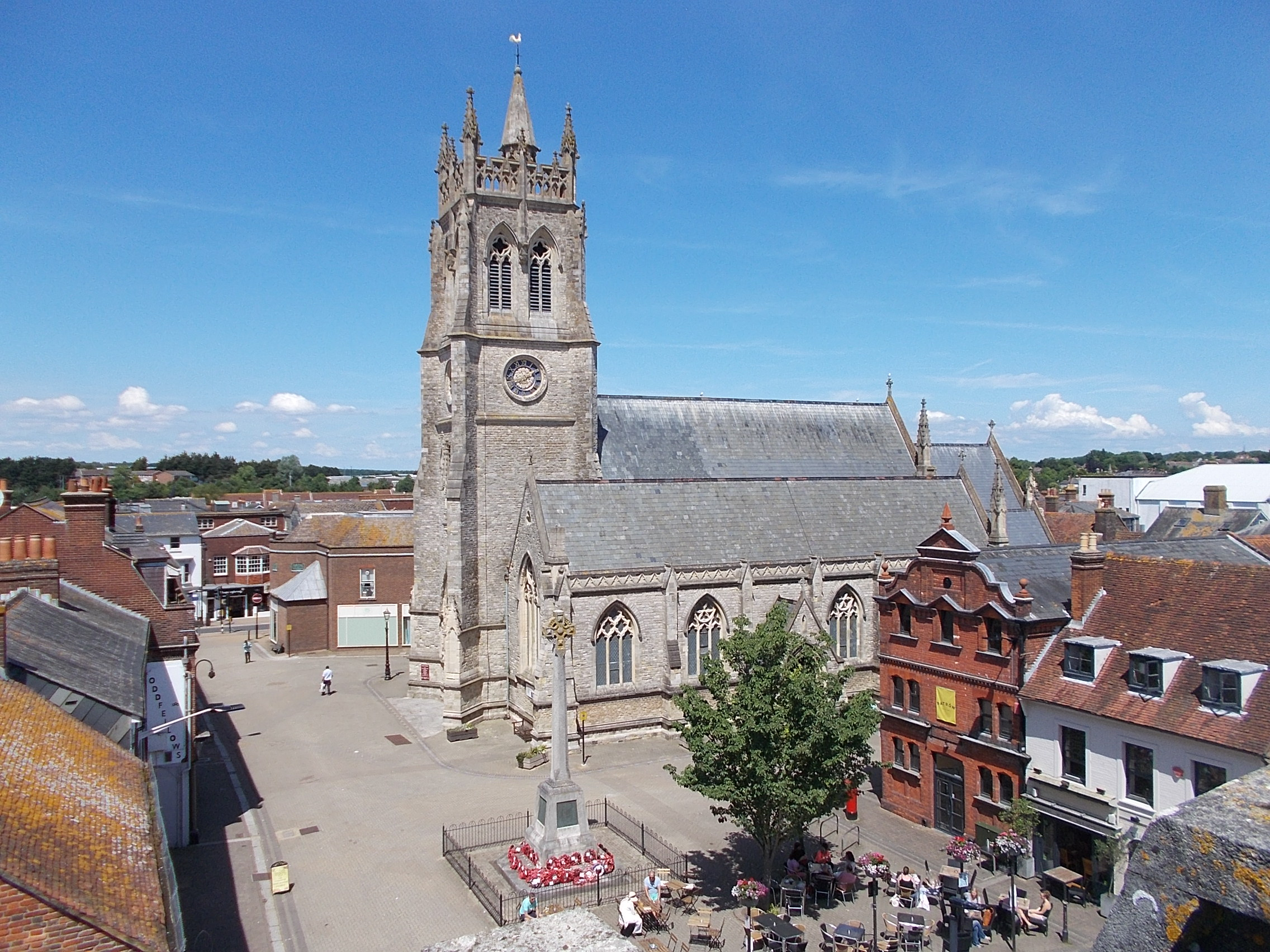
- Newport
- Interactive map of Newport and Carisbrooke
- Coordinates: 50.695207°N 1.3059568°W
- Country: England
- Primary council: Isle of Wight
- County: Isle of Wight
- Region: South East
- Status: Parish
- Main settlements: Newport, Carisbrooke, Apesdown, Barton, Bowcombe, Clatterford, Cross Lane, Fairlee, Forest Side, Gunville, Hunny Hill, Pan, Parkhurst, Rowridge, Shide and Staplers

Area
  - Total: 54.44 km^{2} (21.02 sq mi)

Population (2011)
  - Total: 25,496
  - Density: 468.3/km^{2} (1,213/sq mi)
- Website: https://www.newportwight.org.uk/

Newport and Carisbrooke, formerly just Newport, is a civil parish on the Isle of Wight, in the county of the Isle of Wight, England. The parish includes the settlements of Newport, Carisbrooke, Apesdown, Barton, Bowcombe, Clatterford, Cross Lane, Fairlee, Forest Side, Gunville, Hunny Hill, Pan, Parkhurst, Rowridge, Shide and Staplers. In 2011 the parish had a population of 25,496. The parish touches Arreton, Brighstone, Calbourne, Newtown and Porchfield, Chillerton and Gatcombe, Havenstreet and Ashey, Northwood, Shorwell, Whippingham and Wootton Bridge. There are 338 listed buildings in Newport and Carisbrooke. The community council is based at 64 High Street Newport, PO30 1BA

== History ==
On 1 April 1933 Carisbrooke was abolished and merged with Newport, parts of Binstead, Northwood and Whippingham were merged with Newport parish when these were abolished and 25 acres was also transferred from Gatcombe and 16 acres from South Arreton. The Municipal Borough of Newport was abolished on 1 April 1974 and Newport became an unparished area, on 1 April 1985 the parish of Wootton was formed from part of the unparished area, by August 2006 sufficient petition signatures has been acquired to parish the area, the parish was formed on 1 April 2008 as Newport from the unparished area, and Northwood and Whippingham parishes were also formed, the parish was then renamed to "Newport and Carisbrooke" on 29 September 2018 to improve inclusivity for residents of Carisbrooke since a petition received on 19 April 2006 to create a separate parish for Carisbrooke was not successful.
