= Clatterford, Isle of Wight =

Coordinates: 50°40′48″N 1°19′12″W

Clatterford
- Village
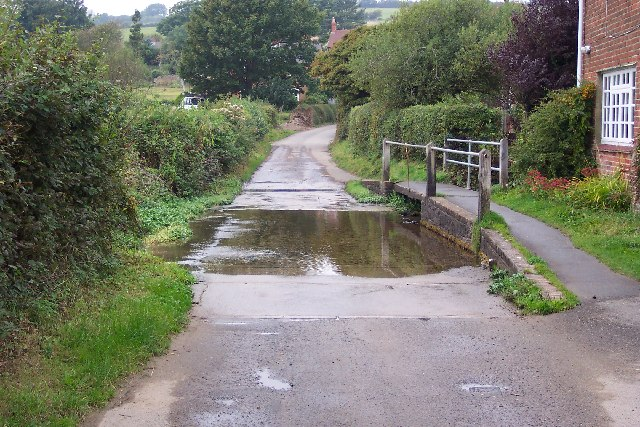
- The ford at Clatterford

- Location within the United Kingdom
- OS grid reference: SZ4810187794
- Civil parish: Newport and Carisbrooke
- Unitary authority: Isle of Wight
- Ceremonial county: Isle of Wight
- Country: England
- Sovereign state: United Kingdom
- Post town: NEWPORT
- Postcode district: PO30
- Dialling code: 01983
- UK Parliament: Isle of Wight West

Clatterford is a small village bordering Carisbrooke on the Isle of Wight. It is located in the civil parish of Newport and Carisbrooke, and the ward of Carisbrooke and Gunville. It was the site of the Island's only paper mill, which ran in the 18th century.

== Name ==
The name means 'the ford with loose stones or pebbles, loose-stone ford', from Old English clater and ford. The ford was across Lukely Brook, a tributary of the River Medina.

- ~1150: Claterford
- ~1200: Clatreford
- 1289: Claterford
- 1331: Clateruorde
- 1708: Clatterford

== History ==
Large foundations of Roman masonry have been found there, with traces of a Roman road.

There is a Roman villa in the village.

There are 9 listed buildings in Clatterford.

=== Paper mill ===
The Isle of Wight's only paper mill was established in Clatterford in 1710, probably by Isaac Tipps, a papermaker from Carisbrooke. It was in an area known as Rack Close, near to Froglands Farm. The earliest reference to the mill is in The Deliniator of the Isle of Wight, by James Clarke, 1829:

In the beginning of the last century, when the emigrations from the Palatinate to America were so in general, a paper-maker, who was one of the emigrants, came to the Island, and erected a small mill, near Clatterford, in the year 1710, for the manufacture of paper. The speculation, however, did not succeed, and in few years it was abandoned. Vestiges of the mill, pond, ? are still remaining, and the house is known to this day by the name of paper-mill.

On 22 April 1711, Isaac Tipps was recorded as Palantine, an 18th century term for a German immigrant, and married to Christian Rutter.

There are no traces of the mill. A survey found that there were structural remains in the stream, but were of a later date of the mill. There is also evidence of a fulling mill on the site of the mill in the early 17th century. In 1618 it was described as "decayed". The last record was in 1708.

The water source for washing the paper was required to be "pure" (no leaves, weed or particles of sand and silt). Three springs were used.

The quantity would have been around 1 to 2 tons per year.

In 1832, the Hampshire Telegraph reported a cottage burning down on the grounds of the mill:

On Sunday last, about three in the afternoon, a cottage, called Paper Mills, occupied by a poor widow and her family, at Clatterford, was observed to be on fire entirely destroyed.

== Geography ==
Lukely Brook, which rises in the Bowcombe Valley, flows through the Plaish/Carisbrooke Meadows, through the village. The brook historically powered many mills and was used for proffessions such as brewing and tanning. It crosses a few roads in Clatterford and Carisbrooke via fords. The Bullhead fish, locally called "Millers Thumb" can be found in the brook, as well as Sticklebacks, Eels, Trout, and other fish native to the Island.

== Notable people ==
- Captain Charles Wilfred Brannon, served from August 1914 to July 1919 in the IW Rifles in Gallipoli, Egypt, and Palestine, where he was awarded the Military Cross, whose address was listed as Clatterford at the 1911 census. Presumably employed by the Isle of Wight County Press. Son of George Alfred Brannon, the County Press managing director. Commemorated on the Isle of Wight County Press Jubilee Booklet, published 1935.
- Lieutenant Colonel William Henry Dennie (~1785-1842), 13th Regiment (Prince Albert's), served and died in India in the First Anglo-Afghan War. He is commemorated on a memorial in the nearby parish church of St Mary's Church in Carisbrooke. See also his biography.

== Gallery ==
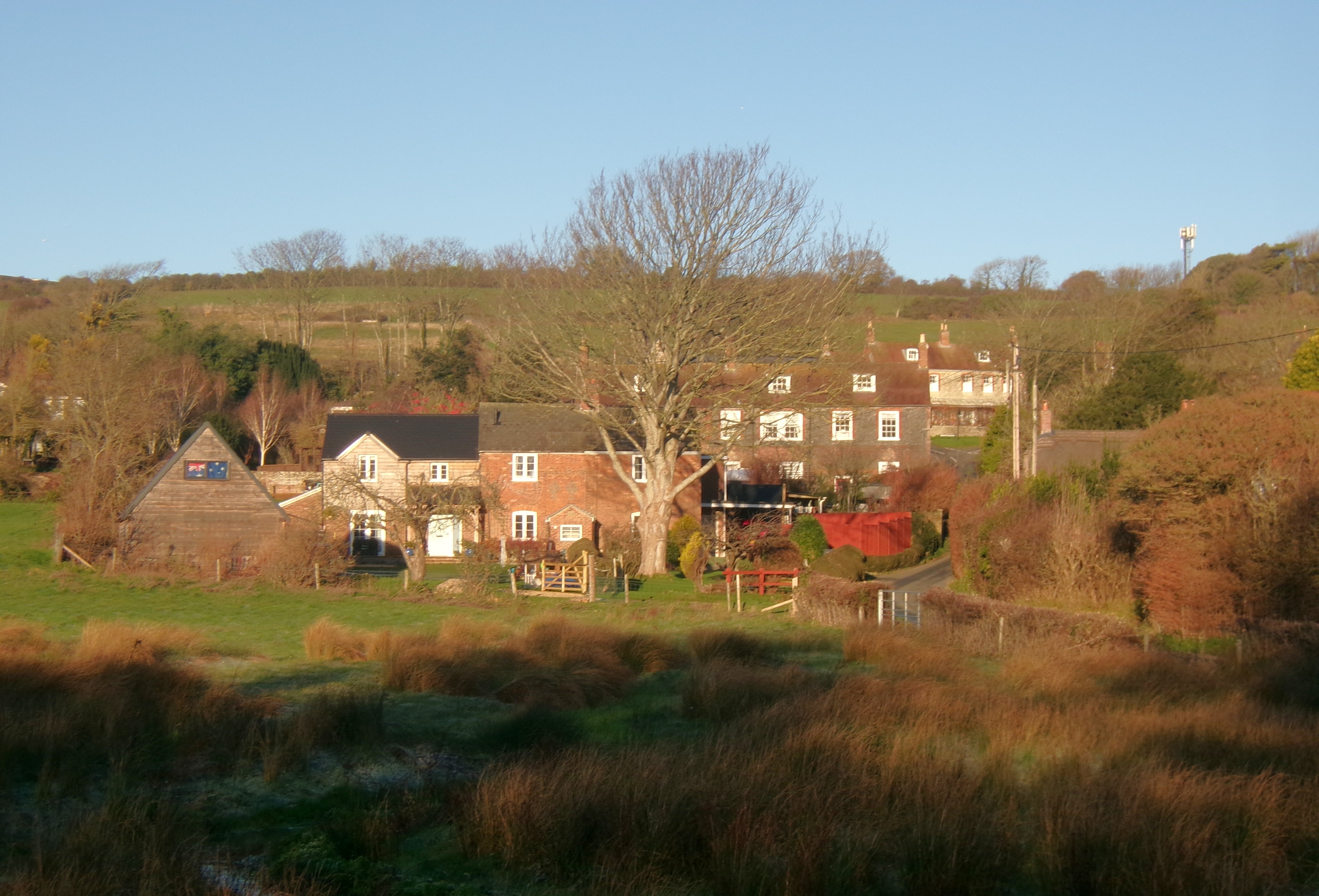
Houses at Clatterford

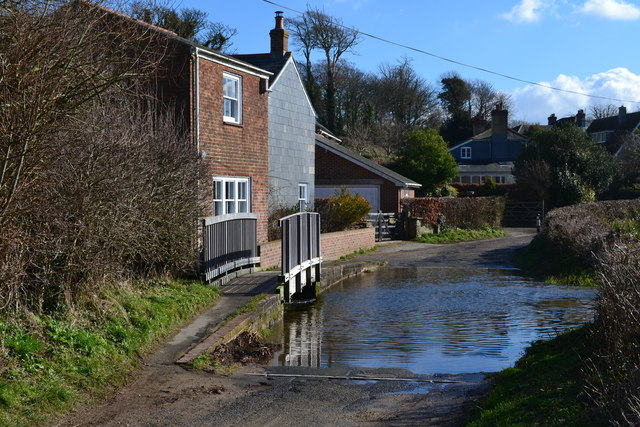
Clatterford Shute ford

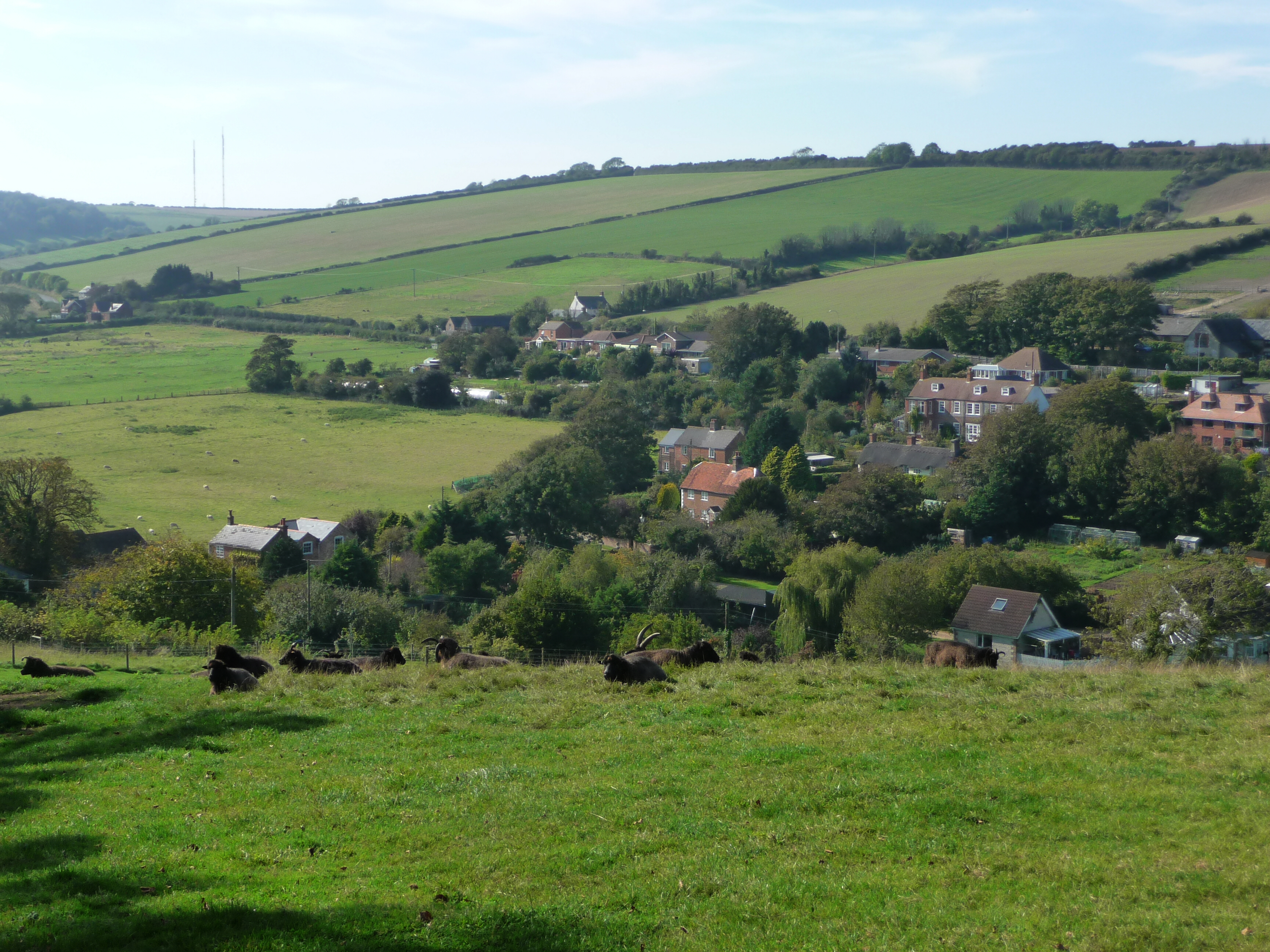
Clatterford from Carisbrooke Castle car park

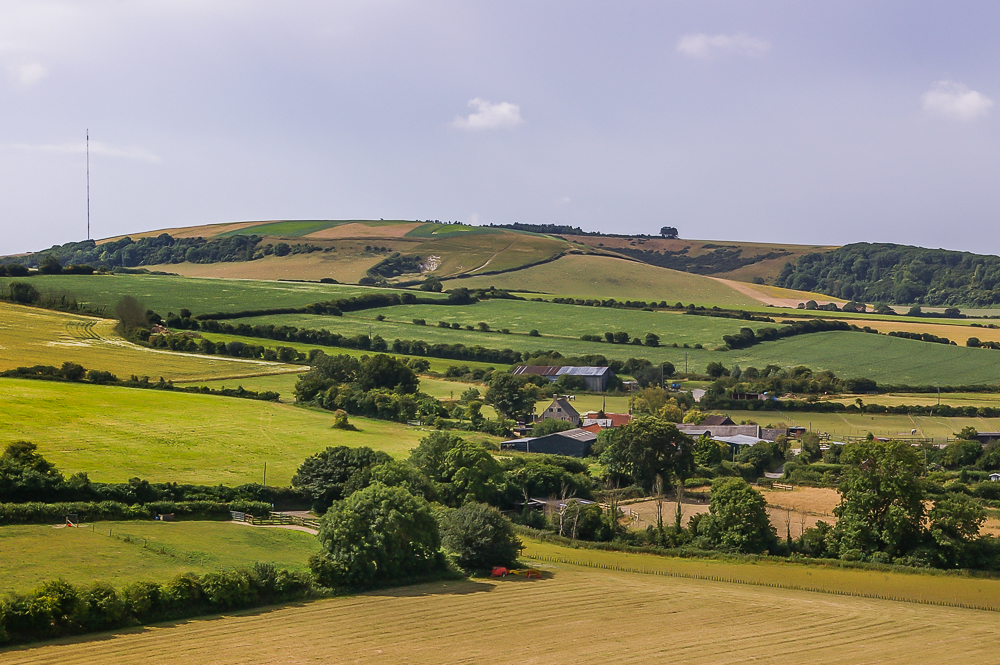
View from Froglands Farm, Clatterford

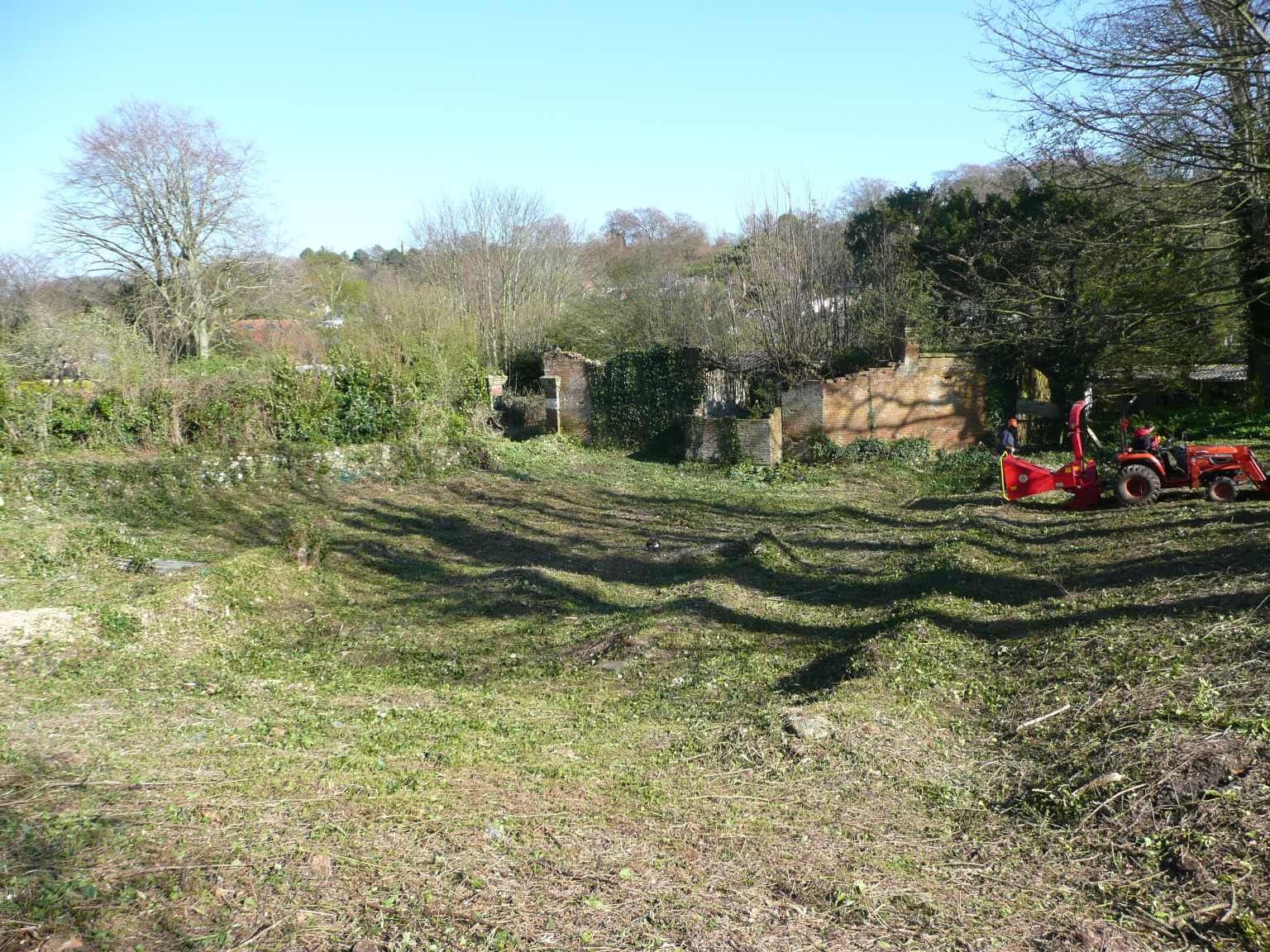
Site of the Roman Villa at Clatterford

Froglands Lane ford

Clatterford Coaching Inn

Former infant school at Clatterford
