= Ford (crossing) =

Shallow section of river or stream

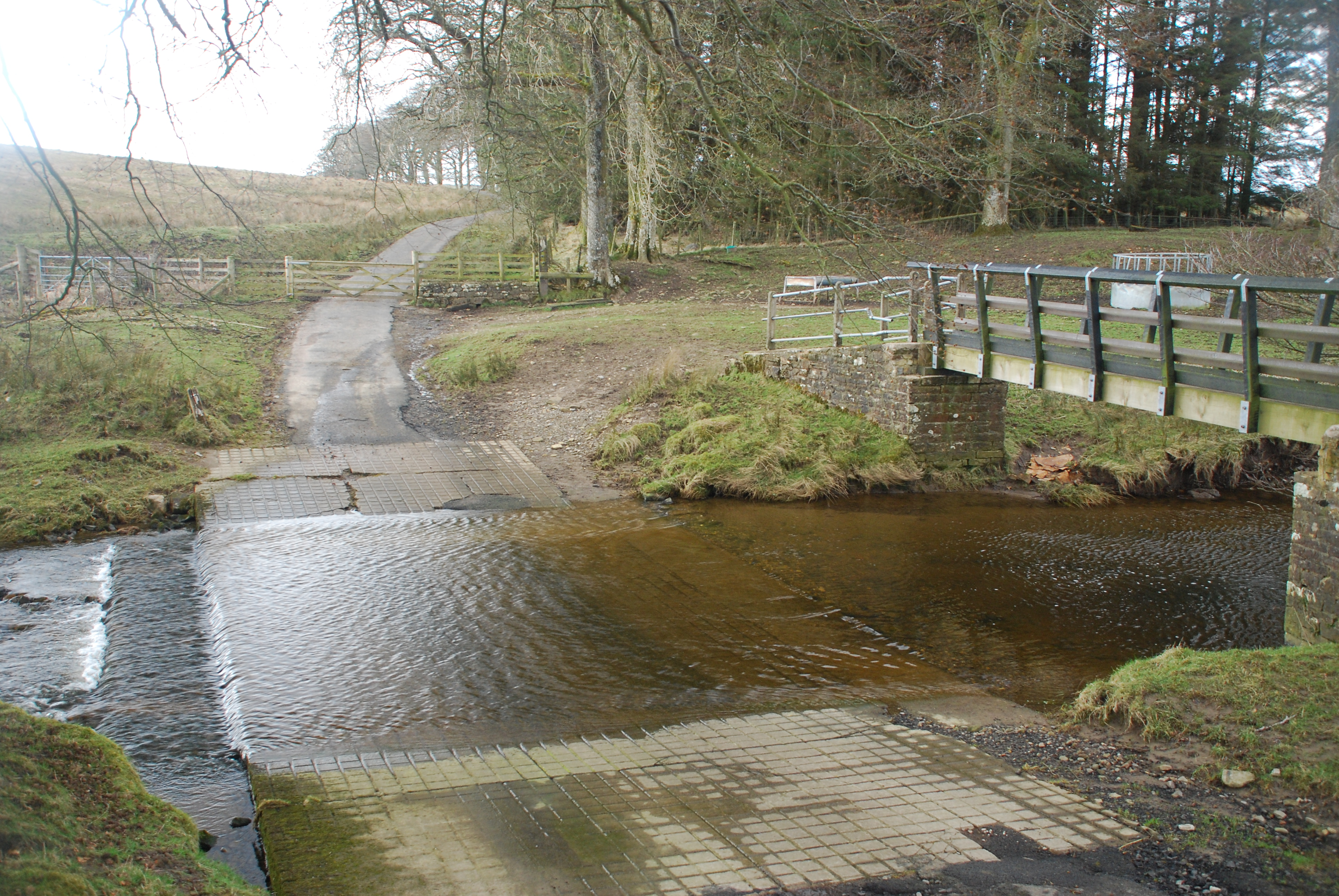
- Rawney Ford on the Bothrigg Burn, a tributary of the White Lyne in Cumbria, England
- Span range: Short
- Material: Usually none (natural, preexisting), but sometimes supplemented with concrete or asphalt for vehicles.
- Movable: No
- Design effort: None or low
- Falsework required: No

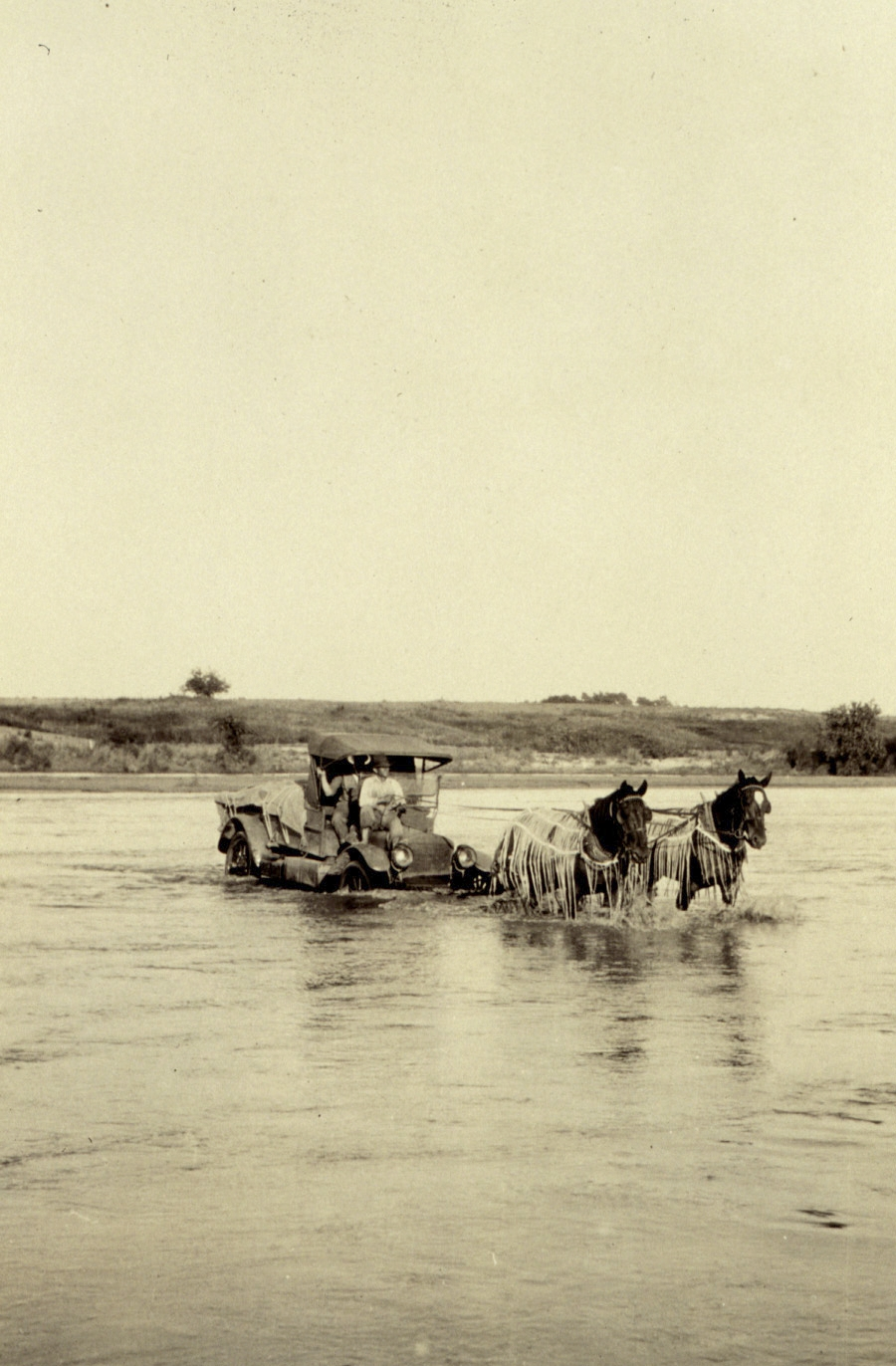
Crossing the Red River near Granite, Oklahoma in 1921

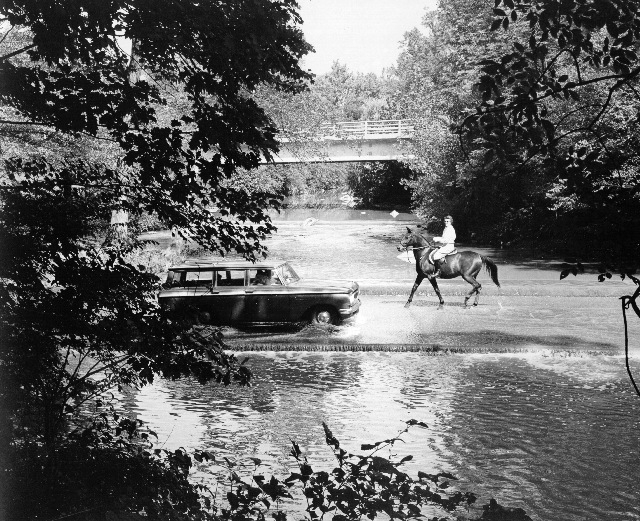
Crossing the Milkhouse ford through Rock Creek, Washington, DC, in 1960

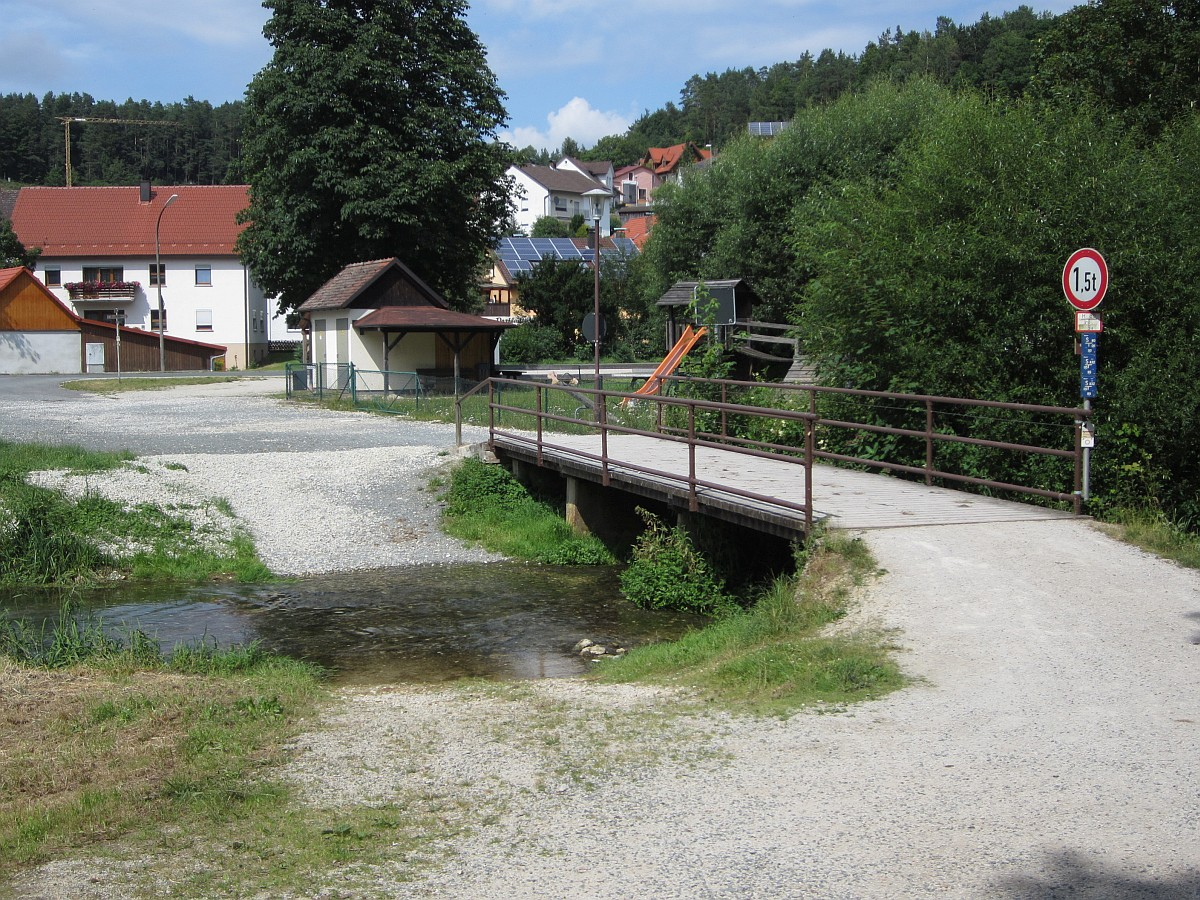
A ford next to a bridge that can only support 1.5 tonnes in Aufseß, Germany

A ford is a shallow section of a river or stream where it may be crossed by wading, on horseback, or inside a vehicle. A ford may occur naturally or be constructed. Fords may be impassable during high water. A low-water crossing is a low bridge that allows crossing over a river or stream when water is low but may be treated as a ford when the river is high and water covers the crossing.

The word ford is both a noun (describing the water crossing itself) and a verb (describing the act of crossing a ford).

== Description ==
A ford is a much cheaper form of river crossing than a bridge, and it can transport much more weight than a bridge, but it may become impassable after heavy rain or during flood conditions. A ford is therefore normally only suitable for very minor roads (and for paths intended for walkers and horse riders etc.). Most modern fords are usually shallow enough to be crossed by cars and other wheeled or tracked vehicles (a process known as "fording"). Fords may be accompanied by stepping stones for pedestrians.

The United Kingdom has more than 2,000 fords, and most of them do not have any way of stopping vehicles from crossing when the water makes them impassable. According to The AA, many flood-related vehicle breakdowns within the UK are at fords.

In New Zealand, fords are a normal part of roads, including, until 2010, along State Highway 1 on the South Island's east coast. In dry weather, drivers become aware of a ford by crunching across outwash detritus on the roadway. A Bailey bridge may be built off the mainline of the road to carry emergency traffic during high water.

At places where the water is shallow enough, but the material on the riverbed will not support heavy vehicles, fords are sometimes improved by building a submerged concrete floor. In such cases, a curb (kerb) is often placed on the downstream side to prevent vehicles from slipping off, as the growth of algae will often make the slab very slippery. Fords may be also equipped with a post indicating the water depth, so that users may know if the water is too deep to attempt to cross. Some have an adjacent footbridge so that pedestrians may cross dryshod.

Fords were sometimes the only way to cross bodies of water, such as at the Milkhouse at Rock Creek in Washington DC. However, the regular use of this ford has been superseded by bridges. The crossing remained open for "adventurous" drivers until 1996, when the National Park Service closed the ford to cars.

=== Watersplash ===
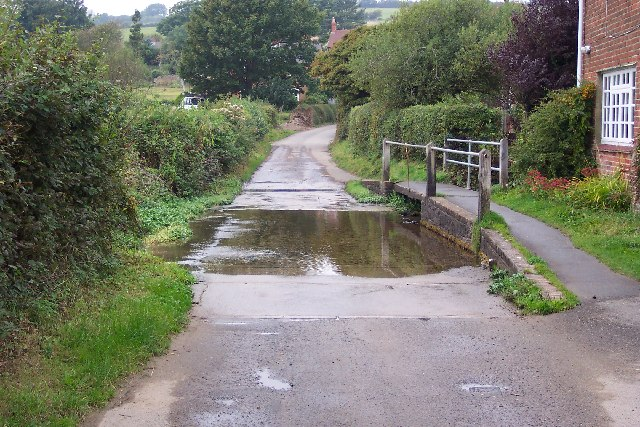
One of the two watersplashes in Clatterford, Isle of Wight. The one shown is over Lukely Brook, a tributary of the River Medina.

A road running below the water level of a stream or river is often known as a "watersplash". It is a common name for a ford or stretch of wet road in some areas, and is sometimes also used to describe tidal crossings. They have become a common feature in rallying courses. Some enthusiasts seek out and drive through these water features, recording details (such as wave created, position, and access) on dedicated websites.

There are many old fords known as watersplashes in the United Kingdom. Examples are at Brockenhurst in Hampshire, Wookey in Somerset, and Swinbrook in Oxfordshire. Some of these roads are being replaced by bridges, as they are a more reliable form of crossing in adverse weather conditions.

Some very spectacular watersplashes can be found in diverse locations. Australia has the Gulf Savannah, and others may be found in Canada, Italy, South Africa, and Finland. They are also found on some Tennessee backroads, where they are referred to as "underwater bridges".

In Israel and part of the British areas under the mandate a low water crossing or watersplash had been known as the "Irish bridge" in reference to the Anglo–Irish war.

== Placenames ==
The names of many towns and villages are derived from the word 'ford'. Because fords were often on major trade routes, towns near them could grow quickly. Examples include Oxford (a ford where oxen crossed the river: see the Coat of arms of Oxford); Hertford, the county town of Hertfordshire (the ford where harts cross or "deer crossing"); Brantford, (the ford where Joseph Brant Forded The Grand River); Ammanford (a ford on the River Amman); Stafford, the county town of Staffordshire ('ford by a staithe', or 'ford by the landing place'), Staffort crossing the river Pfinz; and Stratford (a ford on a Roman street). Similarly, the German word Furt (as in Frankfurt, the ford of the Franks; Ochsenfurt, synonymous to Oxford; Schweinfurt, a ford where swine crossed the river; and Klagenfurt, literally "ford of complaints") and the Dutch voorde (as in Vilvoorde, Coevorden, Zandvoort, or Amersfoort) are cognates with the same meaning, all deriving from Proto-Indo-European *pértus 'crossing'. This is the source of Brythonic and Gaulish ritus (modern Welsh rhyd; the Welsh name of Oxford is Rhydychen "ford of oxen"), which underlies such names as Chambord (from Gaulish *Camboritum "ford at the bend") and Niort (Novioritum "new ford").

Towns such as Maastricht, Dordrecht, and Utrecht also formed at fords. The endings tricht, drecht, and trecht are derived from the Latin word traiectum, meaning "crossing". Thus the name Utrecht, originally the Roman fort of Traiectum, is derived from "Uut Trecht", meaning "downstream crossing". The Afrikaans form was taken into South African English as drift and led to place names like Rorke's Drift and Velddrift. Similarly, in Slavic languages, the word brod comes from the linguistic root that means "river-crossing" or "place where a river can be crossed". Although today brod in the Serbo-Croatian means 'ship', Slavonski Brod in Croatia, as well as Makedonski Brod in North Macedonia and other place names containing Brod in Slavic countries, where brod is still the word for 'ford', are named after fords.

In areas with Old Norse influences in placenames, vað refers to a ford. Examples from northern England include Wath-in-Nidderdale and Yanwath. Elsewhere, "wade" – from waed, the Saxon word for ford – appears in names such as Biggleswade and Wadebridge. The word appears as "worth" in Rainworth.

== Famous battles ==
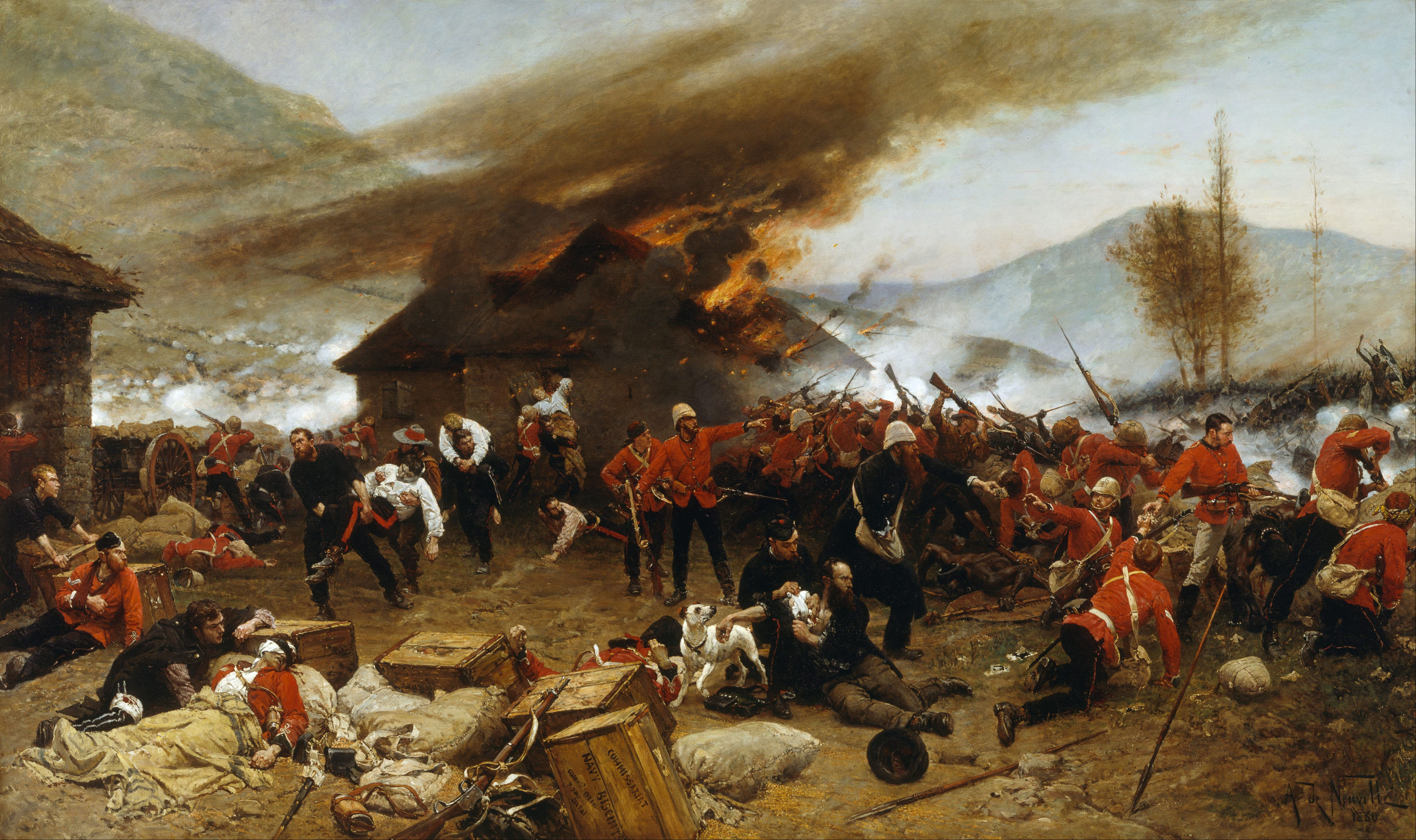
The Battle of Rorke's Drift in the Anglo-Zulu war

In historic times, positioning an army in large units close to a river was thought best for direct defense as well as to attack the enemy at any crossing point. Therefore, a ford was often a strategic military point with many famous battles fought at or near fords:

- Battle of Xiaoyao Ford, 215–217, during the wars at the end of the Han dynasty in China
- Battle of Fulford, 1066, on the Ouse River during Harald Hardrada's invasion of England
- Battle of Jacob's Ford, 1179, on the Jordan River during the period between the Second and Third Crusade
- Battle of Imjin River, 1592, on the Imjin River during the Japanese invasion of Korea
- Battle of the Yellow Ford, 1598, on the Blackwater River during the Nine Years' War in Ireland
- Battle of Newburn Ford, 1640, on the Tyne River during the Second Bishops' War in Scotland
- Battle of the Boyne, 1690, on the Boyne River during the Williamite-Jacobite War in Ireland
- Battle of Matson's Ford, 1777, on the Schuylkill River during the Philadelphia campaign of the American Revolutionary War in Pennsylvania
- Battle of Brandywine, 1777, on Brandywine Creek during the Philadelphia campaign of the American Revolutionary War in Pennsylvania
- Battle of Minisink, 1779, on the Delaware River during the Northern theater of the American Revolutionary War in New York
- Battle of Cowan's Ford, 1781, on the Catawba River during the Southern theater of the American Revolutionary War in North Carolina
- Battle of Assaye, 1803, on the Kalina River during the Second Anglo-Maratha War in India
- Battle of Blackburn's Ford, 1861, on Bull Run Creek during the Manassas campaign of the American Civil War in Virginia
- Battle of Kelly's Ford, 1863, on the Rappahannock River during the Eastern Theater of the American Civil War in Virginia
- Battle of Buffington Island, 1863, on the Ohio River during Morgan's Raid in the American Civil War in Ohio and West Virginia
- Battle of Chancellorsville, 1863, on the Rappahannock River during the Eastern Theater of the American Civil War in Virginia
- Battle of Byram's Ford, 1864, on the Blue River during Price's Missouri Expedition in the American Civil War in Missouri
- Battle of Morton's Ford, 1864, on the Rapidan River during the American Civil War in Virginia
- Battle of Rorke's Drift, 1879, on the Buffalo River during the Anglo-Zulu War in South Africa
- Battle of Cut Knife, 1885, on the North Saskatchewan River during the North-West Rebellion in Canada
- Battle of Davydiv Brid, 2022, on the Inhulets river during the 2022 Russian invasion of Ukraine

=== In fiction ===
- Achilles Fights the River, Trojan War, as found in The Illiad, by Homer, Book 21, line 1
- The Defence of Duffer's Drift, 1900
- First and Second Battles of the Fords of Isen, (The Lord of the Rings: The Two Towers)
- Battle of the Trident, (A Song of Ice and Fire, Game of Thrones)

== Gallery ==
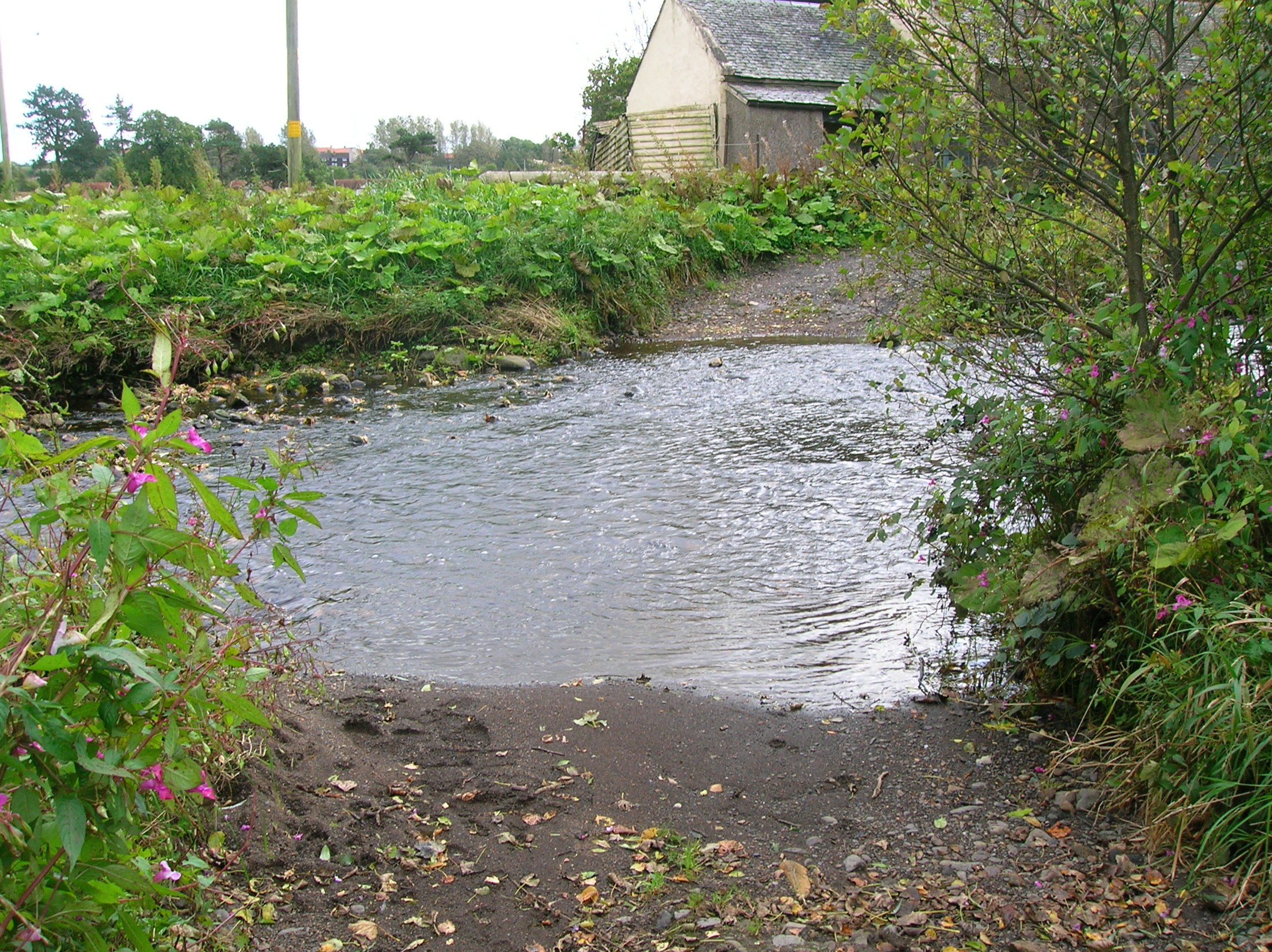
The Rye Water Ford in North Ayrshire, an unmodernised crossing of a minor river

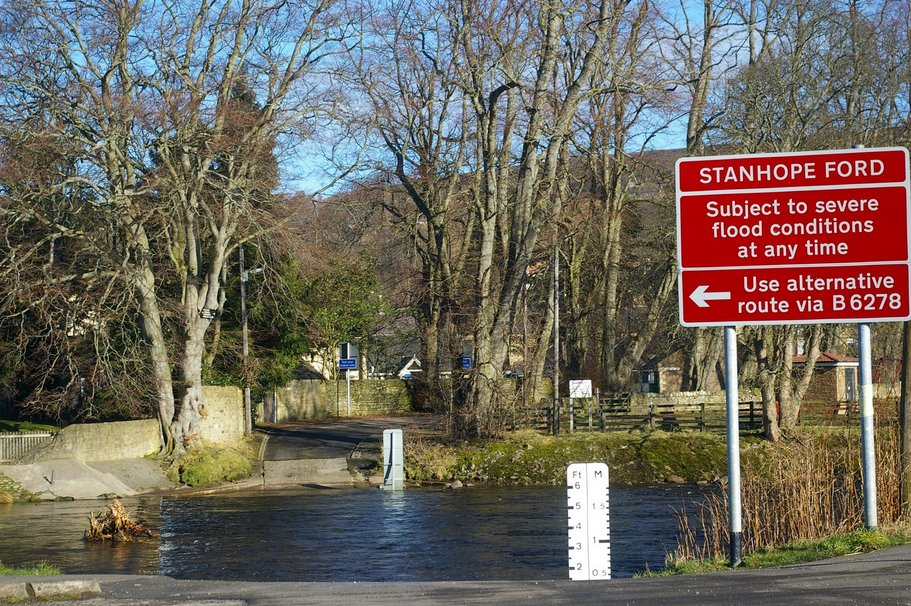
A ford in Stanhope, England, that has been closed

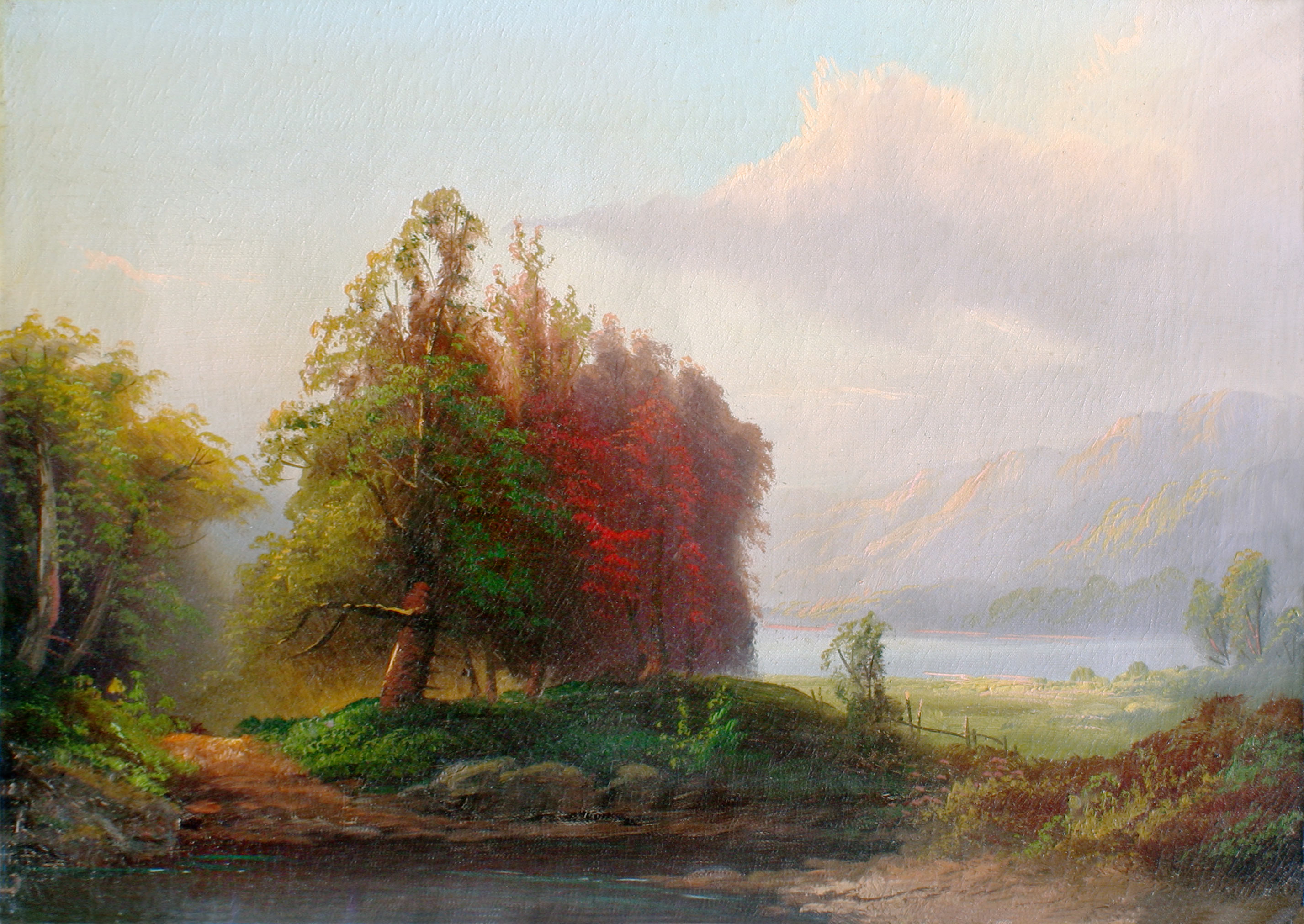
A ford in a 19th-century oil painting. In this instance, the ford may have artistic or symbolic significance.

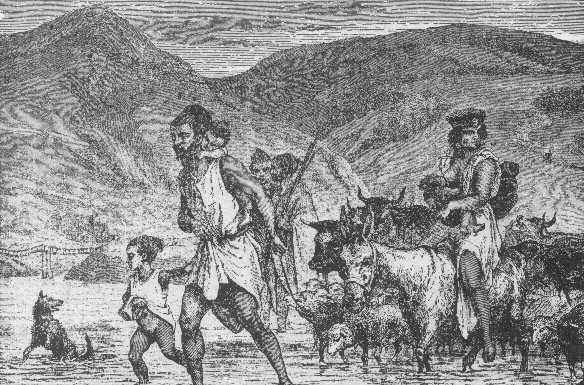
An Amazigh family crossing a ford in Algeria

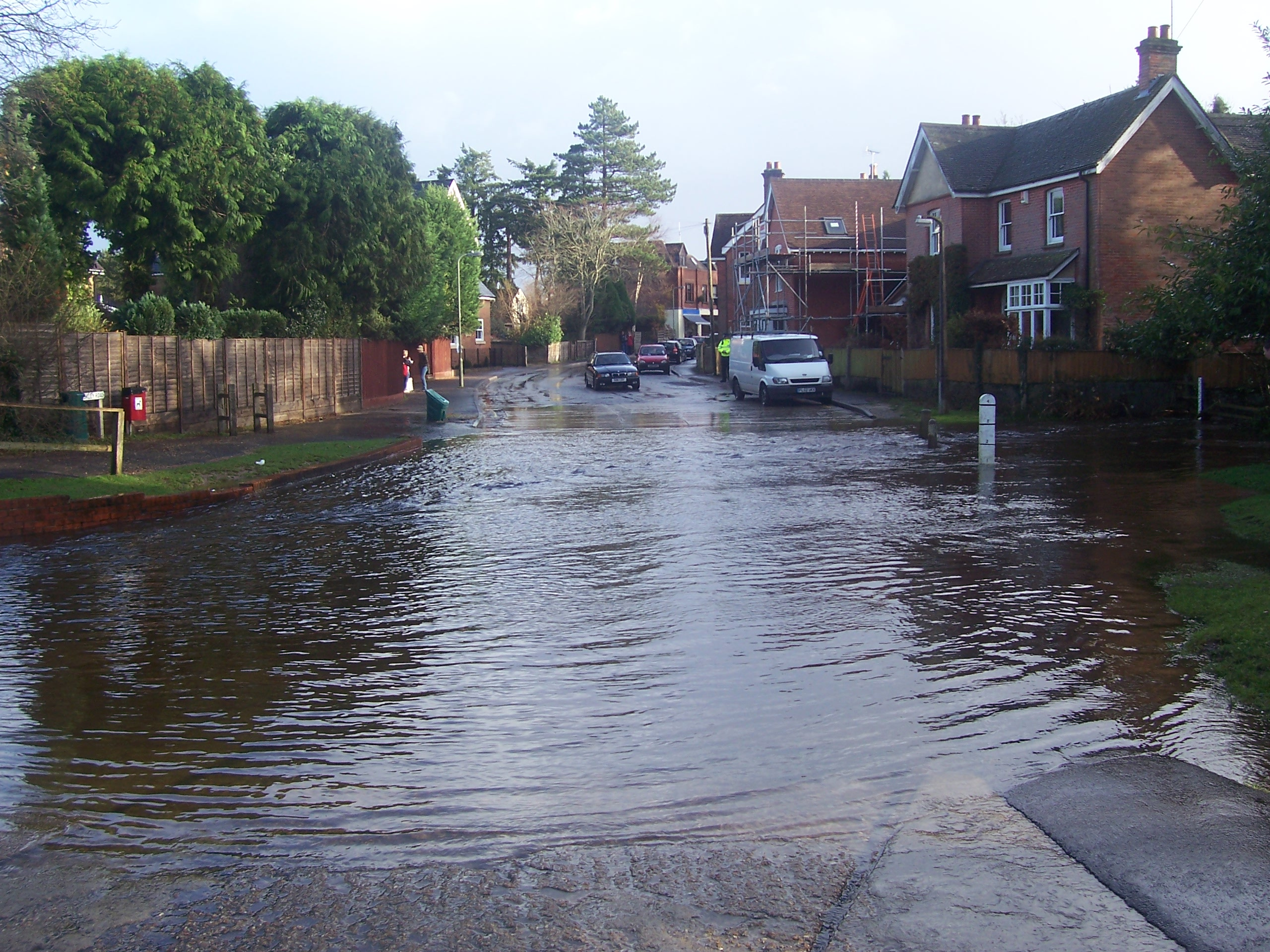
The ford in Brockenhurst, Hampshire, following heavy rain

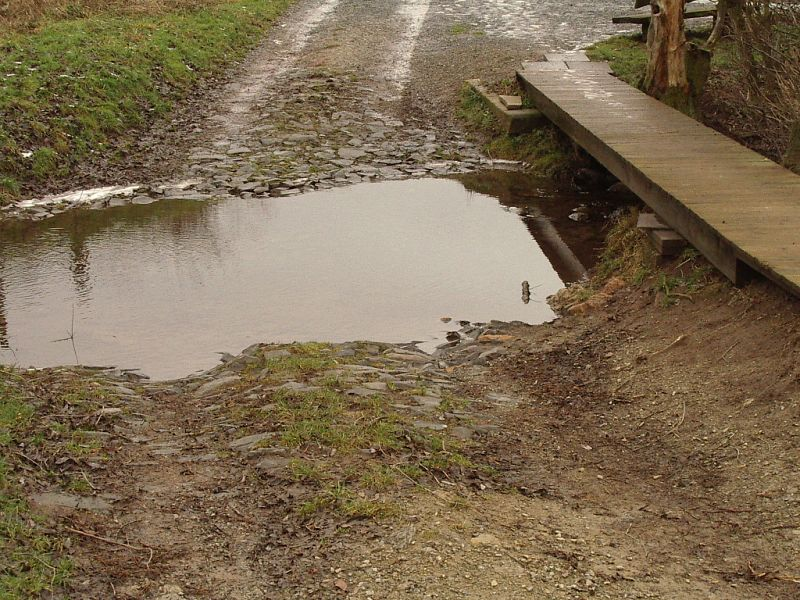
A ford, with pedestrian footbridge, on a minor road near Weimar bei Kassel in Germany

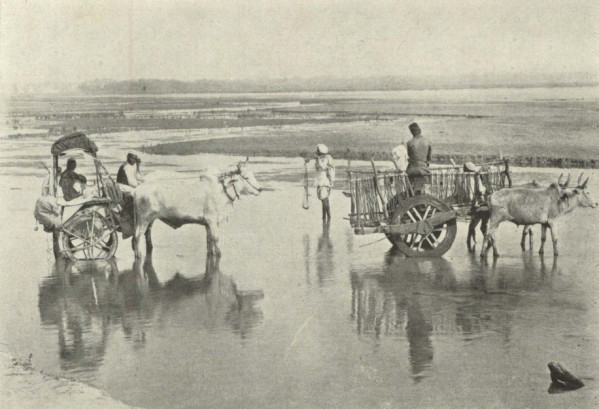
Fording an Indian river, c. 1905

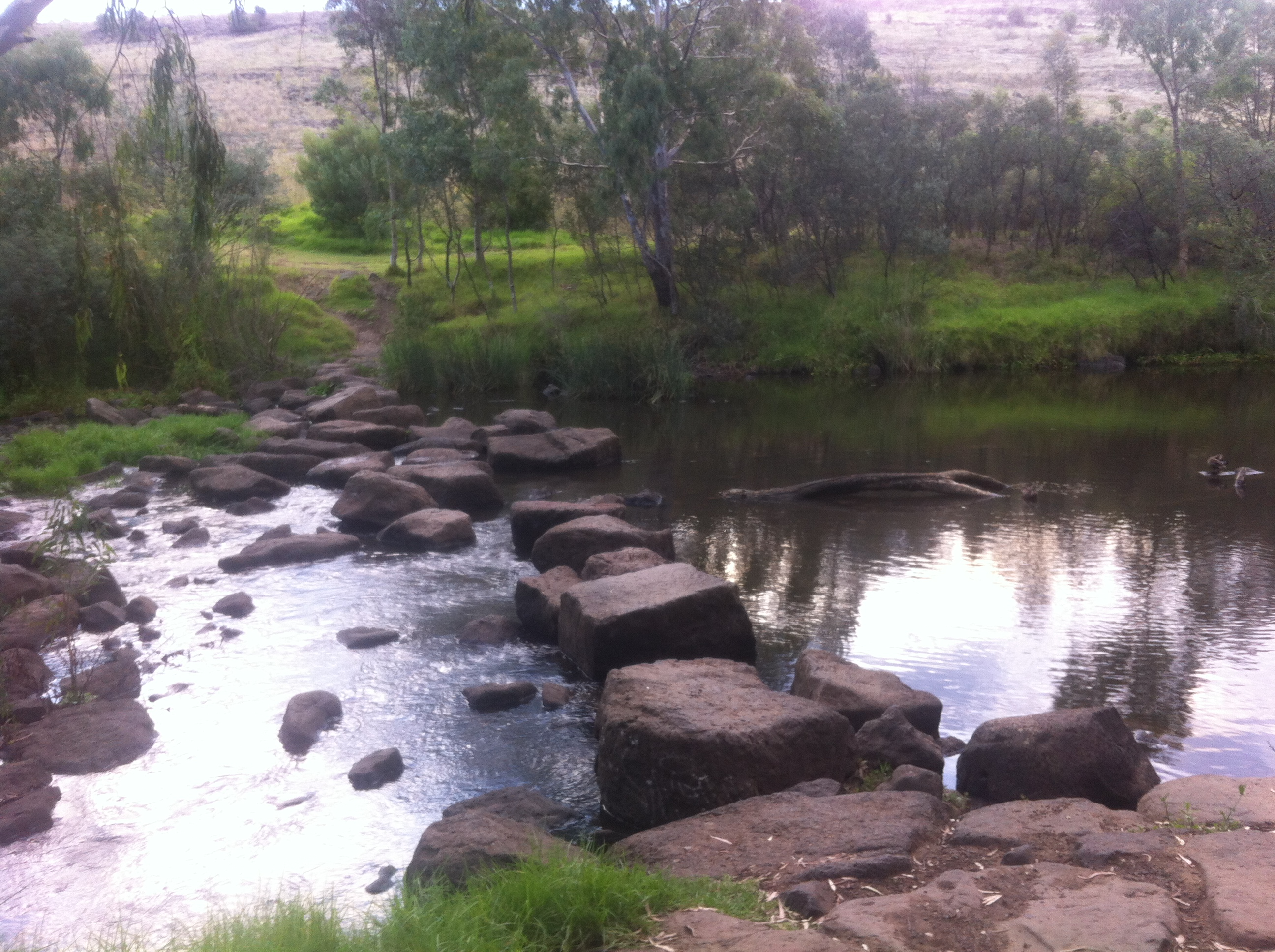
Solomon's Ford in Avondale Heights, Victoria was modernized in the 1980s at a spot where indigenous people had been crossing the Maribyrnong River for thousands of years.

== See also ==
- Causeway
- Brook
