= Cross Lanes =

Cross Lanes or Cross Lane may refer to one of these places:

- Cross Lanes, Cornwall, hamlet in England
- Cross Lane, settlement on the Isle of Wight, England
- Cross Lanes, Wrexham, hamlet in Wales
- Cross Lanes, West Virginia, settlement in United States
- Keslers Cross Lanes, West Virginia, unincorporated community in the United States

== See also ==
- Battle of Cross Lanes, battle of the American Civil War
