= Hunny =

Hunny may refer to:

- Hunny (band), an American rock band from Newbury Park, California
- "Hunny Hunny", a 1993 single by the synthpop band Book of Love
- Hunny B's, a breakfast cereal made by Kellogg's under license from Disney
- Hunny Hill, a suburb of Newport, Isle of Wight, England
- Hunny Madu, musician and radio host
- Honey, a misspelling, especially related to Winnie-the-Pooh

== See also ==
- Winnie-the-Pooh
