= Forest Side =

Hamlet on the Isle of Wight, England

- Hamlet
- Location within the Isle of Wight
- OS grid reference: SZ478897
- Civil parish: Newport and Carisbrooke
- Unitary authority: Isle of Wight
- Ceremonial county: Isle of Wight
- Region: South East
- Country: England
- Sovereign state: United Kingdom
- Post town: NEWPORT
- Postcode district: PO30
- Dialling code: 01983
- Police: Hampshire and Isle of Wight
- Fire: Hampshire and Isle of Wight
- Ambulance: Isle of Wight
- UK Parliament: Isle of Wight West

Forest Side is a hamlet on the Isle of Wight, off the south coast of England.

It is located to the east of the A3054 road, and adjacent to Parkhurst Forest. Forest Side is approximately 1.5 miles (2.4 km) north-west of Newport.

Forest Side lies 31 metres (102 ft) above sea level at the coordinates 50.70460129°N 1.32425662°W, with the Ordnance Survey National Grid reference SZ478897.
