= Albert Midlane =

British poet and hymn writer (1825–1909)

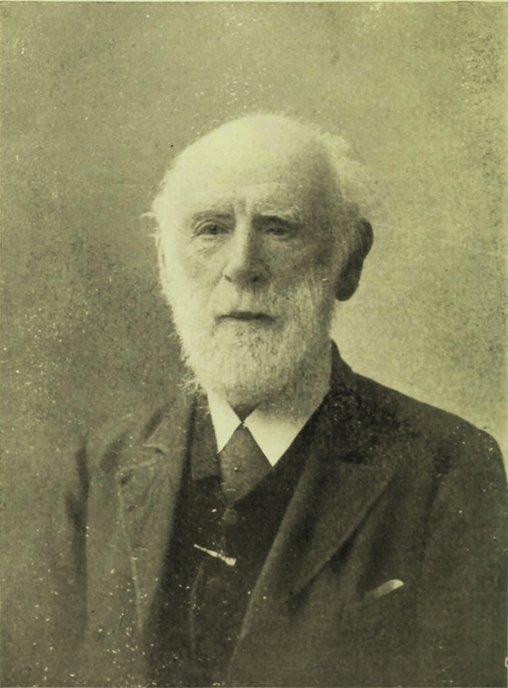
Albert Midlane

Albert Midlane (23 January 1825 – 27 February 1909) was a British poet who wrote several hundred hymns, most notably "There's a Friend for Little Children". He himself said that he had published 827 hymns, and that "They represent at all events a certain amount of industry".

== Life ==
Midlane was born in Carisbrooke, a village in Newport on the Isle of Wight, into a large family. He was the youngest child of James Midlane (who died in October 1824) and Frances Lawes. His mother, Frances, was a Congregationalist, and Midlane attended the church Sunday school from a young age. He first became an ironmonger, and later a Sunday school teacher. At the age of 23 he joined the Plymouth Brethren, but remained committed to Sunday school teaching and hymn writing. He was encouraged to start writing at a young age by his teacher, and he wrote his first hymn "Hark! in the presence of our God" in September 1842 while visiting Carisbrooke Castle; it was published in Youth's Magazine in November 1842 under the name of "Little Albert". His first hymn which brought his eventual fame was "God bless our Sunday schools", written on 24 May 1844, and used the National Anthem as its tune.

His most notable hymn, "There's a Friend for Little Children", was written on 7 February 1859 and published in December 1859 in a book called Good News for the Little Ones. Its tune was composed by Sir John Stainer, and is called "In Memoriam". It was composed for the hymn's appearance in a book entitled Hymns Ancient and Modern, published in 1868. Midlane wrote over 700 hymns altogether, though none had the success that "There's a Friend for Little Children" did; it has been translated into around a dozen languages. He later published several of his own hymn books, including Jewish Children's Hymn Book, Bright Blue Sky Hymn Book, Gospel Echoes Hymn Book and The Gospel Hall Hymn Book, each of which contained hundreds of his hymns.

Midlane wrote poems for the "Children's Column" of the Hampshire Independent. The paper set up a memorial fund for him after his death.

Midlane married Miriam Grainger on 20 March 1851 and they had three children, two sons and one daughter. He never accepted any money for his writing, and as such became bankrupt. Generosity from his fans meant that this was later revoked. He died of a seizure at his home of Forest Villa on South Mall, Newport, Isle of Wight on 27 February 1909, aged 84.
