= There's a Friend for Little Children =

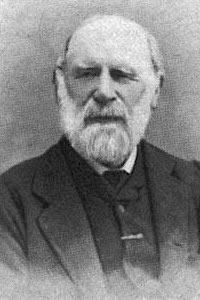
- Albert Midlane
- Genre: Hymn
- Written: 1859
- Text: Albert Midlane
- Based on: Mark 10:14-16
- Meter: 7.6.7.6 D
- Melody: "In Memoriam", Sir John Stainer

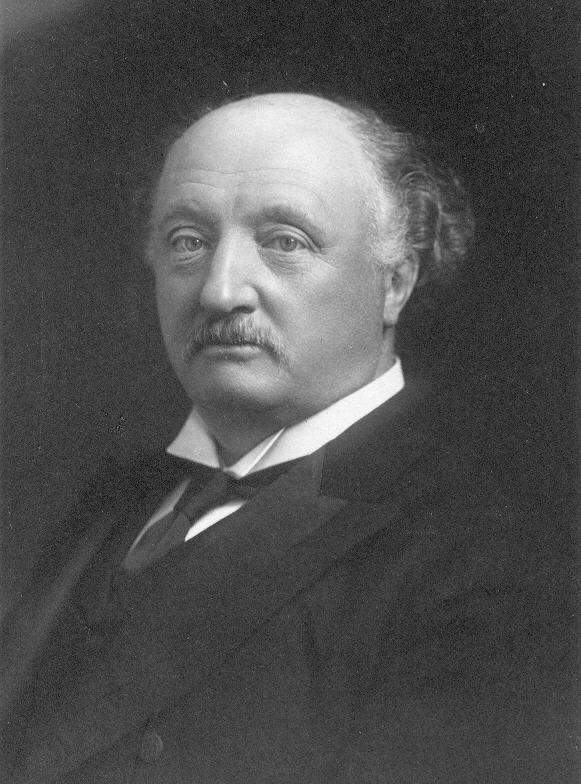
Sir John Stainer

"There's a Friend for Little Children" is a hymn written by Albert Midlane. It was written on the evening of 7 February 1859, and was known as "Above the Bright Blue Sky" before it was published. It first appeared in a book entitled Good News for the Little Ones in December 1859. The original verses were arranged differently, and its tune "In Memoriam" was composed in 1868 by Sir John Stainer during a committee meeting for the 1875 version of Hymns Ancient and Modern.
