= Ahnatal =

- Municipality
- Coat of arms

- Location of Ahnatal within Kassel district
- Interactive map of Ahnatal
- Location within Germany Location within Hesse
- Coordinates: 51°21′N 09°23′E
- Country: Germany
- State: Hesse
- Admin. region: Kassel
- District: Kassel

Government
  - Mayor (2020–26): Stefan Hänes (SPD)

Area
  - Total: 18.03 km^{2} (6.96 sq mi)
- Elevation: 265 m (869 ft)

Population (2025-12-31)
  - Total: 7,494
  - Density: 415.6/km^{2} (1,077/sq mi)
- Time zone: UTC+01:00 (CET)
  - Summer (DST): UTC+02:00 (CEST)
- Postal codes: 34292
- Dialling codes: 05609
- Vehicle registration: KS
- Website: www.ahnatal.de

Ahnatal is a municipality in the district of Kassel, in Hesse, Germany. It is situated roughly 9 km northwest of Kassel, Germany.

== Division of the municipality ==
It consists of three constituent villages, Weimar, Heckershausen, and Kammerberg.

== Notable places ==
Although not famous for any particular sights, the "Bühl" in Weimar attracted geological interest at the beginning of the 20th century as it is one of the very few places where elementary iron (i.e. no iron compounds) can be found. The former mine is now a lake which is popular as a swimming pool.

== Politics ==
From 1945 till 2008, Ahnatal has always had a social-democratic government. However, in the most recent elections of a mayor, the Christian-democratic candidate Michael Aufenanger was elected.
