= Apesdown =

Hamlet on the Isle of Wight

Coordinates: 50.684°N 1.356°W

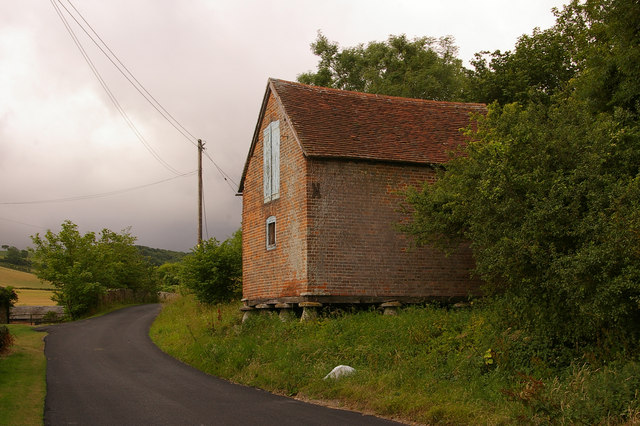
Old Granary

Apesdown is a hamlet on the Isle of Wight towards the west in an area known as West Wight. It is situated on the B3401 road between Carisbrooke and Calbourne, and approximately 2 miles (3.2 km) south-west of Newport. There is an old granary in the area, built on staddle stones.

Public transport is provided by Southern Vectis on route X11.

== Name ==
The name means 'the down belonging to the Abbess', from Middle English abbesse, abbodesse and Old English dūn. The Abbess is probably Alice, Abbess of Wilton, who was granted land in Carisbrooke in 1251. The spelling with -p- does not appear until the 15th century (original -b-).

Late 13th century: Abbessesdune

1299: Montem Abbatisse (Latin)

1335: Le Abbedessedon

1489: Apesdown
