= Louisa Murray =

English-born Canadian author (1818–1894)

Louisa Annie Murray
- Born: May 23, 1818; Carisbrooke, England
- Died: July 27, 1894 (aged 76); Stamford Township, Ontario, Canada
- Occupations: Teacher; author
- Writing career
- Years active: 1851–1894
- Notable works: Fauna, or the red flower of Leafy Hollow (1851); The cited curate (1863)

Louisa Annie Murray (23 May 1818 – 27 July 1894) was an English-born Canadian writer.

== Early life ==
Murray was born in Carisbrooke on the Isle of Wight, England, and was raised in County Wicklow in Ireland. Her father was Lieutenant Edward Murray and her mother, Louisa Rose Lyons, also came from a military family. She emigrated to Canada with her family in the 1840s because of the Great Famine; they settled on Wolfe Island (near Kingston, Ontario).

== Writing career ==
While working as a schoolteacher, she published several pieces in various literary magazines, particularly the Literary Garland in Montreal. However, this practice of publishing in magazines resulted in several of her works being irretrievably lost: one was accidentally set on fire, while at least two others were not recovered after the magazines that were to publish them closed.

Her novel Fauna was serialised due to the intercession of Susanna Moodie. This romantic description of Canadian life was published in the Literary Garland in 1851 and Mary S. Millar has noted that Murray defends the rights of Native Americans to preserve their culture from its domination by European values.

According to the Dictionary of Canadian Biography, Murray was "the major Canadian prose writer of the 1870s": she "bridged the period between the early Gothic and travel writing of pioneers such as Susanna Moodie and the generation of professional woman novelists and journalists at the turn of the century". Her writing largely reflected Victorian romantic traditions, but she was also interested in equality for women. She corresponded frequently with Susanna Moodie and mentored several younger Canadian women writers. Her novels described the Canadian backwoods and the role of pioneering women, which extended beyond the usual "domestic sphere". She also wrote nationalist essays, such as "An Appeal to Patriotic Canadians" (1889), and other nonfiction pieces; for example, her review of Sarah Anne Curzon's Laura Secord said that every Canadian "should make it a point of honour to possess a copy". She also wrote poetry.

== Death ==
Murray lived in a farm in Stamford near Niagara, Ontario where she died of dysentery in 1894. Despite being respected as a stylist in her own era, Murray was largely forgotten after her death, as few of her works were published outside of serials during her lifetime.
