= Rowridge =

Hamlet on the Isle of Wight, England

Coordinates: 50.6765°N 1.3686°W

- Hamlet
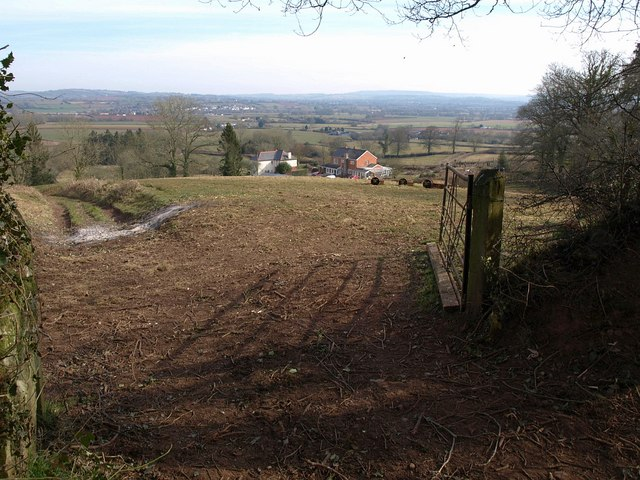
- Cottages near Rowridge

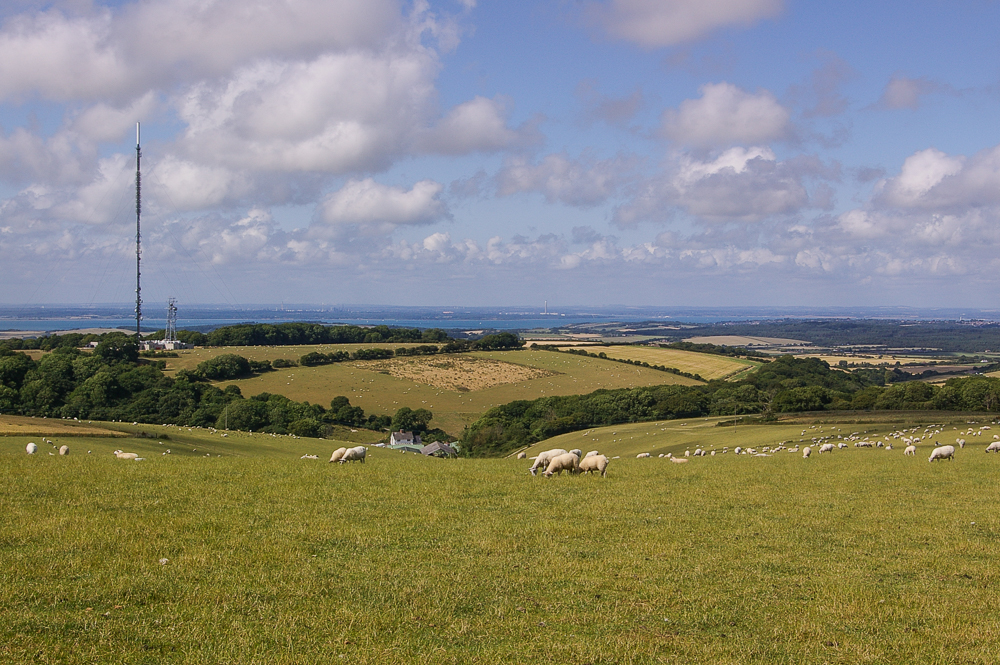
- Looking towards the Rowridge transmitting station

- Location within the Isle of Wight
- OS grid reference: SZ4493286287
- Civil parish: Newport and Carisbrooke
- Unitary authority: Isle of Wight
- Ceremonial county: Isle of Wight
- Region: South East
- Country: England
- Sovereign state: United Kingdom
- Post town: NEWPORT
- Postcode district: PO

Rowridge is a small hamlet on the Isle of Wight towards the west in an area known as West Wight. It is the location of the Rowridge transmitting station, a 149.6 metres (491 ft) tall guyed transmitting mast. It is in the civil parish of Newport and Carisbrooke.

== Name ==
The name means 'the rough ridge', from Old English rūh (dative case rūwan) and hrycg.

1227: Ruwerigge

~1241: Rurigge

1251: Roweruge

1335: Rogherigge

1431: Rowrigge

== See also ==
- Rowridge Transmitting Station
- Rowridge Valley
