= Staplers, Isle of Wight =

Coordinates: 50°42′02″N 1°16′33″W

Staplers
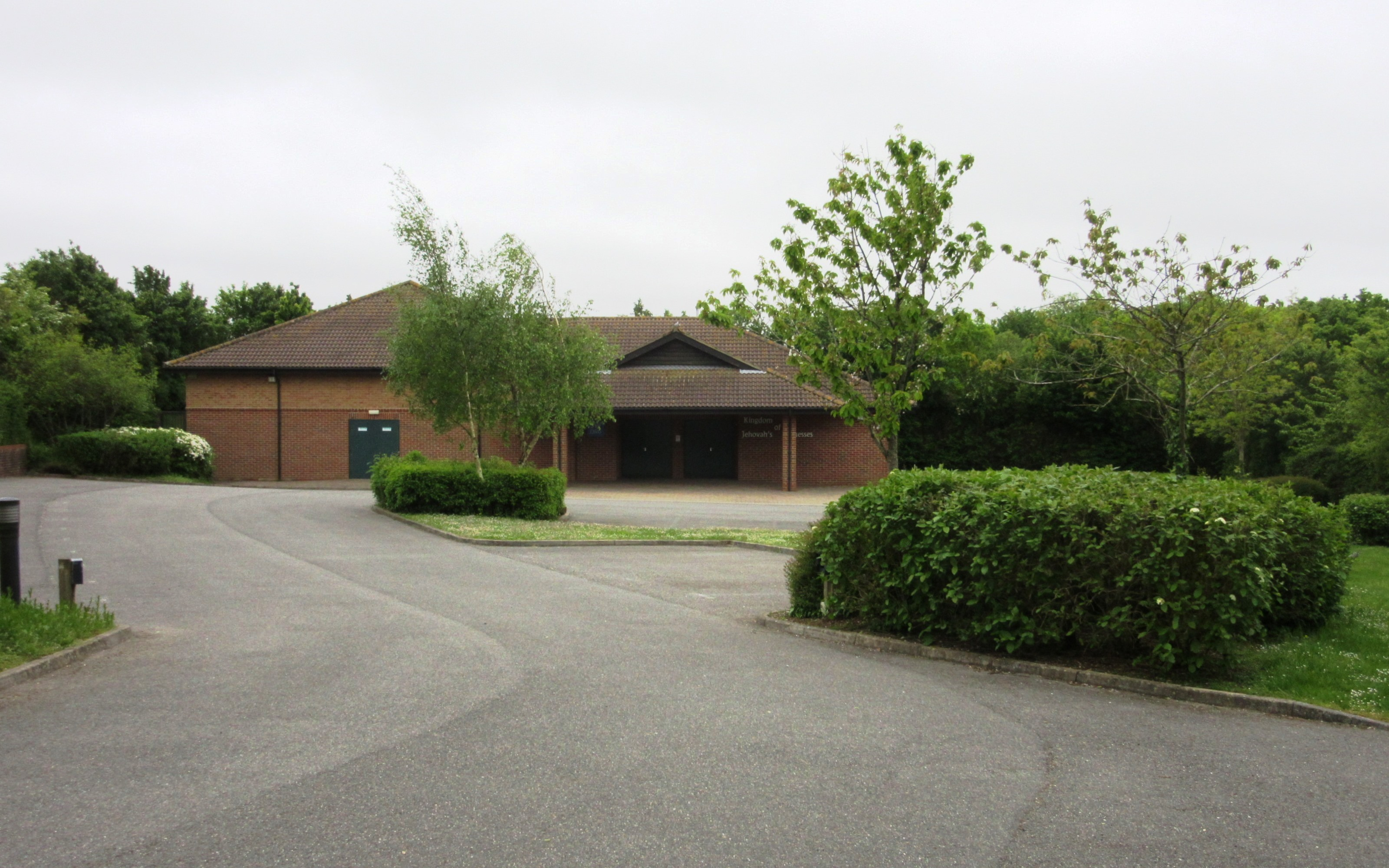
- Kingdom Hall

- Location within the Isle of Wight
- Civil parish: Newport and Carisbrooke
- Unitary authority: Isle of Wight
- Ceremonial county: Isle of Wight
- Region: South East
- Country: England
- Sovereign state: United Kingdom
- Police: Hampshire and Isle of Wight
- Fire: Hampshire and Isle of Wight
- Ambulance: Isle of Wight

Staplers (/ˈstæplərz/ STAP-lərz) is a suburb of Newport, in the civil parish of Newport and Carisbrooke, on the Isle of Wight, England, on the east side of the River Medina just under a mile from the town centre.

It was previously part of Arreton Manor and a grange of Quarr Abbey. Maps from the nineteenth century show the hamlets of Staplers, North Staplers and Little Staplers, as well as the geographic features Staplers Hill, Staplers Heath and Staplers Copse, as well as Staplers Turnpike and Staplers Farm.

It houses the Crown Offices which discharge the principal functions of the national government on the Isle of Wight such as the Department for Work and Pensions. There is a pub called "The Princess Royal".

Transport is provided by Southern Vectis bus routes 8 and 9.

Staplers also has a large housing estate consisting of mainly bungalows and three-bedroom houses, situated on Cynthia Grove, Fairmount Drive, Mayfield Drive, Bellecroft Drive, Oak Road, Greenfields Road, Cooper Road, Cook Avenue and Atkinson Drive. 'Polars' nursing home is situated in Staplers Road.

== Name ==
The name means 'the wooded hill where posts are obtained, from Old English stapol and hyrst. Stapelhurst in Kent has the same origin.

1235: Stapelhurst

~1250: Stapelhirst

~1300: Stapelherst

1608: Staplurste

1769: Staplers (Heath)
