= Shide, Isle of Wight =

Human settlement on the Isle of Wight, England

Coordinates: 50.692°N 1.292°W

Shide
- Suburb
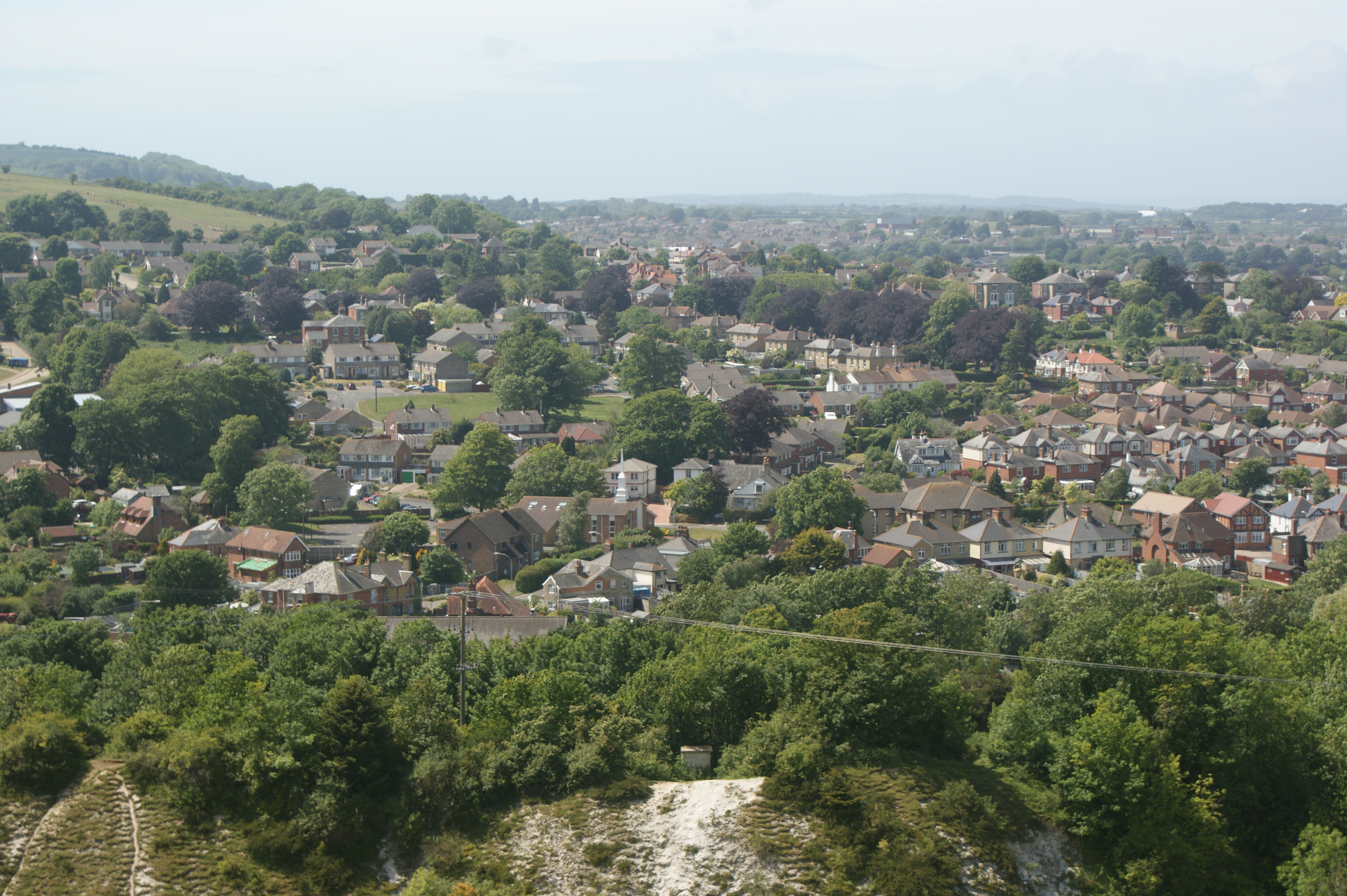
- The view of Shide from St George's Down, with other areas of Newport in the background, and the Shide Chalk Pit in the foreground.

- Location within the Isle of Wight
- OS grid reference: SZ5027688193
- Civil parish: Newport and Carisbrooke
- Unitary authority: Isle of Wight
- Ceremonial county: Isle of Wight
- Region: South East
- Country: England
- Sovereign state: United Kingdom
- Post town: NEWPORT
- Postcode district: PO
- Police: Hampshire and Isle of Wight
- Fire: Hampshire and Isle of Wight
- Ambulance: Isle of Wight

Shide is a small settlement in the civil parish of Newport and Carisbrooke, on the Isle of Wight, England, some of which is considered to be in the Newport conurbation.

Shide Hill House, which was demolished in the 1970s, was situated with its back towards St. George's Lane and Pan Chalk Pit with the reception rooms looking westwards across the Blackwater Road, river and railway to the open fields on the other side of the valley. It was the home and workplace of John Milne (1850–1913), inventor of the horizontal pendulum seismograph after he retired from the Imperial College of Engineering in Tokyo, Japan. Still left today is the Gatehouse to the estate at the bottom of St George's Lane and the Domestic Quarters, now known as Milne House, which were attached to the original building going up the lane. The Observatory, housed in the stable block, was dismantled and moved to Oxford in 1919 when Tone Milne returned to Japan and the estate was sold for development. However, the Laboratory Block still exists and is the building facing into the fields towards Blackwater.

The Isle of Wight County Cricket Ground is just south of Shide.

There is a cycleway between Shide and Merstone, and public transport is provided by Southern Vectis buses on route 2, 3 and 38.

Shide railway station was opened in 1875 and closed in 1956.

== Name ==
The nams means '(the place at) the plank or footbridge, from Old English scīd. The first bridge here (over the River Medina) was probably a plank of wood. A bridge is mentioned in the 13th century as pontem de ssyde (the bridge of Shide), and as schidhambrigge (the bridge at the Shide river-meadow, including Old English hamm).

1086: Side, Sida

1189-1204: Side

~1230: Schida

1250-1260: Shide

1387: Shyde

1769: Shide

== Shide Quarry ==
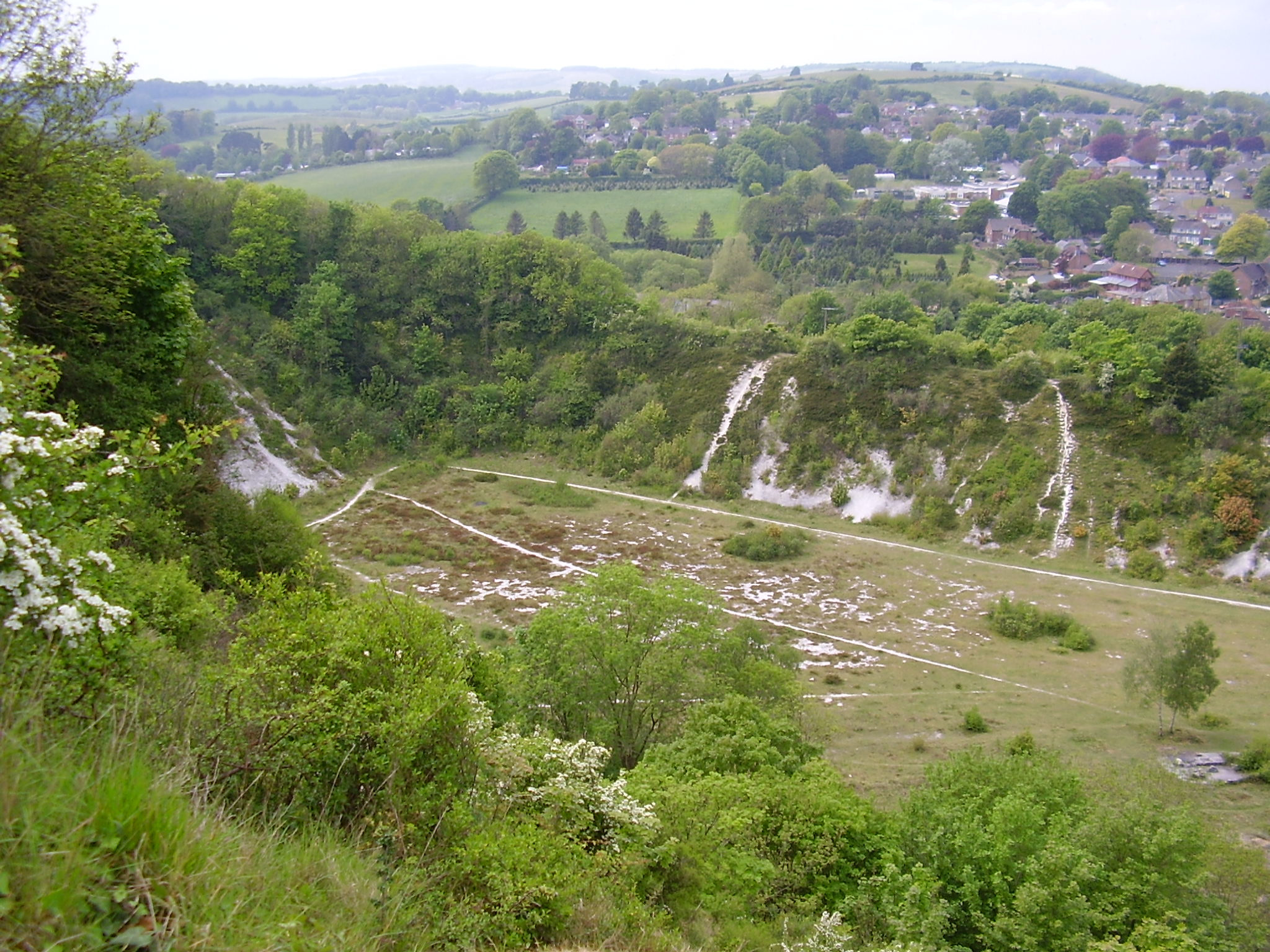
Shide Quarry

Shide Quarry, located to the east of the village was quarried for chalk during the first half of 20th Century. The prominent west-facing slope is a major landmark on Newport's skyline. The site is now a Site of Special Scientific Interest (SSSI) and Local Nature Reserve owned by the Isle of Wight Council. It is open to the public. The site was notified in 1971 for its biological features which show all stages of succession from bare chalk rock to Ash woodland. It is one of 41 SSSIs on the Isle of Wight.
