= Carisbrooke =

Village on the Isle of Wight, England

Coordinates: 50.6917°N 1.3172°W

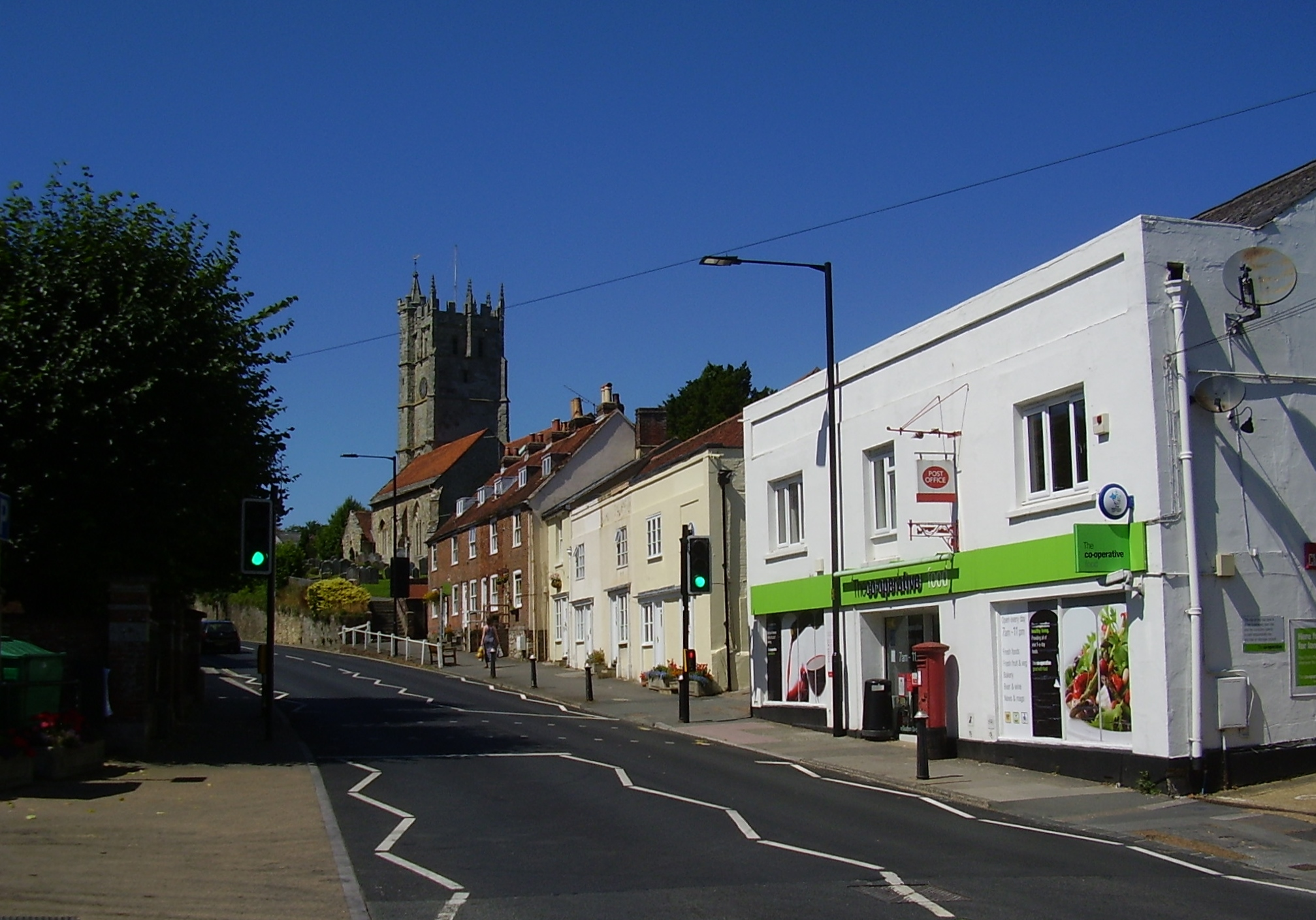
- Carisbrooke High Street

- Location within the Isle of Wight
- Population: 3,547 (2011, ward)
- OS grid reference: SZ483882
- Civil parish: Newport and Carisbrooke
- Unitary authority: Isle of Wight
- Ceremonial county: Isle of Wight
- Region: South East
- Country: England
- Sovereign state: United Kingdom
- Post town: Newport
- Postcode district: PO30
- Dialling code: 01983
- Police: Hampshire and Isle of Wight
- Fire: Hampshire and Isle of Wight
- Ambulance: Isle of Wight
- UK Parliament: Isle of Wight West

Carisbrooke is a village on the south-western outskirts of Newport, in the civil parish of Newport and Carisbrooke, Isle of Wight, England. It is best known as the site of Carisbrooke Castle. It also has a medieval parish church, St Mary's Church (overlooking the High Street, with views to the castle), which began as part of a Benedictine priory established by French monks c. 1150. The priory was dissolved by King Henry V of England in 1415, during the Hundred Years' War. In 1907, the church was restored. It has a 14th-century tower rising in five stages with a turret at one corner and a battlemented and pinnacled crown.

A Roman Villa was discovered in the Victorian era on the site of the old vicarage.

== Name ==
The name might mean 'the brook called Cary', from Cary (lost Celtic river-name, identical with the River Cary, Somerset, perhaps meaning 'pleasant stream') and Old English brōc. If the previous meaning is incorrect, Cary may have been the old name of Lukely Brook, a stream running through the village. An older name of Carisbrooke may have been Wihtwaraburh, meaning 'the stronghold of the people of Wight', from Wight (Modern English version), -ware and burh, perhaps referring to an ancient fort on the site of Carisbrooke Castle. This always appears in 6th century sources Wihtgaraburh, probably being associated with Wihtgār, a Jutish chieftain mentioned in the Anglo-Saxon Chronicle.

12th century: Caresbroc, Caresbroke, Karesbrok, Karisbroch

1324: Carisbrok

1393: Casebroke

== Transport ==
Carisbrooke is served by Southern Vectis buses operating to Freshwater, Newport, Yarmouth and Ventnor, as well as some smaller villages. It was served by nearby Carisbrooke railway station until the line from Newport to Freshwater closed in 1953. It is the starting point of the Tennyson Trail, leading to Alum Bay and the Needles.

== Local amenities ==
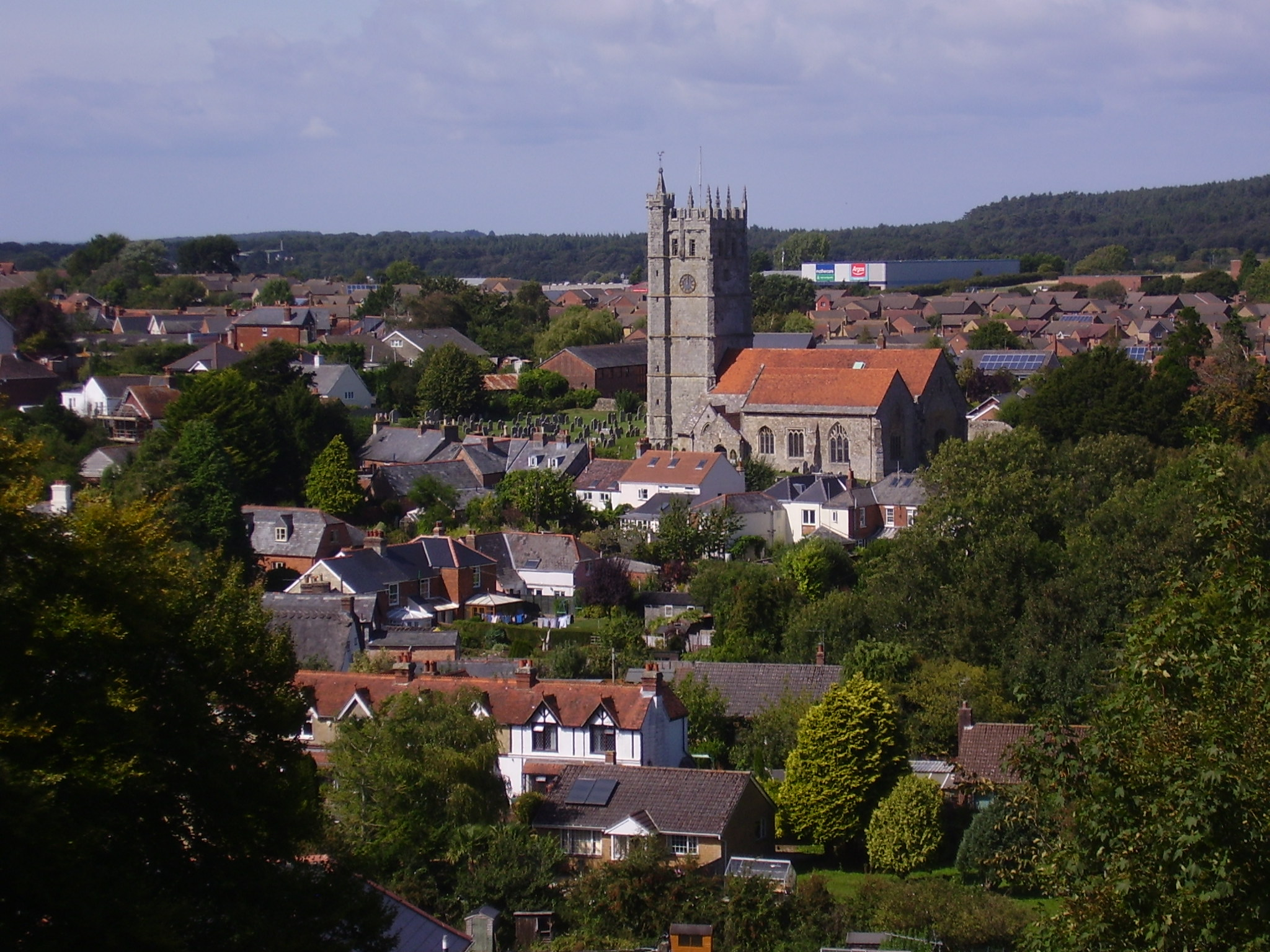
View of the village from the castle ramparts

Carisbrooke has two pubs – the Waverley and the Eight Bells – an Italian restaurant and a motorcycle dealership. There are several shops on the High Street. The village has four schools, three of which are located along Wellington Road. These are Carisbrooke CE Primary School, Christ the King College (formerly Archbishop King Roman Catholic Middle and Trinity CE Middle Schools) and Carisbrooke College. The fourth school is St Thomas of Canterbury Roman Catholic Primary School, which is on Carisbrooke High Street next to the doctors' surgery. There are allotments next to the ford in Castle Street.

== History ==
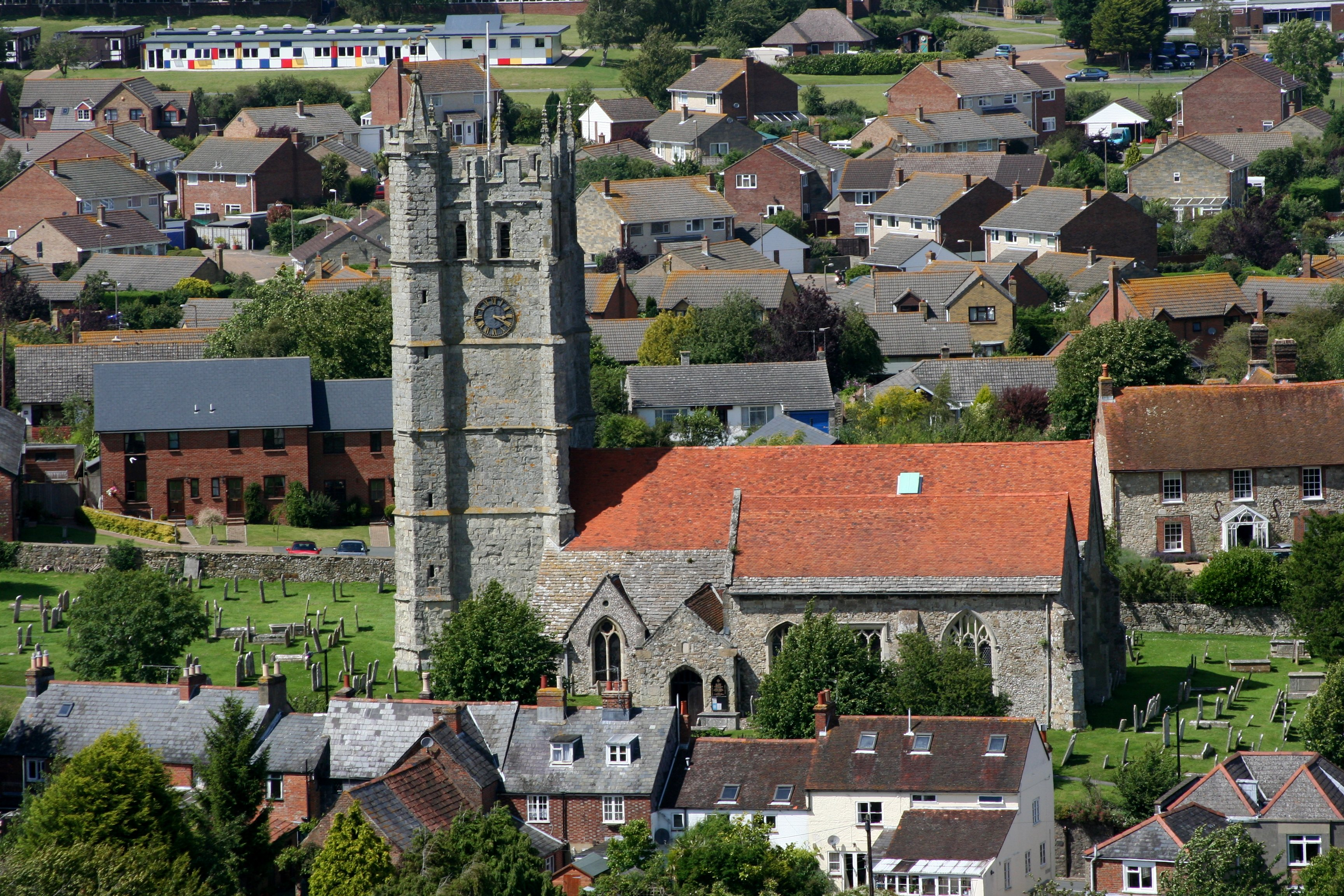
St Mary's Church, Carisbrooke

Carisbrooke was for centuries the island's capital. It is not mentioned in Domesday Book, however, which names Bowcombe as the largest and most populous manor on the Isle of Wight. The latter name now applies to a hamlet about a mile to the south-west of Carisbrooke but is inferred to be the name of the village at the time of the Great Survey of 1086. The 18th-century antiquarian Sir Richard Worsley, in The History of the Isle of Wight, conjectured that Boucombe, or Beaucombe, means “pleasant valley”; however, modern place-name dictionaries propose “Bofa's valley” or “above the valley” as alternative interpretations.

In 1086, the manor of Bowcombe was held by William the Conqueror, having previously belonged to Edward the Confessor. There were 60 households, with land for 15 ploughs, 8 acres of meadow, and woodland for five swine. There were also two mills and a church held by the monks of Lyre Abbey. The annual value of manor was £24.

Alexander Ross, a prolific Scottish writer and controversialist, was vicar of Carisbrooke from 1634 until his death in 1654.

The site of the old Carisbrooke railway station lies in the grounds of Christ the King College, in the lower part of the field, which is at the end of Purdy Road. The bank is all that remains of the old line.

When in 1917 the British royal family changed its name from the "House of Saxe-Coburg-Gotha" to the "House of Windsor" and renounced all German titles, the title of Marquess of Carisbrooke was created for the erstwhile German Prince Alexander of Battenberg.

In 1931, the civil parish had a population of 5,232. On 1 April 1933, the parish was abolished and merged with Newport.

== Carisbrooke Castle ==
Carisbrooke Castle was originally a Roman fort, which was built on the site an ancient fort. The castle is at the top of Castle Hill. It was built soon after William the Conqueror came to England. The William FitzOsbern, 1st Earl of Hereford may have been responsible for its construction, but he was killed in battle during 1071 and so would have had little opportunity to oversee the construction. Osbern's son, Roger, is more likely to have built or refortified the castle. It was at Carisbrooke Castle that William arrested his own half brother, Odo for acts of treason.

King Henry I of England granted the castle in the first year of his reign to Richard de Redvers. The Redvers family owned the castle for much of the Medieval period, only ending in November 1293 when the last Redvers, Isabel died. In 1136, Baldwin de Redvers took refuge in the castle on the run from King Stephen of England. The wells on the island ran dry and Baldwin gave up the land in exchange for his head. Baldwin's land was restored to him in 1153 when Henry II became king. Baldwin, the last male in the line, died in 1216 poisoned, it is said by Peter II of Savoy. Isabella de Fortibus, Baldwin's sister took control of the castle and successfully ran it until her death in 1293. After the death of Isabella de Fortibus in 1293 the castle became the property of Edward I and the crown.

In 1355, Edward III granted the ownership of the castle to his eldest daughter, Isabella. In 1377, a French force landed on the Isle of Wight and besieged Carisbrooke castle. The castle did not fall to the French. Later, in 1647, Charles I took refuge at Carisbrooke, but the castle later became his prison, from where he attempted several times to escape but failed. His second daughter, Princess Elizabeth, later died there in 1650, aged 14.

The castle later became the royal residence of Princess Beatrice, the ninth daughter of Queen Victoria, who put in the gardens which have been recently restored. She established the museum in the centre of the bailey.

== Cultural references ==
The Romantic poet John Keats lodged in Carisbrooke while touring the Isle of Wight in April 1817. In a letter to John Hamilton Reynolds, he wrote, “I see Carisbrooke Castle from my window, and have found several delightful wood-alleys, and copses, and quick freshes”. Finding Carisbrooke to be cheaper than Shanklin, and more convenient for exploring the Island on foot, Keats observed an abundance of primroses and described a view of the mainland “from a little hill nearby”. He started work on Endymion at Carisbrooke.

Carisbrooke appears as "Chalkburne" in the 1886 novel The Silence of Dean Maitland by Maxwell Gray. It is also an important location in John Meade Falkner's novel Moonfleet.

== Notable people ==
- William Bromley, (born 1769), an engraver
- Louisa Murray (born 1818), poet and writer
- Albert Midlane (born 1825), poet
- Gertrude Fenton (died 1884), novelist and editor of The Carisbrooke Magazine
- Princess Beatrice, youngest daughter of Queen Victoria, lived at Carisbrooke Castle as Governor of the Isle of Wight
