= Fairlee, Isle of Wight =

Coordinates: 50.70816°N 1.2842°W

Fairlee
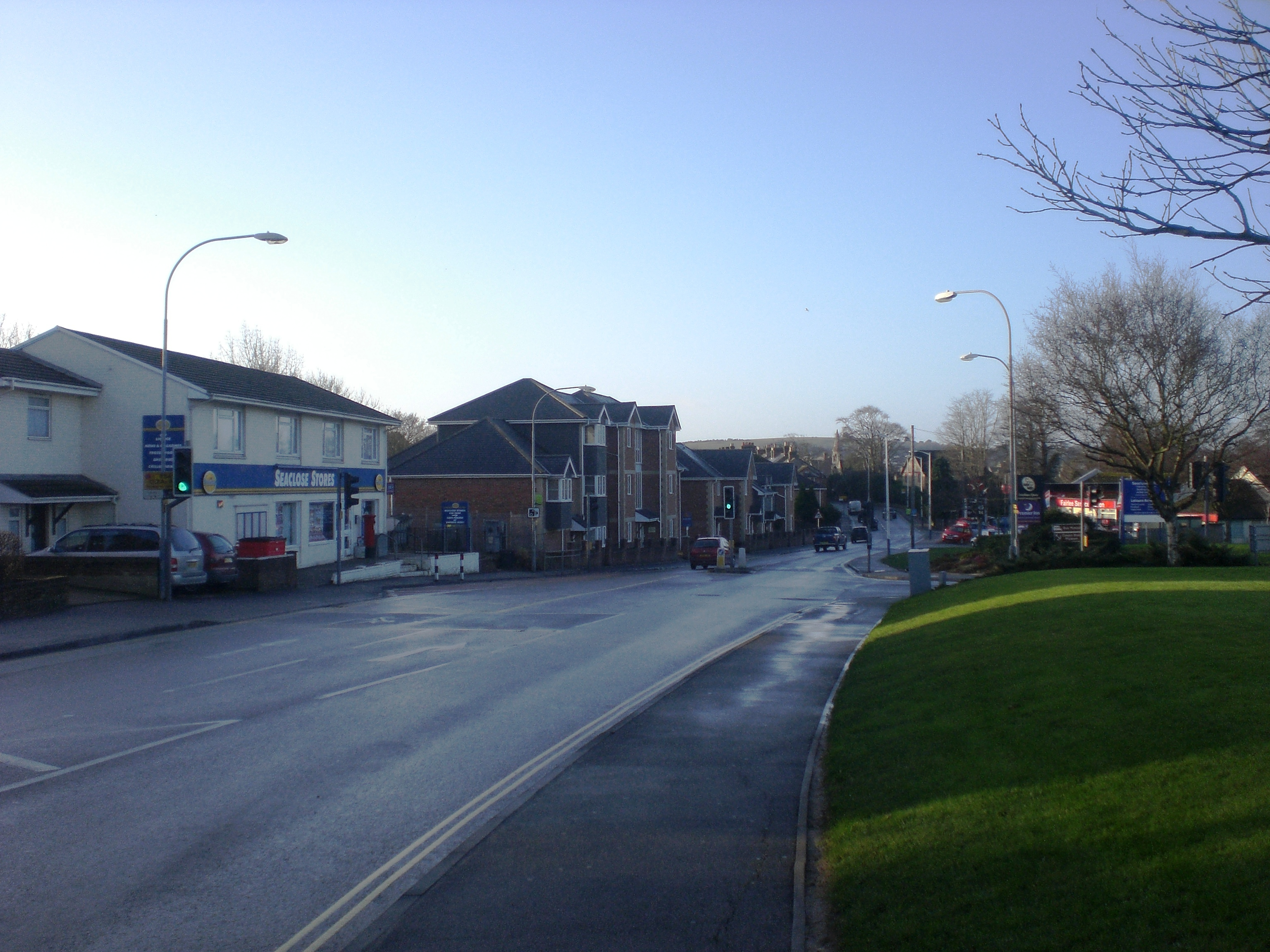
- Fairlee Road, with Seaclose stores on the left and Fairlee Service station in the distance on the right.

- Location within the Isle of Wight
- OS grid reference: SZ506900
- Unitary authority: Isle of Wight
- Ceremonial county: Isle of Wight
- Region: South East
- Country: England
- Sovereign state: United Kingdom
- Post town: NEWPORT
- Postcode district: PO30 2
- Dialling code: 01983
- Police: Hampshire and Isle of Wight
- Fire: Hampshire and Isle of Wight
- Ambulance: Isle of Wight
- UK Parliament: Isle of Wight West

Fairlee is a suburb of Newport, on the Isle of Wight in South East England, on the east side of the River Medina. Fairlee Road runs through the area. During a week in June each year the main road northbound is completely closed to vehicles during the Isle of Wight Festival. Located on the Island is the Fairlee Creek Natural reserve, which is a haven for wildlife and popular with tourism on the island. Fairlee Service Station, Seaclose Stores and the Mountbatten Centre, with Medina High School are located in the area.
