= Hunny Hill =

Suburb of Newport, Isle of Wight

Coordinates: 50.7045°N 1.3011°W

- Suburb
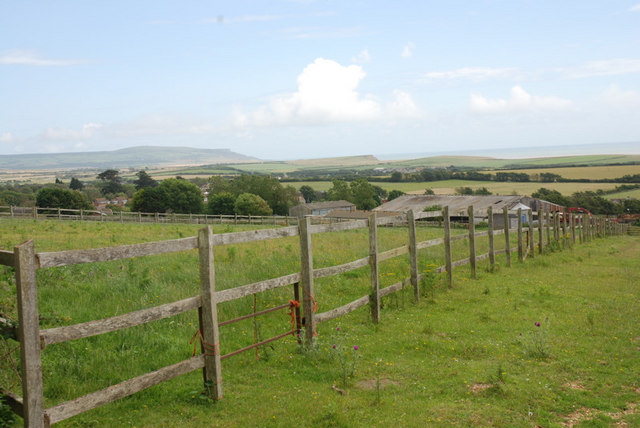
- Hunny Hill Farm, on the outskirts of Hunny Hill

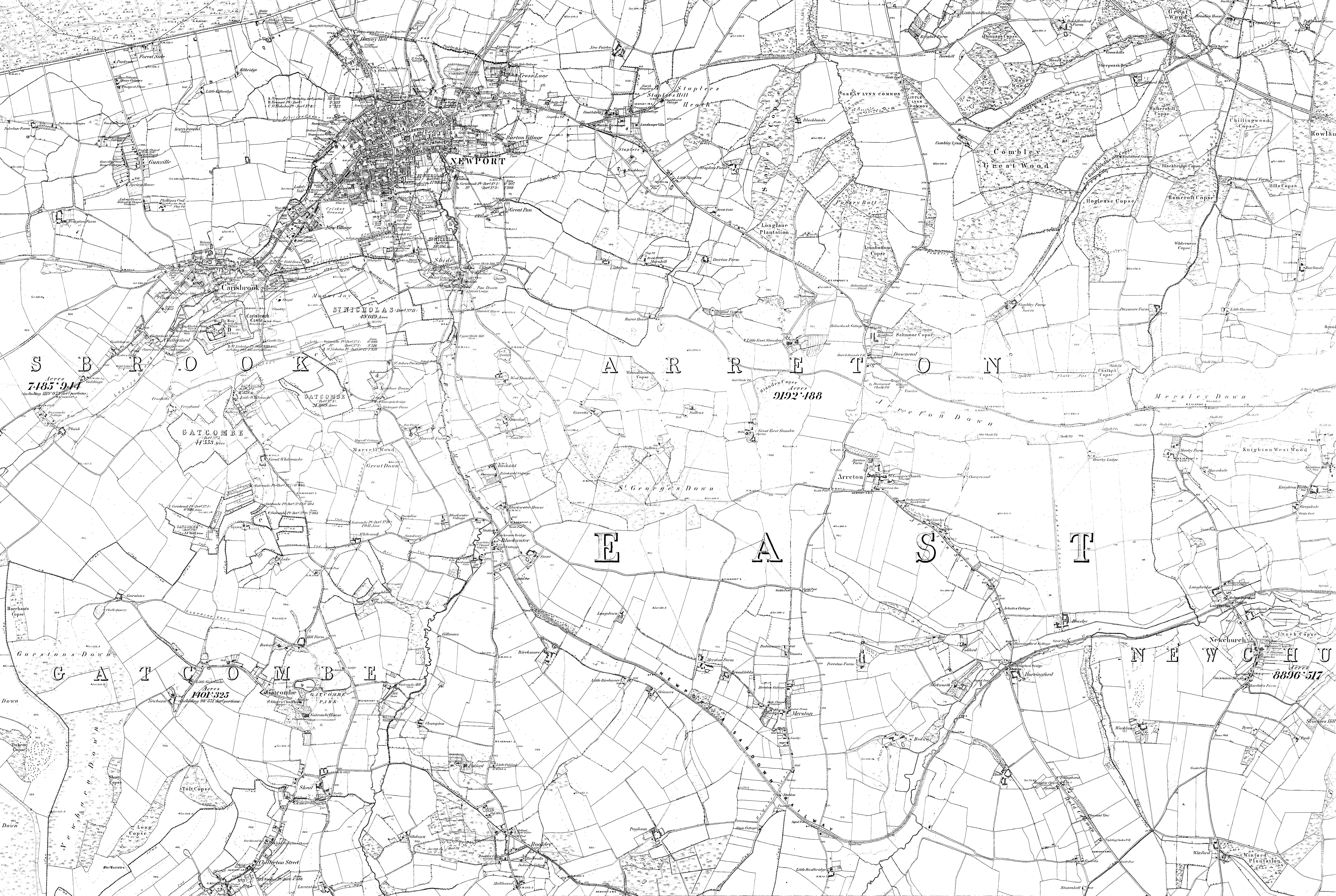
- An old OS map featuring Hunny Hill, 1866–1889

- Location within the Isle of Wight
- OS grid reference: SZ4944989664
- Civil parish: Newport and Carisbrooke
- Unitary authority: Isle of Wight
- Ceremonial county: Isle of Wight
- Region: South East
- Country: England
- Sovereign state: United Kingdom
- Post town: NEWPORT
- Police: Hampshire and Isle of Wight
- Fire: Hampshire and Isle of Wight
- Ambulance: Isle of Wight

Hunny Hill is a suburb of the town of Newport, in the civil parish of Newport and Carisbrooke, on the Isle of Wight, England, located in the north west of the town. It is situated 0.7 kilometres (0.43 mi) from the centre of Newport, which is the county town of the Isle of Wight, and is 4 miles (6.4 km) south of Cowes. The south of the suburb is located on the Lukely Brook which leads into the River Medina. To the east is the A3020 road.

The Isle Of Wight College is located opposite the suburb.

== Name ==
The name means 'the hill where wild honey is found', from Old English hunig and hyll.

1228–1238: Hunihille

1274: Hunyhille

1289: Honihill

~1300: Honihull

1769: Hony Hill
