= Ahnatal-Weimar =

Place in Hesse, Germany

Coordinates: 51°21′58″N 9°23′34″E

Weimar is the oldest part of the municipality of Ahnatal. It is a village situated close to the Dörnberg some 15 km northwest of Kassel and has about 3500 inhabitants. Being close to the city of Kassel, most people who live in Weimar are commuters who work in the city of Kassel. There are no large-scale firms in Weimar and in Ahnatal in general. Its main sight is the Bühl, a former pit which was left open after a source leaked into it. It is now being used as a swimming pool, and in the nearby area, there are sports and recreational facilities. The education system consists of a primary school (Helfensteinschule) which pupils can attend until they reach the sixth grade after which they have to go to a secondary school. The "Helfensteinschule" is attended also by pupils from Kammerberg.

== History ==
Its history dates back to 1097 when it was first mentioned in a donation record of a monastery. In Weimar, the name of which is supposed to mean "sacred water", there was a monastery which is at the place of the Lutheran church. Weimar's population was mainly dominated by workers in factories in the nearby city of Kassel and also in the quarry which now forms the Bühl. Although there was an anti-aircraft base during World War II close to the village, it was not heavily damaged in the bomb raids. After World War II Weimar was occupied by American soldiers. In the 1970s, it was merged with Heckershausen to form the municipality of Ahnatal.
