= Cross Lane =

Coordinates: 50.703332°N 1.284337°W

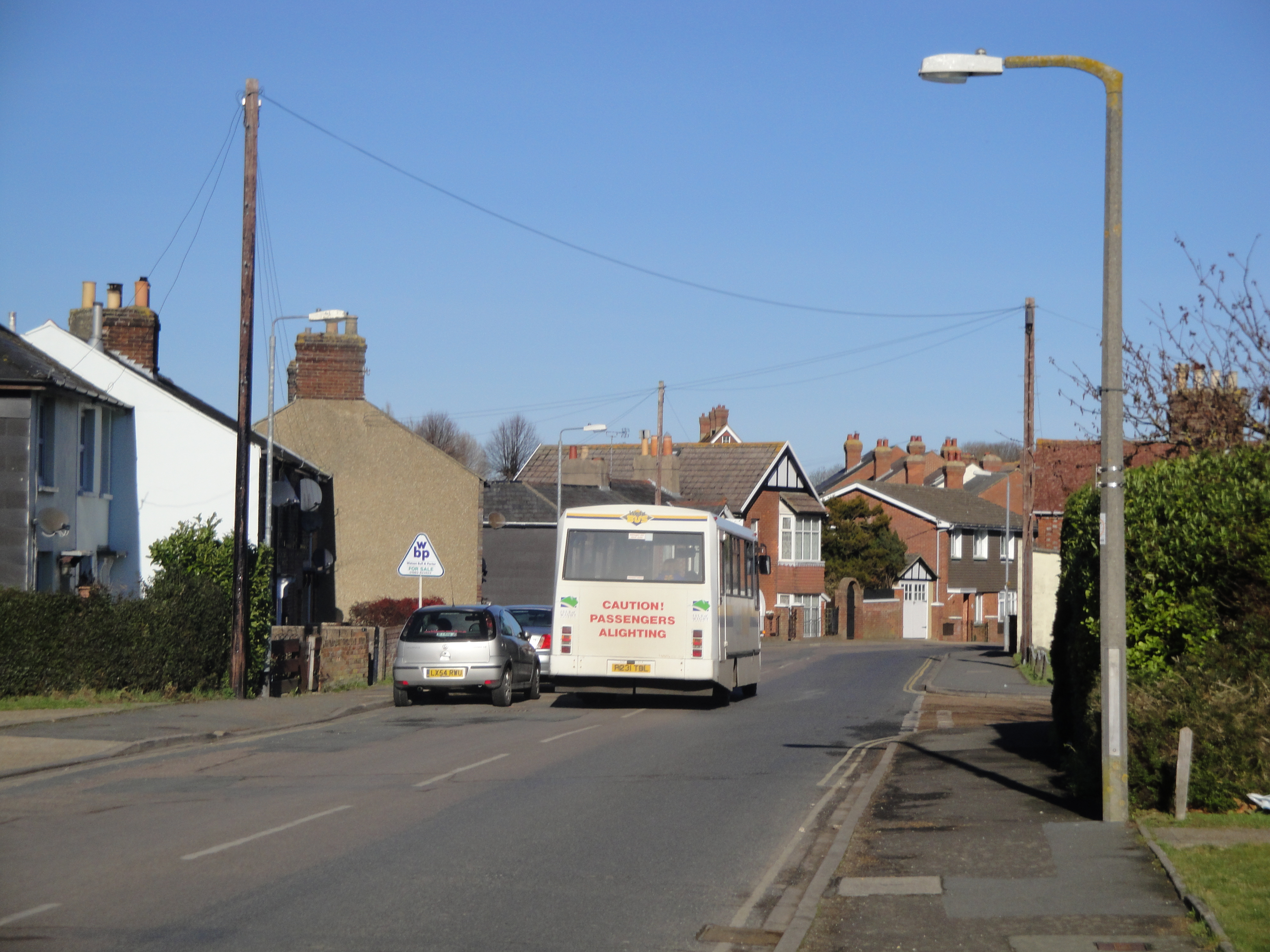

- Location within the Isle of Wight
- OS grid reference: SZ506897
- Unitary authority: Isle of Wight
- Ceremonial county: Isle of Wight
- Region: South East
- Country: England
- Sovereign state: United Kingdom
- Post town: NEWPORT
- Postcode district: PO30
- Dialling code: 01983
- Police: Hampshire and Isle of Wight
- Fire: Hampshire and Isle of Wight
- Ambulance: Isle of Wight
- UK Parliament: Isle of Wight West

Cross Lane is a settlement on the Isle of Wight, off the south coast of England.

The hamlet is a suburb of the county town of Newport, and is located on the A3054 road, to the north-east of the town.
