= Bowcombe =

Hamlet on the Isle of Wight, England

Coordinates: 50°40′44″N 1°20′17″W

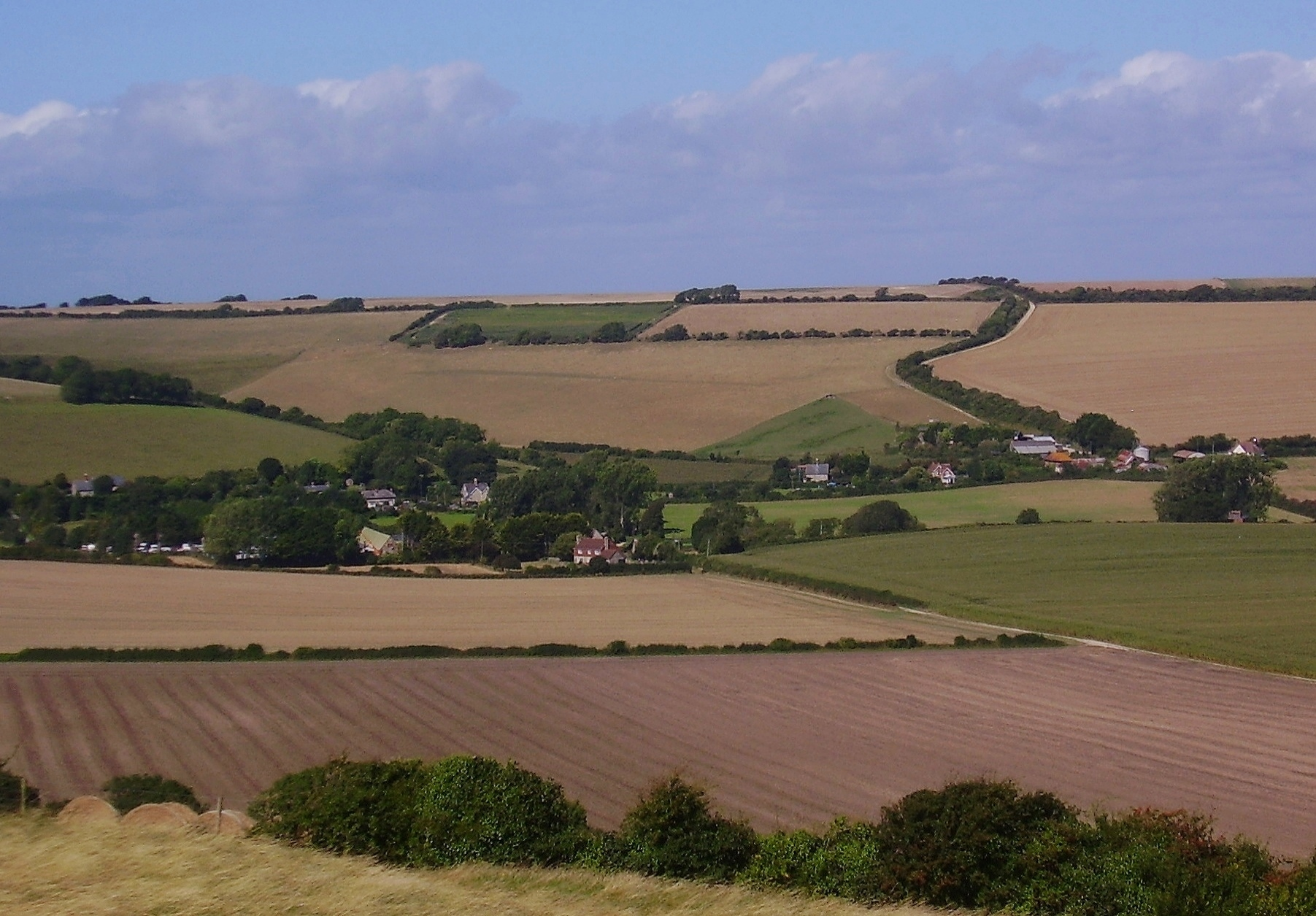
- The hamlet of Bowcombe

- Location within the Isle of Wight
- OS grid reference: SZ4686
  - London: 78 miles (126 km) NE
- Unitary authority: Isle of Wight
- Ceremonial county: Isle of Wight
- Region: South East
- Country: England
- Sovereign state: United Kingdom
- Post town: Newport
- Postcode district: PO30
- Dialling code: 01983
- Police: Hampshire and Isle of Wight
- Fire: Hampshire and Isle of Wight
- Ambulance: Isle of Wight
- UK Parliament: Isle of Wight West

Bowcombe is a hamlet on the Isle of Wight. It has an elevation of 144 feet (44 m) and is located 2 1/2 miles (4 km) southwest of Newport in the centre of the Island. Public transport is provided by Southern Vectis buses on route 12.

== Name ==
The name possibly means 'the valley belonging to a man called Bofa', from Old English Bofa (personal name) and cumb. The name would have been transferred to the hamlet from Bowcombe Down. There is an incorrect theory that it means 'fair valley', from the French beau.

1086: Bovecome, Bouecome

1141-1143: Boecombe

1185: Bouecumba

1255: Bouecombe

1299: Bowcombe

1635: Buccomb

== Geography ==
The hamlet gives its name to the nearby Bowcombe Down and 2000-acre Bowcombe View Shooting Ground. The down is home to a listed historical site that contains a Bronze Age barrow and an Anglo-Saxon cemetery.

== History ==
Bowcombe was mentioned in Domesday Book at the time it had 60 households, which was very large for a settlement at the time, with a total value of £20 in 1066. It was the name of a Hundred, with meetings being held there.

In 1870–72 John Marius said of the village in the Imperial Gazetteer "Bowcombe vale, around it, formerly displayed much beauty, but has suffered by destruction of its wood." In the account, it describes that to the west there are traces of a Roman road and that it "commands a rich and extensive view." At the time it had a population of 93.

On 15 October 1940, a Messerschmitt Bf 109, piloted by Fedwebel Horst Hellriegel, was returning from a raid on the Mainland when it crash-landed up Bowcombe Down.

== Notable residents ==
- Sir William Stephens (c. 1641 – 1697) Member of Parliament.
