= 2013 Isle of Wight Council election =

2013 UK local government election

- 2 May 2013

All 40 seats to the Isle of Wight Council 21 seats needed for a majority
- Turnout: 35.4%
	First party	Second party	Third party
Party	Conservative	Island Independents	UKIP
Last election	24	New Party	Did not stand
Seats won	15	15	2
Seat change	▼9	▲15	▲2
	Fourth party	Fifth party
Party	Labour	Liberal Democrats
Last election	1	5
Seats won	2	1
Seat change	▲1	▼4

2013 local election results on the Isle of Wight

The 2013 Isle of Wight Council election was held on 2 May 2013 to elect all 40 members for a four-year term to the Isle of Wight Council, a unitary authority which governs the Isle of Wight. Going into the election, the Conservative Party was looking to gain a third term in power after first being elected to overall control in 2005, but in one of the shock results of the wider local elections being held in the country, the Conservatives lost overall control of the council, having been reduced to 15 seats, 6 short of a majority of 21. The 'Island Independents', a mutually supporting group of candidates and councillors running as independents, gained the same number of seats, whilst other independents, UKIP, Labour, and a Liberal Democrat made up the remainder.

Emblematic of the election, the Conservative leader of the council, David Pugh, lost his own seat to an Island Independent. The popular perception of the reasons for the Conservative losses was, in the words of OnTheWight, 'It's widely thought that the way they implemented the financial cuts turned the Island against them. Particularly unpopular was the wholesale closing of the Tourist Information centres and public toilets.' With neither the Conservatives or the Island Independents gaining a majority outright, control of the authority was initially in doubt, but on 8 May the Island Independents announced the five non-aligned independents would be joining their group.

== Background ==
Leading into the 2005 council election, the Liberal Democrats and its predecessors had been in power on the island since 1981, albeit since 2001 in coalition with a group of independents. However, public opposition to a school closure program by the council led to the rout of the Liberal Democrats, and the election of the Conservatives to take over. Education remained a major issue as the Conservatives under Council Leader David Pugh sought re-election in 2009, with plans to redress problems caused by the island's unusual three-tier education structure having elicited further controversy – and the resignation of several Conservative councillors in protest – and a sluggish economy with unemployment higher than the average of South East England playing against the party as well. In the end, the Conservatives won re-election, but held only 24 seats, a drop of 9 since the last election, although a boundary review had led to the abolition of 8 seats. Behind them, independents made up the next largest contingent on the council, winning 10 seats, whilst the Liberal Democrats failed to make headway.

== Campaign ==
As the 2013 campaign started, education remained a top issue. Though the three-tier system had been abolished in favour of two tiers, three of the island's six secondary schools were judged 'inadequate' by Ofsted. Simon Perry, editor of OnTheWight, remarked to the BBC that education was the single biggest priority for voters. In addition, the council agreed to transfer some of its education powers to Hampshire County Council, despite not being under its jurisdiction; and problems over education were further amplified for the Conservatives when the chief executive of the council, Steve Benyon, departed controversially after the Ofsted inspections. Beyond this local issue was the impact of national politics: the Conservatives were into their third year of governing the United Kingdom in coalition with the Liberal Democrats, implementing unpopular austerity measures and fending off challenges from Labour on the left and UKIP on the right. Cuts to local government forced the council to implement their own cost-saving measures, which included closing public toilets and tourist information centres.

The Conservatives campaigned on working with the private sector to improve the local economy, and minimising future council tax rises. The Island Independents – a group of mutually-supporting candidates and councillors standing as independents – pledged to create a more transparent administration that worked more with islanders on decision-making. Their campaign was launched by former independent MP Martin Bell. Labour focused its campaign on improving facilities for disabled people, including trying to repair the council's relationship with the disabled-orientated Riverside Centre, and working to prevent schools on the island from becoming academies; the Liberal Democrats, meanwhile, promised to invest more into children's services and to start an affordable housing program. UKIP, trying to enter the council for the first time, pledged to re-open public toilets and tourist information centres, campaign for a grammar school, protect the Frank James Hospital, and allow their councillors to vote without a party whip.

The election in the Shanklin South ward, held by Pugh, soon became the most high-profile battle of the campaign. Facing Pugh was Richard Priest, manager of the Riverside Centre and a town councillor, standing as an Island Independent. Fearful of splitting the anti-Pugh vote and sensing Priest had the best chance of defeating Pugh, Labour and UKIP decided not to field candidates in the ward. Meanwhile, the continuing decline of the Liberal Democrats on the island became more evident during the campaign. Aside from their local problems since their last stint in power, the national party had been battered by its involvement in government with the Conservatives. Bob Blezzard, a high-profile Liberal Democrat on the island, resigned from the party in 2012 and publicly denounced his national party leader, Nick Clegg, before announcing he would stand as an independent candidate to the council for Sandown North. Former council leader, Shirley Smart, likewise decided to resign from the party and stand as an independent in Newport South. Neither aligned themselves with the Island Independents. In the end, the Liberal Democrats were only able to field seven candidates, with group leader Reg Barry saying it was a 'shame' that Blezzard and Smart, among others, 'have turned their back'. The UKIP campaign ran into some difficulty when they were accused by the Conservatives of falsifying signatures on the electoral nomination forms of their candidate for Newport North – the police were unable to give judgement on the complaint before the election.

== Results ==
With all ward results declared on the day after the election, the Conservatives had lost their majority on the council. After winning 24 seats in 2009, with a majority of 4, the party ended up with 15 seats, 6 short of overall control – a net loss of 9 seats. The Island Independents, on the other hand, won 15 seats as well. UKIP gained representation on the council for the first time, winning 2 seats, whilst Labour reclaimed Lake North, lost in 2009. The Liberal Democrats achieved their worst result on the island since the party's formation, holding onto only Reg Barry's seat. Blezzard and Smart, however, were elected as independents, as were another three candidates who were also not aligned with the Island Independents. The most notable result though, was Pugh's defeat to Priest by only 10 votes. Without a seat on the council, Pugh lost its leadership, and that of the Conservative group – on 7 May, Cllr Dave Stewart was chosen to replace Pugh as leader of the group. After his election defeat, Pugh remarked 'Clearly I'm disappointed. It's been a privilege to serve the island.'

With neither the Conservatives or the Island Independents winning a majority outright, both sides vied to win the support of other councillors to form their own administration. On 8 May, the Island Independents announced that the five other independents had joined their group. The next election to the council was held in May 2017 and led to the Conservatives regaining control of the council.

Arreton and Newchurch
Party	Candidate	Votes	%	±%
Island Independents	Colin Richards	529	41.04	
Conservative	Erica Oulton	458	35.53	
UKIP	Ian Sherfield	299	23.20	
Majority		71	5.52	
Turnout		1289	41.99	
Island Independents gain from Liberal Democrats		Swing		

Binstead and Fishbourne
Party	Candidate	Votes	%	±%
Island Independents	Ivor Warlow	559	48.19	
Conservative	Sylvia Sillar	315	27.16	
UKIP	Alan Darnell	225	19.40	
Labour	Katie Curtis	61	5.26	
Majority		244	21.03	
Turnout		1160	41.94	
Island Independents gain from Conservative		Swing		

Brading, St Helens and Bembridge (2 seats)
Party	Candidate	Votes	%	±%
Island Independents	Jonathan Bacon	1308	51.31	
Island Independents	Gordon Kendall	1121	43.98	
Conservative	Geoff Giles	732	28.72	
UKIP	Mike Tarrant	741	29.07	
Conservative	Mary Collis	607	23.81	
Labour	Peter Coleman	131	5.14	
Majority		576	12.41	
Majority		380	8.19	
Turnout		2549	41.19	
Island Independents gain from Independent		Swing		
Island Independents gain from Independent		Swing		

Carisbrooke
Party	Candidate	Votes	%	±%
Conservative	John Hobart	431	48.65	
Island Independents	Mike Powell	380	42.89	
Labour	Nick Wray	72	8.13	
Majority		71	5.52	
Turnout		51	5.78	
Conservative hold		Swing		

Central Wight
Party	Candidate	Votes	%	±%
Conservative	Bob Seely	700	51.93	
UKIP	Sally Turner	342	25.37	
Green	Bob Keats	297	22.03	
Majority		358	26.74	
Turnout		1348	46.42	
Conservative hold		Swing		

Chale, Niton & Whitwell
Party	Candidate	Votes	%	±%
Conservative	Dave Stewart	658	60.70	
UKIP	Jai Nolan	256	23.62	
Labour	Simon Haytack	168	15.50	
Majority		402	37.15	
Turnout		1084	47.19	
Conservative hold		Swing		

Cowes Medina
Party	Candidate	Votes	%	±%
Independent	Lora Peacey-Wilcox	605	70.35	
Conservative	David Walters	158	18.37	
Labour	Margaret Bryan	97	11.28	
Majority		447	51.98	
Turnout		860	27.63	
Independent gain from Conservative		Swing		

Cowes North
Party	Candidate	Votes	%	±%
Conservative	Paul Bertie	416	51.36	
UKIP	Rose Lynden-Bell	340	41.98	
Majority		76	10.05	
Turnout		810	31.12	
Conservative hold		Swing		

Cowes South & Northwood
Party	Candidate	Votes	%	±%
Conservative	John Nicholson	518	50.44	
Island Independents	Jude Ferris	502	48.88	
Majority		16	1.57	
Turnout		1027	34.34	
Conservative hold		Swing		

Cowes West & Gurnard
Party	Candidate	Votes	%	±%
Independent	Paul Fuller	1143	81.94	
Conservative	Mark McNeill	247	17.71	
Majority		896	64.46	
Turnout		1395	45.93	
Independent hold		Swing		

East Cowes
Party	Candidate	Votes	%	±%
Island Independents	Luisa Hillard	367	30.66	
Conservative	Margaret Webster	364	30.41	
UKIP	Daniel Moss	323	26.98	
Liberal Democrats	Bob Packham	137	11.45	
Majority		3	0.25	
Turnout		1197	39.39	
Island Independents gain from Conservative		Swing		

Freshwater North
Party	Candidate	Votes	%	±%
Conservative	David Eccles	402	53.89	
UKIP	Michael Jennings	313	41.96	
Majority		89	12.45	
Turnout		746	31.76	
Conservative hold		Swing		

Freshwater South
Party	Candidate	Votes	%	±%
Independent	John Medland	480	48.88	
Conservative	George Cameron	320	32.59	
UKIP	Paul Taylor	179	18.23	
Majority		160	16.34	
Turnout		982	39.84	
Independent gain from Conservative		Swing		

Godshill and Wroxall
Party	Candidate	Votes	%	±%
Island Independents	Rodney Downer	773	68.96	
UKIP	Paul St John Martin	191	17.04	
Conservative	Nick John	112	9.99	
Labour	Jane McKean	45	4.01	
Majority		582	51.92	
Turnout		1121	43.40	
Island Independents gain from Independent		Swing		

Havenstreet, Ashey and Haylands
Party	Candidate	Votes	%	±%
Conservative	Conrad Gauntlett	287	33.26	
Island Independents	Vanessa Churchman	249	28.85	
UKIP	Kim Joyce	194	22.48	
Liberal Democrats	Malcolm Ross	129	14.95	
Majority		38	4.42	
Turnout		863	30.70	
Conservative gain from Independent		Swing		

Lake North
Party	Candidate	Votes	%	±%
Labour	Alan Hollands	355	41.09	
Conservative	Gerry White	271	31.37	
UKIP	Emerson Maguire	234	27.08	
Majority		84	9.77	
Turnout		864	30.48	
Labour gain from Conservative		Swing		

Lake South
Party	Candidate	Votes	%	±%
Conservative	Ray Bloomfield	381	38.25	
UKIP	Hugh Dinsdale	331	33.23	
Independent	Geoff Clynch	277	27.81	
Majority		50	5.06	
Turnout		996	33.71	
Conservative hold		Swing		

Nettlestone and Seaview
Party	Candidate	Votes	%	±%
Liberal Democrats	Reg Barry	830	60.67	
Conservative	Diana Tuson	389	28.44	
UKIP	Philip Letwin	149	10.89	
Majority		441	32.24	
Turnout		1368	53.63	
Liberal Democrats hold		Swing		

Newport Central
Party	Candidate	Votes	%	±%
Conservative	Julie Jones-Evans	375	47.41	
Labour	Adrian Nicholas	140	17.70	
Island Independents	Verity Bird	138	17.45	
UKIP	Thomas Soutar	133	16.81	
Majority		235	29.90	
Turnout		791	25.93	
Conservative hold		Swing		

Newport East
Party	Candidate	Votes	%	±%
Labour	Geoff Lumley	443	60.44	
UKIP	Richard Leppard	161	21.96	
Conservative	Bill Wyatt-Millington	126	17.19	
Majority		282	38.63	
Turnout		733	28.67	
Labour hold		Swing		

Newport North
Party	Candidate	Votes	%	±%
Conservative	Matthew Price	356	42.79	
Labour	Mary Craven	173	20.79	
UKIP	Richard Wilkins	168	20.19	
Island Independents	John Luckett	126	15.14	
Majority		183	22.24	
Turnout		832	33.62	
Conservative hold		Swing		

Newport South
Party	Candidate	Votes	%	±%
Independent	Shirley Smart	365	51.19	
Conservative	Roger Dixcey	336	47.12	
Majority		29	4.14	
Turnout		713	51.19	
Independent gain from Conservative		Swing		

Newport West
Party	Candidate	Votes	%	±%
Conservative	Chris Whitehouse	295	43.57	
Independent	David Whittaker	184	27.18	
UKIP	Neville Westlake	179	26.44	
Majority		111	16.87	
Turnout		667	28.02	
Conservative hold		Swing		

Parkhurst
Party	Candidate	Votes	%	±%
Conservative	Richard Hollis	248	36.58	
Liberal Democrats	Andrew Garratt	229	33.78	
UKIP	Barbara Port	153	22.57	
Island Independents	Andrew Gryffe	44	6.49	
Majority		19	2.82	
Turnout		678	28.13	
Conservative hold		Swing		

Ryde East
Party	Candidate	Votes	%	±%
Independent	Roger Whitby-Smith	377	38.39	
Liberal Democrats	Dave Knowles	348	35.44	
Conservative	Gary Taylor	249	25.36	
Majority		29	2.98	
Turnout		982	33.09	
Independent gain from Liberal Democrats		Swing		

Ryde North East
Party	Candidate	Votes	%	±%
Conservative	Wayne Whittle	324	39.66	
Island Independents	Vince Valvona	191	23.38	
Labour	Mick Lyons	141	17.26	
UKIP	Cole Green	137	16.77	
TUSC	Nancy Farrell	23	2.82	
Majority		133	16.30	
Turnout		817	28.46	
Conservative gain from Independent		Swing		

Ryde North West
Party	Candidate	Votes	%	±%
Island Independents	Phil Jordan	390	45.67	
Conservative	Arthur Taylor	295	34.54	
UKIP	John Lovell	165	19.32	
Majority		95	11.18	
Turnout		854	28.41	
Island Independents gain from Conservative		Swing		

Ryde South
Party	Candidate	Votes	%	±%
Island Independents	Charles Chapman	256	34.22	
Labour	Deb Gardiner	168	22.46	
UKIP	Tony Zeid	161	21.52	
Conservative	Roi Milburn	109	14.57	
Independent	Robin Allen	51	6.82	
Majority		88	11.81	
Majority		748	23.54	
Turnout		2549	41.19	
Island Independents gain from Liberal Democrats		Swing		

Ryde West
Party	Candidate	Votes	%	±%
Island Independents	Ian Stephens	533	63.38	
Conservative	Philip Warren	151	17.95	
Labour	Sue Lyons	75	8.92	
Liberal Democrats	John Timmons	75	8.92	
Majority		382	45.80	
Turnout		841	29.22	
Island Independents gain from Independent		Swing		

Sandown North
Party	Candidate	Votes	%	±%
Independent	Bob Blezzard	330	36.22	
Conservative	Raj Patel	195	21.41	
UKIP	John Wyatt	161	17.67	
Independent	Chris Dupre	99	10.87	
Majority		135	14.88	
Turnout		911	36.24	
Independent gain from Independent		Swing		

Sandown South
Party	Candidate	Votes	%	±%
Conservative	Ian Ward	389	48.02	
UKIP	Linda Pitcher	182	22.47	
Independent	Cathy Wright	174	21.48	
Labour	Eric Goacher	63	7.78	
Majority		207	25.62	
Turnout		810	26.49	
Conservative hold		Swing		

Shanklin Central
Party	Candidate	Votes	%	±%
Island Independents	Jon Gilbey	528	50.67	
Conservative	David Williams	432	41.46	
Labour	Doreen Armstrong	81	7.77	
Majority		96	9.22	
Turnout		1042	35.73	
Island Independents gain from Conservative		Swing		

Shanklin South
Party	Candidate	Votes	%	±%
Island Independents	Richard Priest	629	49.84	
Conservative	David Pugh	619	49.05	
Majority		10	0.80	
Turnout		1262	42.31	
Island Independents gain from Conservative		Swing		

Totland
Party	Candidate	Votes	%	±%
Island Independents	John Howe	420	42.77	
Conservative	Carol Bryan	303	30.86	
UKIP	Iain McKie	254	25.87	
Majority		117	11.98	
Turnout		982	39.28	
Island Independents gain from Liberal Democrats		Swing		

Ventnor East
Party	Candidate	Votes	%	±%
UKIP	Graham Perks	412	40.31	
Island Independents	Chris Welsford	336	32.88	
Conservative	Tony Marvin	168	16.44	
Labour	Ed Gouge	106	10.37	
Majority		76	7.44	
Turnout		982	39.28	
UKIP gain from Independent		Swing		

Ventnor West
Party	Candidate	Votes	%	±%
Island Independents	Steve Stubbings	395	34.53	
Conservative	Susan Scoccia	376	32.87	
UKIP	Ken Rivers	208	18.18	
Labour	Stewart Blackmore	161	14.07	
Majority		19	1.67	
Turnout		1144	45.06	
Island Independents gain from Conservative		Swing		

West Wight
Party	Candidate	Votes	%	±%
Conservative	Stuart Hutchinson	494	46.43	
UKIP	Tina George	271	25.47	
Island Independents	Thomas Rowley	223	20.96	
Labour	Laraine Pascoe	74	6.95	
Majority		223	21.00	
Turnout		1064	37.18	
Conservative gain from Independent		Swing		

Whippingham and Osborne
Party	Candidate	Votes	%	±%
Island Independents	Julia Hill	646	61.35	
Conservative	Stephen Hendry	398	37.80	
Majority		248	23.75	
Turnout		1053	31.62	
Island Independents gain from Conservative		Swing		

Wootton Bridge
Party	Candidate	Votes	%	±%
UKIP	Daryll Pitcher	608	49.88	
Conservative	Edward Giles	413	33.47	
Liberal Democrats	Henry Adams	100	8.20	
Island Independents	Peter Whiteman	98	8.04	
Majority		200	16.47	
Turnout		1219	42.64	
UKIP gain from Conservative		Swing		
