= 2017 Isle of Wight Council election =

2017 English local government election

← 2013	4 May 2017	2021 →

All 40 seats to the Isle of Wight Council 21 seats needed for a majority
- Turnout: 40.92%

	First party	Second party	Third party
Party	Conservative	Independent	Liberal Democrats
Last election	15 seats, 34.7%	20 seats, 35.7%	1 seat, 4.5%
Seats won	25	11	2
Seat change	▲10	▼9	▲1
Popular vote	18,377	12,508	2,775
Percentage	41.3%	28.2%	6.2%
Swing	▲6.6%	▼7.5%	▲1.8%
	Fourth party	Fifth party
Party	Green	Labour
Last election	0 seats, 0.7%	2 seats, 6.4%
Seats won	1	1
Seat change	▲1	▼1
Popular vote	5,597	4,308
Percentage	12.6%	9.7%
Swing	▲11.9%	▲3.3%

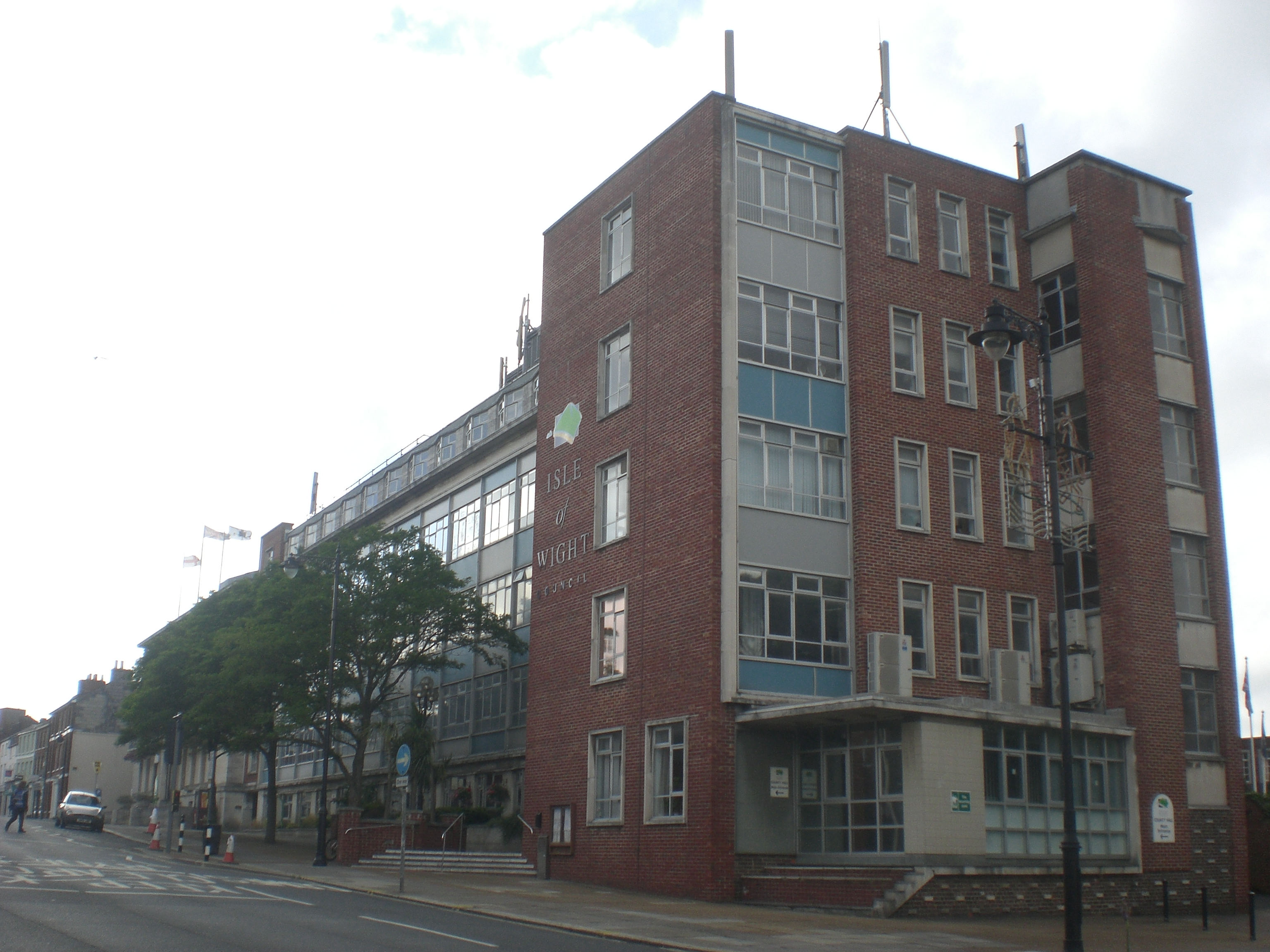
Isle of Wight County Hall, in Newport, Isle of Wight.

The 2017 Isle of Wight Council election took place on 4 May 2017 as part of the 2017 local elections in the United Kingdom. All 40 Councillors were elected from 39 electoral divisions, which each returned either one or two Councillors by first-past-the-post voting for a four-year term of office.

The result of the election saw the Isle of Wight Conservatives re-take majority control of the Isle of Wight Council after electing 25 Councillors. The Island Independents, who after the previous election had formed the ruling group dropped to nine. Elsewhere, the Liberal Democrats had a net gain of one, whilst Labour had a net loss of one. The results also saw the Green Party gain its first Isle of Wight Councillor, whilst UKIP lost both of its two Councillors.

== Results summary ==
Isle of Wight Council election, 2017
Party	Seats	Gains	Losses	Net gain/loss	Seats %	Votes %	Votes	+/−
Conservative	25			+10	62.5	41.3	18,377	+6.6
Independent	11			-9	27.5	28.2	9,638	-7.5
Green	1			+1	2.5	12.6	5,597	+11.9
Labour	1			-1	2.5	9.7	4,308	+3.3
Liberal Democrats	2			+1	5.0	6.2	2,775	+1.8
UKIP	0			-2	—	2.0	867	-16.0

== Ward results ==
All wards elect one Councillor (unless otherwise stated) to the Isle of Wight Council by the First past the post system of voting. The total number of votes and turnout in each ward includes spoilt ballot papers.

Arreton and Newchurch
Party	Candidate	Votes	%	±%
Conservative	Claire Mosdell	733	56.17	+20.64
Independent	Ali Hayden	222	17.01	–
Labour	Iain MacLennan	169	12.95	–
Green	Joshua Pointing	119	9.12	–
Liberal Democrats	Sandy Belfitt	58	4.44	–
Majority		551	39.28	
Turnout		1305	43.06	+1.07
Conservative gain from Island Independents		Swing		

Binstead and Fishbourne
Party	Candidate	Votes	%	±%
Conservative	John Kilpatrick	390	35.07	+7.91
Island Independents	Ivor Warlow	388	34.89	−13.30
Green	Jacqueline Cook	152	13.67	–
Labour	John Glazebrook	88	7.91	+2.85
Liberal Democrats	Christopher Cory	62	5.58	–
UKIP	Linda Pitcher	32	2.88	−16.52
Majority		2	0.18	
Turnout		1112	41.80	
Conservative gain from Island Independents		Swing		

Brading, St Helens and Bembridge (2 seats)
Party	Candidate	Votes	%	±%
Conservative	Brian Tyndall	1,194	23.58	
Conservative	Michael Murwill	1,115	22.02	
Island Independents	Jonathon Bacon	996	19.67	
Island Independents	Gordon Kendall	870	17.18	
Green	Roger Bartrum	351	6.93	
Liberal Democrats	John Graney	271	4.52	
Labour	Hugh Street	251	4.18	
Majority		198	3.92	
Majority		245	4.85	
Turnout		5063	42.21	
Conservative gain from Island Independents		Swing		
Conservative gain from Island Independents		Swing		

Carisbrooke
Party	Candidate	Votes	%	±%
Conservative	John Hobart	595	57.05	+8.40
Green	Imogen May	339	32.50	–
Independent	Liam Verstraeten	97	9.30	–
Majority		256	24.38	
Turnout		1043	39.89	
Conservative hold		Swing		

Central Wight
Party	Candidate	Votes	%	±%
Conservative	Bob Seely	1,026	75.11	+23.18
Green	Andrew Langan	258	18.89	−3.14
Labour	Jane McKean	81	5.93	–
Majority		768	56.26	
Turnout		1366	47.73	
Conservative hold		Swing		

Chale, Niton and Whitwell
Party	Candidate	Votes	%	±%
Conservative	David Stewart	791	66.64	+5.94
Green	Claire Critchison	313	26.37	–
Labour	Wendy Loader	80	6.74	−8.76
Majority		478	40.37	
Turnout		1187	51.08	
Conservative hold		Swing		

Cowes Medina
Party	Candidate	Votes	%	±%
Independent	Lora Peacey-Wilcox	528	57.33	−12.75
Green	Neil Oliver	167	18.13	–
Conservative	David Walters	128	13.90	−4.28
Labour	Ben Haldenby	95	10.31	−0.85
Majority		361	39.32	
Turnout		921	30.86	
Independent hold		Swing		

Cowes North
Party	Candidate	Votes	%	±%
Conservative	Paul Bertie	389	42.65	−8.71
Green	Jean Bartrum	246	26.97	–
Liberal Democrats	Anni Adams	227	24.89	–
UKIP	Rose Lyndon-Bell	47	5.15	−36.83
Majority		143	15.73	
Turnout		912	36.79	
Conservative hold		Swing		

Cowes South and Northwood
Party	Candidate	Votes	%	±%
Conservative	John Nicholson	658	56.97	+6.53
Green	Laurie Tennant	257	23.07	–
Labour	Will Bossman	238	20.61	–
Majority		401	34.78	
Turnout		1155	40.50	+6.16
Conservative hold		Swing		

Cowes West and Gurnard
Party	Candidate	Votes	%	±%
Independent	Paul Fuller	1,145	75.58	−6.36
Conservative	Christopher Preston	293	19.34	+1.63
Labour	Cheryl Lovelace	75	4.95	–
Majority		852	56.31	−8.15
Turnout		1515	48.50	+2.57
Independent hold		Swing		

East Cowes
Party	Candidate	Votes	%	±%
Independent	Karl Love	620	47.29	–
Island Independents	Luisa Hillard	336	25.63	−5.03
Conservative	Michael Collis	199	15.18	−15.23
Liberal Democrats	Bob Packham	154	11.75	+0.30
Majority		284	21.70	
Turnout		1311	42.24	+2.85
Independent gain from Island Independents		Swing		

Freshwater North
Party	Candidate	Votes	%	±%
Conservative	George Cameron	453	55.24	+1.35
Green	Daniel James	361	44.02	–
Majority		92	11.30	−1.15
Turnout		820	37.29	+5.53
Conservative hold		Swing		

Freshwater South
Party	Candidate	Votes	%	±%
Independent	John Medland	520	50.10	+1.22
Conservative	Gareth Wyre	291	28.03	−4.56
Liberal Democrats	Nick Stuart	93	8.96	–
Labour	Matthew Wolfe	73	7.03	–
UKIP	Terry Brennan	59	5.68	−12.55
Majority		229	22.10	+5.76
Turnout		1038	40.75	+0.91
Independent hold		Swing		

Godshill and Wroxall
Party	Candidate	Votes	%	±%
Island Independents	Rodney Downer	1,006	82.46	
Conservative	Ewan Smith-Wainwright	127	10.41	
Green	Patch Barry	85	6.97	
Majority		879	72.17	
Turnout		1,220	47.20	
Island Independents hold		Swing		

Havenstreet, Ashey & Haylands
Party	Candidate	Votes	%	±%
Conservative	Vanessa Churchman	338	36.62	
Independent	Sandy Stephens	197	21.34	
Green	David Logan	173	18.74	
Liberal Democrats	Malcolm Ross	113	12.24	
Labour	Sue Lyons	100	10.83	
Majority		141	15.31	
Turnout		923	32.60	
Conservative hold		Swing		

Lake North
Party	Candidate	Votes	%	±%
Conservative	Tig Outlaw	462	42.82	
Liberal Democrats	Bob Blezzard	266	24.65	
Labour	Deborah Gardiner	222	20.57	
UKIP	Gerry White	119	11.03	
Majority		196	18.33	
Turnout		1,079	37.66	
Conservative gain from Labour		Swing		

Lake South
Party	Candidate	Votes	%	±%
Conservative	Paul Brading	549	48.84	
Labour	Stewart Blackmore	183	16.28	
Independent	John Flemming	172	15.30	
Independent	Adrian Whittaker	159	14.15	
Liberal Democrats	Chani-May Courtney	53	4.72	
Majority		366	32.80	
Turnout		1,124	38.63	
Conservative hold		Swing		

Nettlestone & Seaview
Party	Candidate	Votes	%	±%
Liberal Democrats	Reg Barry	613	48.31	
Conservative	Michael Ward	461	36.33	
Independent	Mark Gibbs	120	9.46	
Green	Mark Gaskin	37	2.92	
Labour	Mark Rees	35	2.76	
Majority		152	12.01	
Turnout		1,269	51.61	
Liberal Democrats hold		Swing		

Newport Central
Party	Candidate	Votes	%	±%
Independent	Julie Jones-Evans	488	58.87	
Conservative	Steve Hastings	192	23.16	
Labour	Robin Price	139	16.77	
Majority		296	36.14	
Turnout		2,917	28.42	
Independent gain from Conservative		Swing		

Newport East
Party	Candidate	Votes	%	±%
Labour	Geoff Lumley	587	70.81	
Conservative	Bev Hastings	181	21.83	
UKIP	Rod Mosnicka	56	6.76	
Majority		406	49.27	
Turnout		829	29.67	
Labour hold		Swing		

Newport North
Party	Candidate	Votes	%	±%
Conservative	Matthew Price	548	62.27	
Green	Rebecca Blachford	167	18.98	
Labour	Mary Craven	164	18.64	
Majority		381	43.34	
Turnout		880	35.70	
Conservative hold		Swing		

Newport South
Party	Candidate	Votes	%	±%
Independent	Shirley Smart	435	49.83	
Conservative	Rachel Brown	431	49.37	
Majority		4	0.46	
Turnout		873	32.44	
Independent hold		Swing		

Newport West
Party	Candidate	Votes	%	±%
Conservative	Chris Whitehouse	350	40.09	
Green	Jaimie Bundell	180	20.62	
Independent	Peter Whiteman	166	19.01	
Independent	Wendy Cook	90	10.31	
Labour	Laraine Pascoe	53	6.07	
Liberal Democrats	Wendy Moth	31	3.55	
Majority		170	19.54	
Turnout		873	35.14	
Conservative hold		Swing		

Parkhurst
Party	Candidate	Votes	%	±%
Liberal Democrats	Andrew Garratt	404	53.51	
Conservative	Richard Hollis	272	36.03	
Labour	Simon Haytack	78	10.33	
Majority		132	17.51	
Turnout		755	32.02	
Liberal Democrats gain from Conservative		Swing		

Ryde East
Party	Candidate	Votes	%	±%
Green	Michael Lilley	489	52.26	
Conservative	Mary Collis	282	35.02	
Independent	Roger Whitby-Smith	202	17.92	
Liberal Democrats	Lawrence Fontana	37	3.28	
Majority		307	27.66	
Turnout		1,127	39.89	
Green gain from Independent		Swing		

Ryde North East
Party	Candidate	Votes	%	±%
Conservative	Wayne Whittle	472	50.97	
Green	Nancy Farrell	270	39.16	
Labour	Zarah Groves	172	18.57	
Majority		202	22.10	
Turnout		926	35.56	
Conservative hold		Swing		

Ryde North West
Party	Candidate	Votes	%	±%
Conservative	Adrian Axford	444	45.35	
Island Independents	Phil Jordan	178	18.18	
Labour	Julian Critchley	154	15.73	
Green	Ewald Widiner	138	14.10	
Liberal Democrats	Stephen Courtney	64	6.54	
Majority		266	27.20	
Turnout		976	35.25	
Conservative gain from Island Independents		Swing		

Ryde South
Party	Candidate	Votes	%	±%
Conservative	Charles Chapman	279	35.27	
Labour	Mick Lyons	262	33.12	
Independent	Karen Lucioni	241	30.47	
Majority		17	2.17	
Turnout		791	26.53	
Conservative gain from Island Independents		Swing		

Ryde West
Party	Candidate	Votes	%	±%
Island Independents	Ian Stephens	274	29.62	
Conservative	Conrad Gauntlett	210	22.70	
Labour	Jim Moody	174	18.81	
Green	Alex Pointing	135	14.59	
Liberal Democrats	Janet Beckett	130	14.05	
Majority		64	6.93	
Turnout		925	33.80	
Independent hold		Swing		

Sandown North
Party	Candidate	Votes	%	±%
Independent	Debbie Andre	382	44.01	
Conservative	Rajesh Patel	255	29.38	
Labour	Ronald Anderson	138	15.90	
UKIP	Kevin Arlette	88	10.14	
Majority		127	14.72	
Turnout		868	36.87	
Independent gain from Independent		Swing		

Sandown South
Party	Candidate	Votes	%	±%
Conservative	Ian Ward	569	59.02	
Green	Eric Lawson	392	40.66	
Majority		177	18.42	
Turnout		964	32.80	
Conservative hold		Swing		

Shanklin Central
Party	Candidate	Votes	%	±%
Conservative	Michael Beston	457	40.12	
Island Independents	Jon Gilbey	451	39.60	
Green	Robert May	146	12.82	
Labour	Elizabeth Evans	85	7.46	
Majority		6	0.53	
Turnout		1,139	40.36	
Conservative gain from Island Independents		Swing		

Shanklin South
Party	Candidate	Votes	%	±%
Conservative	Chris Quirk	481	38.88	
Island Independents	Richard Priest	426	34.44	
Independent	Andrew Green	106	8.57	
Green	Lorraine Briar	70	5.66	
Labour	Doreen Armstrong	54	4.37	
UKIP	Sonja Ward	53	4.28	
Liberal Democrats	Nick Belfitt	42	3.40	
Majority		55	4.46	
Turnout		1,237	42.33	
Conservative gain from Independent		Swing		

Totland
Party	Candidate	Votes	%	±%
Island Independents	John Howe	467	45.56	
Conservative	Carol Bryan	428	41.76	
Independent	Iain McKie	120	11.71	
Majority		39	3.84	
Turnout		1,025	42.96	
Island Independents hold		Swing		

Ventnor East
Party	Candidate	Votes	%	±%
Conservative	Graham Perks	450	49.94	
Green	Jonathan Marks	184	20.42	
Labour	Ed Gouge	150	16.65	
Independent	Billy Hill	80	8.88	
UKIP	Stephen Gibbons-Roscoe	32	3.55	
Majority		226	29.69	
Turnout		901	38.11	
Conservative gain from UKIP		Swing		

Ventnor West
Party	Candidate	Votes	%	±%
Conservative	Gary Peace	455	45.27	
Green	Stephen Cockett	282	28.06	
Independent	Harry Rees	110	10.95	
Labour	Steve Cooper	94	9.35	
UKIP	Richard Curtis	63	6.27	
Majority		173	17.23	
Turnout		1,005	42.33	
Conservative gain from Island Independents		Swing		

West Wight
Party	Candidate	Votes	%	±%
Conservative	Stuart Hutchinson	687	70.03	
Green	Petar Marinov	186	18.96	
Labour	Mary Gouge	103	10.50	
Majority		501	51.33	
Turnout		981	36.05	
Conservative hold		Swing		

Whippingham and Osborne
Party	Candidate	Votes	%	±%
Independent	Julia Baker-Smith	692	56.72	
Conservative	Simon Walker	313	25.66	
Labour	Lorna Trollope	146	11.97	
Liberal Democrats	Patricia Packham	62	5.08	
Majority		379	31.24	
Turnout		1,220	36.49	
Independent hold		Swing		

Wootton Bridge
Party	Candidate	Votes	%	±%
Conservative	Barry Abraham	429	37.66	
UKIP	Daryll Pitcher	318	27.92	
Independent	Becky Roncoroni	224	19.67	
Liberal Democrats	Sue Cory	95	8.34	
Labour	William Chase	65	5.71	
Majority		111	9.81	
Turnout		1,139	40.99	
Conservative gain from UKIP		Swing		
