= Island Independents =

- Leader: Debbie Andre
- Founder: Ian Stephens
- Founded: 2013
- Headquarters: Penthouse, The Appley, Appley Rise, Ryde, Isle of Wight

Website
- islandindependents.org.uk

The Island Independents were a political group who stood as mutually-supporting independent candidates on the Isle of Wight in the United Kingdom for the 2013 Isle of Wight Council election. The group won 15 of the 40 seats, emerging as the joint-largest group on the council, but without an overall majority. The group leader is Councillor Ian Stephens.

In the 2017 local elections the group had 22 candidates standing and became the largest group in opposition with 11 councillors.

In the 2021 local elections, Ian Stephens led a new Island Independent Network group.

== Officers ==
- Vice chairman of the council, Cllr Shirley Smart
- Chairman, Phil Jordan
- Area Co-ordinator, Karen Lucioni
- Founder, Ian Stephens
- Treasurer, Peter Whiteman
- County Hall Leader, Debbie Andre
