= 2009 Isle of Wight Council election =

2009 UK local government election

2009 local election results on the Isle of Wight

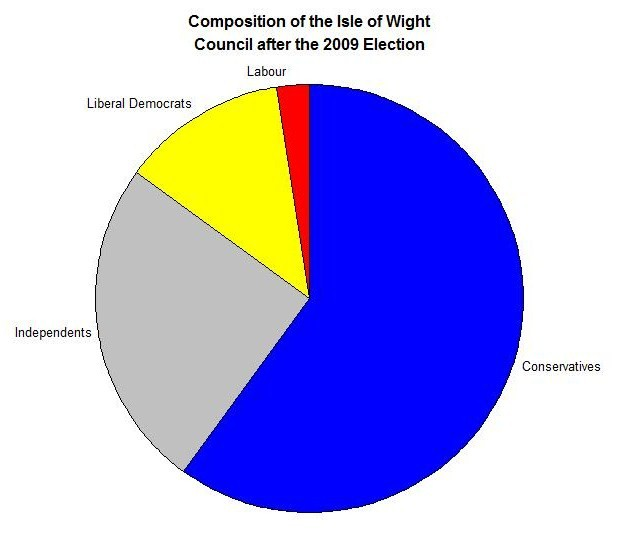
The composition of the Isle of Wight Council after the 2009 election.

The 2009 Isle of Wight Council elections were held on Thursday 4 June 2009.

After a review by the Local Government Boundary Commission for England, the number of seats on the council was reduced from 48 single-member wards, to a 40-member council, consisting of 38 single member wards, and one double-member ward.

== Overview ==
The result of the election was 'no change', with the Conservatives retaining an overall majority by winning twenty-four of the forty seats available. Of the sixteen remaining seats, ten went to independents, five to the Liberal Democrats and just one to the Labour Party. Although the Conservatives managed to retain control, the Isle of Wight was still the only council in England in which they lost seats. Among the factors which could have led to this relatively poor performance are the recent education reforms on the Isle of Wight, which led to protests over the closure of island primary schools. The "Standards not Tiers" independent candidate Chris Welsford beat the sitting Conservative councillor Jonny Fitzgerald-Bond by 141 votes in the Ventnor East ward. In the Cowes West and Gurnard ward, which was at the heart of education reforms, sitting Tory councillor Alan Wells was beaten by independent candidate Paul Fuller. The large numbers of independent candidates standing at this election and the increased level of support for them could also be attributed to the ongoing United Kingdom Parliamentary expenses scandal, pushing voters away from the mainstream political parties represented in the House of Commons.

== Results ==
The party standings following the election:

Party	2005 Cllrs	2005 Cllrs, restated	Gain/Loss	2009 Cllrs
Conservative Party	35	29	−5	24
Independents	5	4	+3	7
Liberal Democrats	5	4	+1	5
Labour Party	2	2	−1	1
Others	1	1	+2	3
Total	48	40	–	40

== Ward results ==
The following are results from each electoral ward.

Arreton and Newchurch
Party	Candidate	Votes	%	±%
Liberal Democrats	Colin Richards	691	51.68	
Conservative	Erica Oulton	646	48.31	
Turnout		1337	44.62	

Binstead and Fishbourne
Party	Candidate	Votes	%	±%
Conservative	Ivan Bulwe	519	42.47	
Independent	Ivor Warlow	515	42.14	
Liberal Democrats	Tony Zeid	188	15.38	
Turnout		1222	45.17	

Brading, St Helens and Bembridge (two seats)
Party	Candidate	Votes	%	±%
Independent	Patrick Joyce	1444		
Independent	Jonathan Bacon	1289		
Conservative	Sally Pigot	1117		
Conservative	Joe Robertson	1097		
Liberal Democrats	Anouska Blake	406		
Liberal Democrats	David Cleaver	338		
Turnout		4391	48.49	

Carisbrooke
Party	Candidate	Votes	%	±%
Conservative	John Hobart	583		
Independent	Barbara Foster	475		
Turnout		1058	41.27	

Central Wight
Party	Candidate	Votes	%	±%
Conservative	Peter Bingham	894		
Liberal Democrats	Jill Wareham	732		
Turnout		1626	57.98	

Chale, Niton and Whitwell
Party	Candidate	Votes	%	±%
Conservative	William Wyatt-Millington	641		
Liberal Democrats	Malcolm Groves	404		
Turnout		1045	45.27	

Cowes Medina
Party	Candidate	Votes	%	±%
Conservative	Lora Peacy-Wilcox	617		
Liberal Democrats	Hugh Reid	148		
Labour	Steve Cooper	121		
Turnout		886	30.74	

Cowes North
Party	Candidate	Votes	%	±%
Conservative	George Brown	542		
Independent	Wendy Wardrop	276		
Labour	Peter Laugharne	98		
Turnout		916	35.27	

Cowes South and Northwood
Party	Candidate	Votes	%	±%
Conservative	Roger Mazillius	987		
Liberal Democrats	Charlotte Witheridge	230		
Labour	Nicholas Wray	85		
Turnout		1302	45.53	

Cowes West and Gurnard
Party	Candidate	Votes	%	±%
Independent	Paul Fuller	819		
Conservative	Alan Wells	649		
Turnout		1468	47.99	

East Cowes
Party	Candidate	Votes	%	±%
Conservative	Margaret Webster	642		
Liberal Democrats	Margaret Lloyd	543		
Labour	Jane McKean	68		
Turnout		1253	42.07	

Freshwater North
Party	Candidate	Votes	%	±%
Conservative	Andy Sutton	541		
Liberal Democrats	Martin Wareham	226		
Labour	Clive Burland	134		
Turnout		901	39.20	

Freshwater South
Party	Candidate	Votes	%	±%
Conservative	George Cameron	435		
Liberal Democrats	John Medland	389		
Independent	David Baggott	245		
Turnout		1069	44.53	

Godshill and Wroxall
Party	Candidate	Votes	%	±%
Independent	Rodney Downer	570		
Conservative	Alison Child	509		
Liberal Democrats	Dave Hardy	112		
Turnout		1191	45.14	

Havenstreet, Ashey and Haylands
Party	Candidate	Votes	%	±%
Independent	Vanessa Churchman	420		
Conservative	Conrad Gauntlett	395		
Liberal Democrats	Richard Fraser-Tait	210		
Turnout		1025	37.27	

Lake North
Party	Candidate	Votes	%	±%
Conservative	Jerry White	401		
Liberal Democrats	Peter Harris	356		
Labour	Deborah Gardiner	333		
Turnout		1090	39.11	

Lake South
Party	Candidate	Votes	%	±%
Conservative	Tim Hunter-Henderson	591		
Liberal Democrats	John Fleming	301		
Labour	Alan Hollands	128		
BNP	Dot Clynch	89		
Turnout		1109	42.46	

Nettlestone and Seaview
Party	Candidate	Votes	%	±%
Liberal Democrats	Reg Barry	855		
Conservative	Diana Tuson	607		
Turnout		1462	54.57	

Newport Central
Party	Candidate	Votes	%	±%
Conservative	Julie Jones-Evans	291		
Liberal Democrats	Andrew Garratt	186		
Independent	Jackie Hawkins	157		
Independent	Julian Whittaker	103		
Labour	Andy Woodhouse	70		
Turnout		807	28.46	

Newport East
Party	Candidate	Votes	%	±%
Labour	Geoff Lumley	449		
Conservative	Peter Humber	191		
Liberal Democrats	Cathy Wright	73		
Turnout		713	30.31	

Newport North
Party	Candidate	Votes	%	±%
Conservative	Dawn Cousins	508		
Liberal Democrats	Peter Whiteman	342		
Turnout		850	34.07	

Newport South
Party	Candidate	Votes	%	±%
Conservative	Roger Dixcey	395		
Liberal Democrats	Shirley Smart	315		
Labour	David Stott	135		
Turnout		845	32.29	

Newport West
Party	Candidate	Votes	%	±%
Conservative	David Whittaker	501		
Independent	Brian Rushton	182		
Liberal Democrats	Mike Carr	165		
Turnout		848	37.32	

Parkhurst
Party	Candidate	Votes	%	±%
Conservative	Richard Hollis	312		
Liberal Democrats	Garry Price	185		
Independent	Clive Page	145		
Labour	Steve Falla	63		
Turnout		705	29.75	

Ryde East
Party	Candidate	Votes	%	±%
Liberal Democrats	Dave Knowles	626		
Conservative	Peter Tuson	479		
Turnout		1105	38.67	

Ryde North East
Party	Candidate	Votes	%	±%
Independent	Wayne Whittle	364		
Conservative	Adrian Axford	318		
Liberal Democrats	Henry Adams	285		
Turnout		967	33.56	

Ryde North West
Party	Candidate	Votes	%	±%
Conservative	Arthur Taylor	531		
Liberal Democrats	Tim Wakeley	441		
Turnout		972	33.53	

Ryde South
Party	Candidate	Votes	%	±%
Liberal Democrats	Adrian Whittaker	275		
Independent	Charles Chapman	263		
Conservative	Gary Axford	217		
Labour	Ernest 'Jim' White	67		
Turnout		822	28.61	

Ryde West
Party	Candidate	Votes	%	±%
Independent	Ian Stephens	652		
Conservative	Sarah Doran	249		
Liberal Democrats	John Timmons	209		
Turnout		1110	39.20	

Sandown North
Party	Candidate	Votes	%	±%
Independent	Heather Humby	747		
Conservative	Rajesh Patel	179		
Turnout		926	39.46	

Sandown South
Party	Candidate	Votes	%	±%
Conservative	Ian Ward	547		
Liberal Democrats	Bob Blezzard	283		
Independent	Richard Davis	177		
Labour	Eric Goacher	43		
Turnout		1050	35.19	

Shanklin Central
Party	Candidate	Votes	%	±%
Conservative	David Williams	634		
Independent	Lincoln Wyatt	231		
Liberal Democrats	Sara Sheath	191		
Labour	Doreen Armstrong	61		
Turnout		1117	35.95	

Shanklin South
Party	Candidate	Votes	%	±%
Conservative	David Pugh	804		
Liberal Democrats	Lynda Fleming	161		
Independent	Anne Bishop	156		
Labour	Peter Coleman	58		
Turnout		1179	40.46	

Totland
Party	Candidate	Votes	%	±%
Liberal Democrats	John Howe	442		
Conservative	David Eccles	396		
Independent	Carol Bryan	304		
Turnout		1142	46.17	

Ventnor East
Party	Candidate	Votes	%	±%
Independent	Chris Welsford	503		
Conservative	Jonathan Fitzgerald-Bond	362		
Liberal Democrats	Harry Rees	150		
Turnout		1015	40.15	

Ventnor West
Party	Candidate	Votes	%	±%
Conservative	Susan Scoccia	562		
Independent	Stephen Stubbings	555		
Liberal Democrats	Wendy Ford	86		
Turnout		1203	47.18	

West Wight
Party	Candidate	Votes	%	±%
Independent	Stuart Dyer	719		
Conservative	Bill Burt	624		
Turnout		1343	46.04	

Whippingham and Osborne
Party	Candidate	Votes	%	±%
Conservative	Edward Giles	414		
Independent	Charles Hancock	398		
Liberal Democrats	Peter Lloyd	235		
Labour	Laraine Pascoe	60		
Turnout		1107	37.63	

Wootton Bridge
Party	Candidate	Votes	%	±%
Conservative	Barry Abraham	866		
Liberal Democrats	Ernest Smith	290		
Turnout		1156	41.22	

== See also ==
- Politics of the Isle of Wight
- 2009 United Kingdom local elections
