= Bob Seely =

British politician (born 1966)

Robert Seely MBE
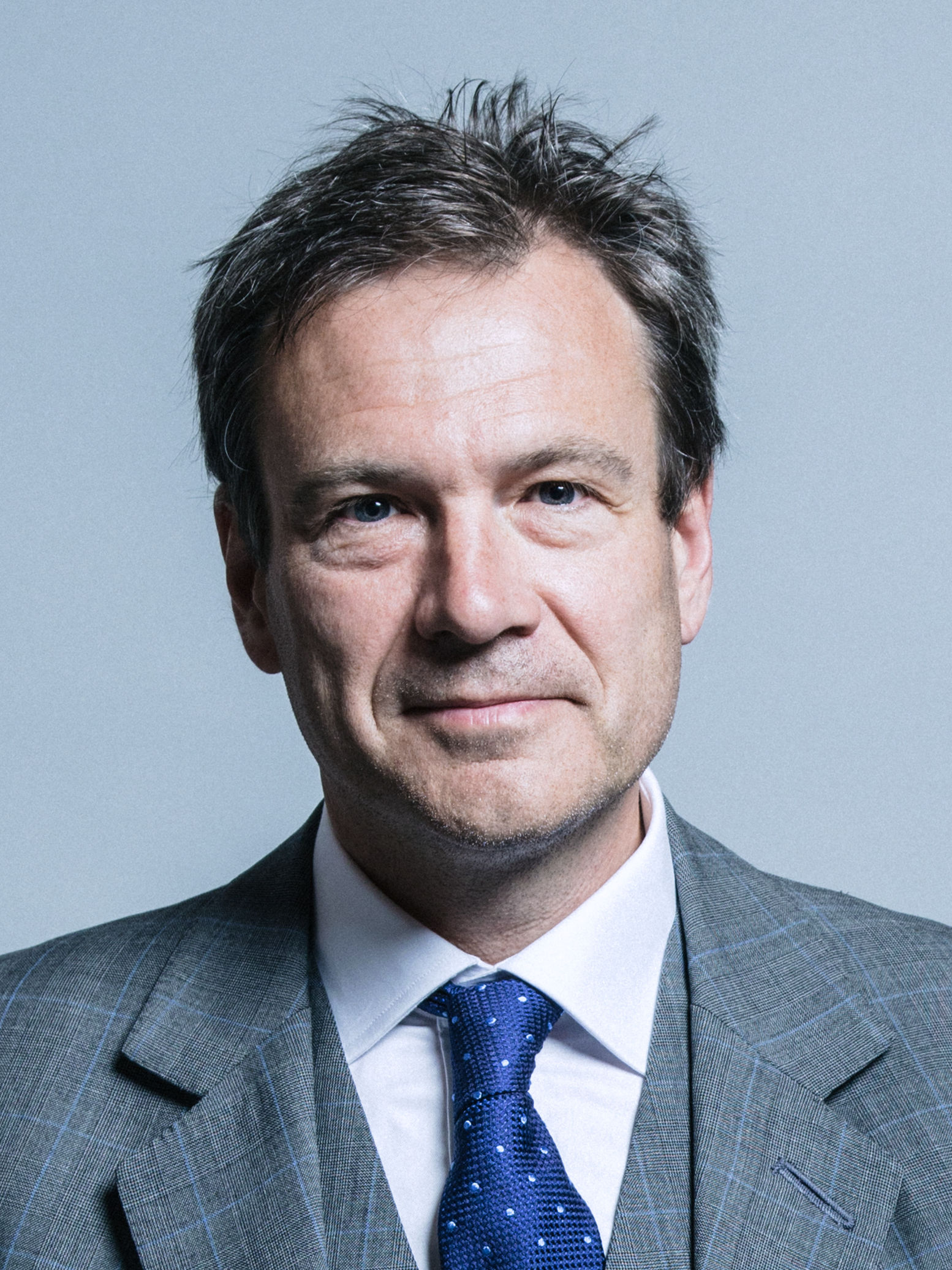
- Official portrait, 2017

Member of Parliament for Isle of Wight
- In office 8 June 2017 – 30 May 2024
- Preceded by: Andrew Turner
- Succeeded by: Constituency abolished

Personal details
- Born: 1966 (age 59–60) Marylebone, London, England
- Party: Conservative
- Spouse: Nur (m. 2025)
- Relatives: J. E. B. Seely, 1st Baron Mottistone (great-great-uncle)
- Education: Harrow School
- Alma mater: King's College London
- Website: www.bobseely.org.uk

Military service
- Allegiance: United Kingdom
- Branch/service: British Army
- Rank: Captain

Robert William Henry Seely MBE (born 1966) is a British Conservative Party politician who served as the Member of Parliament (MP) for the Isle of Wight from 2017 until the constituency was split in two in 2024.

Seely is a former journalist and soldier. From 1990 to 1995, he worked as a foreign correspondent in the USSR and in post-Soviet states. From 2008 to 2017, he served in the British Armed Forces on the Iraq, Afghanistan, Libya and ISIS campaigns. In the 2024 general election, he stood for the new Isle of Wight West constituency but was defeated.

== Early life and career ==
Robert Seely was born in 1966 in Marylebone, London. He was privately educated at both Arnold House School and at Harrow School. He then studied at King's College London.

=== Military ===
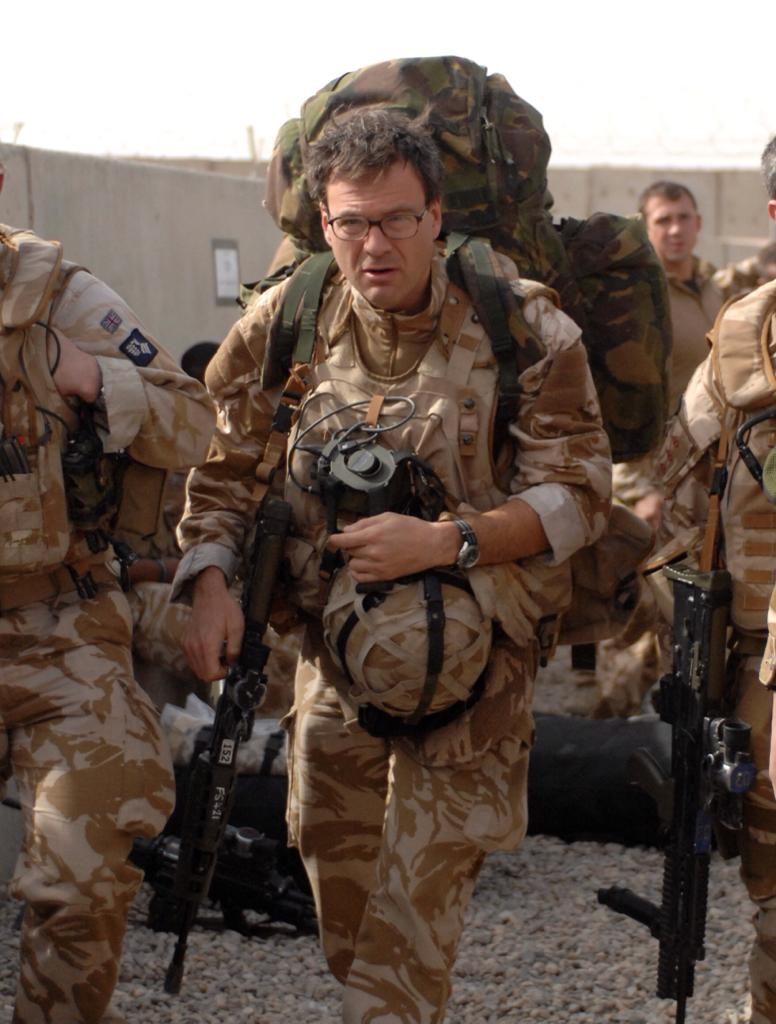
Seely on active service in Iraq

Seely served as both an NCO and officer in the UK Armed Forces. As a sergeant in the Territorial Army, he was awarded a Joint Commanders Commendation in 2009 for his tour in Iraq. He then served on the Afghanistan, Libya and ISIS campaigns. Seely was later commissioned as an officer.

Seely was awarded the Military MBE in the 2016 Operational Awards and Honours List whilst serving in the Intelligence Corps.

=== Academia ===
Seely has been a research associate at the Changing Character of War Programme at the University of Oxford.

In June 2018 Seely produced a definition of Russian hybrid war, in a paper entitled "A Definition of Contemporary Russian Conflict: how does the Kremlin Wage War?" The peer reviewed paper was produced by the Henry Jackson Society and presented in an event in the House of Commons on 4 June.

On 16 May 2019 Seely co-authored, with Peter Varnish and John Hemmings, an investigation into the Chinese tech giant Huawei and its possible role in the development of 5G. The report, published by the Henry Jackson Society, recommended barring Huawei from involvement in the UK's 5G infrastructure network. The report was endorsed by both Sir Richard Dearlove and former Australian Prime Minister Malcolm Turnbull.

In July 2019 Seely wrote for the Royal United Service Institute (RUSI) on the Surkov leaks, analysing the leaked emails to provide "a guide to Russian subversive warfare". Seely argued that: "Russia's modern practice of political subversion can be understood as a reinvention of 'active measures', a form of political conflict pioneered by the Soviet Union."

Seely's PhD in International Security Studies was awarded by King’s College, London, in April 2022 for a thesis entitled: "Uniting Ways of War for Perpetual Conflict, An Examination of Contemporary Russian Warfare".

== Political career ==
=== Early political career ===
Seely's political career began as a personal assistant to Shaun Woodward, until Woodward's defection to the Labour Party in 1999. Following this he worked at Conservative Central Office as an adviser on foreign affairs to Michael Howard, Francis Maude and Sir Malcolm Rifkind.

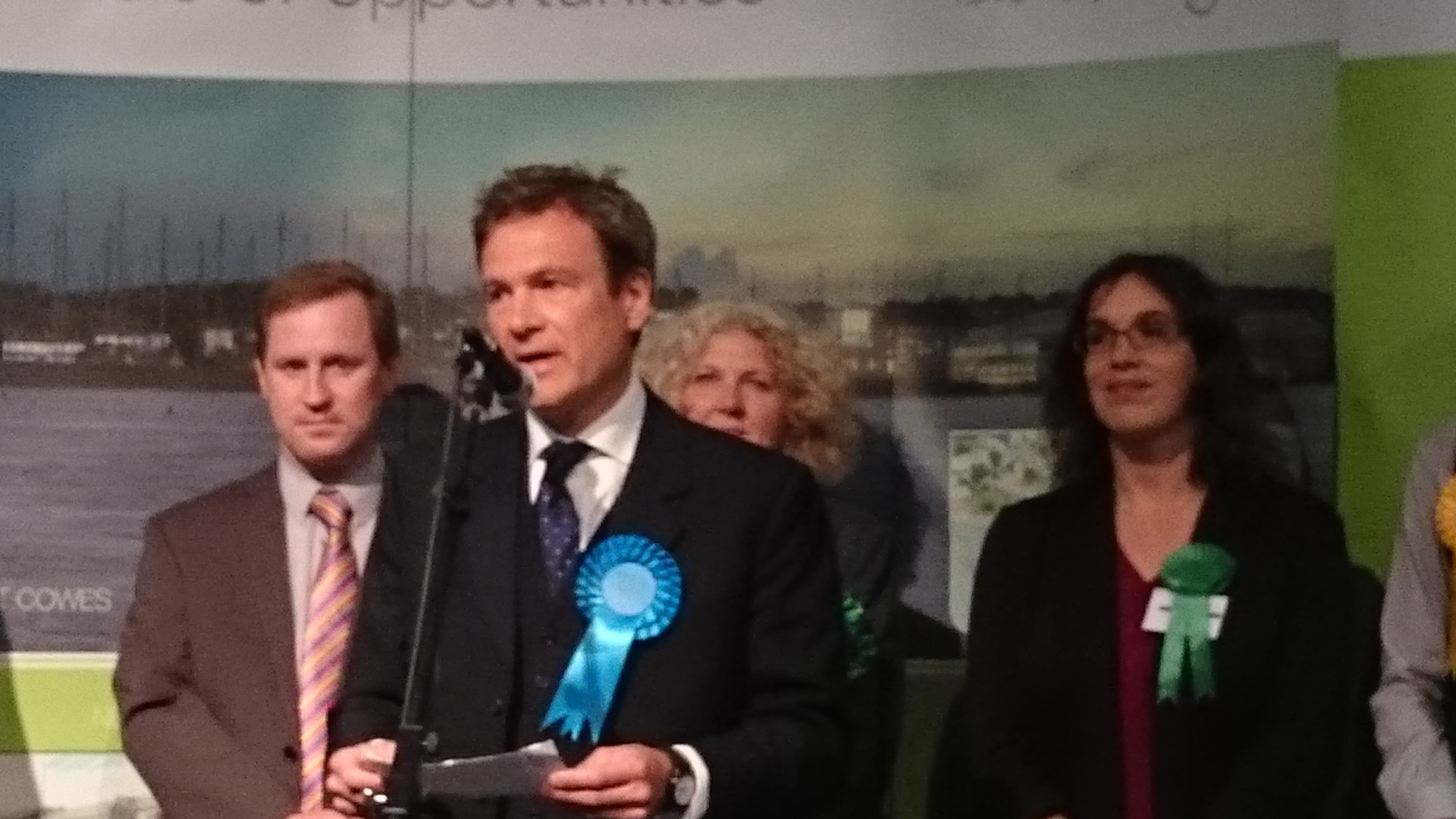
Seely at the 2017 General Election count at his Isle of Wight constituency

In the 2005 general election, Seely stood as the Conservative candidate in Broxtowe, coming second with 37.2% of the vote behind the incumbent Labour MP Nick Palmer.

=== Local government career ===
In 2013, he was elected for the Central Wight ward on the Isle of Wight Council for the Conservatives, and retained the seat in 2017. He resigned as a county Councillor in late 2017, once elected to Parliament.

=== Parliamentary career ===
==== First term as MP (2017–2019) ====
In the 2017 general election, Seely was elected to Parliament as MP for Isle of Wight with 51.3% of the vote and a majority of 21,069. In his maiden speech, Seely called for a better deal for the Isle of Wight from government.

Seely's first vote as an MP took place on 28 June 2017, where he voted against removing a pay cap for police and fire services. This was deemed controversial by some following his comments during his election campaign where he praised the emergency services following the fire at Grenfell Tower.

On 12 July 2017 Seely established the All Party Parliamentary Group (APPG) for UK Islands, to promote the interests of islands around the UK. The APPG aimed to encourage MPs and Peers from all political parties to join together to lobby government for their respective islands.

In October 2018 BBC News Online reported that Seely had accepted two free overseas trips abroad costing £4,410, which included a trip to Bahrain paid for by its government.

Also in October 2018, Seely hosted a press conference in parliament, in conjunction with the online investigative journalist website Bellingcat, to announce the identity of the second Skripal assassin suspect.

Seely was appointed the position of Parliamentary private secretary (PPS) to the Ministerial team at the Department for Environment, Food and Rural Affairs in January 2019. On 16 July 2019 Seely resigned from this position following his decision to vote against Government over HS2.

In February 2018 Seely was elected to sit on the Foreign Affairs Select Committee, whose remit is to examine the expenditure, administration and policy of the Foreign and Commonwealth Office (FCO).

In July 2018 Seely was elected to the Committees on Arms Export Controls.

Seely's manifesto, A Vision for the Island, was published a year after he entered parliament, in July 2018. In it, Seely set out how he believed that the Isle of Wight should develop over the coming decades, and covers areas such as housing, transport, health and education.

On 31 May 2019 Seely wrote an article for CapX stating that he was supporting Michael Gove in his bid to become leader of the Conservative Party.

==== Second term as MP (2019–2024) ====
At the 2019 general election, Seely was re-elected as MP for Isle of Wight with an increased majority of 23,737, and an increased percentage of the vote of 56.2%.

In early May 2020, during the COVID-19 pandemic, the Government announced that a contact-tracing app would be trialled on the Isle of Wight, a move for which Seely had lobbied Government. Prior to the lockdown, Seely had warned ministers to ensure the emergency supply to the island, and threatened to amend legislation unless the Government acted. Shortly after, the Department of Transport, the Isle of Wight Council and the IOW Transport Infrastructure Board announced an emergency package to support the island. In a subsequent article on Conservative Home, Seely argued that working with central Government to pilot national schemes was the best way to ensure the Isle of Wight was able to be at the cutting edge of innovative tech to improve its quality of life, especially in healthcare. He cited the use of drones to supply St Mary's Hospital and money for the island's telemedicine project.

On 22 May 2020 Seely and his then girlfriend (Iona Stewart-Richardson, at that time a reporter for Isle of Wight Radio) attended a gathering in the village of Seaview to speak to Freddy Gray, deputy editor of The Spectator. By attending, Seely breached social distancing restrictions. He stated that he had gone to speak to Gray regarding his article about the app. Seely apologised two weeks later, saying that "I called this wrong". In an interview with Isle of Wight Radio, Seely said he "only had half a sausage" whilst in the garden and did not enter the house.

On 11 June 2020 The Times quoted Seely in a report that the NHS app may have had a role in suppressing the virus on the Isle of Wight. Seely told his local County Press newspaper that the analysis needed more research to ensure its accuracy. "In blunt terms", he said, "this is the best evidence we may get that the app saved lives of Islanders". On the same day, Seely spoke on a House of Commons debate on zoos, welcoming their reopening following the COVID-19 lockdown, and urging the UK Government to support zoos and animal sanctuaries on the island.

Seely contributed to an April 2020 study examining the strategic trade dependency on China of the "Five Eyes" group of nations. The report coincided with a letter written by Seely and a group of UK Conservative MPs to request the Government be legally required to update Parliament annually on the UK's strategic trade dependency on China and potentially other nations. The letter – which cited the Henry Jackson Society report – was signed by 21 MPs.

Seely voted in favour of the Police Crime Sentencing and Courts Bill at the second debate on 16 March 2021. The Bill was considered controversial in media reports, in part due to the perceived restrictions it would place on protests and protestors. Seely was subsequently criticised on social media.

In June 2022 Seely voted to have confidence in the Conservative Party leadership of Boris Johnson after receiving council funding assurances. In the July–September 2022 Conservative Party leadership election during August of that year, Seely backed Penny Mordaunt and then Liz Truss to become leader and Prime Minister, arguing that Truss was the “candidate best able to deal with” the major issues facing the country, particularly on the economy and foreign affairs.

In the further leadership election in 2022 following the collapse of the Truss administration, Seely backed Penny Mordaunt.

Seely was listed Chair & Registered Contact of the APPG on Ukraine, which he joined 30 November 2022. As of February 2023, he also was listed on the Anti-Corruption and Responsible Tax, Dark Skies, Events, Hong Kong, Iraq, Latvia, Lithuania, Mexico, Russia, and South Western Railway APPGs.

Prior to the 2024 general election, the Isle of Wight constituency was abolished as a result of the 2023 periodic review of Westminster constituencies and were split into two constituencies. Seely stood for the Isle of Wight West constituency but was defeated by the Labour candidate Richard Quigley.

== Post-parliamentary career ==
Following his defeat at the 2024 UK General Election, Seely has worked as a Director of Strategy at defence company Trypillian.

== Personal life ==
Seely was born to an English father and German mother. He comes from a family long involved in politics. His great-great-uncle, Jack Seely (later created 1st Baron Mottistone), was MP for the Isle of Wight between 1900 and 1906 and again between 1923 and 1924.

He is a keen swimmer and has swum the Solent a number of times for charity, most recently in August 2020 to raise funds for the West Wight Sports and Community Centre.

In July 2018 Seely took part in the parade for Isle of Wight Pride, where he was joined by Conchita Wurst. In an interview with Pink News following the event, Seely stated that he felt that "for dictators, gays are the new Jews".

In 2025 he got married in Brook, Isle of Wight to Nur. The couple were then expecting a baby together.

== Bibliography ==
- War and Humanitarian Action in Chechnya (Occasional paper) (Thomas J. Watson Jr. Institute for International Studies, 1996) ASIN B0006QNGGS
- Russo-Chechen Conflict, 1800–2000: A Deadly Embrace (Soviet Russian Military Experience) (Routledge, 2001) ISBN 0714680605
- The New Total War: From Child Abduction to Cyber Attacks and Drones to Disinformation – Russia’s Conflict with Ukraine and the West (Biteback Publishing, 2025) ISBN 1785909487

== Honours ==
Member of the Order of the British Empire (MBE)	2016
Iraq Medal	
OSM for Afghanistan	
Queen Elizabeth II Diamond Jubilee Medal	2012

Parliament of the United Kingdom
Preceded by Andrew Turner	Member of Parliament for the Isle of Wight; 2017–2024	Succeeded by Constituency abolished
