= 2005 Isle of Wight Council election =

Local election in England

Results of the 2005 Isle of Wight Council election

The 2005 Isle of Wight Council elections were held on the Isle of Wight, England, on 5 May 2005. The result led to a landslide Conservative victory gaining 22 councillors, leading the Isle of Wight to Conservative control from no overall control previously.

== Results ==
The party standings following the election:

Party	2001 Cllrs	Gain/Loss	2005 Cllrs
Conservative Party	13	+22	35
Independents	13	−7	6
Liberal Democrats	19	−14	5
Labour Party	3	−1	2
Total	48	–	48

The outcome of the election led to a significant change in composition of the Isle of Wight Council. Prior to the election, the Liberal Democrats were the largest group overall but still didn't hold a majority, leading to a coalition known as 'Island First' with independent councillors. The election showed a fall in support for the Liberal Democrats as the Conservatives gained 23 seats and took over as the largest group with a majority of 22. Following the change in control of the council, Cllr Andy Sutton took over with the promise that every aspect of the Conservative manifesto would be followed as they had indicated before the election. Despite this promise there has been some debate on how well the original manifesto has been followed.

== Ward results ==
The following are results from each electoral ward.

Ashey
Party	Candidate	Votes	%	±%
Conservative	Vanessa Churchman	513		
Independent	Leslie Kirkby	495		
Liberal Democrats	Richard Tait	422		

Bembridge North
Party	Candidate	Votes	%	±%
Conservative	Sarah Pigot	689		
Liberal Democrats	Barbara Clough	422		

Bembridge South
Party	Candidate	Votes	%	±%
Conservative	Winifred McRobert	750		
Liberal Democrats	Gordon Kendall	353		
Labour	Alexander Rickard	151		

Binstead
Party	Candidate	Votes	%	±%
Conservative	Ivan Bulwer	1,185		
Liberal Democrats	Ernest Fox	628		

Brading and St Helens
Party	Candidate	Votes	%	±%
Conservative	Patrick Joyce	1,256		
Liberal Democrats	David Cleaver	607		

Brighstone and Calbourne
Party	Candidate	Votes	%	±%
Conservative	Colin West	810		
Liberal Democrats	Jill Wareham	687		
Labour	Peter Turner	106		

Carisbrooke East
Party	Candidate	Votes	%	±%
Conservative	David Whittaker	567		
Liberal Democrats	Kevin Jacobs	402		
Labour	Michael Nobbs	273		
Independent	Peter Foster	181		

Carisbrooke West
Party	Candidate	Votes	%	±%
Independent	Barbara Foster	468		
Liberal Democrats	Liam Verstraeten	390		
Conservative	Stephen Gray	292		
Independent	Dennis Lewis	177		
Labour	Doris Frizel	139		

Central Rural
Party	Candidate	Votes	%	±%
Conservative	Erica Oulton	1,016		
Liberal Democrats	Michael Carr	525		

Chale, Niton and Whitwell
Party	Candidate	Votes	%	±%
Conservative	Wendy Arnold	930		
Liberal Democrats	Malcolm Groves	463		
Independent	Richard Etherington	256		

Cowes Castle East
Party	Candidate	Votes	%	±%
Conservative	Alan Wells	620		
Independent	Wendy Wardrop	345		
UKIP	Paul Birch	79		

Cowes Castle West
Party	Candidate	Votes	%	±%
Conservative	John Effemey	797		
Liberal Democrats	Stephen Tibble	519		

Cowes Central
Party	Candidate	Votes	%	±%
Conservative	Lora Peacey-Wilcox	608		
Liberal Democrats	David Hill	573		

Cowes Medina
Party	Candidate	Votes	%	±%
Conservative	George Brown	342		
Labour	Kenn Pearson	318		
Liberal Democrats	Peter Lloyd	272		
UKIP	Rosemary Lynden-Bell	47		

East Cowes North
Party	Candidate	Votes	%	±%
Conservative	Margaret Webster	596		
Liberal Democrats	Margaret Lloyd	390		
Labour	Jane Turner	137		

East Cowes South
Party	Candidate	Votes	%	±%
Independent	Muriel Miller	863		
Conservative	Simon Walker	463		

Fairlee
Party	Candidate	Votes	%	±%
Conservative	Eugenie-Dawn Cousins	847		
Liberal Democrats	Marc Morgan-Huws	411		

Freshwater Afton
Party	Candidate	Votes	%	±%
Conservative	Gillian Kennett	856		
Liberal Democrats	Brian Hinton	430		
Independent	Collin Lillywhite	261		

Freshwater Norton
Party	Candidate	Votes	%	±%
Conservative	Robert Sutton	817		
Liberal Democrats	Martin Wareham	448		

Gurnard
Party	Candidate	Votes	%	±%
Conservative	John Hobart	504		
Independent	Paul Fuller	307		
Liberal Democrats	Robert Wilkinson	182		

Lake North
Party	Candidate	Votes	%	±%
Labour	Deborah Gardiner	451		
Conservative	Constance Cowley	414		
Liberal Democrats	Peter Harris	390		

Lake South
Party	Candidate	Votes	%	±%
Conservative	Timothy Hunter-Henderson	652		
Liberal Democrats	Anne Stuart	410		
Labour	David Piggott	262		

Mount Joy
Party	Candidate	Votes	%	±%
Conservative	Shelagh Swan	565		
Liberal Democrats	Shirley Smart	356		
Labour	Stuart Clements	221		
Liberal	Richard Carruthers	30		

Newchurch
Party	Candidate	Votes	%	±%
Conservative	Brian Mosdell	701		
Independent	Robert Richards	620		
Independent	John Rackett	187		

Newport North
Party	Candidate	Votes	%	±%
Conservative	Jullian Whittaker	393		
Labour	Nicholas Wray	337		
Liberal Democrats	Malcolm Ross	291		

Newport South
Party	Candidate	Votes	%	±%
Conservative	Michael Cunningham	593		
Labour	Cordula Rayner	355		
Liberal Democrats	Guy Radclyffe	298		

Northwood
Party	Candidate	Votes	%	±%
Independent	Roger Mazillius	1		

Osborne
Party	Candidate	Votes	%	±%
Independent	Charles Hancock	408		
Conservative	Alan Nightingale	398		
Labour	Laraine Pascoe	250		
Socialist Labour	James Spensley	36		

Pan
Party	Candidate	Votes	%	±%
Labour	Geoffrey Lumley	483		
Conservative	Clive Page	337		
Liberal Democrats	Ian Moth	221		

Parkhurst
Party	Candidate	Votes	%	±%
Liberal Democrats	Gary Price	522		
Conservative	Roger Berrisford	438		
Labour	Steven Falla	248		

Ryde North East
Party	Candidate	Votes	%	±%
Liberal Democrats	John Adams	552		
Conservative	David Woodward	470		
Labour	Ernest White	204		

Ryde North West
Party	Candidate	Votes	%	±%
Conservative	Albert Taylor	804		
Liberal Democrats	Michael Nobbs	375		
Independent	Anthony Gordon	271		

Ryde South East
Party	Candidate	Votes	%	±%
Liberal Democrats	Brian Chapman	866		
Conservative	Adrian Axford	463		

Ryde South West
Party	Candidate	Votes	%	±%
Independent	Ian Stephens	669		
Conservative	Peter Newman	358		
Labour	Christine Wilde	338		

Sandown South
Party	Candidate	Votes	%	±%
Conservative	Ian Ward	600		
Liberal Democrats	Robert Blezzard	475		
Independent	Ronald Teasdale	357		

Sandown North
Party	Candidate	Votes	%	±%
Independent	Heather Humby	986		
Conservative	Dawn Martin	339		

Seaview and Nettlestone
Party	Candidate	Votes	%	±%
Conservative	Diana Tuson	949		
Liberal Democrats	Reginald Barry	844		

Shalfleet and Yarmouth
Party	Candidate	Votes	%	±%
Conservative	William Burt	933		
Liberal Democrats	Peter Garlick	497		

Shanklin Central
Party	Candidate	Votes	%	±%
Conservative	David Pugh	906		
Labour	Peter Coleman	298		
Independent	John Fleming	285		

Shanklin North
Party	Candidate	Votes	%	±%
Conservative	David Williams	727		
Labour	Alan Hollands	434		
Liberal Democrats	Diana Beevers	304		

Shanklin South
Party	Candidate	Votes	%	±%
Conservative	Anne Bishop	889		
Independent	Harold Rees	524		

Ryde St John's East
Party	Candidate	Votes	%	±%
Liberal Democrats	David Knowles	698		
Conservative	Robert Woodgate	689		

Ryde St John's West
Party	Candidate	Votes	%	±%
Liberal Democrats	John Bowker	719		
Conservative	Rosalind Whitworth	340		

Totland
Party	Candidate	Votes	%	±%
Conservative	George Cameron	738		
Liberal Democrats	John Howe	726		

Ventnor East
Party	Candidate	Votes	%	±%
Conservative	Jonathan Fitzgerald-Bond	554		
Independent	Brenda Lawson	451		
Liberal Democrats	Peter Doran	271		
Green	Louis Lawrence	251		

Ventnor West
Party	Candidate	Votes	%	±%
Conservative	Susan Scoccia	688		
Independent	Albert Bartlett	448		
Liberal Democrats	David White	283		
Independent	Paul Hatchwell	229		

Wootton
Party	Candidate	Votes	%	±%
Conservative	Barry Abraham	1,216		
Liberal Democrats	Barry Townsend	635		

Wroxall and Godshill
Party	Candidate	Votes	%	±%
Conservative	Jillian Wood	1,136		
Liberal Democrats	Catherine Wright	633		

== See also ==
- Politics of the Isle of Wight
