= Education reforms on the Isle of Wight =

Education reforms on the Isle of Wight is part of a process to change the Isle of Wight's education from a three-tier system to a two-tier system. The debate as to how this should occur was first started in 2004, lasting until 2008. Three options were put forward at the start of 2008 as to what kind of education system would be best to move forward with. However, as all included the closure of large numbers of island schools, they produced a negative reaction with many local islanders, resulting in protests occurring in the main towns of Newport, Ryde, Shanklin and Sandown. A final decision was made in May, announcing which schools would be closed. The decision was made based on all three options put forward, instead of going down one definite path. The reforms were first implemented in September 2008, with everything aimed at completion by September 2010.

== History ==
In 2004, the Isle of Wight Council undertook a consultative process aimed at changing local education structure, to a two tier school system which would bring the island in line with the rest of the country. The move was opposed by a lobby known as Standards not Tiers based in Ventnor, as well as the Conservatives, who, under the leadership of then-council leader David Pugh eventually U-turned and proceeded to close the middle schools.

The Annual Performance Assessment of the Isle of Wight Council's Education and Children's Social Care Services 2005, carried out by Office for Standards in Education and the Commission for Social Care Inspection, found low levels of achievements for pupils in schools and a lack of significant and sustained progress over the last five years. Overall, the Isle of Wight Council’s capacity to improve its services for children and young people was judged to be 'adequate', out of the four ratings 'very good', 'promising', 'adequate' or 'inadequate'.

In 2006, the regional Learning and Skills Council proposed an option which meant replacing the secondary schools' sixth forms with central provision at the Isle of Wight College. In January 2007, the authority rejected this proposal, and instead offered its own, which included a reduced number of secondary schools and the retention of Year 9 pupils in Middle schools, extending their range to form 9–14 schools and 14–19 provision at High Schools, an arrangement adopted nowhere else in the United Kingdom.

The debate took on new urgency at the start of 2008, when three 'key options' were put forward by the Isle of Wight Council for public consultation, each of which meant the closure of at least half of the Island's primary schools. On 14 January 2008, the Council announced that at least 23 primary schools and one middle school (expected to be Nodehill Middle School) would be closed, whichever education pathway was chosen in March.

== Protests ==
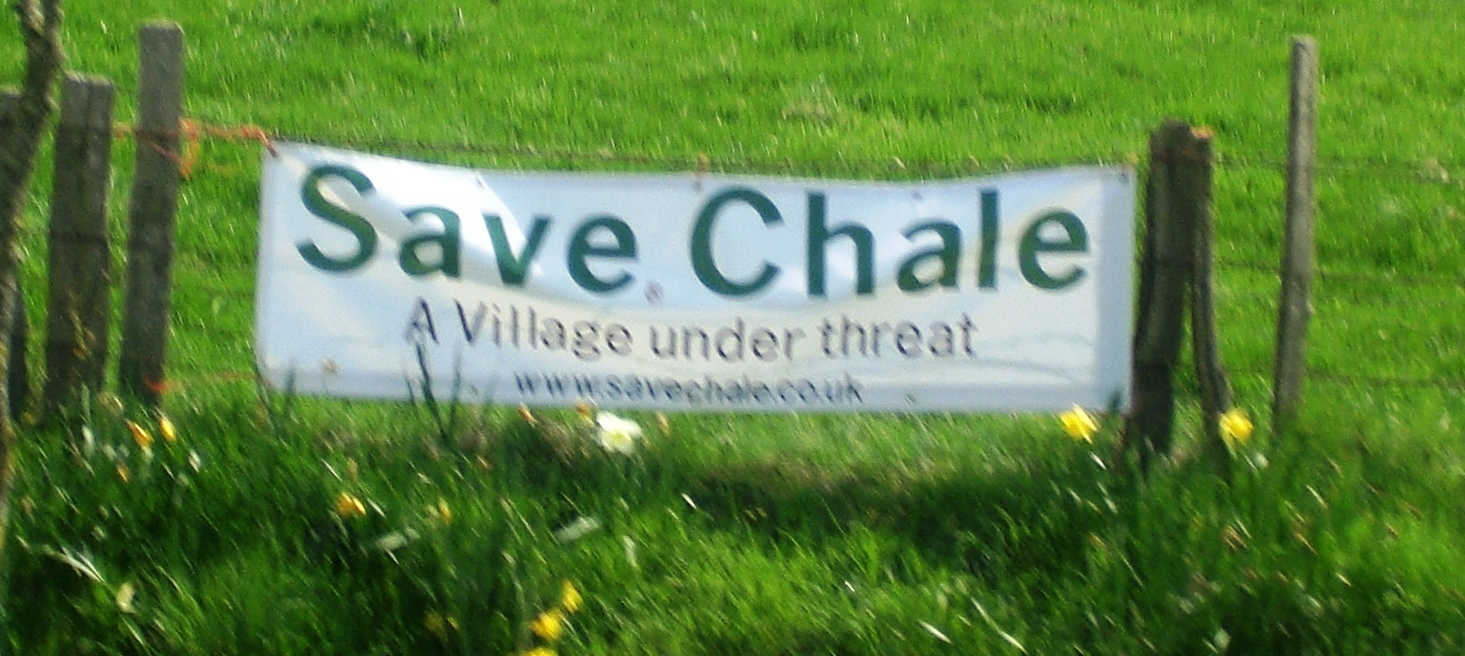
A banner campaigning to save Chale Primary School from closure.

The 'biggest protest the Island has ever seen' occurred outside County Hall in Newport on 26 January 2008 at 10:00am lasting an hour until 11:00am, led by Chris Welsford of Standards Not Tiers who was accompanied by Isle of Wight Radio DJ Alex Dyke as a result of the Council's plans for education reforms. Between 1,000 and 1,250 took part in the protest, including parents, teachers and students. The Island MP Andrew Turner, with two other councillors also attended the protest, disagreeing with the plans.

Later protests also occurred at Shanklin through the leader of the Isle of Wight Council, Councillor David Pugh's ward, with a silent march through the town. Later protests occurred at Sandown and Ryde, with a final protest taking place again in Newport.

== Final Decision ==
It was finally announced on 23 May 2008 which schools would be closed. The final decision took parts of all three options, bringing the island into line with the rest of England with a two-tier system. Three primary schools will close completely, with 15 others no longer operating on their current sites. St Helens Primary, Chale CE Primary, and Weston Primary School were all announced to be closing completely, while others are amalgamated onto existing primary or middle school sites.

As a two-tier system requires no middle schools, by September 2010 there will be 38 primary schools in total and six high schools. The sites of existing middle schools will either be used for new amalgamated primary schools or new sites for high schools. Forelands Middle School and Nodehill Middle School are currently the only middle school sites which will have no use after their closure.

== Implementation ==
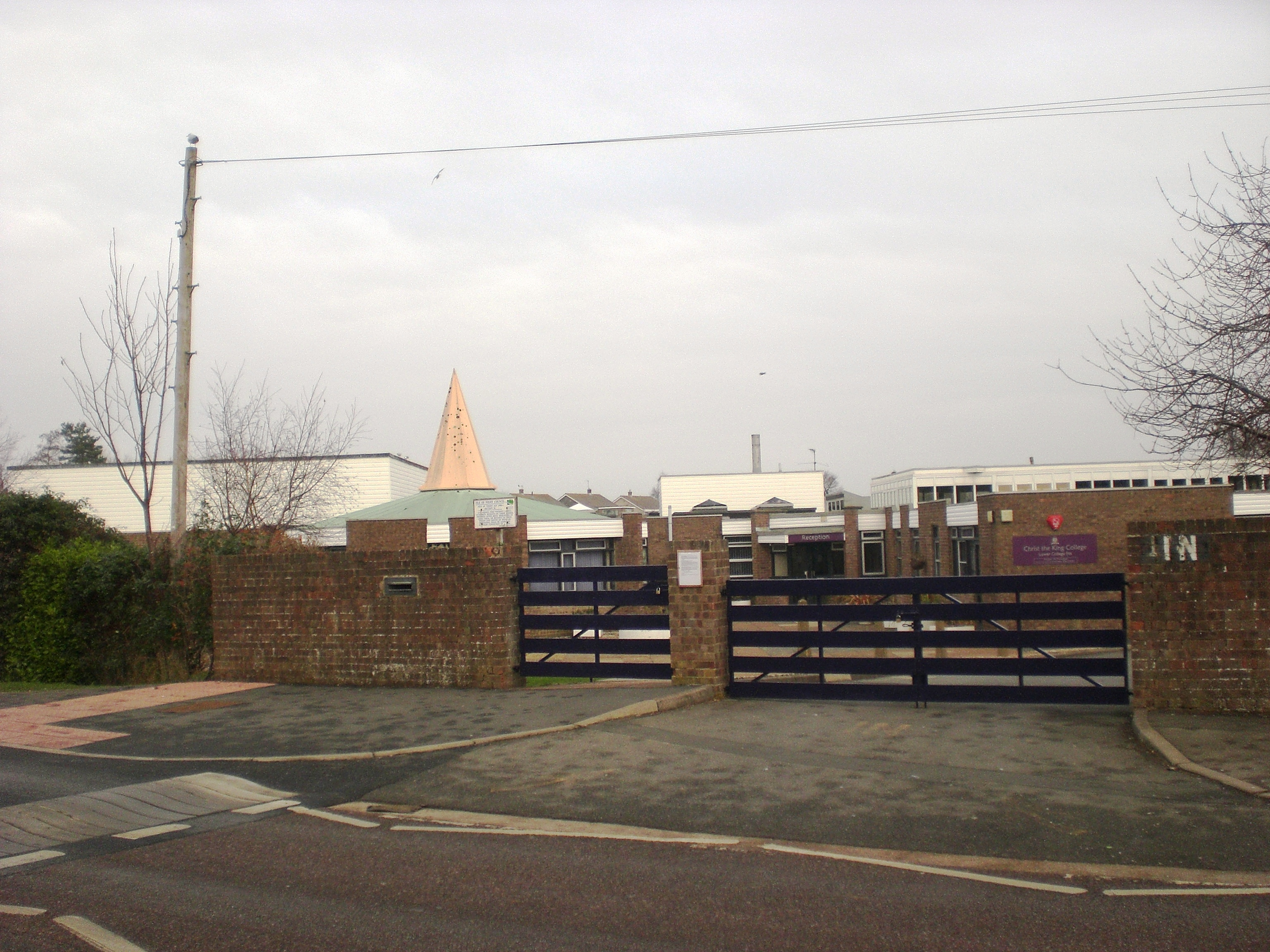
The new Christ the King College, on the former Trinity Middle School site.

The first stages of implementation took place in September 2008, with the final stages aimed at being complete by September 2010. This involved ABK Middle School and Trinity Middle School merging to form Christ the King College. Although the site currently only takes years 5–8, by the time the system is fully implemented it will take a full age range. Kitbridge Middle School also merged with Downside Middle School. So far, two headteachers from both Medina High School and Cowes High School have announced they will be stepping down before the start of the new term in September, stating the education reforms as an influence to their decision.
