= David Pugh (politician, born 1980) =

British politician (born 1980)

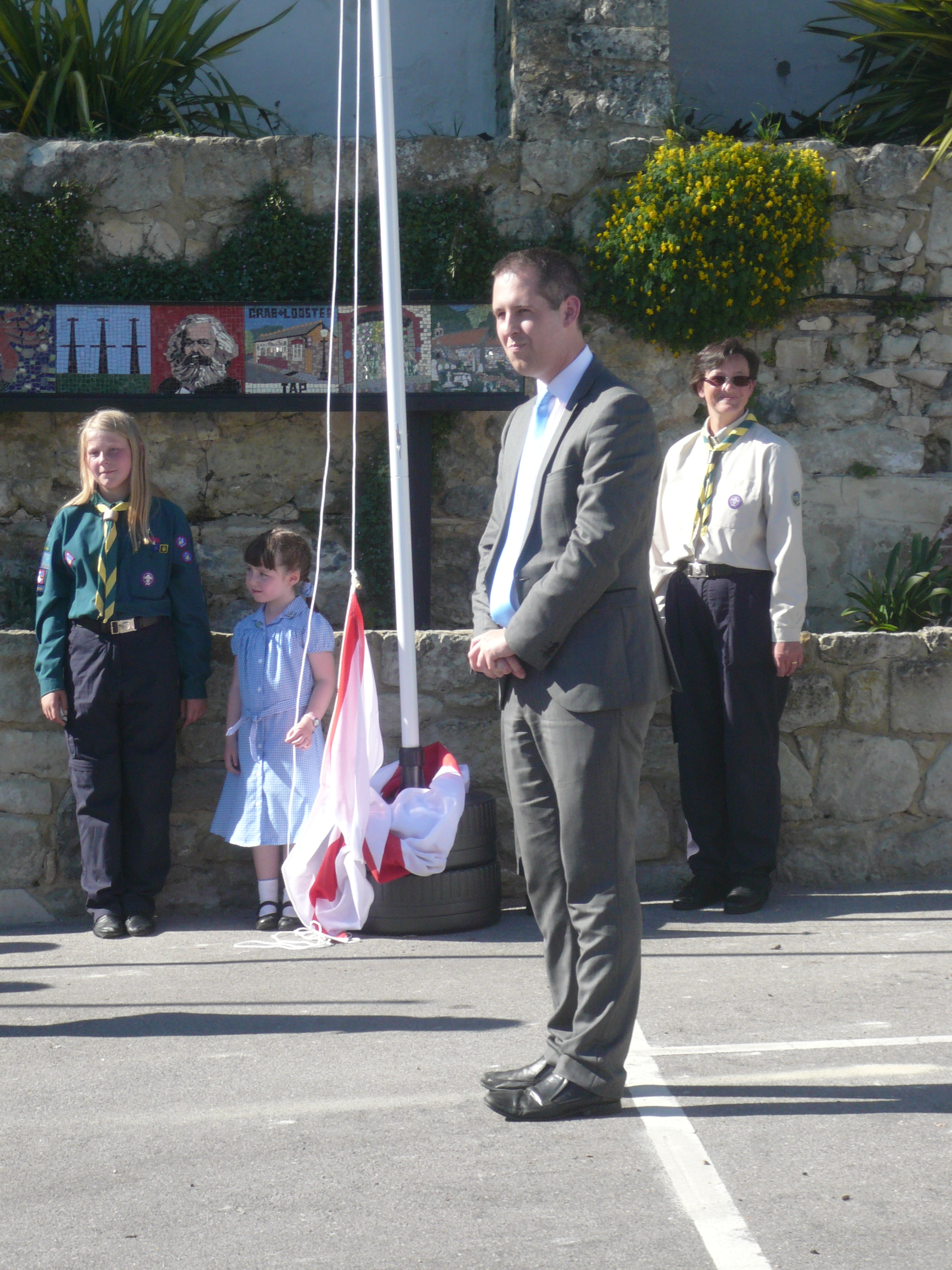
- David Pugh seen in Ventnor in 2011.
- Born: 17 April 1980 (age 46); Isle of Wight
- Occupation: Cratus Communications
- Known for: Former Leader of Isle of Wight Council

David Pugh (born 1980 in Newport) is a former Conservative councillor and served as leader of the Isle of Wight Council between September 2007 and May 2013, making him the longest serving leader of the local authority since its inception in 1995. He was first elected to the Isle of Wight Council at the local elections in May 2005 as a member for the Shanklin Central Ward, re-elected in the June 2009 elections to the Shanklin South Ward, losing his seat in the 2013 local elections after 2 other candidates withdrew, making the election a straight choice between Pugh and Independent, Richard Priest. Consequently, he ceased to be council leader.

Shortly after his failed re-election bid, Pugh resigned from Shanklin Town Council.

== Early life ==
David Pugh was born on the Isle of Wight, growing up in Newport, Lake and Shanklin. He was educated in the Island's school system at Westmont and Newport CE Primary Schools, Trinity Middle School (now Christ the King College) and Sandown High School. He then went on to study politics at the University of Aberystwyth, Wales and failed to complete the final year of the 3-year course.

== Political career ==
Prior to work as a local councillor for the Isle of Wight, David Pugh worked at the Conservative Central Office in Westminster holding the position of Head of Youth with the responsibility for Conservative Future. This was a post he held for 4 years between 2000 and 2004. During this time, he visited several Eastern European countries, representing the Westminster Foundation for Democracy.

=== Isle of Wight Council ===
In 2004 Pugh returned to live on the island and was elected to both the Isle of Wight Council and Shanklin Town Council in 2005. Between May 2005 and April 2007 Pugh served as Cabinet Secretary on the Isle of Wight Council. After April 2007 he was appointed as Cabinet Member for Regeneration, Leisure and Communications.

In September 2007, following the resignation of Cllr Andy Sutton, Pugh was elected as Leader of the Isle of Wight Council, a post he held until May 2013. His appointment at the age of 27 made him the youngest local authority leader in the country, and he remained one of the youngest leaders – at the age of 33 – when he left office over five years later having been defeated in local elections.

In November 2010, Pugh was subject to a vote of no confidence by Unison members who work for the IOW Council after proposing 535 job cuts at the council, and cuts to services such as libraries, swimming pools, and tourist information centres. These cuts later went ahead under Pugh's leadership, amid protests and a court challenge over library closures.

During his time as Council Leader, Pugh implemented a series of major policy changes, including: an Islandwide reorganisation of schools; the securing of £487m grant funding from the government for Island roads through a PFI scheme the introduction of an award-winning Council pre-apprenticeship scheme to prepare young people for full apprenticeships, and new waste collection arrangements which increased recycling rates but initially caused a record 60,491 phone calls to be made to County Hall in January 2012 following their introduction.

=== Post Isle of Wight Council work ===
In 2010 Pugh was appointed a member of the Ministerial Advisory Group on the role of local authorities in education and children's services, supporting the then Secretary of State for Education, Michael Gove. Pugh was also appointed as a member of the Local Government Association's Children & Young People Programme Board. In 2011, Pugh was appointed as a director of the newly formed Solent Local Enterprise Partnership.

Following his departure from the Isle of Wight Council, Pugh continued his work for Cratus Communications, a role he had previously held on a part-time basis during his work with the council, despite criticism. He currently works as Director for The Chine Consultancy Advice Limited.

With growing fears over the future of the Isle of Wight's rail service, Island Line, which at the time required over £40 million of investment to keep going, Pugh formed cross-party campaign group "Keep Island Line in Franchise (KILF)" alongside previous Labour party election candidates Deborah Gardiner & Stewart Blackmore.

=== Isle Of Wight Conservative Association ===
On 29 March 2018, Pugh was elected by the Isle of Wight Conservatives as Association Chairman, leading one member to state that he would leave the Conservative party or association if Pugh were elected chairman. Chris Whitehouse, a controversial Isle of Wight Conservative Councillor, said:

“Along with many councillor colleagues, I would find it impossible to continue to serve as a Conservative if the man who wrecked the Island’s education system so comprehensively were elected Association Chairman. It would be an insult to a generation of children and their parents. We’re still undoing the damage he did – damage so bad that the entire Island school system was put into special measures by the national Government. This wouldn’t be a joke, it would be a nightmare and would divide and risk completely destroying the Conservative Association. I’m not surprised Pugh has kept his plan secret until the very last minute. It’s bl**dy typical.”

On 31 March 2018, Chris Whitehouse suspended all his involvement with the Conservative Association for 6 months due to Pugh's appointment as chairman.

== Controversies ==
=== PughTube ===
During his time as Council Leader Pugh was involved an incident outside a Charity Valentine's Ball at Cowes Yacht Haven, in which he swore at Carole Dennett, the parliamentary assistant and partner of then MP Andrew Turner telling her to "fucking leave us alone". The event occurred in public, was recorded on video, and a video clip later uploaded to the video sharing website YouTube. Pugh was investigated under the Island's Council's Code of Conduct, which "covers councillors when they act, claim to act or give the impression they are acting as a representative of the authority", and cleared.

After being cleared, Pugh continued to attempt to stop publication of articles referring to what had become known locally as the 'PughTube incident'. This included the publication of a letter written to all members of the Isle of Wight council by Carole Dennett in which she stated she was unhappy with the way the investigation into an alleged breach of the code of conduct was handled.

=== Cowes Enterprise College ===
After being unelected from office, Pugh refused to return to the IOW council offices to answer questions about Cowes Enterprise College, a school building project which ran over budget and is currently uncompleted. Pugh stated "...it is for the independent leadership of the Council to explain on what grounds they exonerated the two senior officers on whose watch this major project was not delivered on time, on budget or fit-for-purpose, leaving this legacy of problems...". He stated that he was 'no longer publicly accountable' as he ceased to hold public office in May 2013; although the issues surrounding Cowes Enterprise College arose during his tenure as Council Leader.

Further to this, Pugh accepted 'overall political responsibility' for the Cowes Enterprise College project's defects, and once again sought to lay the blame at the feet of two former council officers. Pugh also sought to cast blame on the previous Labour government, stating "The money for this school was awarded under the previous government's Building Schools for the Future (BSF) initiative, which was subsequently widely derided for its poor value-for-money and ineffectiveness."

Pugh noted in his public letter, dated 25 April 2014, that he considered one of the Islands Council's officers "bore operational responsibility alongside the Chief Executive", and questioned the appropriateness of their exoneration and the use taxpayers' money to pay them a settlement. According to the council, the settlement was agreed to avoid "the potential costs of defending the cases at tribunal and the costs of any potentially successful claims for compensation" over a process started under Pugh's leadership.

In response to Pugh's statement, one of the exonerated Council officers responded stating "David Pugh is being disingenuous. This was a large complicated project that had many people involved in the decision-making process throughout my involvement..."

== Electoral performance ==
=== 2005 ===
Shanklin Central
Party	Candidate	Votes	%	±%
Conservative	David Pugh	906		
Labour	Peter Coleman	298		
Independent	John Fleming	285		

=== 2009 ===
For the Isle of Wight Council election in 2009, Pugh switched wards to contest the new Shanklin South seat, which due to boundary changes incorporated part of his previous seat of Shanklin Central. Despite unveiling plans to reform education on the island which were seen as contentious, prior to the announcement of the results Pugh stated that he had been "Quietly confident securing a majority". When the final results were declared, some key players involved with the education reform plans had lost their seats, but Pugh managed to retain his with a comfortable majority. His party also won a majority of seats on the Isle of Wight Council.

Shanklin South
Party	Candidate	Votes	%	±%
Conservative	David Pugh	804		
Liberal Democrats	Lynda Fleming	161		
Independent	Anne Bishop	156		
Labour	Peter Coleman	58		
Turnout		1179	40.46	

=== 2013 ===
After two terms in power, the Conservative party lost a total of nine seats and their majority at the Isle of Wight council. Pugh faced a concerted effort to remove him during this election and lost by 10 votes to Richard Priest. Such was the feeling against him, 2 candidates withdrew from the election to allow Richard Priest a clear run against Pugh.

Labour candidate for Shanklin South, Peter Coleman, said upon his withdrawal "Electors in the ward now have a clear alternative candidate (Richard Priest) to David Pugh, who has been a disastrous Leader of the County Council. A ground swell is taking place in Shanklin around a community based and respected local man [Richard Priest]. This is a difficult ward politically for Labour to win, and this decision has been taken to maximise the vote in opposition to the cuts in the public services to Shanklin taken by this Conservative Council."

Shanklin South
Party	Candidate	Votes	%	±%
Independent	Richard Priest	629		
Conservative	David Pugh	619		
Turnout			42.31	

== See also ==
- Politics of the Isle of Wight
